= Beer chemistry =

Brewery science and beer chemical composition

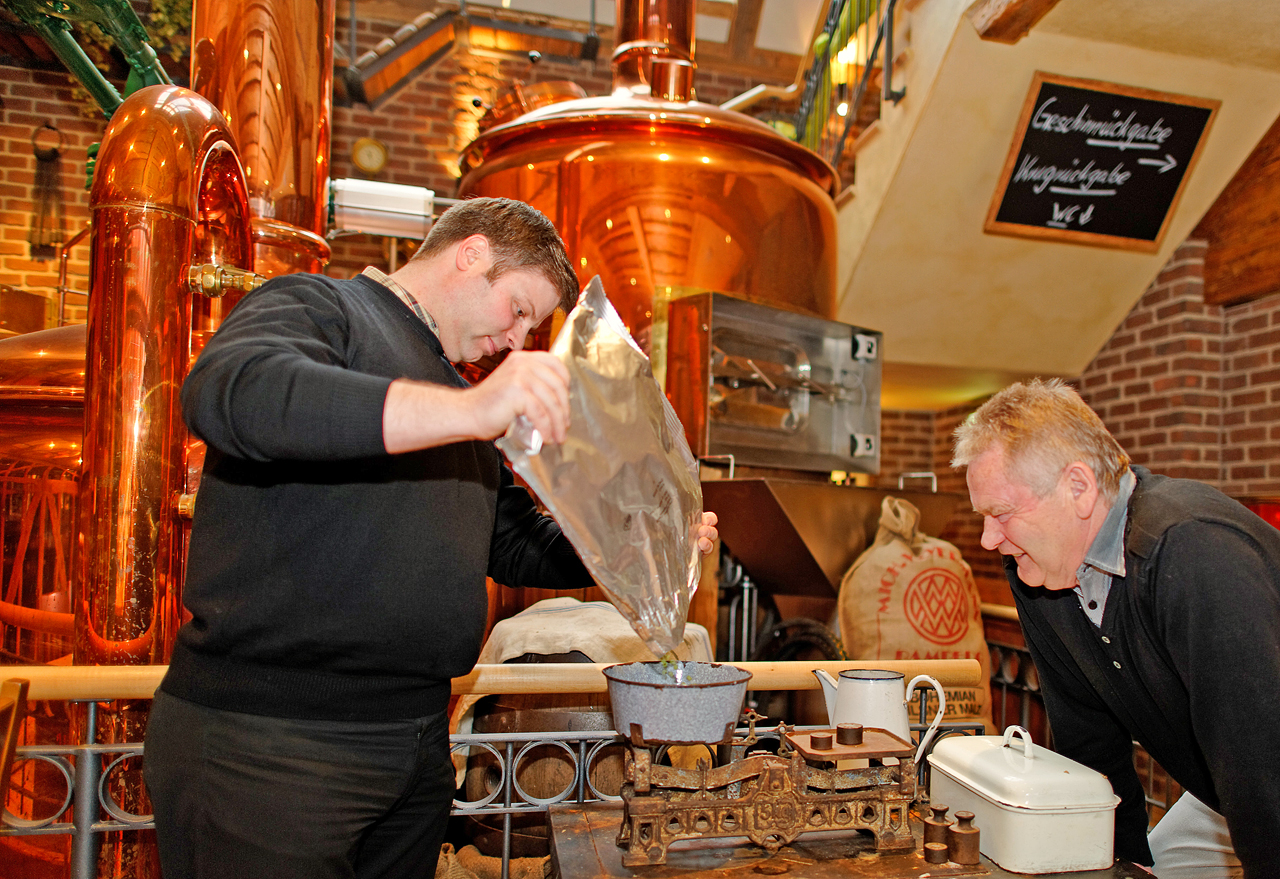
Weighing hops

The chemical compounds in beer give it a distinctive taste, smell and appearance. The majority of compounds in beer come from the metabolic activities of plants and yeast and so are covered by the fields of biochemistry and organic chemistry. The main exception is that beer contains over 90% water and the mineral ions in the water (hardness) can have a significant effect upon the taste.

== Four main ingredients ==
Four main ingredients are used for making beer in the process of brewing: carbohydrates (from malt), hops, yeast, and water.

=== Carbohydrates (from malt) ===
The carbohydrate source is an essential part of the beer because unicellular yeast organisms convert carbohydrates into energy to live. Yeast metabolize the carbohydrate source to form a number of compounds including ethanol. The process of brewing beer starts with malting and mashing, which breaks down the long carbohydrates in the barley grain into more simple sugars. This is important because yeast can only metabolize very short chains of sugars. Long-carbohydrates are polymers, large branching linkages of the same molecule over and over. In the case of barley, we mostly see polymers called amylopectin and amylose which are made of repeating linkages of glucose. On very large time-scales (thermodynamically) these polymers would break down on their own, and there would be no need for the malting process. The process is normally sped up by heating up the barley grain. This heating process activates enzymes called amylases. The shape of these enzymes, their active site, gives them the unique and powerful ability to speed these degradation reactions to over 100,000 times faster. The reaction that takes place at the active site is called a hydrolysis reaction, which is a cleavage of the linkages between the sugars. Repeated hydrolysis breaks the long amylopectin polymers into simpler sugars that can be digested by the yeast.

Amylopectin consists of many glucose molecules linked together either by 1,6 or 1,4 linkages.

=== Hops ===
Hops are the flowers of the hops plant Humulus lupulus. These flowers contain over 440 essential oils, which contribute to the aroma and non-bitter flavors of beer. However, the distinct bitterness especially characteristic of pale ales comes from a family of compounds called alpha-acids (also called humulones) and beta-acids (also called lupulones). Generally, brewers believe that α-acids give the beer a pleasant bitterness whereas β-acids are considered less pleasant. α-acids isomerize during the boiling process in the reaction pictured. The six-member ring in the humulone isomerizes to a five-member ring, but it is not commonly discussed how this affects perceived bitterness.

Humulone is an alpha-acid and one of the major flavor components of hops. Chemistry of beer often concerns the reactions of molecules such as this, and how to better control them for best flavor.

=== Yeast ===
Chemical structures showing ethanol fermentation

In beer, the metabolic waste products of yeast are a significant factor. In aerobic conditions, the yeast will use in the glycolysis the simple sugars obtained from the malting process, and convert pyruvate, the major organic product of glycolysis, into carbon dioxide and water via the cellular respiration. Many homebrewers use this aspect of yeast metabolism to carbonate their beers. However, under industrial anaerobic conditions yeasts cannot use pyruvate, the end products of glycolysis, to generate energy in cellular respiration. Instead, they rely on a process called fermentation. Fermentation converts pyruvate into ethanol through the intermediate acetaldehyde.

=== Water ===
Water can often play, directly or indirectly, a very important role in the way a beer tastes, as it is the main ingredient. The ion species present in water can affect the metabolic pathways of yeast, and thus the metabolites one can taste. For example, calcium and iron ions are essential in small amounts for yeast to survive, because these metal ions are usually required cofactors for yeast enzymes.

== Beer carbonation ==
In aerobic conditions, yeast turns sugars into pyruvate then converts pyruvate into water and carbon dioxide. This process can carbonate beers. In commercial production, the yeast works in anaerobic conditions to convert pyruvate into ethanol, and does not carbonate beer. Beer is carbonated with pressurized CO_{2}. When beer is poured, carbon dioxide dissolved in the beer escapes and forms tiny bubbles. These bubbles grow and accelerate as they rise by feeding off of nearby smaller bubbles, a phenomenon known as Ostwald ripening. These larger bubbles lead to “coarser” foam on top of poured beer.

=== Nitro beer (CO_{2} replaced by N_{2} gas) ===
Beers can be carbonated with CO_{2} or made sparkling with an inert gas such as nitrogen (N_{2}), argon (Ar), or helium (He). Inert gases are not as soluble in water as carbon dioxide, so they form bubbles that do not grow through Ostwald ripening. This means that the beer has smaller bubbles and a more creamy and stable head. These less soluble inert gases give the beer a different and flatter texture. In beer terms, the mouthfeel is smooth, not bubbly like beers with normal carbonation. Nitro beer (for nitrogen beer) could taste less acidic than normal beer.

== Aromatic compounds ==
Beers contain many aromatic substances. Up to now, chemists using advanced analytical instruments such as gas and high performance liquid chromatographs coupled to mass spectrometers, have discovered over 7,700 different chemical compounds in beers.

== Foam stabilizers ==
The beer foam stability depends amongst other on the presence of transition metal ions (Fe^{2+}, Co^{2+}, Ni^{2+}, Cu^{2+}...), macromolecules such as polysaccharides, proteins, and isohumulone compounds from hops in the beer. Foam stability is an important concern for the first perception of the beer by the consumer and is therefore the object of the greatest care by the brewers and the barmen in charge to serve draft beer, or to properly pour beer into a glass from the bottle (with a good head retention and without overfoaming, or gushing when opening the bottle).

Many patents for various types of beer foam stabilizers have been filed by breweries and the agro-chemical industry in the last decades. Cobalt salts added at low concentration (1 – 2 ppm) were popular in the sixties, but raised the question of cobalt toxicity in case of undetected accidental overdosage during beer production. As an alternative, organic foam stabilizers are produced by hydrolysis of recovered by-products of beer manufacture, such as spent grains or hops residues.

Amongst the large spectrum of purified, or modified, natural food additives available on the market, soluble carboxymethyl hydroxyethyl cellulose, propylene glycol alginate (PGA, food additive with E number E405), pectins and gellan gum have also been investigated as foam stabilizer.

=== Cobalt salts ===
In 1957, two brewing chemists, Thorne and Helm, discovered that the Co^{2+} cation was able to stabilize beer foam and to prevent beer overfoaming and gushing. The addition of a tiny amount of cobalt ions in the range 1 – 2 mg/L (ppm) was effective. Higher concentrations would be toxic and lower ones ineffective.

Cobalt is a transition metal whose atomic orbitals are able to interact with ligands, or functional groups (–OH, –COOH, –NH_{2}), attached to organic molecules naturally present in the beer, making macromolecular coordination complexes stabilizing the beer foam. Cobalt could behave as an inter- or intra-molecular bridge between different polysaccharide molecules (changing their shape or size), or cause some conformational changes of different types of molecules present in solution, affecting their absolute configuration and thus the foam molecular structure and its behavior.

Thorne and Helm (1957) also formulated the hypothesis that cobalt, by being complexed with certain nitrogenous constituents of the beer (e.g., amino acids from malt proteins), might produce surface-active substances inactivating the gaseous nuclei responsible for overfoaming and gushing.

Gushing is a specific problem also studied into more details by Rudin and Hudson (1958). These authors discovered that gushing is also promoted by other transition metal ions such as these of nickel and iron, but not by cobalt ions. Isohumulone (an iso-alpha acid responsible for the bitter taste of hops) and its combinations with Ni, or Fe, also favor gushing, while pure Co ions or their combination with isohumulone do not exhibit gushing and overfoaming. This explains why cobalt salts were specifically selected at a concentration of 1 – 2 mg/L as anti-gushing agent for beer. Rudin and Hudson (1958) and other authors also found that Co, Ni and Fe ions preferentially concentrate in the foam itself.

In the sixties, after approval by the US FDA, cobalt sulfate was commonly used at low concentration in the USA as an additive to stabilize beer foam and to prevent gushing after beer is exposed to vibrations during its transport or handling.

Although cobalt is an essential micronutrient needed for vitamin B12 synthesis, excess levels of cobalt in the body can lead to cobalt poisoning and must be avoided. It triggered the development of qualitative and quantitative analysis methods to accurately assay cobalt in beer in order to prevent accidental overdosage and cobalt poisoning.

Too high levels of cobalt are known to be responsible for the beer drinker's cardiomyopathy. The first issues mentioned in the literature were reported in Canada in the middle of the sixties after an accidental overdosage in the Dow Breweries in Quebec City.

In August 1965, a person presented to a hospital in Quebec City with symptoms suggestive of alcoholic cardiomyopathy. Over the next eight months, fifty more cases with similar findings appeared in the same area with twenty of these being fatal. It was noted that all were heavy drinkers who mostly drank beer and preferred the Dow brand; thirty out of those drank more than 6 litres (12 pints) of beer per day. Epidemiological studies found that the Dow Breweries had been adding cobalt sulfate to the beer for foam stability since July 1965 and that the concentration added in the Quebec city brewery was ten times that of the same beer brewed in Montreal where there were no reported cases.

== Storage and degradation ==
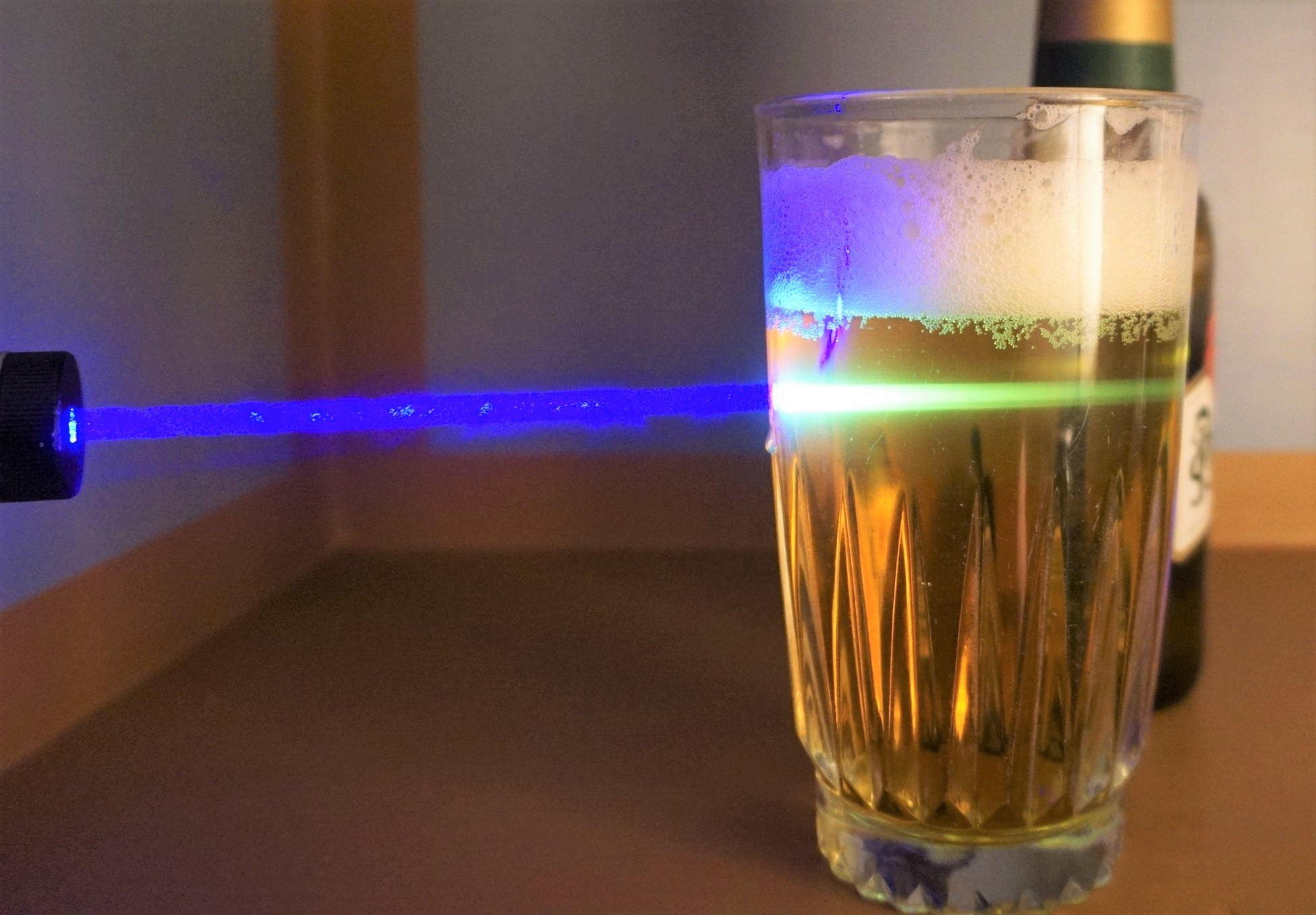
Organic aromatic acids found naturally in beer, such as tryptophan, tyrosine, and phenylalanine, absorb blue light and fluoresce in green under 450 nm laser light.

A particular problem with beer is that, unlike wine, its quality tends to deteriorate as it ages. A cat urine smell and flavor called ribes, named for the genus of the black currant, tends to develop and peak. A cardboard smell then dominates which is due to the release of 2-nonenal. In general, chemists believe that the "off-flavors" that come from old beers are due to reactive oxygen species. These may come in the form of oxygen free radicals, for example, which can change the chemical structures of compounds in beer that give them their taste. Oxygen radicals can cause increased concentrations of aldehydes from the Strecker degradation reactions of amino acids in beer.

Beer is unique when compared to other alcoholic beverages because it is unstable in the final package. There are many variables and chemical compounds that affect the flavor of beer during the production steps, but also during the storage of beer. Beer will develop an off-flavor during storage because of many factors, including sunlight and the amount of oxygen in the headspace of the bottle. Other than changes in taste, beer can also develop visual changes. Beer can become hazy during storage. This is called colloidal stability (haze formation) and is typically caused by the raw materials used during the brewing process. The primary reaction that causes beer haze is the polymerization of polyphenols and binding with specific proteins. This type of haze can be seen when beer is cooled below 0 degrees Celsius. When the beer is raised to room temperature, the haze dissolves. But if a beer is stored at room temperature for too long (about 6 months) a permanent haze will form. A study done by Heuberger et al. (2012) concludes that storage temperature of beers affects the flavor stability. They found that the metabolite profile of room temperature and cold temperature stored beer differed significantly from fresh beer. They also have evidence to support significant beer oxidation after weeks of storage, which also has an effect on the flavor of beer.

The off-flavour in beer, such as a cardboard or green apple taste, is often associated with the appearance of staling aldehydes. The Strecker aldehydes responsible for the flavor change are formed during storage of the beers. Philip Wietstock et al. performed experiments to test what causes the formation of Strecker aldehydes during storage. They found that only amino acid concentration (leucine (Leu), isoleucine (Ile), and phenylalanine (Phe), specifically) and dissolved oxygen concentration caused Strecker aldehyde formation. They also tested carbohydrate and Fe^{2+} additions. A linear relationship was found between Strecker aldehydes formed and total packaged oxygen. This is important for brewers to know so that they can control the taste of their beer. Wietstock concludes that capping beers with oxygen barrier crown corks will diminish Strecker aldehyde formation.

In another study done by Vanderhaegen et al. (2003), different aging conditions were tested on a bottled beer after 6 months. They found a decrease in volatile esters was responsible for a reduced fruity flavor. They also found an increase in many other compounds including carbonyl compounds, ethyl esters, Maillard compounds, dioxolanes, and furanic ethers. The carbonyl compounds, as stated previously in the Wietstock experiments, will create Strecker aldehydes, which tend to cause a green apple flavor. Esters are known to cause fruity flavors such as pears, roses, and bananas. Maillard compounds will cause a toasty, malty flavor.

A study done by Charles Bamforth and Roy Parsons (1985) also confirms that beer staling flavors are caused by various carbonyl compounds. They used thiobarbituric acid (TBA) to estimate the staling substances after using an accelerated aging technique. They found that beer staling is reduced by scavengers of the hydroxyl radical (^{•}OH), such as mannitol and ascorbic acid. They also tested the hypothesis that soybean extracts included in the fermenting wort enhance the shelf life of beer flavor.

== See also ==
- Barm
- Beer head
- Beer faults
- Brewing
- Bright beer
- Carbonation
- Lightstruck beer
- Mouthfeel
- Isohumulone
- Yeast in Beermaking
