= Beer measurement =

Methods of measurement of beer

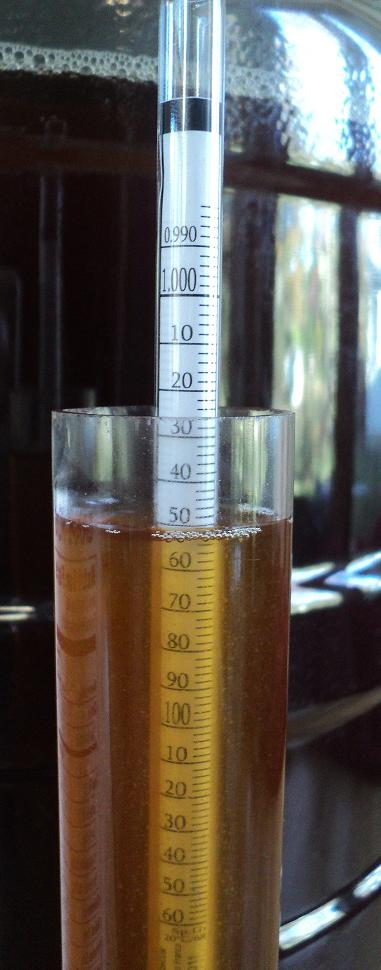
A hydrometer floating in a test jar of wort, where the specific gravity reading is approximately 1.050.

The principal factors that characterize beer are bitterness, the variety of flavours present and their intensity, alcohol content, and colour. Standards for those characteristics allow a more objective and uniform determination to be made on the overall qualities of any beer.

== Colour ==
The "degrees Lovibond" or "°L" scale is a measure of the colour of a substance, usually beer, whiskey, or sugar solutions. The determination of the degrees Lovibond takes place by comparing the colour of the substance to a series of amber to brown glass slides, usually by a colorimeter. The scale was devised by Joseph Williams Lovibond. The Standard Reference Method (SRM) and European Brewery Convention (EBC) methods have largely replaced it, with the SRM giving results approximately equal to the °L.

The Standard Reference Method or SRM is a system modern brewers use to measure colour intensity, roughly darkness, of a beer or wort. The method involves the use of a spectrophotometer or photometer to measure the attenuation of light of a particular wavelength, 430 nanometrenm (blue), as it passes through a sample contained in a cuvette of standardised dimensions located in the light path of the instrument.

The EBC also measures beer and wort colour, as well as quantifying turbidity (also known as haze) in beer.

Color based on Standard Reference Method (SRM)
SRM/Lovibond	Example	Beer color	EBC
2	Pale lager, Witbier, Pilsener, Berliner Weisse		4
3	Maibock, Blonde Ale		6
4	Weissbier		8
6	American Pale Ale, India Pale Ale		12
8	Weissbier, Saison		16
10	English Bitter, ESB		20
13	Bière de Garde, Double IPA		26
17	Dark lager, Vienna lager, Märzen, Amber Ale		33
20	Brown Ale, Bock, Dunkel, Dunkelweizen		39
24	Irish Dry Stout, Doppelbock, Porter		47
29	Stout		57
35	Foreign Stout, Baltic Porter		69
40+	Imperial Stout		79

== Strength ==
The strength of beer is measured by its alcohol content by volume expressed as a percentage, that is to say, the number of millilitres of absolute alcohol (ethanol) in 100 mL of beer.

The most accurate method of determining the strength of a beer would be to take a quantity of beer and distill off a spirit that contains all of the alcohol that was in the beer. The alcohol content of the spirit can then be measured using a hydrometer and tables of density of alcohol and water mixtures. A second accurate method is the ebulliometer method, which uses the difference between the boiling temperature of pure water and the boiling temperature of the beer being tested.

In practice the most common method used to estimate the strength of a beer is to measure the amount of sugars or "extract" in the wort before fermentation and then again once the fermentation is completed, and to use these two data points in an empirical formula which estimates the alcohol content or strength of the beer.

=== Density ===
The most common method of (indirectly) measuring the amount of extract in the wort or beer is by measuring the density of the liquid, often performed using a hydrometer, and converting the density measurement to extract, the mass fraction of sugars in the wort or beer. Hydrometers can be calibrated with a number of scales. A common scale is that of specific gravity (SG), that is to say the density of a liquid relative to the density of pure water (at a standard temperature). Specific gravity can also be measured by a pycnometer or oscillating U-tube electronic meter. Water has a SG of 1.000, absolute alcohol has a SG of 0.789. Other density scales are discussed below.

The density of the wort depends on the sugar content in the wort: the more sugar the higher the density. The fermented beer will have some residual sugar which will raise the SG, the alcohol content will lower the SG. The difference between the SG of the wort before fermentation and the SG of the beer after fermentation gives an indication of how much sugar was converted to alcohol and CO_{2} by the yeast. A basic formula to calculate beer strength based on the difference between the original and final SG is:

$$ABV = 131.25(OG - FG)$$

The formula below is an alternate equation which provides more accurate estimates at higher alcohol percentages (it is typically used for beers above 6 or 7%).

$$ABV = 133(OG - FG)/FG$$

where OG is the original gravity, or the specific gravity before fermentation and FG is the final gravity or SG after fermentation.

"Original Extract" (OE) is a synonym for original gravity. The OE is often referred to as the "size" of the beer and is, in Germany, often printed on the label as Stammwürze or sometimes just as a percent. In the Czech Republic, for example, people speak of "10 degree beers", "12 degree beers" and so on.

Gravity measurements are used to determine the size of the beer, its alcoholic strength, and how much of the available sugar the yeast was able to consume (a given strain can be expected, under proper conditions, to ferment a wort of a particular composition to within a range of attenuation; that is, it should be able to consume a known percentage of the extract).

Historically gravity was measured and recorded in brewer's pounds (also known as just "pounds"). If a wort was said to be "26 lbs. gravity per barrel" it meant that a standard barrel of 36 imperial gallons (164 L) of the wort weighed 26 pounds (11.8 kg) more than a barrel of pure water. The actual measurement was by saccharometer (i.e. hydrometer) correcting for temperature by a calibration scale or else by a special brewer's slide rule. An average strength first running of 1864 would be 30 pounds (13.6 kg) or 1.083 OG. (Note: 1 imperial gallon of water weighs 10 lb (4.5 kg); a 36-imperial-gallon (160 L) barrel holds 360 lb (160 kg) of water. 30-pound (13.6 kg) beer is 30/360 or 1.083 OG (13.6/164 kg/litre, or 83 g/litre))

=== Extract ===
Two common scales used for measuring the amount of sugars in wort and must are:

- Brix (°Bx)
- Plato (°P)

The oldest scale, Balling (°Balling), was developed in 1843 by Bohemian scientist Karl Joseph Napoleon Balling (1805–1868) and Simon Ack. In the 1850s, German engineer-mathematician Adolf Ferdinand Wenceslaus Brix (1798–1870) corrected some of the calculation errors in the Balling scale and introduced the Brix scale. In the early 1900s German chemist Fritz Plato (1858–1938) and his collaborators made further improvements, introducing the Plato scale. Essentially the Balling, Brix, and Plato scales are all the same scale, with improvements in accuracy and reliability in the newer versions, since they are all based on mass fraction of sucrose; the tables for the three scales differ mainly in their precision and in the temperature at which the measurements are to be made.

A rough conversion between specific gravity, SG, and either degrees Brix, Plato or Balling can be made by dividing the thousandths of SG above 1 (which is often referred to as gravity points) by 4. So a specific gravity of 1.048 has 48 gravity points, and 48 divided by 4 would be approximately 12 degrees Plato, Balling or Brix. This conversion is an approximation of the relationship between specific gravity and mass fraction in °P by the linear equation:

$$^\circ P = 250\cdot SG - 250.$$

However, the above approximation gives an increasingly larger error for increasing values of specific gravity, deviating e.g. by 0.67°P when SG = 1.080. A much more accurate conversion (with a mean average error less than 0.02°P) can be made using the following formula:

$$^\circ P = 260.4 - \frac{260.4}{SG}$$

where the specific gravity is to be measured at a temperature of T = 20 °C. The equivalent relation giving SG at 20 °C for a given °P is:

$$SG = \frac{260.4}{260.4-^\circ P}$$

Winemakers, as well as the sugar and juice industry, typically use degrees Brix. British and continental European beer brewers generally use degrees Plato. American brewers use a mixture of degrees Balling, degrees Plato and specific gravity. Home wine, mead, cider, and beer makers typically use specific gravity.

In some countries, alcohol by volume is referred to as degrees Gay-Lussac (after the French chemist Joseph Louis Gay-Lussac). France, Spain and the United Kingdom use the system to determine alcohol content. Belgium, Norway, and Sweden use a modified table to calculate taxes on alcoholic beverages.

=== Saltire marks ===
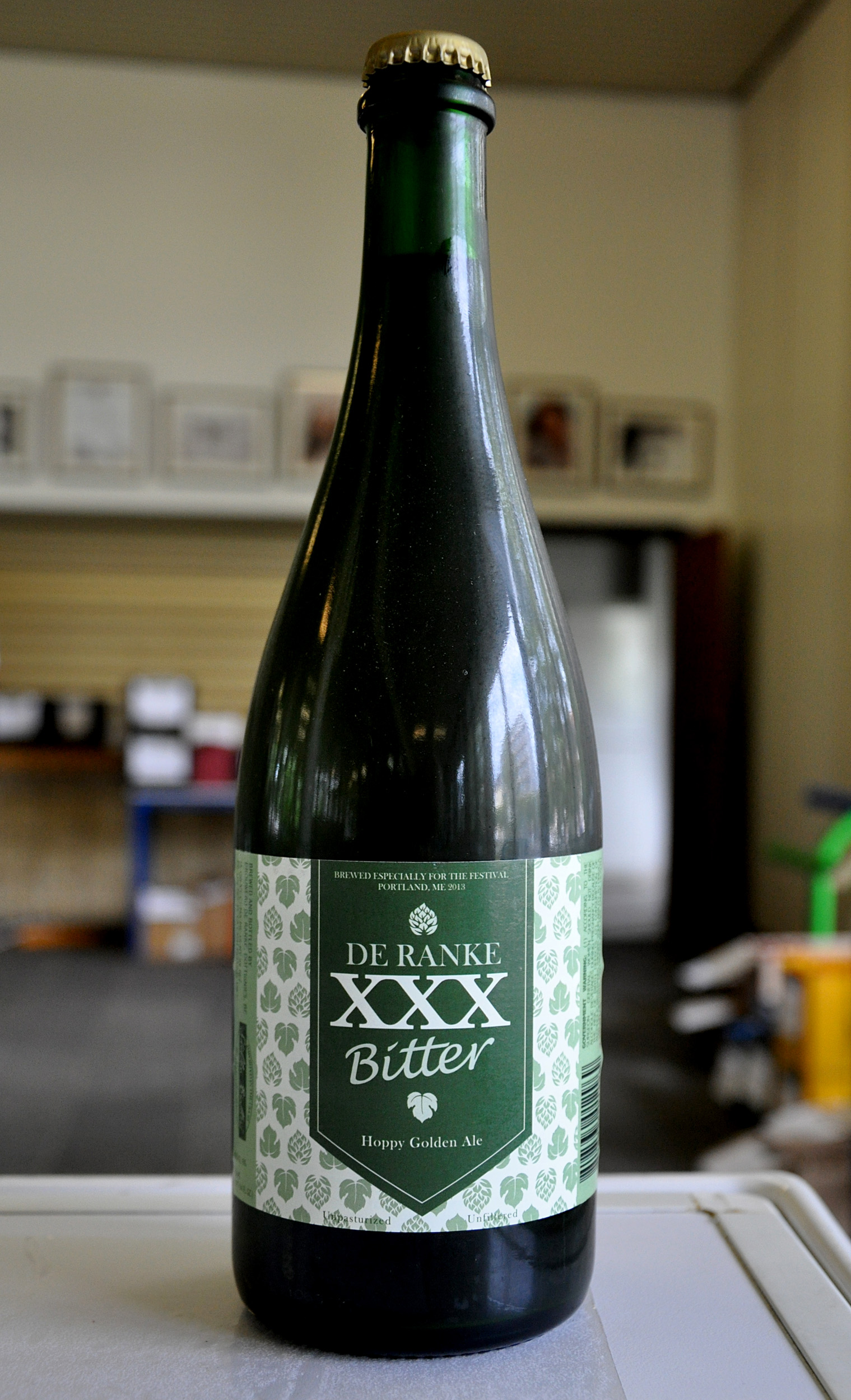
A bottle of XXX bitter ale from Belgium (originally made for the US market)

The Saint Andrew's Cross is used on some beers, and was traditionally a mark of beer strength, with more exes indicating a higher alcoholic content. Some sources suggest that the origin of the mark was in the breweries of medieval monasteries, where the cross served as a guarantee of quality for beers of increasing strength.

Another explanation for the saltire marks may be rooted in the duty taxes of alcoholic beverages beginning in England in 1643. The mark on a cask of beer was originally used to indicate that the contents were stronger than legal small beer limits, and were subject to a tax of ten (Roman numeral X) shillings per barrel. Later, brewers added additional (superfluous numeral) X marks to signify progressively stronger beers: "the present quack-like denominations of XX [twenty, but often pronounced "double (letter) X"] and XXX [thirty, often pronounced "treble (letter) X"], which appear, unnecessarily, on the casks and in the accounts of the strong-ale brewers".

In mid-19th-century England, the use of letter "X" and other ones had evolved into a standardized grading system for the strength of beer. Today, it is used as a trademark by a number of brewers in the United Kingdom, the Commonwealth and the United States.

== Bitterness ==
Bitterness scales attempt to rate the relative bitterness of beer. The bitterness of beer is provided by compounds such as humulones, or alpha acids from hops used during brewing. During the brewing process, humulone undergoes isomerization to form both cis- and trans- isohumulone which are responsible for the bitter taste of the beer. Hops also contain lupulones, or beta acids; these beta acids are not considered in the initial bittering of the wort as much as their alpha acid counterparts since they do not isomerize through boiling, and therefore do not dissolve in the wort. However, beta acids can undergo oxidation and slowly contribute to the bitterness of the beer. This bitterness is harsher than the bitterness of the alpha acids, and can be undesirable. The oxidation occurs over time through fermentation, storage, and aging. At the same time, isomerized alpha acids undergo degradation which reduces the bitterness.

IBUs of some common styles
Beer style	IBUs
Lambic	0–10
Wheat beer	8–18
American lager	8–26
Irish red ale	15–30
Kölsch	20–30
Pilsner	24–44
Porter	18–50
Bitter	24–50
Pale ale	30–50
Stout	30–90
Barleywine	34–120
India pale ale	40–120

Since the quantities of alpha and beta acids range among hops, the variety of hop should be considered when targeting a specific amount of bitterness in the beer. To maximize bitterness, hops with large alpha acid concentrations should be used. Such varieties include Chinook, Galena, Horizon, Tomahawk, and Warrior hops, and these contain alpha acid concentrations up to 16% by mass. Since the bitterness is not influenced by beta acids, beta acids are not considered when selecting the variety of hop. Also, the amount of time that the hops are boiled affects the bitterness of the beer. Since heat is needed to isomerize alpha acids, applying heat for longer amounts of time increases the conversion to the isomerized form.

The International Bitterness Units scale, or IBU, is used to approximately quantify the bitterness of beer. This scale is not measured on the perceived bitterness of the beer, but rather the amount of iso-alpha acids. There are several methods to measure IBU. The most common and widely used way is through spectrophotometry. In this process, hops are boiled in wort to promote isomerization. Since the iso-alpha acids are slightly hydrophobic, a reduction of the pH by adding acid increases the hydrophobicity of the iso-alpha acids. At this point, an organic solution is added and the iso-alpha acids shift to the organic layer out of the aqueous wort. This new solution is then placed in a spectrophotometer and the absorbance is read at 275 nm. At this wavelength, the iso-alpha acids have their highest absorbance which allows for the calculation of the concentration of these bittering molecules. This technique was adopted at the same time as another method based on measuring the concentration (in milligrams per litre; parts per million w/v) of isomerized α acids (IAA) in a beer, causing some confusion among small-scale brewers. The American Society of Brewing Chemists, in the introduction to its methods on measuring bitterness, points out some differences between the results of the two methods:

While the results of the IAA methods are practically identical to those obtained by the [I]BU method for beer brewed with fresh hops, the IAAs of beer brewed with old or poorly stored hops, and with certain special hop extracts, can be significantly lower than the [I]BU figure.

Additionally, HPLC, mass spectrometry, and fluorescence spectroscopy can be employed to measure the amount of iso-alpha acids in a beer.

The European Bitterness Units scale, often abbreviated as EBU, is a bitterness scale in which lower values are generally "less bitter" and higher values "more bitter". The scale and method are defined by the European Brewery Convention, and the numerical value should be the same as of the International Bittering Units scale (IBU), defined in co-operation with the American Society of Brewing Chemists. However, the exact process of determining EBU and IBU values differs slightly, which may in theory result with slightly smaller values for EBU than IBU.

IBU is not determined by the perceived bitterness of the taste of the beer. For example, the bittering effect of hops is less noticeable in beers with roasted malts or strong flavours, so a higher proportion of hops would be required in strong flavoured beers to achieve the same perceived bitterness as in moderately flavoured beers. For example, an imperial stout may have an IBU of 50, but will taste less bitter than a pale lager with an IBU of 30, because the pale lager has a lower flavour intensity. After around 100 IBU, hop utilization is so poor that the number ceases to be meaningful in regard to taste, although continued hop additions will increase bitterness. Light lagers without much bitterness will generally have 8–20 IBU, while an India pale ale may have 60–100 IBU or more.

== Automated combined systems ==
For high throughput applications (as in quality control labs of large breweries for example), automated systems are available.

Simple systems work with adjustment data blocks for each kind of beer, while high-end systems are matrix-independent and give accurate results for alcohol strength, extract content, pH, colour, turbidity, CO_{2} and O_{2} without any product-specific calibration.

Latest innovations are packaged beverage analyzers, that measure directly out of the package (glass bottle, PET bottle or can) and give several parameters in one measuring cycle without any sample preparation (no degassing, no filtering, no temperature conditioning).

=== Oxidative degradation measurement ===
Oxidative deterioration of beer can be measured by way of chemiluminescence or by electron spin resonance. Automated systems exist to determine the lag time of beer related to the antioxidant capacity to resist oxidative spoilage of flavours.

== Software ==
Software tools are available to brewers to formulate and adapt recipes with a view to accurately measure the various values in brewing. Data can be exchanged in formats such as BeerXML to allow for accurate replication of recipes at remote sites or the adaptation of recipes to account for variations in locally available water, mash ingredients, hops etc.

== See also ==
- Beer style, information on the styles of beer
