= C21H30O5 =

The molecular formula C_{21}H_{30}O_{5} (molar mass: 362.46 g/mol, exact mass: 362.209324) may refer to:

- Cortisol, a corticosteroid
- 5α-Dihydroaldosterone
- Dihydrocortisone
- Hydrocortisone
- Humulone
- 18-Hydroxycorticosterone
- Isohumulone
