= Sugar May (peach) =

Peach cultivar

Prunus persica "Sugar May"
- Species: Prunus persica
- Breeder: Zaiger Genetics
- Origin: Modesto, California

The "Sugar May" is an early-season, freestone white-fleshed peach cultivar developed by Zaiger Genetics in Modesto, California, and patented on November 17, 1992.

== Characteristics ==
The Sugar May was sized at about 6.99 cm (2.75 inches) with brix level at about 10-12. However, it was susceptible to brown rots according to studies from Clemson University. Its skin has a deep red color and ripens 10 days before the "Redhaven" variety.

== Literature ==
- Quantitative and Qualitative Changes in Sugar Content of Peach Genotypes [ Prunus persica (L.) Batsch. ] - Sylvia J. Brooks, James N. Moore, and J. Brad Murphy, 1993
