= Brix =

Sugar content of an aqueous solution

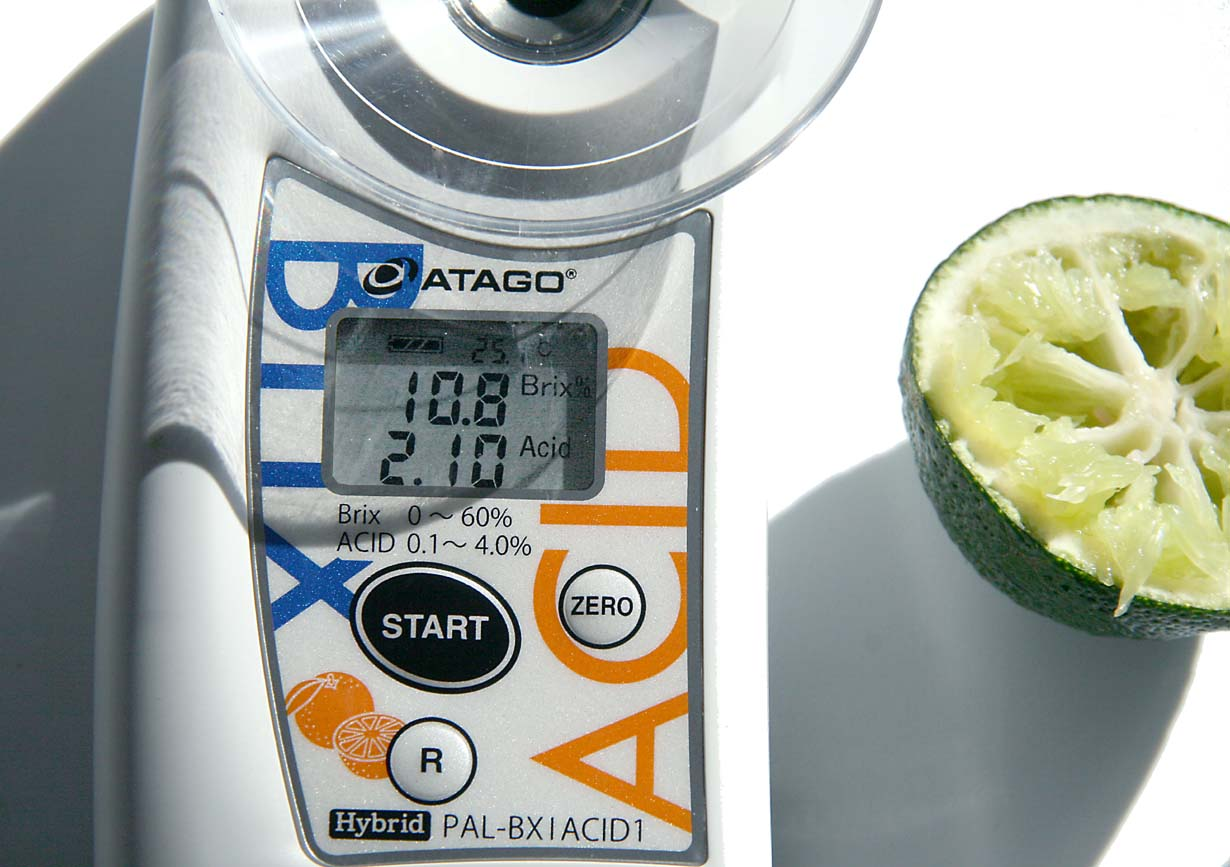
Measuring brix and percent acidity of a sudachi

Degrees Brix (symbol °Bx) is a measure of the dissolved solids in a liquid, based on its specific gravity, and is commonly used to measure dissolved sugar content of a solution. One degree Brix is the concentration of one unit mass of solute in 100 units mass of solution, thereby representing the strength of the solution as percentage by mass (e.g. the concentration of solute in a solution of 99 g water and 1 g sugar, i.e. 100 g aqueous solution of 1% sugar, is 1 °Bx). If the solution contains dissolved solids other than pure sucrose, then °Bx only approximates the dissolved solid content. For example, when one creates two solutions, one with equal volumes of salt and water and one with equal volumes of sugar and water, the number of degrees Brix of the salt solution is higher than that of the sugar solution because the salt is denser. The unit °Bx is traditionally used in the wine, sugar, carbonated beverage, fruit juice, fresh produce, maple syrup, and honey industries. The degree Brix is also used for expressing concentrations of water-based cutting fluids for metalworking processes. Concentration of dissolved solids can also be measured by using a refractometer, but different solutes affect refractivity differently, and the refractivity is not directly correlated with the specific gravity of the substance, so to infer concentration of any particular substance the correlation between refractivity and concentration for the specific substance must be known.

Comparable scales for indicating sucrose content are: the Plato scale (°P), which is widely used by the brewing industry; the Oechsle scale, used in German and Swiss wine making industries, amongst others; and the Balling scale, which is the oldest of the three systems, mostly found in older textbooks, but still used in some parts of the world.

A sucrose solution with an apparent specific gravity (20°/20 °C) of 1.040 would be 9.99325 °Bx, or 9.99359 °P, while the representative sugar body, the International Commission for Uniform Methods of Sugar Analysis (ICUMSA), which favours the use of mass fraction, would report the solution strength as 9.99249%. Because the differences between the systems are of little practical significance (the differences are less than the precision of most common instruments), and due to wide historical use of the Brix, modern instruments calculate mass fraction using ICUMSA official formulas but report the result in °Bx.

== Background ==
In the early 1800s, Karl Balling, followed by Adolf Brix, and finally in the early 1900s the Normal-Commissions under Fritz Plato, prepared pure sucrose solutions of known strength, measured their specific gravities and prepared tables of percent sucrose by mass vs. measured specific gravity. Balling measured specific gravity to 3 decimal places, Brix to 5, and the Normal-Eichungs Kommission to 6 with the goal of the Commission being to correct errors in the 5th and 6th decimal place in the Brix table.

Equipped with one of these tables, a brewer wishing to know how much sugar was in his wort could measure its specific gravity and enter that specific gravity into the Plato table to obtain °Plato, which is the concentration of sucrose by percentage mass. Similarly, a vintner could enter the specific gravity of his must into the Brix table to obtain the °Bx, which is the concentration of sucrose by percent mass. It is important to point out that neither wort nor must is a solution of pure sucrose in pure water. Many other compounds are dissolved as well but these are either sugars, which behave similar to sucrose with respect to specific gravity as a function of concentration, or compounds that are present in small amounts (minerals, hop acids in wort, tannins, acids in must). In any case, even if °Bx is not representative of the exact amount of sugar in a must or fruit juice, it can be used for comparison of relative sugar content.

== Measurement ==
=== Specific gravity ===
As specific gravity was the basis for the Balling, Brix and Plato tables, dissolved sugar content was originally estimated by measurement of specific gravity using a hydrometer or pycnometer. In modern times, hydrometers are still widely used, but where greater accuracy is required, an electronic oscillating U-tube meter may be employed. Whichever means is used, the analyst enters the tables with specific gravity and takes out (using interpolation if necessary) the sugar content in percent by mass.

If the analyst uses the Plato tables (maintained by the American Society of Brewing Chemists) they report in °P. If using the Brix table (the current version of which is maintained by NIST and can be found on their website), they report in °Bx. If using the ICUMSA tables, they would report in mass fraction (m.f.).

It is not, typically, actually necessary to consult tables as the tabulated °Bx or °P value can be printed directly on the hydrometer scale next to the tabulated value of specific gravity or stored in the memory of the electronic U-tube meter or calculated from polynomial fits to the tabulated data, in fact, the ICUMSA tables are calculated from a best-fit polynomial.

Also note that the tables in use today are not those published by Brix or Plato. Those workers measured true specific gravity reference to water at 4 °C using, respectively, 17.5 °C and 20 °C, as the temperature at which the density of a sucrose solution was measured. Both NBS and ASBC converted to apparent specific gravity at 20 °C/20 °C. The ICUMSA tables are based on more recent measurements on sucrose, fructose, glucose and invert sugar, and they tabulate true density and weight in air at 20 °C against mass fraction.

=== Refractive index ===
Dissolution of sucrose and other sugars in water changes not only its specific gravity but its optical properties, in particular its refractive index and the extent to which it rotates the plane of linearly polarized light. The refractive index, n_{D}, for sucrose solutions of various percentage by mass has been measured and tables of n_{D} vs. °Bx published. As with the hydrometer, it is possible to use these tables to calibrate a refractometer so that it reads directly in °Bx. Calibration is usually based on the ICUMSA tables, but the user of an electronic refractometer should verify this.

=== Infrared absorption ===
Sugars also have known infrared absorption spectra and this has made it possible to develop instruments for measuring sugar concentration using mid-infrared (MIR), non-dispersive infrared (NDIR), and Fourier transform infrared (FT-IR) techniques. In-line instruments are available that allow constant monitoring of sugar content in sugar refineries, beverage plants, wineries, etc. As with any other instruments, MIR and FT-IR instruments can be calibrated against pure sucrose solutions and thus report in °Bx, but there are other possibilities with these technologies, as they have the potential to distinguish between sugars and interfering substances. Newer MIR and NDIR instruments have up to five analyzing channels that allow corrections for interference between ingredients.

== Tables ==
=== Specific gravity ===
Formulas derived from the NBS table above:

Approximate (R^{2}=0.999 98) values can be computed from
$$\mathrm{^{\circ}Bx} = 263.663-\frac{263.806}\mathrm{SG},$$
where SG is the apparent specific gravity of the solution at 20 °C/20 °C.

More accurate (R^{2}=0.999 999 994) values are available from the polynomial

$$\mathrm{^{\circ}Bx} = 182.46007\,\mathrm{SG}^3-775.68212\,\mathrm{SG}^2+1262.7794\,\mathrm{SG}-669.56218.$$

RMS disagreement between the polynomial and the NBS table is 0.0009 °Bx.

Another accurate (R^{2}=0.999 999 97) and simpler formula is

$$\mathrm{^{\circ}Bx} = 28.14203\,\mathrm{SG}+202.4427-\frac{230.5870}\mathrm{SG}.$$

The above formulas should not be used outside the range 1.00000 to 1.17874 SG (0 to 40 °Bx).

The Plato scale can be approximated with a mean average error of less than 0.02°P with the following equation:

$$\mathrm{^\circ P} = 260.4 - \frac{260.4}\mathrm{SG}$$

or with even higher accuracy (average error less than 0.00053°P with respect to the ASBC tables) from the best-fit polynomial:

$$\mathrm{^{\circ}P} = 133.5892\,\mathrm{SG}^3 - 622.5576\,\mathrm{SG}^2 + 1102.9079\,\mathrm{SG} - 613.9427.$$

The difference between the °Bx and °P as calculated from the respective polynomials is

$$\mathrm{^{\circ}P}-\mathrm{^{\circ}Bx} = -48.8709\,\mathrm{SG}^3+133.1245\,\mathrm{SG}^2-159.8715\,\mathrm{SG}+55.6195.$$

The difference is generally less than ±0.0005 °Bx or °P with the exception being for weak solutions. As 0 °Bx is approached °P tend toward as much as 0.002 °P higher than the °Bx calculated for the same specific gravity.

Disagreements of this order of magnitude can be expected as the NBS and the ASBC used slightly different values for the density of air and pure water in their calculations for converting to apparent specific gravity. It should be clear from these comments that Plato and Brix are, for all but the most exacting applications, the same.

The ICUMSA polynomials are generally only published in the form where mass fraction is used to derive the density. As a result, they are omitted from this section.

=== Refractive index ===
When a refractometer is used, the Brix value can be obtained from the polynomial fit to the ICUMSA table:

$$\mathrm{^{\circ}Bx} = 11758.74n_D^5 -88885.21n_D^4 + 270177.93n_D^3 - 413145.80n_D^2 + 318417.95n_D -99127.4536,$$

where $n_D$ is the refractive index measured at the wavelength of the sodium D line (589.3 nm) at 20 °C.

Temperature is important as refractive index changes dramatically with temperature. Many refractometers have built in "Automatic Temperature Compensation" (ATC), which is based on knowledge of the way the refractive index of sucrose changes. For example, the refractive index of a sucrose solution of strength less than 10 °Bx is such that a 1 °C change in temperature would cause the Brix reading to shift by about 0.06 °Bx. Beer, conversely, exhibits a change with temperature about three times this much. It is important, therefore, that users of refractometers either make sure the sample and prism of the instrument are both close to 20 °C or, if that is difficult to ensure, readings should be taken at 2 temperatures separated by a few degrees, the change per degree noted and the final recorded value referenced to 20 °C using the Bx vs. Temp slope information.

As solutes other than sucrose may affect the refractive index and the specific gravity differently, this refractive "Brix" value is not interchangeable with the traditional hydrometer Brix unless corrections are applied. The formal term for such a refractive value is "Refractometric Dry Substance" (RDS). See § Brix and actual dissolved solids content below.

== Usage ==
The four scales are often used interchangeably since the differences are minor. They are all specific-gravity-derived scales calibrated against sugar solutions.

- Brix is primarily used in fruit juice, wine making, carbonated beverage industry, starch and the sugar industry.
- Plato is primarily used in brewing.
- Balling appears on older saccharimeters and is still used in the South African wine industry and in some breweries.
- Oechsle as direct reading for the sugar content is primary used in wine making in Germany, Switzerland and Luxembourg.

In modern use the refractometric Brix has displaced most uses of the original Brix based on specific gravity. In the section we distinguish between the refractometric version and the original hydrometric (density-based) version.

=== Refractometric ===
Refractometric Brix is used in the food industry for measuring the approximate amount of sugars in fruits, vegetables, fruit juices, wine, soft drinks and in the starch and sugar manufacturing industry. Different countries use the scales in different industries: In brewing, the UK uses specific gravity X 1000; Europe uses Plato degrees; and the US use a mix of specific gravity, degrees Brix, degrees Baumé, and degrees Plato. For fruit juices, 1.0 degree Brix is denoted as 1.0% sugar by mass. This usually correlates well with perceived sweetness.

Refractometric Brix measurements are also used in the dairy industry to measure the quality of colostrum given to newborn calves, goats, and sheep.

Modern optical Brix meters are divided into two categories. In the first are the Abbe-based instruments in which a drop of the sample solution is placed on a prism; the result is observed through an eyepiece. The critical angle (the angle beyond which light is totally reflected back into the sample) is a function of the refractive index and the operator detects this critical angle by noting where a dark-bright boundary falls on an engraved scale. The scale can be calibrated in Brix or refractive index. Often the prism mount contains a thermometer that can be used to correct to 20 °C in situations where measurement cannot be made at exactly that temperature. These instruments are available in bench and handheld versions.

Digital refractometers also find the critical angle, but the light path is entirely internal to the prism. A drop of sample is placed on its surface, so the critical light beam never penetrates the sample. This makes it easier to read turbid samples. The light/dark boundary, whose position is proportional to the critical angle, is sensed by a CCD array. These meters are also available in bench top (laboratory) and portable (pocket) versions. This ability to easily measure Brix in the field makes it possible to determine ideal harvesting times of fruit and vegetables so that products arrive at the consumers in a perfect state or are ideal for subsequent processing steps such as vinification.

=== Hydrometric ===
Due to higher accuracy and the ability to couple it with other measuring techniques (%CO_{2} and %alcohol), most soft drink companies and breweries use an oscillating U-tube density meter.

== Brix and actual dissolved solids content ==
Whether a sugar solution is measured by refractometer or density meter, the °Bx or °P value obtained by entry into the appropriate table only represents the amount of dry solids dissolved in the sample if the dry solids are exclusively sucrose. This is seldom the case. Grape juice (must), for example, contains little sucrose but does contain glucose, fructose, acids, and other substances. In such cases, the °Bx value clearly cannot be equated with the sucrose content, but it may represent a good approximation to the total sugar content. For example, an 11.0% by mass D-Glucose ("grape sugar") solution measured 10.9 °Bx using a handheld refractometer.

The sugar content of a solution obtained by use of refractometry with the ICUMSA table is formally called refractometric dry substance (RDS), which could be thought of as an equivalent sucrose content. (Analogously, the original Brix can be described as a hydrometric dry substance – though because the term "Brix" already exists, there is no need for the invention of such a term.) Where it is desirable to know the actual dry solids content, empirical correction formulas can be developed based on calibrations with solutions similar to those being tested. For example, in sugar refining, dissolved solids can be accurately estimated from refractive index measurement corrected by an optical rotation (polarization) measurement.

Alcohol has a higher refractive index (1.361) than water (1.333). As a consequence, a refractometer measurement made on a sugar solution, once fermentation has begun, results in a reading substantially higher than the actual solids content. Thus, an operator must be certain that the sample they are testing has not begun to ferment. (If fermentation has indeed started, a correction can be made by estimating alcohol concentration from the original, pre-fermentation reading, termed "OG" by homebrewers.) Traditional Brix or Plato measurements based on specific gravity are also affected by fermentation, but in the opposite direction; as ethanol is less dense than water, an ethanol/sugar/water solution gives a Brix or Plato reading that is artificially low.
