= Amarasate =

Extract for appetite control

Amarasate (from Latin Amarum, "bitter" and Satietas, "satiety") is a bitter extract derived from a New Zealand commercial variety of Humulus lupulus (hops). Amarasate was developed and trademarked by Plant & Food Research, now a group of the Bioeconomy Science Institute, following a NZD $20 million New Zealand Government-funded research initiative aimed at developing gut-targeted, plant-based nutraceuticals for appetite control.

== Appetite suppression mechanism ==
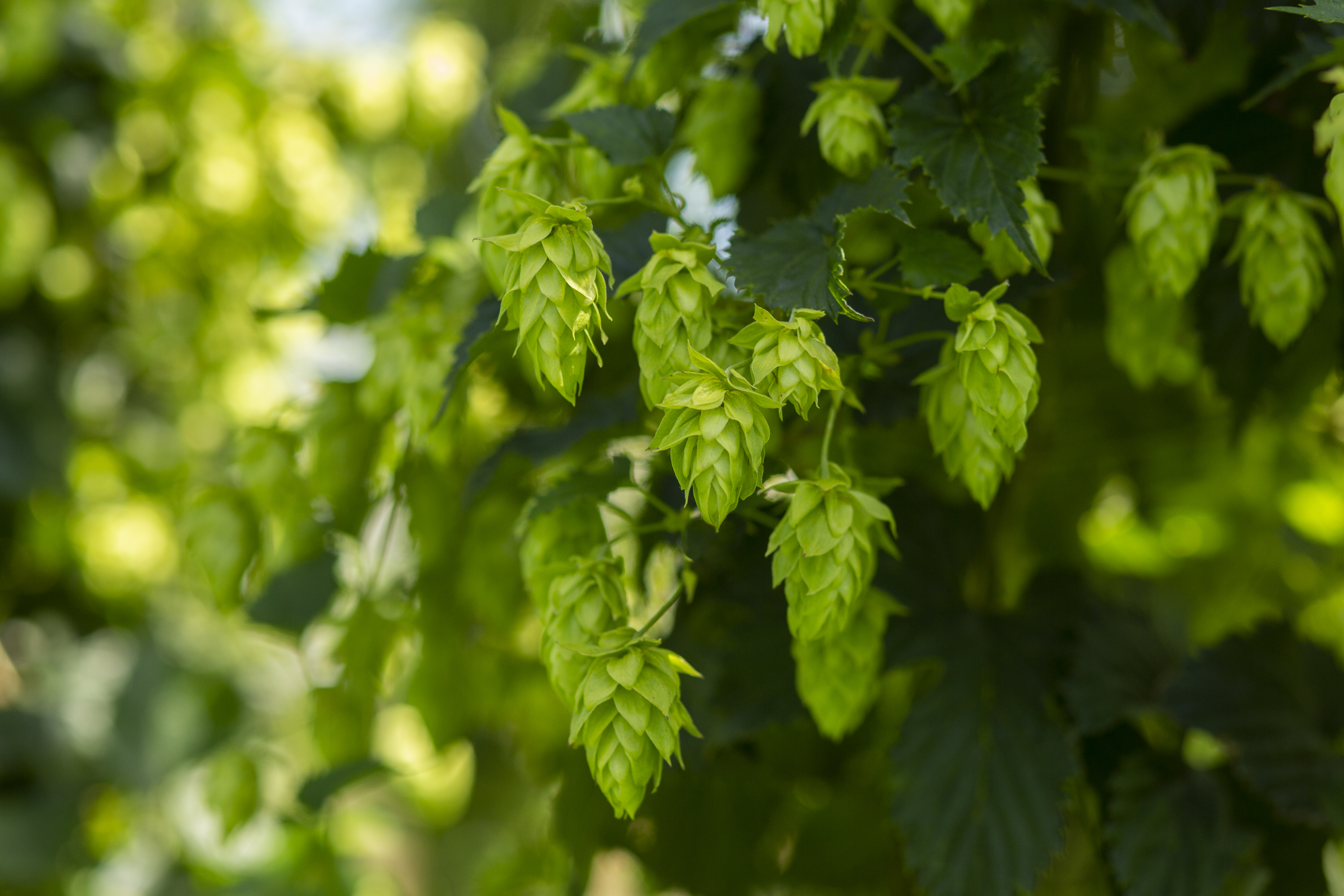
Flowers of hops, Humulus lupulus

Amarasate is a supplement developed to trigger the "Bitter Brake" satiety mechanism, whereby bitter foods targeted to the small intestine trigger the release of the same appetite suppressing gut hormones that are typically elevated after a meal.

The Bitter Brake concept was developed based on a combination of historical data supporting the use of bitter foods as a means to suppress appetite, and the discovery of bitter taste receptors (TAS2Rs) in appetite regulating enteroendocrine cells of the gastrointestinal tract. In vitro and biopsy research had identified TAS2Rs throughout the gastrointestinal tract and over 900 plant compounds were tested, with amarasate found to be a potent TAS2R activator.

The role of gastrointestinal taste receptors has been examined in animal and human trials and a 2021 meta-analysis determined that pre-meal treatment with bitter compounds reduced energy intake, concluding that "bitter stimuli are most potent to influence eating behaviour".

== Scientific research ==
Amarasate capsules have been clinical tested and demonstrated to reduce hunger and emptiness, to decrease food intake and to increase blood concentrations of appetite suppressing gut peptide hormones CCK, GLP-1 and PYY. Amarasate was developed on the concept that by activating bitter taste receptors (TAS2Rs), in the gastrointestinal tract, it would stimulate the release of these gut-derived hormones and potentially lead to weight loss.

Clinical and laboratory research indicates that Amarasate increases GLP-1 and CCK to six times baseline levels, approximately twice the normal post-meal hormone response, within one hour of ingestion. This response mimics the body's natural satiety mechanisms without the use of external GLP-1 agonists.

Three small clinical trials have been published, in normal humans:

- A 2019 trial in 30 healthy men who fasted for 24 hours showed a 25–30% reduction in hunger scores with Amarasate compared to the placebo.
- In a 2022 randomized, crossover study of 19 healthy-weight men, Amarasate reduced energy intake by 18% at an ad libitum meal. It also significantly elevated GLP-1 and CCK levels.
- A 2024 study involving 30 healthy adult women under fasting conditions found a 40% reduction in food cravings, along with a 30% drop in hunger and a 14.3% reduction in rebound eating.
- In a 2026 24-week placebo-controlled study of adults, Amarasate was shown to reduce body weight by 5.3% and significantly lower both total and visceral body fat, without any loss to lean muscle mass.

== Product ==
The extract is available commercially as Calocurb, an oral dietary supplement for appetite management which was launched in New Zealand in 2018. The capsule has an enteric coating to pass through the stomach and allow delivery to the small intestine.

== Safety Profile ==
Amarasate has been well tolerated in human trials, with no serious adverse events reported. Mild gastrointestinal symptoms such as bloating or nausea have occasionally been observed, typically resolving without intervention. The extract is derived from a food source (hops) traditionally used in brewing and is generally recognized as safe (GRAS) by the FDA for use in dietary supplements.
