= Beer fault =

Beer deterioration due to wrong production process or storage conditions

A beer fault or defect is a flavour deterioration caused by chemical changes of organic compounds in beer due to either improper production processes or improper storage. Chemicals that can cause flavour defects in beer are aldehydes (such as dactyl organic acids), lipids, and sulfur compounds. Small fluctuations within fermentation byproducts can lead to the concentration of one or more of these chemicals falling outside a standard range, creating a flavour defect. It is also possible that during the malting process, microbial deterioration may occur, which leads to the loss of beer flavor.

== Diacetyl ==
Diacetyl

Diacetyl is a chemical compound produced in yeast during fermentation and later reabsorbed. If the external ambient temperature during fermentation is lower than 26 °C (79 °F), diacetyl is absorbed insufficiently, resulting in a threshold of less than 0.04 mg/liter in beer, which gives the beer a mouthfeel similar to cream cheese. The resulting odor will persist over time. Since the decomposition of α-acetolactate produces a large amount of diacetyl, beer flavour defects caused by diacetyl can be avoided by boiling the container and cleaning it before the yeast fermentation. The wort should avoid contact with oxygen when the fermentation begins. If the temperature is raised by 2°-3° within 2 minutes of the end of the fermentation process, this allows the yeast to reabsorb faster.

=== Risotto taste ===
Beer can have the taste of glutinous rice if the concentration of diacetyl in the beer exceeds its low taste threshold. For light-colored lagers, the diacetyl content is preferably below 0.1 mg/L; For high-grade beer, it should remain below 0.05 mg/L. The solution is to increase the alpha-amino nitrogen content of the wort appropriately. Generally, the content of 12P wort is controlled to be 180 ± 20 mg/L. Because the precursors of diacetyl and other yeast metabolic by-products are mostly produced during yeast breeding, the yeast proliferation rate can be reduced by adopting a series of measures such as low-temperature inoculation, inoculum, and low-temperature fermentation, as well as increasing the fermentation temperature in the late stage of the main fermentation.

== Acids that cause beer fault ==
The acids produced during the fermentation of raw materials or during fermentation by yeast are present in a large concentration in beer. When the acids exceed 170 mg/litre, a strong sour taste of yogurt or pepper is likely, causing significant flavour defects in beer. A hygienic production environment, mashing the yeast strain for less than two hours, and keeping the fermentation temperature lower than 50 °C (122 °F) all help to reduce the amount of acid in beer. Using non-marking brewing supplies and equipment prevents bacteria remaining in scratches of the fermentation device, thus contaminating the yeast in the process.

=== Octanoic ===
Octanoic acid

Octanoic acid (caprylic acid) is a fatty acid produced by the metabolism of yeast during fermentation. When the content of octanoic acid in the beer exceeds 4–6 mg/L, the beer will have a highly concentrated spicy taste. Storage of beer in an environment below 26 °C (79 °F) will reduce the spicy taste. The use of fresh yeast and removal of the beer from the yeast cake immediately after the fermentation process also keeps the octanoic acid content within the threshold.

Butyric acid

=== Butyric ===
Butyric acid is an acid produced by bacteria that produce syrup for beer, or can be produced during wort production. When the content of butyric acid in beer exceeds 2–3 mg/litre, the beer tastes like metamorphic milk or rotten butter. To avoid this result, acidic sputum should be kept above 90 °F and have minimal contact with oxygen. The beer production environment must be clean. External factors such as pollution during syrup manufacture can also control the content of butyric acid.

Isovaleric acid

=== Isovaleric ===
Isovaleric acid is an acid produced by mixing octanoic acid in the oxidation of alpha acids in beer, which causes the beer to have an odor. The acid is present in the beer at a level of from 0.7 to 1 mg per litre. A clean and hygienic production environment avoids the mixing of caprylic acid with isovaleric acid. Hops stored in an oxygen-free vacuum tight container prevents bacterial infection.

== Aldehydes ==
=== Acetaldehyde ===
Acetaldehyde causes beer to taste like green apples when its concentration exceeds the threshold 5–15 mg/L. During the fermentation of beer, the ethanol in yeast can make contact with air if stored improperly, leading to an oxidation reaction that turns it into acetaldehyde. To prevent formation of acetaldehyde, fresh yeast should be fermented at a suitable ambient temperature, and the production environment should be hygienic. After the start of the fermentation, sealing the ingredients with materials of high sealing property prevents oxygen contact. Highly airtight materials used during transportation can reduce oxygen entering the beer.

=== Phenols ===
The presence threshold of phenols in beer is 0.05-0.55 mg/L, and beer with phenolic content exceeding this threshold has a bitter and smoky flavor. Using tap water, which contains chlorophenol or chlorine water as a disinfectant, as yeast washing water can raise the beer's phenolic acid content after brewing. Phenolic acid content can be reduced by filtering tap water prior to use, and by selecting non-chlorine disinfectants.

== Hydrogen sulfide ==
Hydrogen sulfide produces a rotten egg flavour in beer. Many yeast strains can produce hydrogen sulfide during the fermentation process. Sulfur is also produced in hops, as well as during malt manufacturing or wort preparation, although the process of wort boiling removes most of the sulfides. The threshold of hydrogen sulfide in beer is 4 μg/L. Using healthy yeast and fully oxidized wort increases its zinc content and reduces its hydrogen sulfide content.

== Ferrous sulfate ==
Ferrous sulfate is caused by the contact of beer with metal materials during the brewing process, resulting in metal ion leaching. Excessive levels of ferrous sulfate can make beer taste like rusty iron and copper. If ferrous sulfate in beer exceeds 1.5 mg/L, drinkers will develop symptoms of dizziness. To prevent the formation of ferrous sulfate, the water used for brewing is subjected to a metal ion reaction. Containers for fermented and finished beer should use food-grade plastics, and beer should not come in contact with corrodible containers.

== Dimethyl Sulfide ==
Dimethyl sulfide creates a sour-sweet cream flavour when it exceeds 0.025 mg/L in beer. Dimethyl sulfide is derived from sulfur-based organic compounds produced during malt development. Bacterial contamination during the fermentation of yeast can also cause the production of dimethyl sulfide. If the beer uses malts of sulfur-based organic compounds such as barley malt, the content of dimethyl sulfide will be higher than normal; reducing the use of such products prevents this type of defect. Too much water in the wort can also produce large amounts of sulfur-based organic compounds, which can be avoided by storing the malt in a dry environment. Boiling wort at a high temperature for 60 – 90 minutes removes 90% of dimethyl sulfide.

== Oxidation ==
Oxidised beer has the moldy taste of old newspapers. Beer with 100% oxygen exposure has the fastest oxidation rate. Temperature is another cause of oxidation, as it produces a lot of oxygen in a high-temperature environment. To avoid excessive beer exposure to oxygen, the headspace reserved for the beer in the bottle should be less than one inch. If the beer is to be stored, the temperature inside its container should be kept below 50 °F (10 °C).

== Thiols ==
Beers with thiols (also known as mercaptans) can have flavours similar to rotten vegetables or smelly gullies. The threshold for mercaptans in beer is 1 mg/L. Mercaptans are caused by autolysis in the fermentation process of yeast strains, and may also be caused by anaerobic bacterial infection. This can be prevented by removing the beer from the yeast four weeks after the start of the fermentation, thus avoiding the beer absorbing the mercaptan from the dead yeast.

== Lightstruck ==
Being lightstruck causes a sulfur taste. Its cause is the chemical reaction between riboflavin and hop alpha acid in beer under natural light or artificial light.

== Detecting Beer Faults ==
Historically, inspectors had their own methods for testing the quality of beer or checking for specific faults; one example of this is testing if the beer contains too much sugar, which apocryphally involved the inspector pouring a small amount onto his chair and sitting down to see if his clothing stuck to the seat. In the present day, there are guides that explain what to look for and how to detect specific faults by taste, smell, and texture/mouthfeel.

== See also ==
- Beer chemistry
- Wine fault
