= Nucleation in microcellular foaming =

Nucleation process in microcellular foaming

In microcellular plastics, Nucleation is the first step in creating microcellular foams. In this process, a polymer is first saturated with a gas under high pressure, when the pressure is reduced, the gas becomes unstable in the polymer and nuclei (small bubbles) form. These nuclei then evolve into the cells that give the foam its structure.

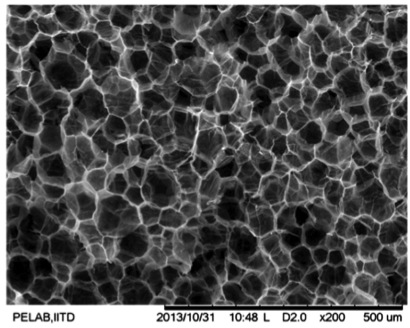
Microcellular foam without ultrasonication

Nucleation happens continuously as the pressure drops, faster pressure reduction produces more bubbles because the gas becomes supersaturated more quickly. The cell size, cell density and cell morphology is established when gas diffusion limits growth.

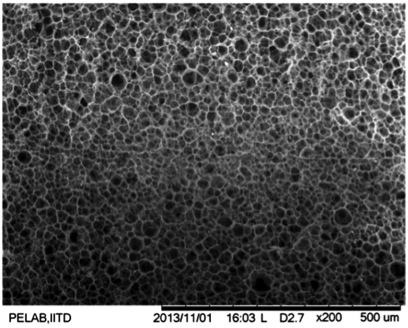
Microcellular foam with ultrasonication

Factors that affect nucleation include:

Gas concentration
more dissolved gas creates more bubbles
Pressure drop rate
faster depressurization encourages more nuclei
Temperature and polymer properties
softer polymers make it easier for bubbles to form

Studies were performed with ultrasound induced nucleation during microcellular foaming of Acrylonitrile butadiene styrene polymers. M.C.Guo studied nucleation under the shear action. As the shear enhanced, the cell size diminished and thereby increased the cell density in the foam.
