= Adolf Ferdinand Wenceslaus Brix =

German mathematician (1798–1870)

Adolf Brix
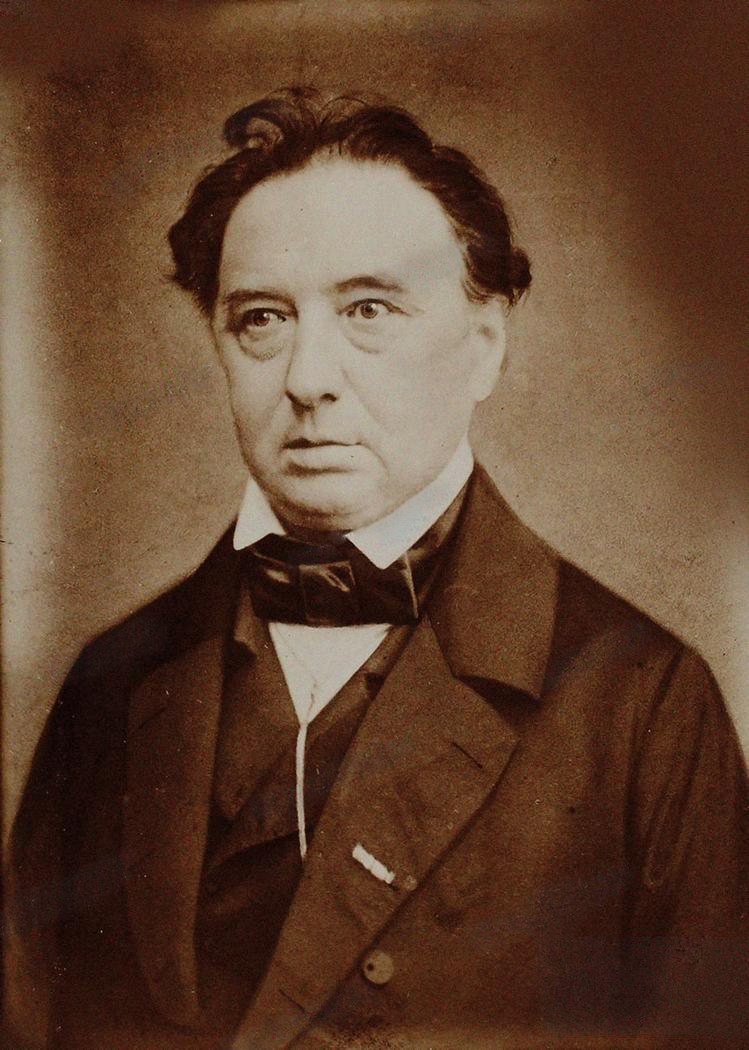
- Born: Adolf Ferdinand Wenceslaus Brix; 20 February 1798; Wesel, Kingdom of Prussia
- Died: 14 February 1870 (aged 71); German
- Occupations: Mathematician, engineer

Adolf Ferdinand Wenceslaus Brix (20 February 1798 – 14 February 1870) was a German mathematician and engineer. The unit for specific gravity of liquids, degree Brix (°Bx), is named after him.

Brix made a career as a civil servant in professions related to civil engineering, measurements and manufacture (1827 Bauconducteur, 1834 Fabriken-Commisionsrath, 1853 geheimer Regierungsrath) and retired in 1866 (when he was promoted to geheimer Oberregierungsrath). He was director of the Royal Prussian Commission for Measurements, member of a technical committee in the Ministry of Trade, and the technical building committee. He was also a teacher of applied mathematics at Gewerbeinstitut zu Berlin (1828–1850), as well as in higher analysis and applied mathematics at the Bauakademie, both of which are forerunners of Technische Universität Berlin.

He participated in many public works in Berlin and Potsdam.

== Selected publications ==
- Lehrbuch der Statik und Mechanik ("Textbook of statics and mechanics", 1831, 2nd edition 1849, supplement 1843)
- Über Festigkeit und Elasticität der Eisendrähte ("On the strength and elasticity of iron wires"), 1847
- Über den Widerstand der Fuhrwerke ("On the drag of wagons"), 1850
- Über Alkoholometrie ("On the measurement of alcohol"), 1850, 1851, 1856
