= Isohumulone =

Names
- IUPAC name 3,4-Dihydroxy-5-(3-methylbut- 2-enyl)-2-(3-methyl-1-oxobutyl)-4-(4- methyl-1-oxopent-3-enyl)-1- cyclopent-2-enone

Identifiers
CAS Number	25522-96-7
3D model (JSmol)	Interactive image
ChemSpider	84039
ECHA InfoCard	100.042.778
PubChem CID	93090
UNII	E2S413495Y
CompTox Dashboard (EPA)	DTXSID90948427
- InChI: InChI=1S/C21H30O5/c1-12(2)7-9-15-19(24)18(16(22)11-14(5)6)20(25)21(15,26)17(23)10-8-13(3)4/h7-8,14-15,25-26H,9-11H2,1-6H3 Key: QARXXMMQVDCYGZ-UHFFFAOYSA-N; InChI=1/C21H30O5/c1-12(2)7-9-15-19(24)18(16(22)11-14(5)6)20(25)21(15,26)17(23)10-8-13(3)4/h7-8,14-15,25-26H,9-11H2,1-6H3 Key: QARXXMMQVDCYGZ-UHFFFAOYAV
- SMILES: O=C(C1(O)C(/O)=C(\C(=O)C1C/C=C(/C)C)C(=O)CC(C)C)C\C=C(/C)C

Properties
Chemical formula	C_{21}H_{30}O_{5}
Molar mass	362.466 g·mol^{−1}
- Except where otherwise noted, data are given for materials in their standard state (at 25 °C [77 °F], 100 kPa). verify (what is ?) Infobox references

Isohumulones are chemical compounds that contribute to the bitter taste of beer and are in the class of compounds known as iso-alpha acids. They are found in hops.

== Beer ==
The bitterness of beer is measured according to the International Bitterness Units scale, with one IBU corresponding to one part-per-million of isohumulone. When beer is exposed to light, these compounds can decompose in a reaction catalyzed by riboflavin to generate free-radical species by the homolytic cleavage of the exocyclic carbon-carbon bond. The cleaved acyl side-chain radical then decomposes further, expelling carbon monoxide and generating 1,1-dimethylallyl radical. This radical can finally react with sulfur-containing amino acids, such as cysteine, to create 3-methylbut-2-ene-1-thiol, a thiol which causes beer to develop a "skunky" flavor.

=== Formation ===
Isohumulones are generated by the isomerization of humulone.

Isomerization of humulone to cis- and trans-isohumulone

== See also ==
- Beer chemistry
