= Fritz Plato =

German chemist

Fritz Plato (1858 – 1938) was a German chemist. The unit for specific gravity of liquids, degree Plato, is named after him.

Plato made a career as a civil servant in professions related to chemistry and was a civil servant.
