= Hops =

Flower used to flavour beer and other beverages

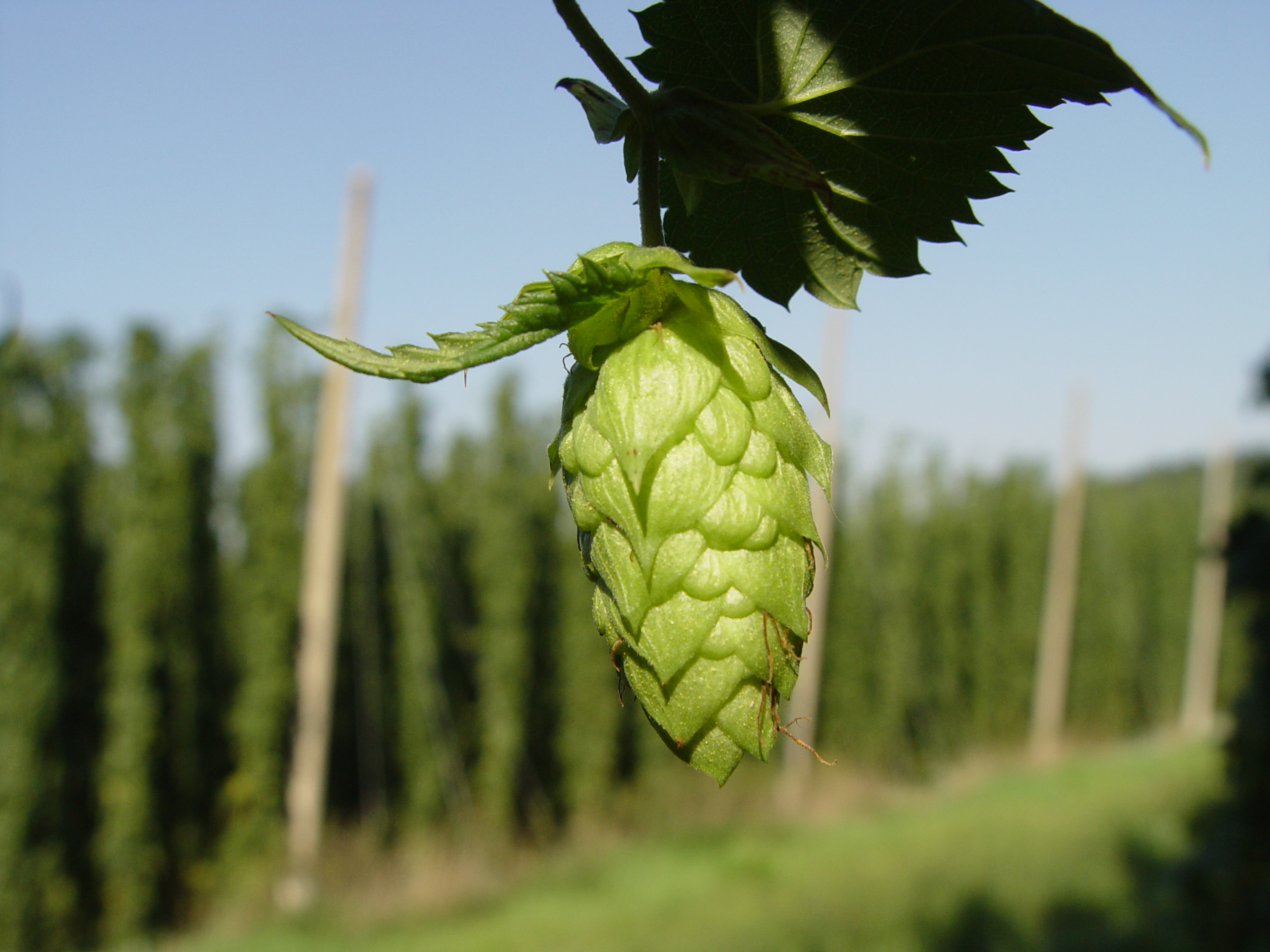
Hop flower in a hop yard in the Hallertau, Germany

Cross-section drawing of a hop

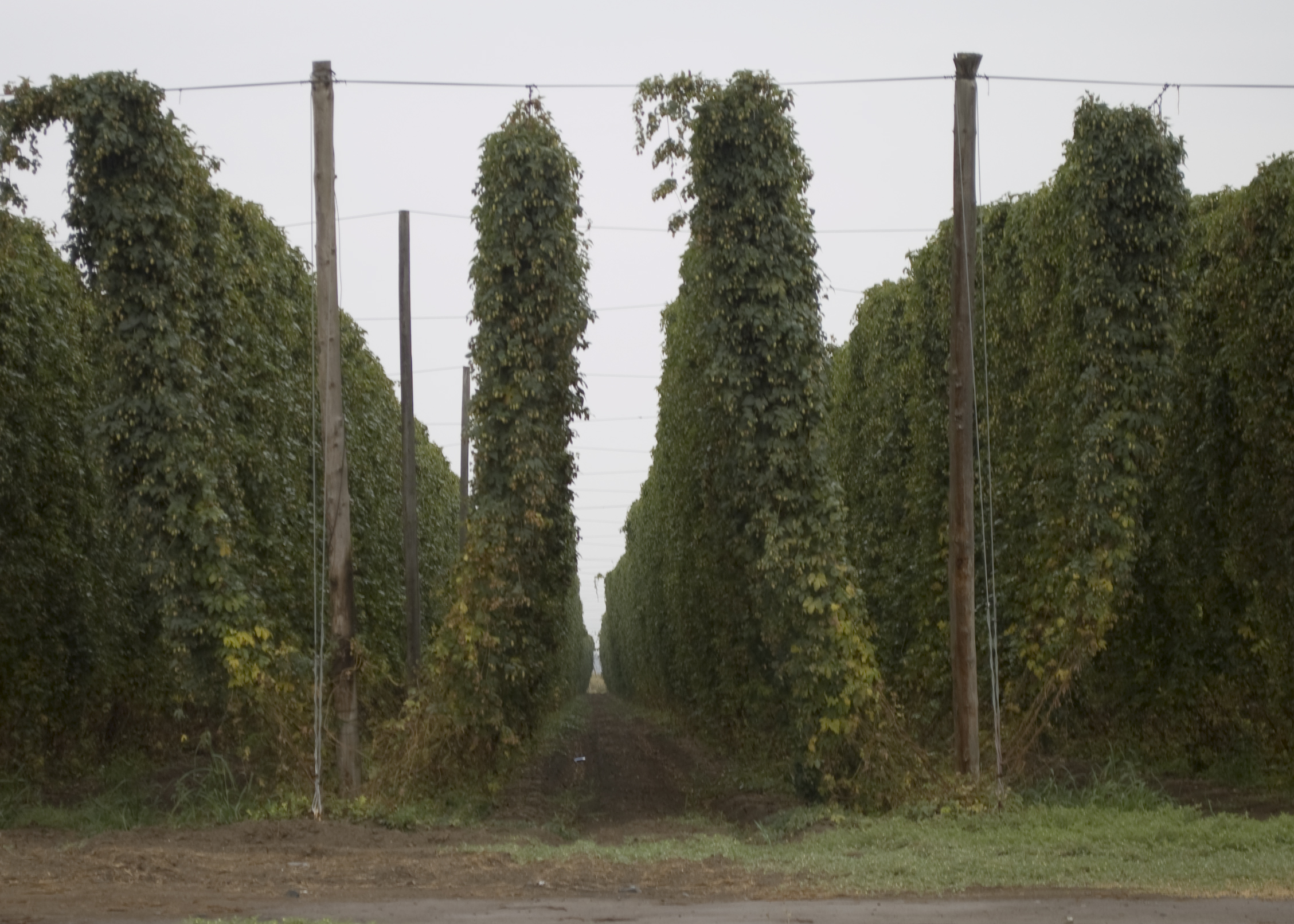
Fully grown hops bines ready for harvest on the Yakama Indian Reservation

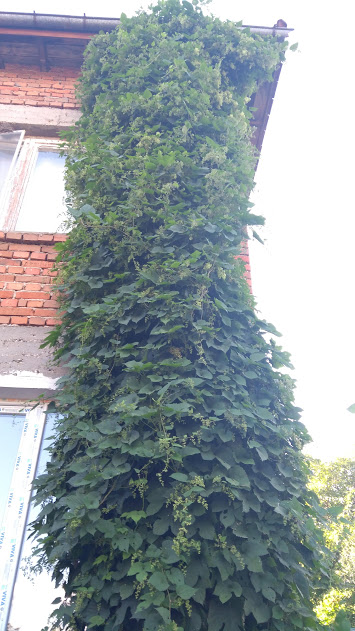
Humulus on a house

Hops are the green flowers (also called seed cones or strobiles) of the hop plant Humulus lupulus, a member of the Cannabaceae family of flowering plants. They are used primarily as a bittering, flavouring, and stability agent in beer, to which, in addition to bitterness, they impart floral, fruity, or citrus flavours and aromas. Hops are also used in other beverages and herbal medicine. The hops plants have separate female and male plants, and only female plants are used for commercial production. The hop plant is a vigorous climbing herbaceous perennial, usually trained to grow up strings in a field called a hopfield, hop garden (in the South of England), or hop yard (in the West Country and United States) when grown commercially. Many different varieties of hops are grown by farmers around the world, with different types used for particular styles of beer.

The first documented use of hops in beer is from the 9th century, though Hildegard of Bingen, 300 years later, is often cited as the earliest documented source. Before this period, brewers used a "gruit", composed of a wide variety of bitter herbs and flowers, including dandelion, burdock root, marigold, horehound (the old German name for horehound, Berghopfen, means 'mountain hops'), ground ivy, and heather. Early documents include mention of a hop garden in the will of Charlemagne's father, Pepin the Short.

Hops are also used in brewing for their antibacterial effect over less desirable microorganisms and for purported benefits including balancing the sweetness of the malt with bitterness and a variety of flavours and aromas. It is believed that traditional herb combinations for beers were abandoned after it was noticed that beers made with hops were less prone to spoilage.

== History ==
The first documented hop cultivation was in 736, in the Hallertau region of present-day Germany. In 768, hop gardens were left to the Cloister of Saint-Denis in a will of Pepin the Short, the father of Charlemagne. The first mention of hops being used in German brewing was in 1079.

Not until the 13th century did hops begin to start threatening the use of gruit for flavouring. Gruit was used when the nobility levied taxes on hops. Whichever was taxed made the brewer switch to the other.

In Britain, hopped beer was first imported from Holland around 1400, yet hops were condemned as late as 1519 as a "wicked and pernicious weed".

In Germany, using hops was also a religious and political choice in the early 16th century. There was no tax on hops to be paid to the Catholic Church, unlike on gruit. For this reason, Protestants preferred hopped beer.

Hops used in England were imported from France, Holland and Germany and were subject to import duty; it was not until 1524 that hops were first grown in the southeast of England (Kent), when they were introduced as an agricultural crop by Dutch farmers. Consequently, many words used in the hop industry derive from the Dutch language. Hops were then grown as far north as Aberdeen, near breweries for convenience of infrastructure.

According to Thomas Tusser's 1557 Five Hundred Points of Good Husbandry:

The hop for his profit I thus do exalt,
It strengtheneth drink and it flavoureth malt;
And being well-brewed long kept it will last,
And drawing abide, if ye draw not too fast.

In England there were many complaints over the quality of imported hops, the sacks of which were often contaminated by stalks, sand or straw to increase their weight. As a result, in 1603, King James I approved an Act of Parliament banning the practice by which "the Subjects of this Realm have been of late years abused &c. to the Value of £20,000 yearly, besides the Danger of their Healths".

Hop cultivation was begun in the present-day United States in 1629 by English and Dutch farmers. Before Prohibition, cultivation was mainly centred around New York, California, Oregon, and Washington state. Problems with powdery mildew and downy mildew devastated New York's production by the 1920s, and California produced hops only on a small scale.

== World production ==
Growing zone for commercial hops and important international market beer hop growing areas.
Legend
- Key:
- Growing range from 35° to 55° latitude
- 48° N (highest productivity)
- Clicking on the rectangle icon enables full window and mouse-over with more details.

Hops production is concentrated in moist temperate climates due to the plant's needs, with much of the world's production occurring near the 48th parallel north. Climate change may impact future commercial production. Germany and the United States account for three-quarters of hop production with two-thirds of the total surface area used for hop-growing worldwide. Hop plants prefer the same soils as potatoes; the leading potato-growing states in the United States are also major hops-producing areas. Not all potato-growing areas can produce good hops naturally, however: for example, soils in the Maritime Provinces of Canada lack the boron that hops prefer. Historically, hops were not grown in Ireland, but were imported from England. In 1752 more than 500 tons of English hops were imported through Dublin alone.

Important production centres today are the Hallertau in Germany, the Žatec (Saaz) in the Czech Republic, the Yakima (Washington) and Willamette (Oregon) valleys, and western Canyon County, Idaho (including the communities of Parma, Wilder, Greenleaf, and Notus). The principal production centres in the UK are in Kent (which produces Kent Goldings hops), Herefordshire, and Worcestershire. As essentially all harvested hops are used in beer-making, the notable worldwide producers are orientated towards this market. Other notable regions for hops include Spalt and Tettnang in Germany, Lublin in Poland, Celje in Slovenia, Derwent Valley, Tasmania and High country of Victoria in Australia, Marlborough in New Zealand, Villanueva del Carrizo in Spain, George in South Africa. Countries with notable production include China, France, Japan, Canada, Chile, Argentina, and Ukraine.

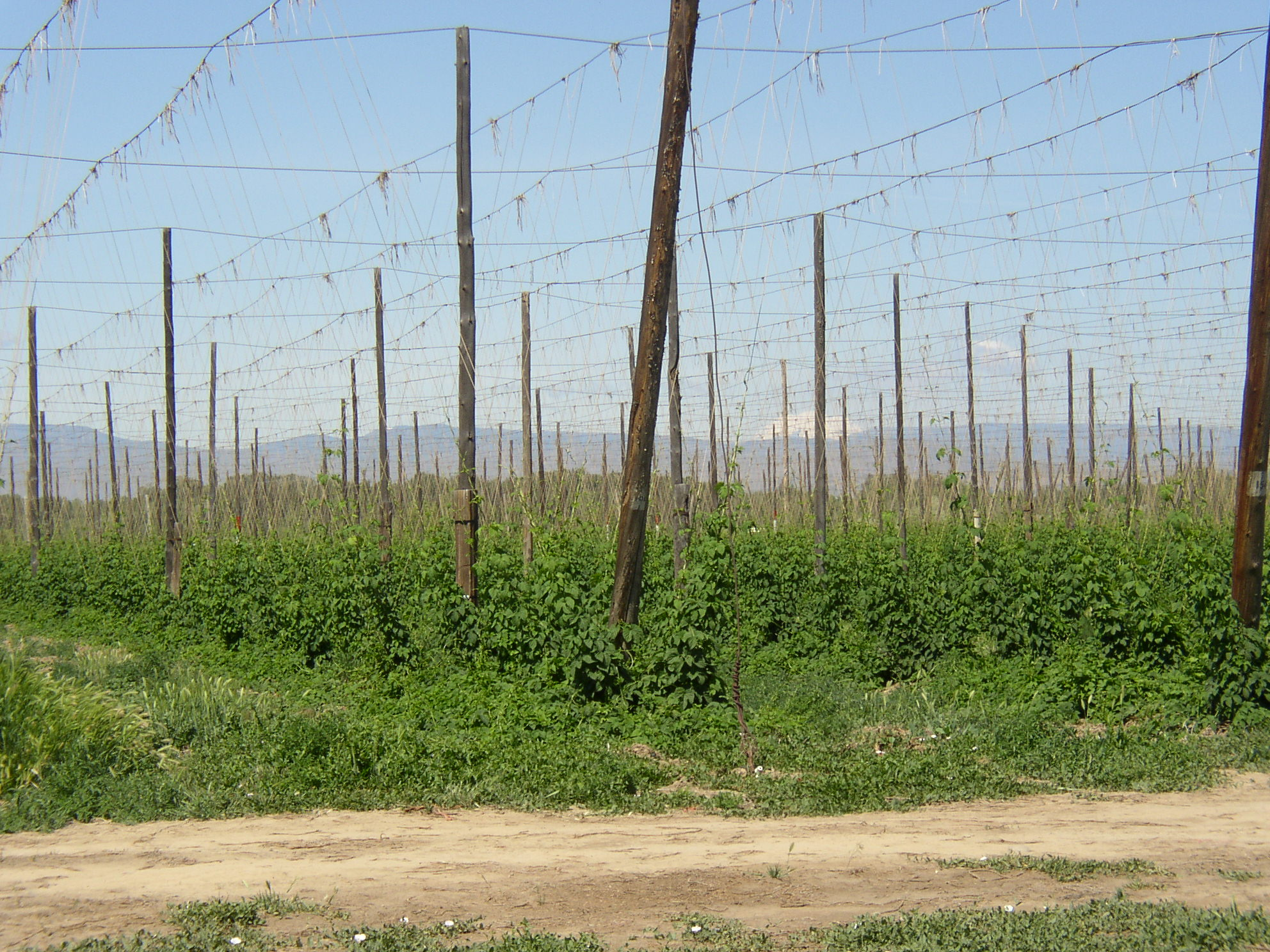
Early season hop growth in a hop yard in the Yakima River Valley of Washington with Mount Adams in the distance

Hop producing country	2020 hop output in tonnes (t)
United States	47,541
Germany	46,878
China	7,044
Czech Republic	5,925
Poland	3,417
Slovenia	2,723
Australia	1,714
New Zealand	1,250
UK/England	924
Spain	908
France	767

=== Cultivation and harvest ===
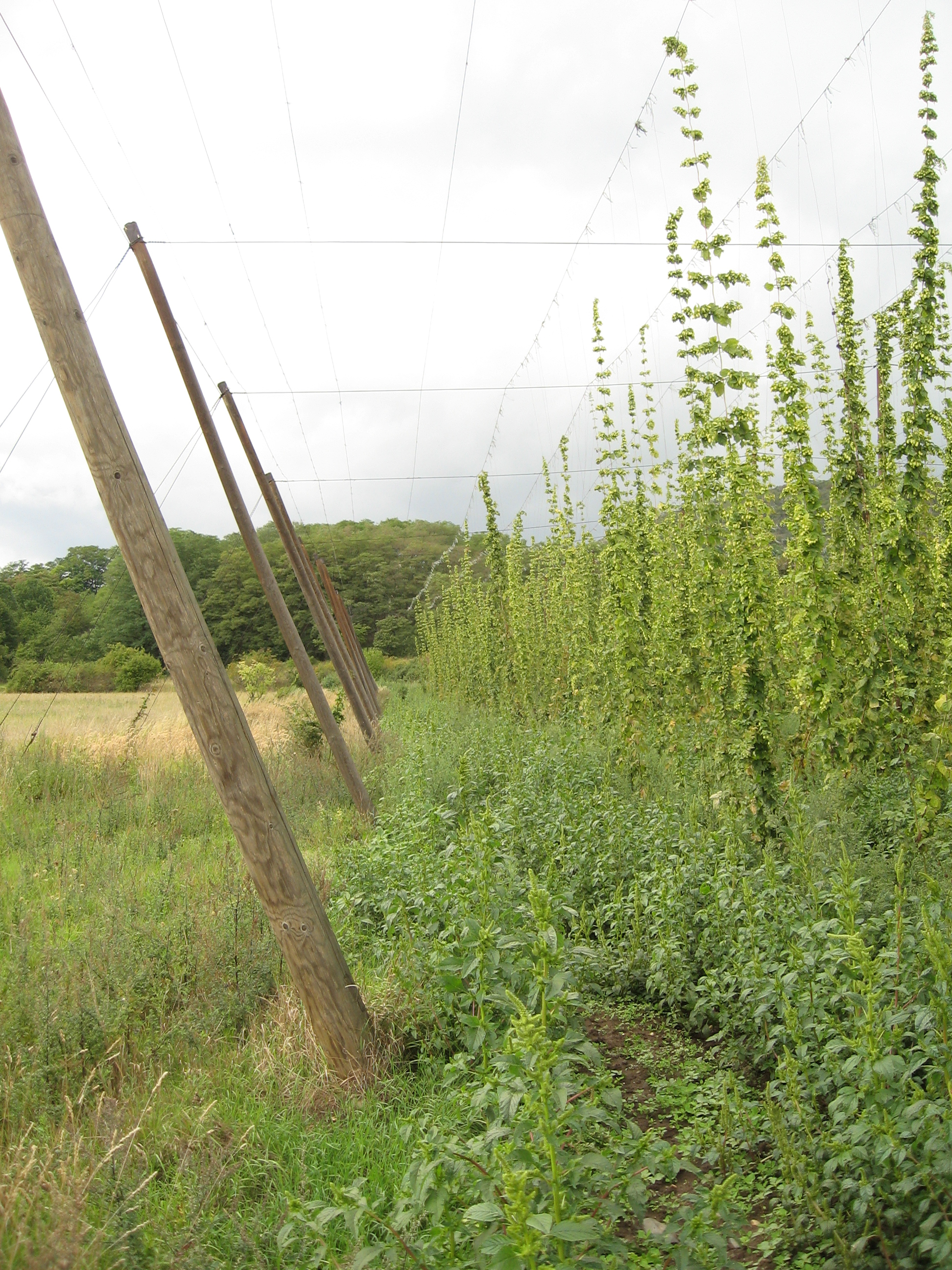
A superstructure of overhead wires supports strings that in turn support bines.

Although hops are grown in most of the continental United States and Canada, cultivation of hops for commercial production requires a particular environment. As hops are a climbing plant, they are trained to grow up trellises made from strings or wires that support the plants and allow them significantly greater growth with the same sunlight profile. In this way, energy that would have been required to build structural cells is also freed for crop growth.

The hop plant's reproduction method is that male and female flowers develop on separate plants, although occasionally a fertile individual will develop which contains both male and female flowers. Because pollinated seeds are undesirable for brewing beer, only female plants are grown in hop fields, thus preventing pollination. Female plants are propagated vegetatively, and male plants are culled if plants are grown from seeds.

Hop plants are planted in rows about 2 to 2.5 metres (7 to 8 ft) apart. Each spring, the roots send forth new bines that are started up strings from the ground to an overhead trellis. The cones grow high on the bine, and in the past, these cones were picked by hand. Harvesting of hops became much more efficient with the invention of the mechanical hops separator, patented by Emil Clemens Horst in 1909.

Hops are harvested at the end of summer. The bines are cut down, separated, and then dried in an oast house to reduce moisture content. To be dried, the hops are traditionally spread out on the upper floor of the oast house and heated by heating units on the lower floor. The dried hops are then compressed into bales by a baler. They are now usually dried in kilns with large fans that force clean, heated air, through the hop beds and further processed into pellets which have longer storage properties than whole hops.

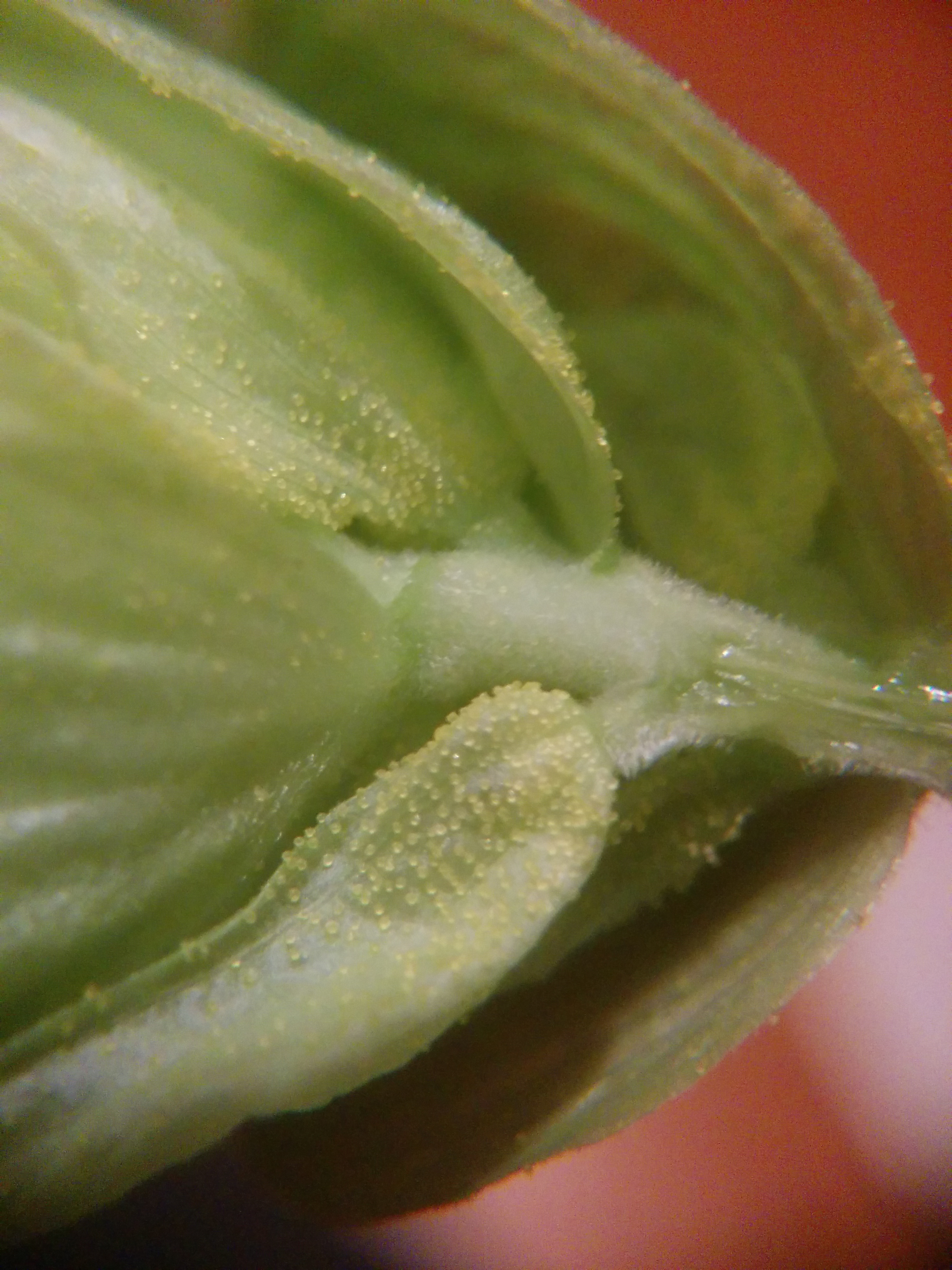
Macro shot of lupulin on a hop's cone

Hop cones contain different oils, such as lupulin, a yellowish, waxy substance, an oleoresin, that imparts flavour and aroma to beer. Lupulin contains lupulone and humulone, which possess antibiotic properties, suppressing bacterial growth favoring brewer's yeast to grow. After lupulin has been extracted in the brewing process the papery cones are discarded.

=== Migrant labor and social impact ===
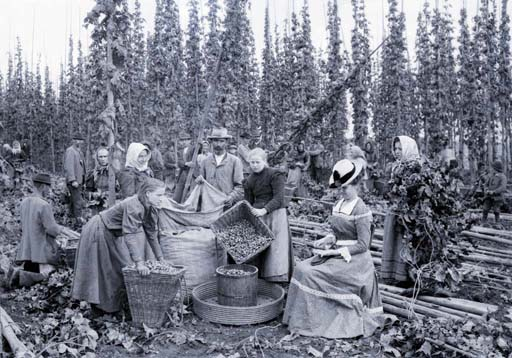
Hops harvest in the Kingdom of Bohemia (1898)

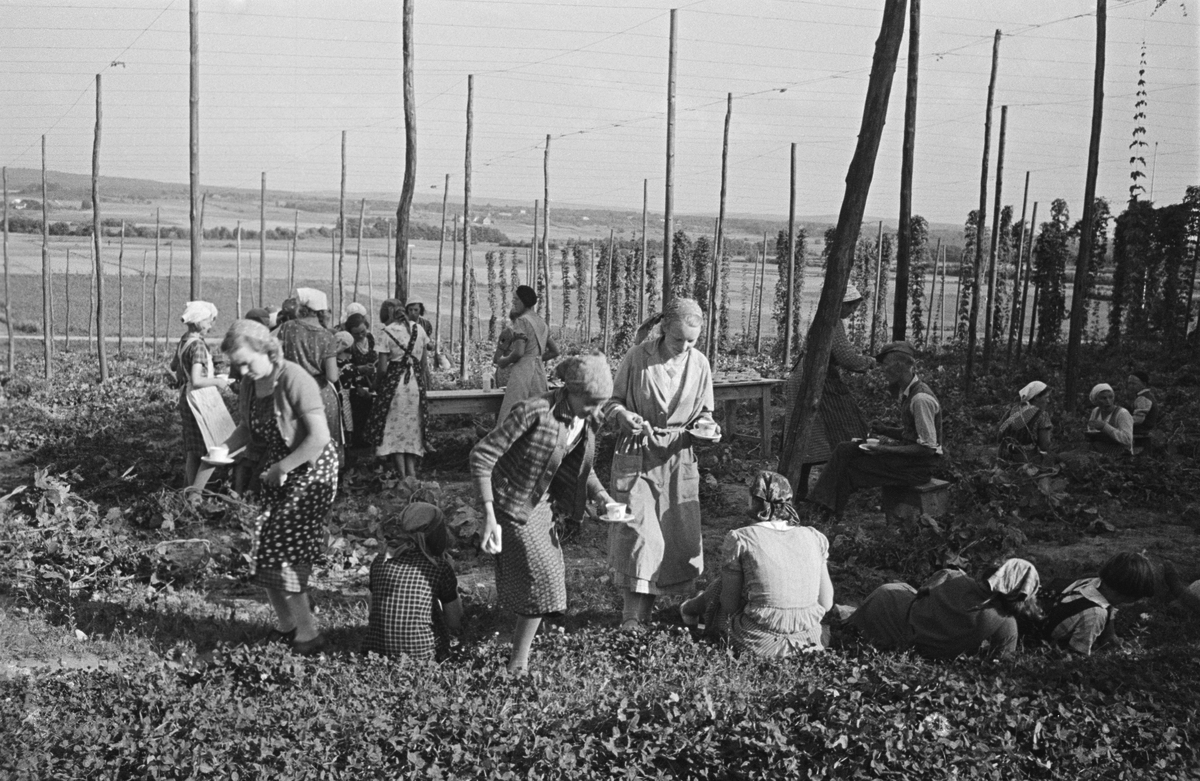
Hops harvest in Skåne, Sweden, in 1937

The need for massed labour at harvest time meant hop-growing had a big social impact. Around the world, the labour-intensive harvesting work involved large numbers of migrant workers who would travel for the annual hop harvest. Whole families would participate and live in hoppers' huts, with even the smallest children helping in the fields. The final chapters of W. Somerset Maugham's Of Human Bondage and a large part of George Orwell's A Clergyman's Daughter contain a vivid description of London families participating in this annual hops harvest. In England, many of those picking hops in Kent were from eastern areas of London. This provided a break from urban conditions that was spent in the countryside. People also came from Birmingham and other Midlands cities to pick hops in the Malvern area of Worcestershire. Some photographs have been preserved.

The often-appalling living conditions endured by hop pickers during the harvest became a matter of scandal across Kent and other hop-growing counties. Eventually, the Rev. John Young Stratton, Rector of Ditton, Kent, began to gather support for reform, resulting in 1866 in the formation of the Society for the Employment and Improved Lodging of Hop Pickers. The hop-pickers were given very basic accommodation, with very poor sanitation. This led to the spread of infectious diseases and led to contaminated water. The 1897 Maidstone typhoid epidemic was partly as a result of hop-pickers camping near the Farleigh Springs which supplied Maidstone with water.

Particularly in Kent, because of a shortage of small-denomination coin of the realm, many growers issued their own currency to those doing the labor. In some cases, the coins issued were adorned with fanciful hops images, making them quite beautiful.

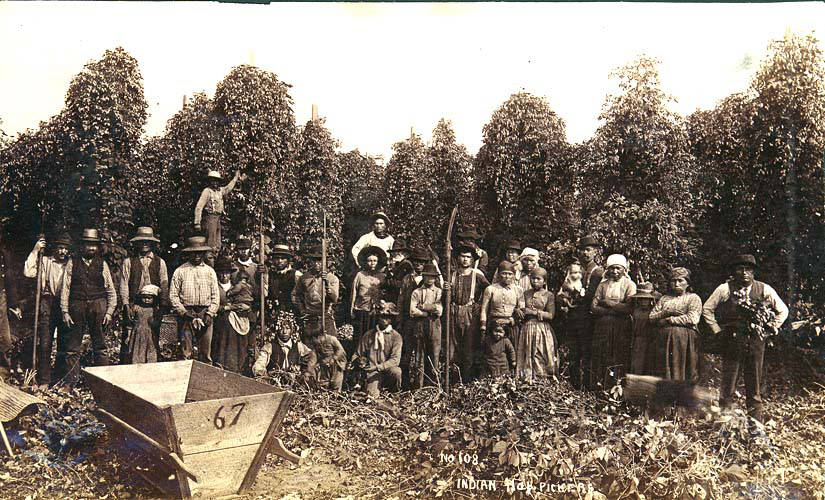
Puget Sound region, Washington, c. 1893

In the United States, Prohibition had a serious adverse effect on hops production, but remnants of this significant industry in the western states are still noticeable in the form of old hop kilns that survive throughout Sonoma County, California, among others. Florian Dauenhauer, of Santa Rosa in Sonoma County, became a manufacturer of hop-harvesting machines in 1940, in part because of the hop industry's importance to the county. This mechanization helped destroy the local industry by enabling large-scale mechanized production, which moved to larger farms in other areas.

== Chemical composition ==
In addition to water, cellulose, and various proteins, hops contain compounds that impart flavour and aroma to beer.

=== Alpha acids ===
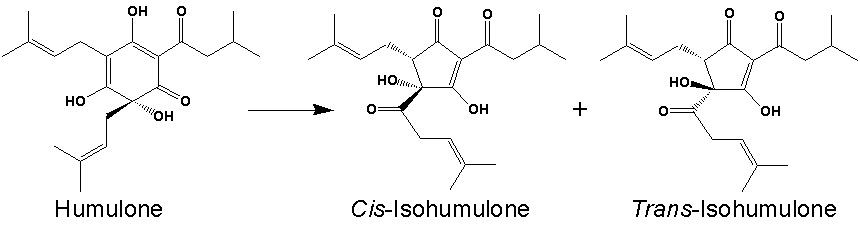
Isomerization scheme of humulone

Hops contain alpha acids or humulones. During wort boiling, the humulones are thermally isomerized into iso-alpha acids or isohumulones, which give a bitter flavour to beer.

=== Beta acids ===
Structure of lupulone (beta acid)

Hops contain beta acids or lupulones, contributing aromas to beer.

=== Essential oil ===
Myrcene contributes a pungent smell of fresh hops, together with humulene and caryophyllene, all representing 80-90% of the essential oil in hops.

=== Flavonoids ===
Chemical structure of 8-prenylnaringenin

Xanthohumol is the principal flavonoid, with other prenylflavonoids including 8-prenylnaringenin and isoxanthohumol. 8-prenylnaringenin is a potent phytoestrogen.

== Brewing ==
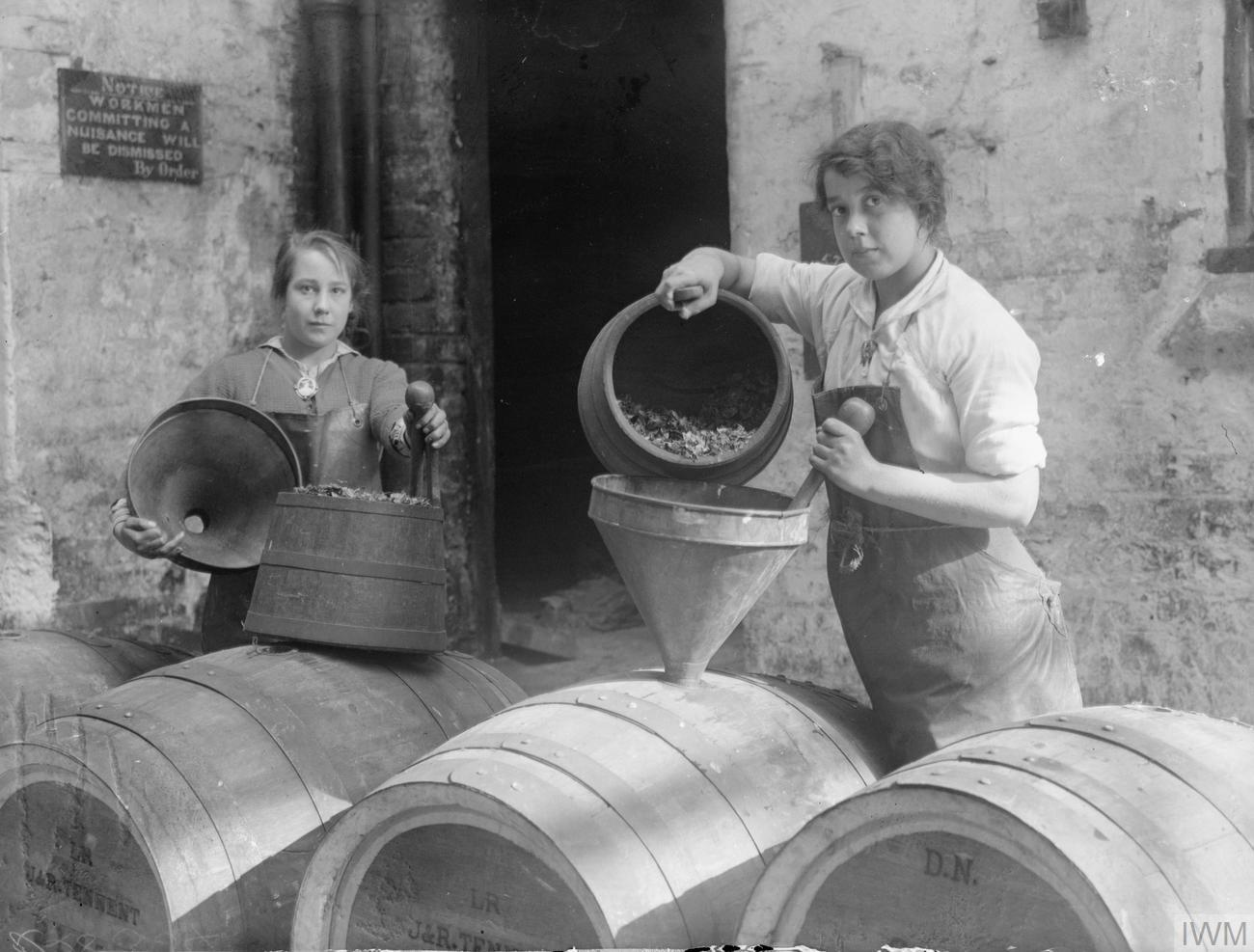
English brewers dry-hopping casks of beer (1918)

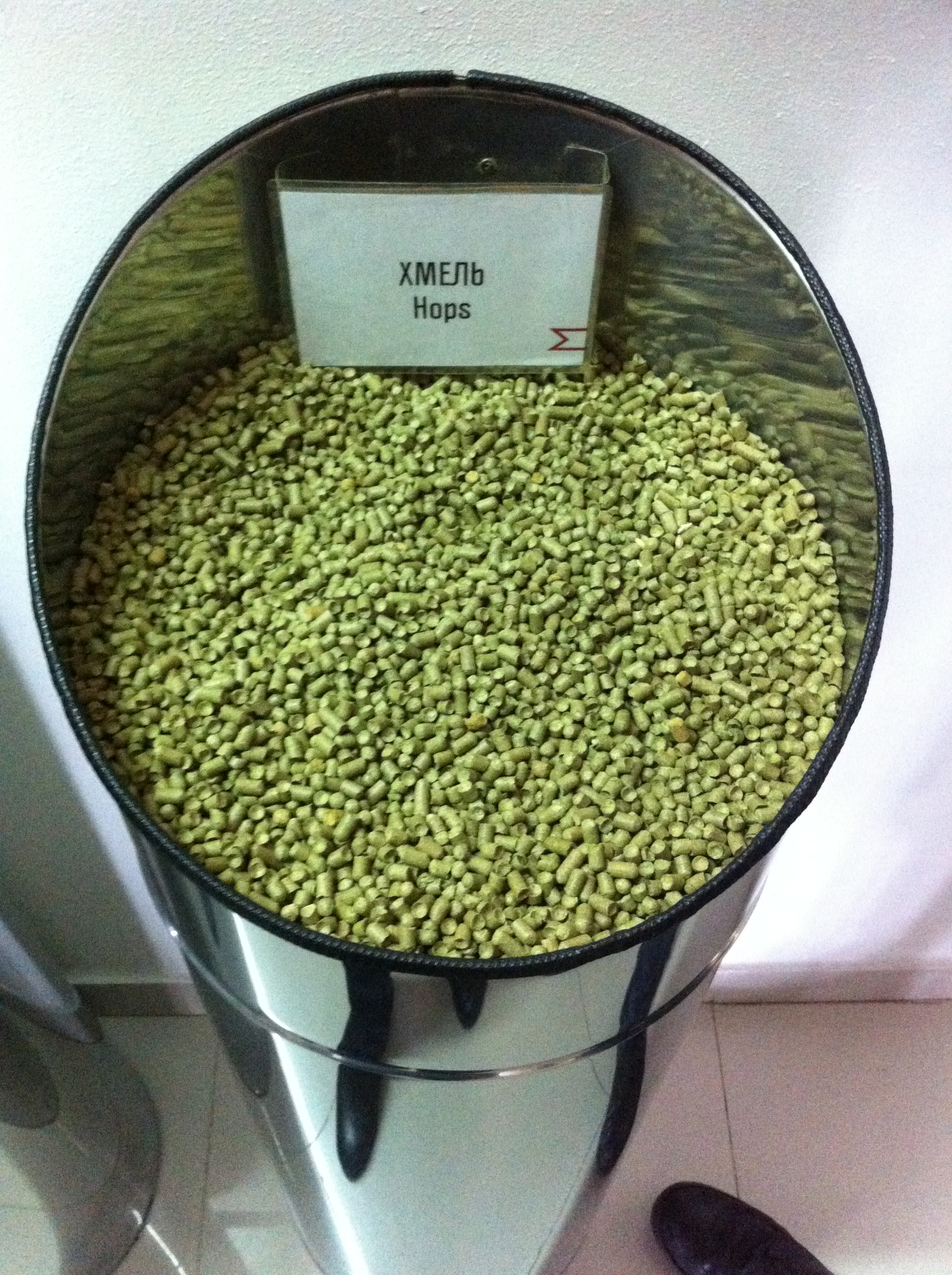
Hops sample

Hops are usually dried in an oast house or now kiln before they are used in the brewing process. Undried or "wet" hops are sometimes (since c. 1990) used.

The wort (sugar-rich liquid produced from malt) is boiled with hops before it is cooled down and yeast is added, to start fermentation.

The effect of hops on the finished beer varies by type and use, though there are two main hop types: bittering and aroma. The characteristics are also determined by the soil the hops are grown on and for example clay-loamy soils can have low yields but excellent aroma and taste.

Bittering hops have higher concentrations of alpha acids, and are responsible for the large majority of the bitter flavour of a beer. European (so-called "noble") hops typically average 5–9% alpha acids by weight (AABW), and the newer American cultivars typically range from 8–19% AABW.

Aroma hops usually have a lower concentration of alpha acids (~5%) and are the primary contributors of hop aroma and (nonbitter) flavour.

Bittering hops are boiled for a longer period of time, typically 60–90 minutes, and often have inferior aromatic properties, as the aromatic compounds evaporate during the boil. The degree of bitterness imparted by hops depends on the degree to which alpha acids are isomerized during the boil, and the impact of a given amount of hops is specified in International Bitterness Units. On the other hand, unboiled hops are only mildly bitter.

Aroma hops are typically added to the wort later to prevent the evaporation of the essential oils, to impart "hop taste" (if during the final 30 minutes of boil) or "hop aroma" (if during the final 10 minutes, or less, of boil). Aroma hops are often added after the wort has cooled and while the beer ferments, a technique known as "dry hopping", which contributes to the hop aroma. Farnesene is a major component in some hops. The composition of hop essential oils can differ between varieties and between years in the same variety, having a significant influence on flavour and aroma.

Dual-use hops have high concentrations of alpha acids and good aromatic properties. These can be added to the boil at any time, depending on the desired effect. Hop acids also contribute to and stabilize the foam qualities of beer.

Flavours and aromas may be described as "grassy", "floral", "citrus", "spicy", "piney", "lemony", "grapefruit", and "earthy".

Many pale lagers have fairly low hop influence, while lagers marketed as Pilsener or brewed in the Czech Republic may have noticeable noble hop aroma. Certain ales (particularly the highly hopped style known as India Pale Ale, or IPA) can have high levels of hop bitterness.

Dried extracts and pellets may replace whole hops in the brewing process to improve efficiency, cost, and storage life, typically at temperatures between −1 and −5 °C (30 and 23 °F).

== Varieties ==
=== Breeding programmes ===
There are many different varieties of hops used in brewing. Historically, hops varieties were identified by geography, i.e., from the towns of Hallertau, Spalt, and Tettnang in Germany, or a region, such as the Neomexicanus hops of New Mexico. Others were named for the farmer recognized as first cultivating them, including Goldings or Fuggles from England, or by their growing habit, like the Oregon Clusters.

Around 1900, a number of institutions began to experiment with breeding specific hop varieties. The breeding program at Wye College in Wye, Kent, was started in 1904 and rose to prominence through the work of Prof. E. S. Salmon. Salmon released Brewer's Gold and Brewer's Favorite for commercial cultivation in 1934, and went on to release more than two dozen new cultivars before his death in 1959. Brewer's Gold has become the ancestor of the bulk of new hop releases around the world since its release.

Wye College continued its breeding program and again received attention in the 1970s, when Dr. Ray A. Neve released Wye Target, Wye Challenger, Wye Northdown, Wye Saxon and Wye Yeoman. More recently, Wye College and its successor institution Wye Hops Ltd., have focused on breeding the first dwarf hop varieties, which are easier to pick by machine and far more economical to grow. Wye College have also been responsible for breeding hop varieties that will grow with only 12 hours of daily light for the South African hop farmers. Wye College was closed in 2009 but the legacy of their hop breeding programs, particularly that of the dwarf varieties, is continuing as already the US private and public breeding programs are using their stock material.

Particular hop varieties are associated with beer regions and styles, for example pale lagers are usually brewed with European (often German, Polish or Czech) noble hop varieties such as Saaz, Hallertau and Strissel Spalt. British ales use hop varieties such as Fuggles, Goldings and W.G.V. North American beers often use Cascade hops, Columbus hops, Centennial hops, Willamette, Amarillo hops and about forty more varieties as the US have lately been the more significant breeders of new hop varieties, including dwarf hop varieties.

In New Zealand, where hop cultivation commenced in 1842, hops have been developed into varieties such as Pacific Gem, Motueka and Nelson Sauvin, being used in a "Pacific Pale Ale" style of beer. By 1985 80% of New Zealand hop production was exported.

=== Noble hops ===
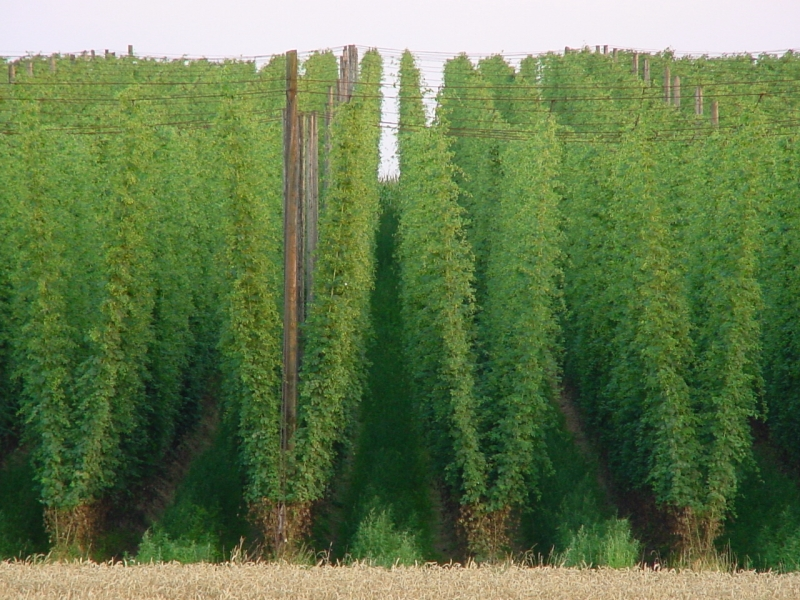
Mature hops growing in a hop yard in Germany

The term "noble hops" is a marketing term that traditionally refers to certain varieties of hops that became known for being low in bitterness and high in aroma. They are the European cultivars or races Hallertau, Tettnanger, Spalt, and Saaz. Some proponents assert that the English varieties Fuggle, East Kent Goldings and Goldings might qualify as "noble hops" due to the similar composition, but such terms are not applied to English varieties. Their low relative bitterness, but strong aroma, are often distinguishing characteristics of European-style lagers, such as Pilsener, Dunkel, and Oktoberfest/Märzen. In beer, they are considered aroma hops (as opposed to bittering hops); see Pilsner Urquell as a classic example of the Bohemian Pilsener style, which showcases noble hops.

As with grapes, the location where hops are grown affects the hops' characteristics. Much as Dortmunder beer may within the EU be labelled "Dortmunder" only if it has been brewed in Dortmund, noble hops may officially be considered "noble" only if they were grown in the areas for which the hop varieties (races) were named.

- Hallertau or Hallertauer: The original German lager hop; named after Hallertau or Holledau region in central Bavaria. Due to susceptibility to crop disease, it was largely replaced by Hersbrucker in the 1970s and 1980s. (Alpha acid 3.5–5.5% / beta acid 3–4%)
- Spalt: Traditional German noble hop from the Spalter region south of Nuremberg. With a delicate, spicy aroma. (Alpha acid 4–5% / beta acid 4–5%)
- Tettnang: Comes from Tettnang, a small town in southern Baden-Württemberg in Germany. The region produces significant quantities of hops, and ships them to breweries throughout the world. Noble German dual-use hop used in European pale lagers, sometimes with Hallertau. Soft bitterness. (Alpha acid 3.5–5.5% / beta acid 3.5–5.5%)
- Žatec (Saaz): Noble hop, named after Žatec town, used extensively in Bohemia to flavour pale Czech lagers such as Pilsner Urquell. Soft aroma and bitterness. (Alpha acid 3–4.5% /Beta acid 3–4.5%)

Noble hops are characterized through analysis as having an aroma quality resulting from numerous factors in the essential oil, such as an alpha:beta ratio of 1:1, low alpha-acid levels (2–5%) with a low cohumulone content, low myrcene in the hop oil, high humulene in the oil, a ratio of humulene:caryophyllene above three, and poor storability resulting in them being more prone to oxidation. In reality, this means they have a relatively consistent bittering potential as they age, due to beta-acid oxidation, and a flavour that improves as they age during periods of poor storage.

== Other uses ==
2-methyl-3-buten-2-ol

Hops are used in herbal teas, as well as soft drinks including julmust (a carbonated beverage similar to soda that is popular in Sweden during December), Malta (a Latin American soft drink), kvass and hop water. A dietary supplement extracted from hops, amarasate is marketed to suppress appetite. Additionally, both the young shoots and young flowers are edible and can be cooked like asparagus.

Hops may be used in herbal medicine in a way similar to valerian, as a treatment for anxiety, restlessness, and insomnia. A pillow filled with hops is a popular folk remedy for sleeplessness. These indications have limited evidence in man. Hops lack strong evidence supporting effectiveness for any specific medical condition, though they are generally considered safe.

Hops are of interest for hormone replacement therapy and are under basic research for potential relief of menstruation-related problems.

== Toxicity ==
Dermatitis sometimes results from harvesting hops. Although few cases require medical treatment, an estimated 3% of the workers suffer some type of skin lesions on the face, hands, and legs. Hops are toxic to dogs.

== See also ==
- Mugwort, a herb historically used as a bitter in beer production
- Rhamnus prinoides, a plant whose leaves are used in the Ethiopian variety of mead called tej
