= Alpha acid =

Group of chemical compounds

Chemical structure of humulone, the most prevalent alpha acid in hops

Alpha acids (α acids) are a class of chemical compounds primarily of importance to the production of beer. They are found in the resin glands of the flowers of the hop plant and are the source of hop bitterness.

Alpha acids may be isomerized to form iso-alpha acids by the application of heat in solution. Iso-alpha acids (iso-α-acids) are typically produced in beer from the addition of hops to the boiling wort.

The degree of isomerization and the amount of bitter flavor produced by the addition of hops is highly dependent on the length of time the hops are boiled. Longer boil times will result in isomerization of more alpha acids and thus increased bitterness.

Common alpha acids include humulone, adhumulone, cohumulone, posthumulone, and prehumulone. The most common iso-α-acids are cis- and trans-isohumulone.

== Bittering ==
The alpha acid "rating" on hops indicates the amount of alpha acid as a percentage of total weight of the hop. Hops with a higher alpha acid content will contribute more bitterness than a lower alpha acid hop when using the same amount of hops. High alpha acid varieties of hops are more efficient for producing highly bitter beers.

Alpha acid percentages vary within specific varieties depending on growing conditions, drying methods, age of the hop, and other factors. For example, this list shows the typical range of alpha acids found in some common varieties (percentages are based on total dried weight).

Hop Variety	Alpha Acid Content
Saaz	2 - 5%
Hallertauer Hersbrucker	2.5 - 5%
Mt. Hood	3.5 - 8%
Willamette	4 - 7%
Styrian Goldings	4.5 - 7%
East Kent Goldings	4.5 - 7%
Cascade	4.5 - 8%
Centennial	9 - 11.5%
Chinook	12 - 14.0%

The choice of a hop variety used in beer brewing depends on the beer style. For instance, lager styles use hop varieties with a low alpha acid content (such as Saaz and Hallertauer) while IPA styles use hop varieties with a high alpha acid content (such as Cascade, Centennial and Chinook).

== Anti-bacterial properties ==
Iso-α-acids have a bacteriostatic effect on many common Gram-positive bacteria found in beer. While the iso-α-acids are very effective at preventing serious contamination from Gram-positive bacteria such as the lactic acid bacteria, there are some strains that are quite resistant to the effects of the iso-α-acids.

The iso-α-acids have no effect on Gram-negative bacteria, and therefore the brewer must rely on maintaining proper sanitization and anaerobic conditions of the finished beer to ensure shelf stability.
