= Lupulone =

- Lupulone chemical structure

Names
- IUPAC name 3,5-Dihydroxy-2,6,6-tris(3-methylbuten-2-yl)-4-(3-methyl-1-oxobutyl)cyclohexa-2,4-dien-1-one

Identifiers
CAS Number	468-28-0
3D model (JSmol)	Interactive image
Beilstein Reference	6983327
ChEBI	CHEBI:6574
ChEMBL	ChEMBL480267
ChemSpider	13433819
ECHA InfoCard	100.006.734
EC Number	207-405-3
KEGG	C10706
PubChem CID	68051
RTECS number	OK5950000
UNII	B7425USG94
CompTox Dashboard (EPA)	DTXSID00875553
- InChI: InChI=1S/C26H38O4/c1-16(2)9-10-20-23(28)22(21(27)15-19(7)8)25(30)26(24(20)29,13-11-17(3)4)14-12-18(5)6/h9,11-12,19,28,30H,10,13-15H2,1-8H3 Key: WPVSVIXDXMNGGN-UHFFFAOYSA-N
- SMILES: O=C1C(/C\C=C(/C)C)=C(/O)\C(=C(\O)C1(C\C=C(/C)C)C\C=C(/C)C)C(=O)CC(C)C

Properties
Chemical formula	C_{26}H_{38}O_{4}
Molar mass	414.586 g·mol^{−1}
Melting point	92–94 °C (198–201 °F; 365–367 K)
Boiling point	498 °C (928 °F; 771 K)
Solubility in water	Insoluble
Acidity (pK_{a})	4.20

Hazards
NFPA 704 (fire diamond)	1 2 0
Flash point	269°C
- Except where otherwise noted, data are given for materials in their standard state (at 25 °C [77 °F], 100 kPa). Infobox references

Lupulone is an organic chemical compound with the molecular formula C_{26}H_{38}O_{4} and an appearance of a yellow powder which was historically used in beer brewing.

== History ==
Since lupulone is found as a component of hops, the history of the compound can be traced back to 736 AD in southern Germany where hops plant were first cultivated. The commercial production of using lupulone in brewing was not until 1079 AD. The reason that lupulone was not utilized in beer brewing earlier on may be due to the fact that the hops plants has a bitter taste. However, brewers began to realize that beta acids of hops provided very little bitterness to the beer. Eventually, hops brewing with the use of lupulone made its way to the United States about 6 centuries later in 1629 after England introduced it.

== Synthesis ==
A synthesis pathway of lupulone involves the alkenylation of 2-acylcyclohexane-1, 3, 5-triones with bromides and liquid ammonia in ether as a base, which yields 4,6,6-trialkenyl derivatives (β-acids)

Lupulones are hops β-acids, which are one the main ingredients of hops resin. Hops are important for beer brewing because they provides the unique bitter taste, smell and foam stability of beer. More importantly, lupulones are a natural alternative to antibiotics for bioethanol production. The problem with lupulone is that it oxidizes easily, resulting in the loss of its antimicrobial activity. Lupulones are very reactive with 1-hydroxyethyl radicals, as shown by the free energy change for an electron-transfer reaction. 1-hydroxyethyl is a major radical species formed during beer brewing. The major products of this reaction were hydroxylated lupulone derivatives and 1-hydroxylethyl radicals. These results suggest that the prenyl side chains of hops β-acids are the reaction centers.

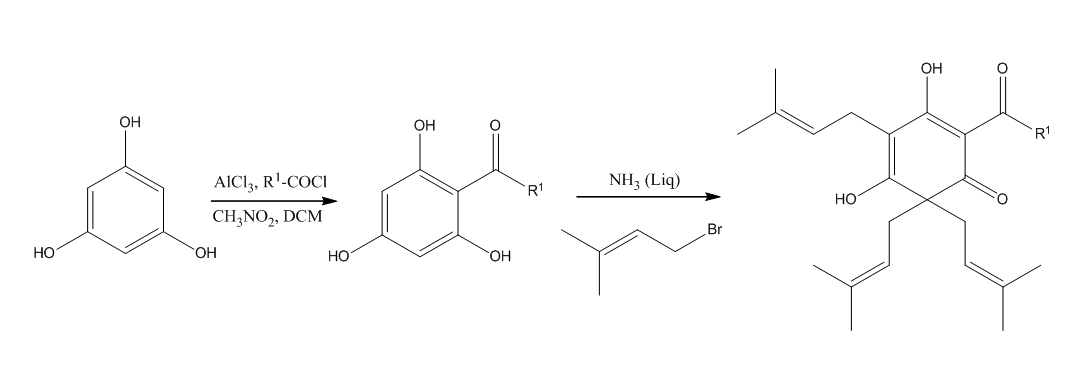

== Reactions ==
Lupolones are very reactive towards the 1-hydroxyethyl radical and are very oxidizable. Oxidation causes decomposition resulting in loss of the lupulone antimicrobial activity. The β-acid is less acidic and water soluble than the isomerized α-acids. The hop acids act as ionophores against Gram-positive bacteria, inhibiting their growth. This activity results from the hydrophobic interactions of prenyl groups present in a α- and β-acid structure with the bacterial cell walls.

== Applications ==
Derived from the cones of the female hop plant, lupulone is otherwise called a β-acid that contributes to the overall bitter flavor and aroma of beer along with α-acids. Both acids of the hops plant are added during the boiling of the wort. This boiling process causes the bitter α-acids to go through thermal isomerization to form the extremely bitter taste of iso-α-acids. The β-acids, in this case lupulone, are oxidized during the boiling process to create products that also influence the taste and aroma of the beer but not as to a great extent as the α-acids. The bitterness of a brew greatly depends on the concentration of the α and β-acids, the amount of hops used and the length of time spent boiling.

Lupulones have been used in products marketed for Varroa mite control in honeybees. The mechanism for control is not known, but lupulones may act as a repellent towards mites. Products with lupulines for beekeeping are considered non-toxic to humans and have low honeybee toxicity, but efficacy of those products for mite control is highly variable.

Lupulones in in-vitro studies of colon carcinoma cells can induce apoptosis by interacting with receptors for cell death. In the context of cancer cell growth, lupulone can slow blood vessel formation in animal models. In-vitro studies have also shown lupulone to repress the growth of bacteria that cause skin infection such as Propionibacterium acnes, Staphylococcus epidermidis and Staphylococcus aureus.
