= Humulone =

Names
- Preferred IUPAC name (6S)-3,5,6-Trihydroxy-2-(3-methylbutanoyl)-4,6-bis(3-methylbut-2-en-1-yl)cyclohexa-2,4-dien-1-one
- Other names α-Lupulic acid; α-Bitter acid

Identifiers
CAS Number	26472-41-3
3D model (JSmol)	Interactive image
ChemSpider	391214
ECHA InfoCard	100.043.371
PubChem CID	442911
UNII	KHB4767H3K
CompTox Dashboard (EPA)	DTXSID501019081 DTXSID50946227, DTXSID501019081
- InChI: InChI=1S/C21H30O5/c1-12(2)7-8-15-18(23)17(16(22)11-14(5)6)20(25)21(26,19(15)24)10-9-13(3)4/h7,9,14,23-24,26H,8,10-11H2,1-6H3/t21-/m1/s1
- SMILES: O=C(\C1=C(/O)\C(=C(\O)[C@](O)(C1=O)C\C=C(/C)C)C\C=C(/C)C)CC(C)C

Properties
Chemical formula	C_{21}H_{30}O_{5}
Molar mass	362.466 g·mol^{−1}
- Except where otherwise noted, data are given for materials in their standard state (at 25 °C [77 °F], 100 kPa). Infobox references

Humulone (α-lupulic acid), a vinylogous type of organic acid, is a bitter-tasting chemical compound found in the resin of mature hops (Humulus lupulus). Humulone is a prevalent member of the class of compounds known as alpha acids, which collectively give hopped beer its characteristic bitter flavor.

== Chemistry ==
In terms of structure, humulone is a phloroglucinol derivative with three isoprenoid side-chains. Two side-chains are prenyl groups and one is an isovaleryl group. The acidity of the ring enol moieties that give rise to its designation as an acid lie in their vinylogous relationship with the ring and side chain carbonyl functional groups.

== Isohumulone ==
During the brewing process, humulone degrades to cis- and trans-isohumulone. These “alpha acids” survive the boiling process, although numerous oxidized derivatives are produced. The iso-alpha acids are significantly more soluble than humulone at the pH levels typically present in the brewing process.

Degradation of humulone to cis- and trans-isohumulone

== Laboratory synthesis ==
Humulone can be synthesized by the acylation of benzene-1,2,3,5-tetrol with isovaleryl chloride to give 2,3,4,6-tetrahydroxyisovalerophenone. This step is followed by prenylation with 1-bromo-3-methyl-2-butene to give humulone.

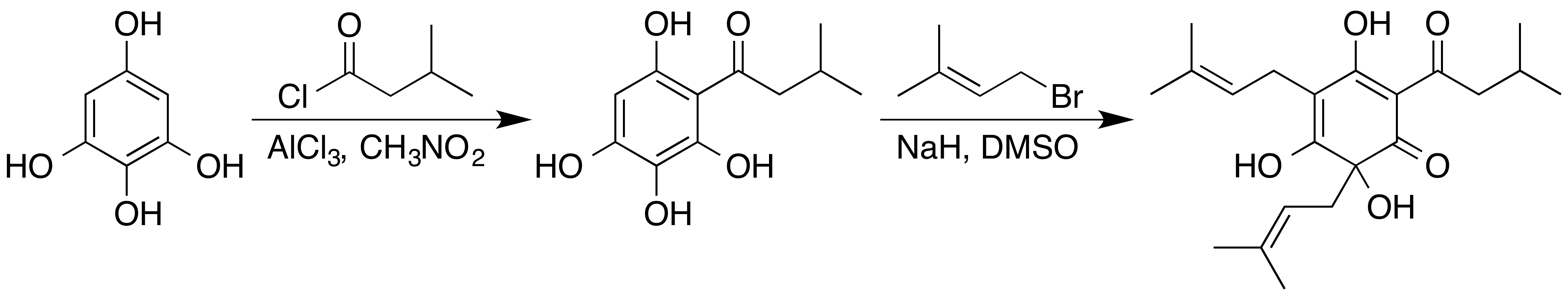
Synthesis of humulone from benzene-1,2,3,5-tetrol

== Biosynthesis ==
As determined by INADEQUATE 2D NMR, the biosynthesis of humulone in Humulus lupulus starts with an isovaleryl-CoA unit and 3 malonyl-CoA units catalyzed by phlorovalerophenone synthase. This conversion yields the benzenoid 3-methyl-1-(2,4,6-trihydroxyphenyl)butan-1-one. Dimethylallyl pyrophosphate is then obtained from the deoxyxylulose pathway, where prenylation of the benzenoid occurs, yielding humulone.

isovaleryl-CoA + 3 malonyl-CoA → 4 CoASH + 3 CO2 + 3-methyl-1-(2,4,6-trihydroxyphenyl)butan-1-one

3-methyl-1-(2,4,6-trihydroxyphenyl)butan-1-one + 2 DMAPP →C_{21}H_{30}O_{5}

== Research ==
Humulone is under basic research with in vitro studies to determine if it has biological properties, such as possible GABA_{A} receptor activity or antibacterial effects.
