= Beer in the United States =

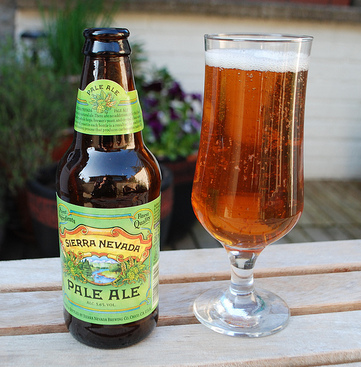
Modern American pale ale made by Sierra Nevada

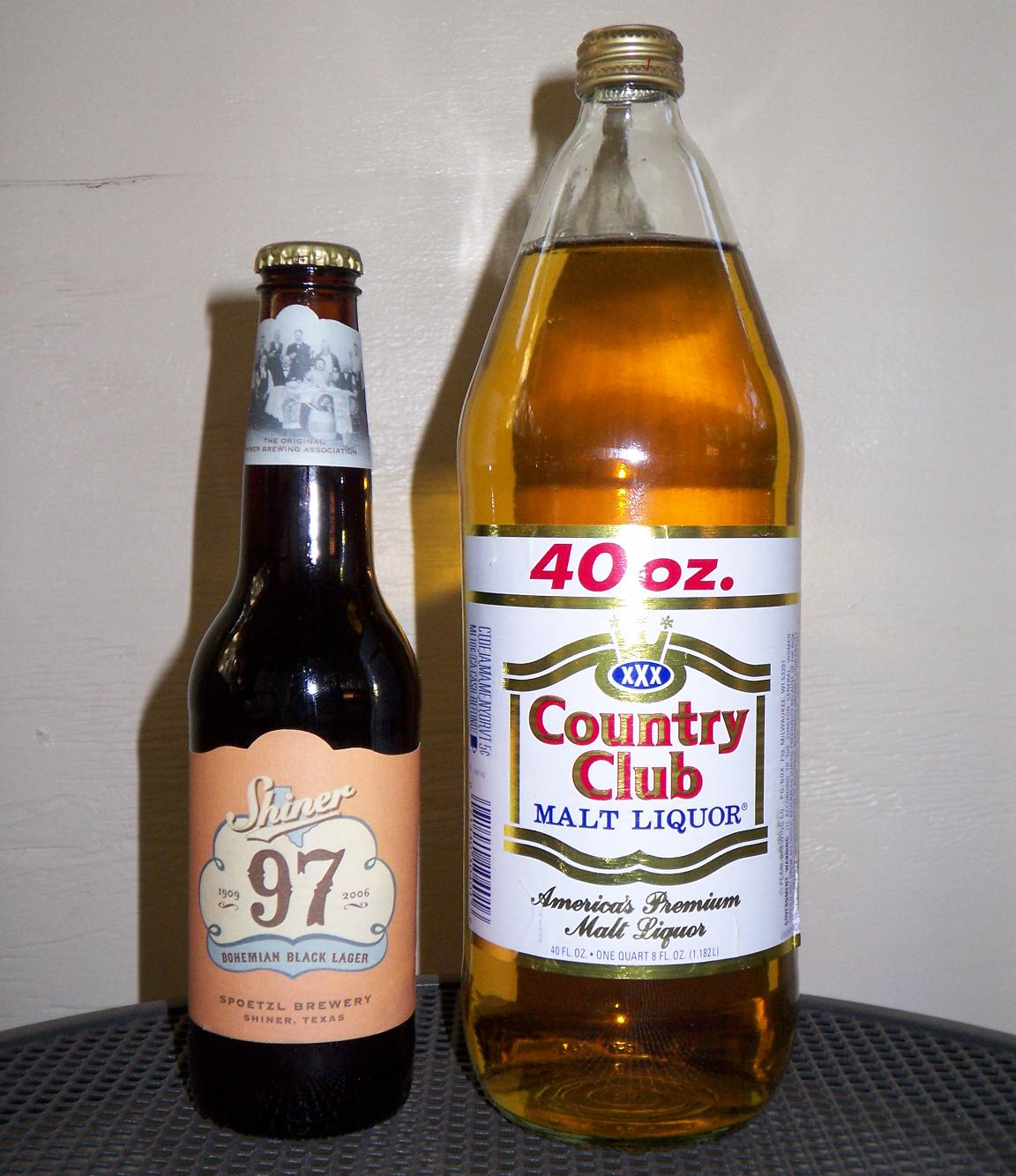
Bottles of a craft brewed black lager and a mass produced malt liquor

In the United States, beer is manufactured in breweries which range in size from industry giants to brew pubs and microbreweries. The United States produced 196 million barrels (23.0 GL) of beer in 2012, and consumes roughly 28 US gallons (110 L) of beer per capita annually. In 2011, the United States was ranked fifteenth in the world in per capita consumption, while total consumption was second only to China.

Although beer was a part of colonial life across the North American settlements, the passing of the Eighteenth Amendment in 1919 resulted in the prohibition of alcoholic beverage sales, forcing nearly all American breweries to close or switch to producing non-alcoholic products. After the repeal of Prohibition, the industry consolidated into a small number of large-scale breweries. Many of the big breweries that returned to producing beer after Prohibition, today largely owned by international conglomerates like Anheuser-Busch InBev, still retain their dominance of the market in the 21st century. However, the majority of the new breweries that have opened in the U.S. over the past three decades have been small breweries and brewpubs, referred to as "craft breweries" to differentiate them from the larger breweries.

The most common style of beer produced by the big breweries is pale lager. Beer styles indigenous in the United States include amber ale, cream ale, and California common. More recent craft styles include American Pale Ale, American IPA, India Pale Lager, Black IPA, and the American "Double" or "Imperial" IPA.

== History ==
=== Beginnings ===
The earliest record of brewing in the Americas dates from 1587, and the first commercial brewery in North America was built by the Dutch West India Company in 1632 in Lower Manhattan on Brewers (later Stone) Street. On February 5, 1663, Nicholas Varlett obtained from Peter Stuyvesant a patent for a brewery on Castle Point in Hoboken, New Jersey.

The brewing traditions of England and the Netherlands (as brought to New York) ensured that colonial drinking would be dominated by beer rather than wine. Until the middle of the 19th century, British-style ales dominated American brewing. This changed when the longer shelf-life lager styles brought by German immigrants turned out to be more profitable for large-scale manufacturing and shipping. The hops in lager had preservative qualities, while non-hopped local ales of the time quickly turned sour and were a perceived risk to drink.

The lager brewed by these companies was originally based on several different styles of Central Europe, but the Pilsener style, using mild Czech hops, pale, lightly roasted six-row barley and often adjuncts such as rice and corn, gradually won out.

Steam beer, the first uniquely American beer style, evolved in the San Francisco area during the 19th century. It was born out of the desire to produce lager beer without the use of refrigeration. After prohibition ended, the Anchor Brewing Company was left as the sole producer of steam beer. The company was near closure in 1965, whereupon Fritz Maytag, great-grandson of the Maytag Corporation founder, rescued the brewery and with it the steam beer style. Anchor has since trademarked the term "Steam Beer" and all subsequent renditions of the style are now termed California common.

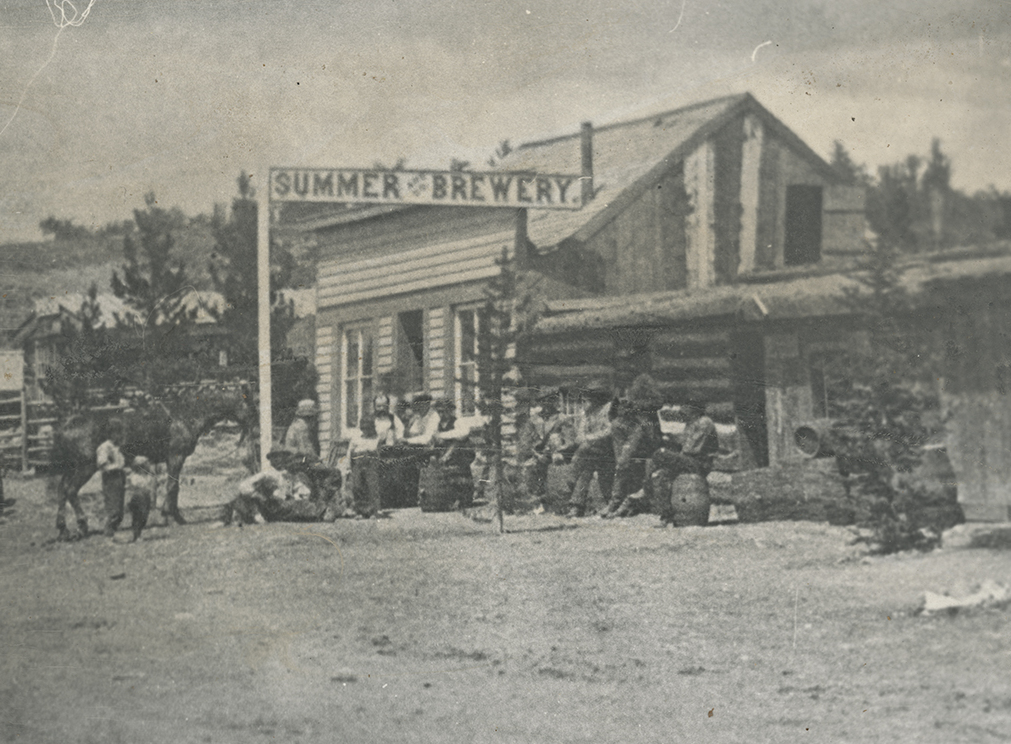
The Summer Brewery in Fairplay, Colorado 1800s

D.G. Yuengling & Son, commonly called Yuengling, is the oldest operating brewing company in the United States, having been established in 1829 by David Yuengling, and is one of the largest breweries by volume in the country. Headquartered in Pottsville, Pennsylvania, it is currently the largest American-owned brewery.

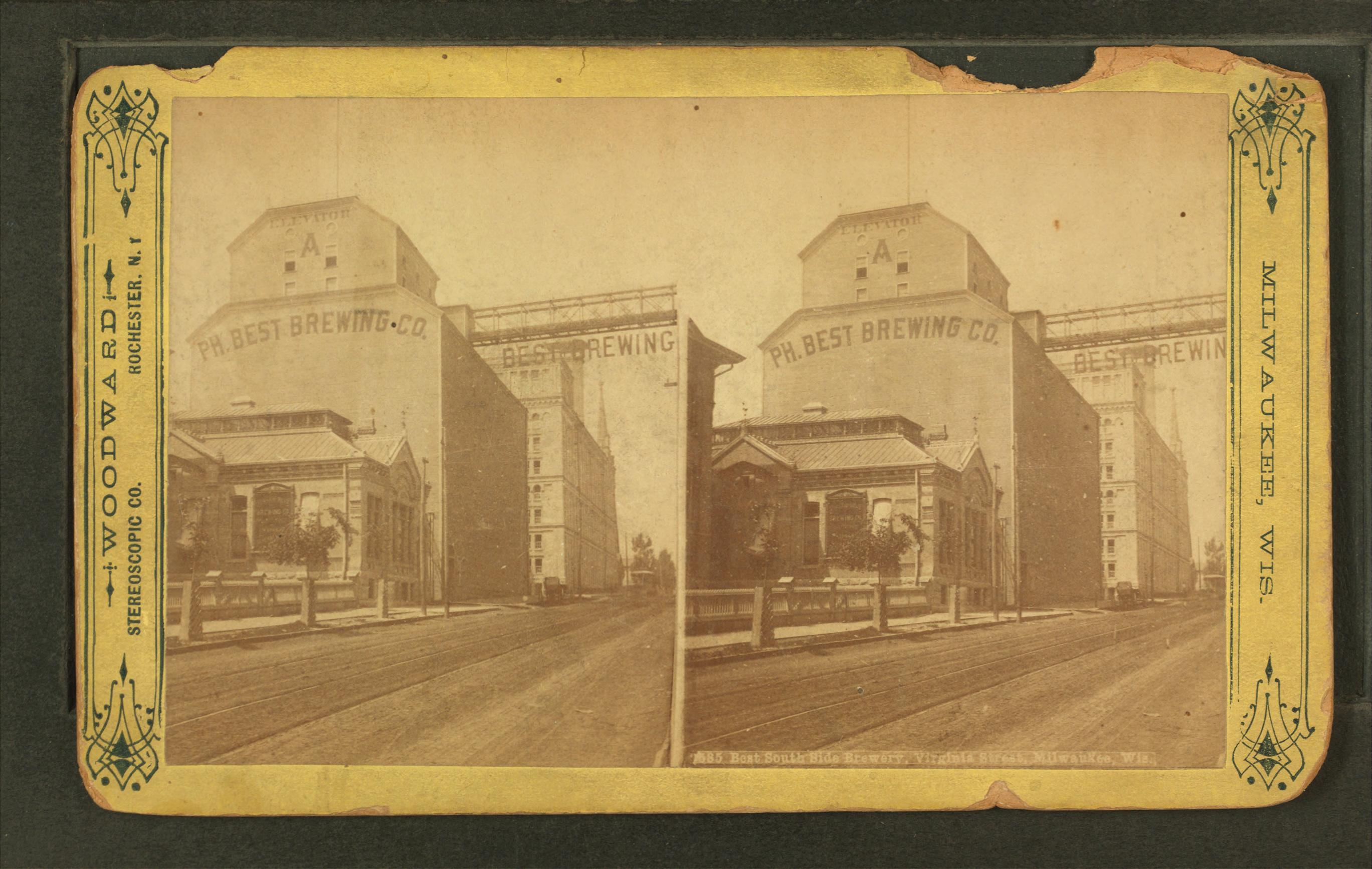
Best Brewing Co., Juneau Avenue, Milwaukee, Wisconsin, c. 1885

One of the earliest large-scale brewers was Best Brewing (later renamed Pabst Brewing Company), a Milwaukee brewery built by German immigrant Phillip Best in the 1840s. Other successful breweries of the era begun by German immigrants in Milwaukee included Valentin Blatz Brewing Company, Joseph Schlitz Brewing Company, and Miller Brewing Company.

Pabst began shipping its beer to Chicago and St. Louis the following decade, first by ferry and eventually by rail, establishing an early trans-market beer brand in the United States. Rail transportation of beer in refrigerated cars (originally ice-cooled) became common in the last decades of the 19th century, allowing brands like Pabst to undersell previously unchallenged local beers in distant cities, and establishing lager's dominance in the market since it could better withstand being shipped.

Missouri's Weston Brewing Company was first established in 1842 by German immigrant John Georgian. Georgian brought the tradition of lager brewing with him when he settled in Weston. The brewery was designed to utilize ice from the Missouri River during winter and lagering cellars dug deep into the ground to create ideal conditions for his beer which needed to be stored below 60 degrees for more than six weeks. In creating the brewery, the Weston Brewing Company became one of the first lager breweries in the United States.

In St. Louis, a prosperous German soap maker, Eberhard Anheuser, purchased a struggling brewery in 1860. His daughter married a brewery supplier, Adolphus Busch, who took over the company after his father-in-law's death, and renamed it Anheuser-Busch. Busch soon toured Europe, discovering the success of Bohemian lager, and introduced Budweiser beer (named after a beer brewed in the city of České Budějovice in Bohemia, known as Budweis in German) in 1876. Anheuser-Busch, and its Budweiser beer, later the largest brewery and beer brand in the world. The company innovated the use of refrigeration in rail cars to transport its beers, which helped make bottled Budweiser the first national beer brand in the United States.

A massive increase in immigration to the United States from Central and Eastern Europe led to an increase in beer consumption between 1880 and 1920 despite an overall decline in per capita alcohol consumption.

In 1912, the use of brown bottles began to be used by Joseph Schlitz Brewing Company of Milwaukee, Wisconsin. This innovation has since been accepted worldwide and prevents harmful rays from destroying the quality and stability of beer.

=== Prohibition ===
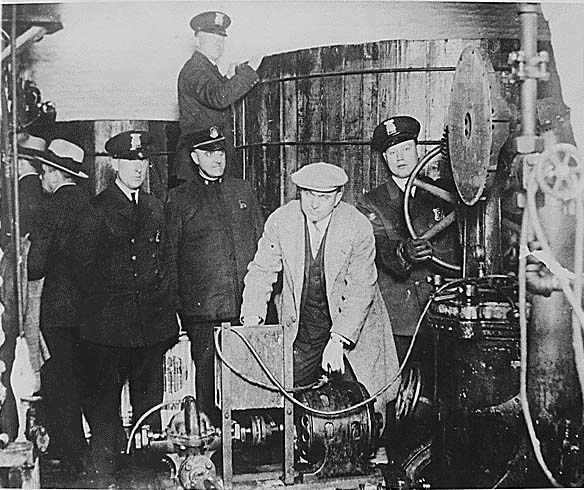
Detroit Police discover an underground brewery during Prohibition.

On January 16, 1919, the Eighteenth Amendment to the United States Constitution was enacted into law, inaugurating the Prohibition era, wherein the production, sale and transportation of alcoholic beverages was made illegal. All legal American brewing came to a halt when prohibition was imposed, though the earlier temperance movement had already reduced the number of breweries significantly. Only a few breweries, mainly the largest, were able to stay in business by manufacturing near beer, malt syrup, or other non-alcohol grain products, in addition to soft drinks such as colas and root beers. Production and shipping of alcohol was largely confined to illegal operations that could deliver compact distilled beverages—smuggled rum and domestic moonshine—more efficiently and reliably than bulkier products such as beer.

American prohibition was repealed by degrees. First, the Volstead Act defining "intoxicating liquors", was amended in April 1933 by the Cullen–Harrison Act to provide that beer with a strength of up to 3.2% alcohol was not "intoxicating", and thus not prohibited (The "3.2 %" referred to is a measurement by weight and would be roughly equivalent to 4% if measured by volume, as is now common). Within 24 hours of legalization, as much as 1.5 million barrels of 3.2% ABW beer was sold, causing some to predict a "beer famine". Soon thereafter, in December of the same year, the Twenty-first Amendment to the United States Constitution repealed prohibition in general, but left the production of alcoholic beverages heavily regulated by federal, state, and local authorities. Included in these regulations was the imposition of a three-tier distribution system, in which a manufacturer of alcoholic beverages must go through a wholesale distributor to sell its product, rather than selling to retailers directly.

=== Post Prohibition ===
Although the Twenty-first Amendment allowed brewers to legally resume practicing their craft, many "dry" counties remained and many states failed to ratify altogether, which slowed the resurgence of the brewing industry. In addition, the many prohibitionists of the temperance movement were still quite vocal and were able to retain a large following despite the repealing of the eighteenth amendment. Before the American beer industry could attempt to re-establish itself, World War II began. This further inhibited the re-emergence of smaller breweries because much of the grain supply was rationed due to the war, forcing the breweries to use adjuncts such as corn and rice alongside the barley traditionally used in brewing. The prohibitionists saw a tantalizing opportunity to quell the efforts of the remaining breweries, insisting that the commercial brewing of beer squandered manpower, grain, fuel, and cargo space that should have gone towards the war effort overseas. Brewers responded to these accusations by extolling the benefits that brewer's yeast have on human health, namely their high vitamin B content. It was argued that the increase in thiamine in the diets of the soldiers and factory workers would improve performance on the battlefield as well as in the factory and that this increase sufficiently justified the need for beer. The American government decided that the benefits of the vitamin B in brewer's yeast, alongside the taxes coming in from beer sales, were enough to justify a request for fifteen percent of beer production for servicemen.

Although America's breweries had the backing of their government, they still needed to capture the hearts and the wallets of the American people. In order to accomplish this, the major breweries banded together and launched the "Morale is a Lot of Little Things" advertising campaign. The campaign can be well summarized from the following 1942 magazine advertisement:

"If you’re a man, it’s a shine on your shoes ... the sweet feel of a fly rod in your hand ... If you’re a woman, it’s a tricky new hair-do maybe ... or a change of lipstick. Morale is a lot of little things like that. People can take the big bad things ... the bitter news, the bombings even ... if only a few of the little, familiar, comforting good things are left."

From the time America entered the war in 1941 until it ended in 1945, the overall production of beer increased by over 40% despite the small number of active breweries. This wartime growth allowed the large breweries such as Anheuser-Busch to dominate the American market for over fifty years. During this period they produced beers more noted for their uniformity than for any particular flavor. Beers such as those made by Anheuser-Busch and Coors Brewing Company followed a restricted pilsner style, with large-scale industrial processes and the use of low-cost ingredients like corn or ingredients such as rice that provided starch for alcohol production while contributing minimal flavor to the finished product. The dominance of the so-called "macrobrew" led to an international stereotype of "American beer" as poor in quality and flavor.

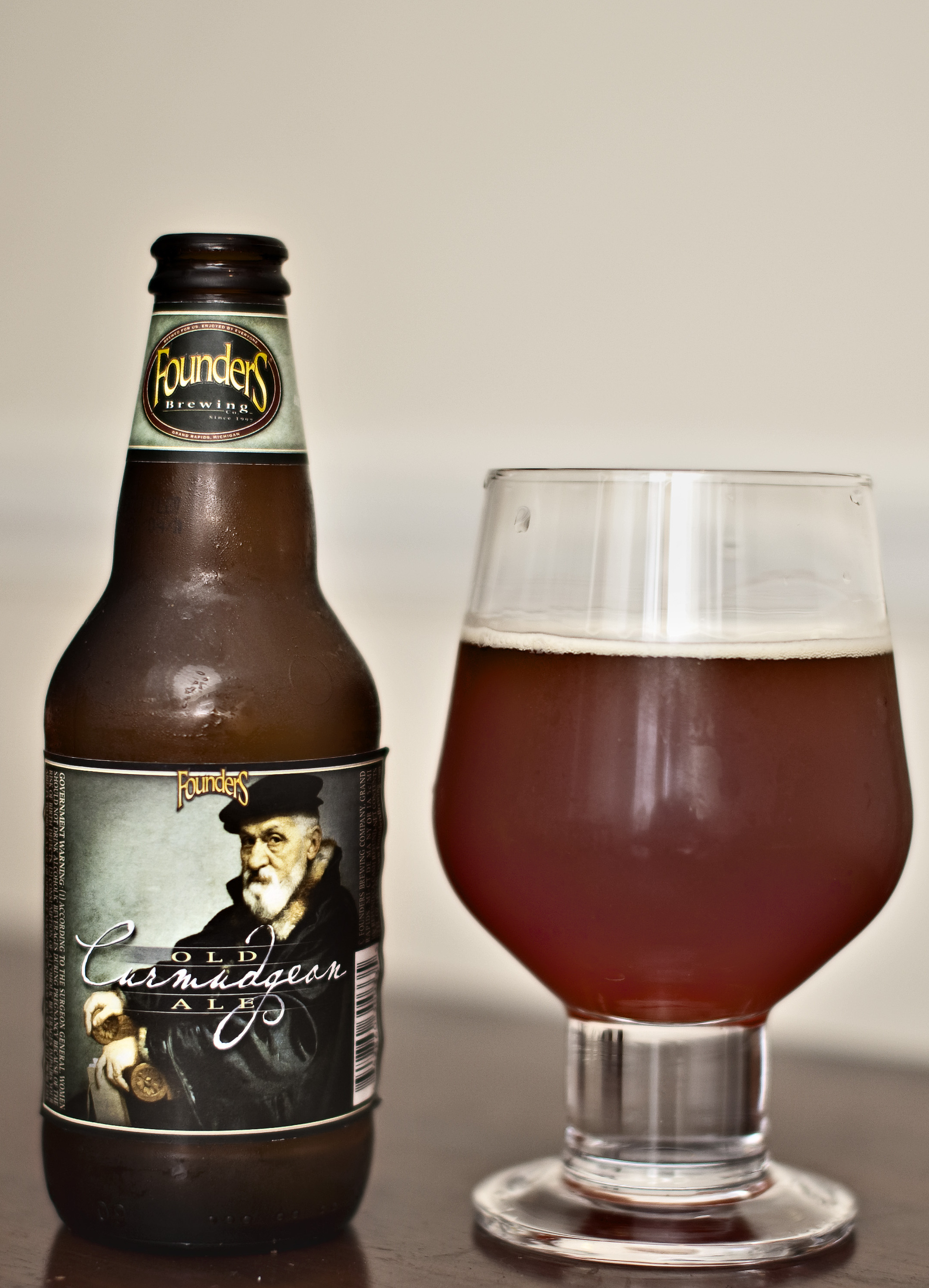
Goblet of Founders Curmudgeon Old Ale, an American craft beer

=== Emergence of small breweries ===
By the 1970s, consolidation and dominance by the country's major brewers led to the fewest breweries in the country's modern history. Despite this, the period also saw the beginnings of the country's current craft beer movement. In 1976, optical engineer and homebrewer Jack McAuliffe founded New Albion Brewing Company in Sonoma County, California, becoming the nation's first microbrewery since Prohibition. Influenced by Fritz Maytag's recent turnaround of the Anchor Brewing Company and an earlier military stationing in Scotland, McAuliffe's brewery offered bottle-conditioned porter, stout, and pale ale to a public more accustomed to lightly flavored lagers. Despite only staying in business for seven years, New Albion ignited an interest in craft beer and set a precedent for a generation of craft brewers, including Ken Grossman and the owners of Mendocino Brewing Company, the nation's first brewpub.

On October 14, 1978, H.R. 1337 was signed into law, which legalized the homebrewing, home production of a small amount of beer or wine for personal consumption. Since then, the United States has witnessed a resurgence of brewing culture and the widespread proliferation of small breweries. By March 1986, five brewpubs had opened in the United States. The total number of breweries rose from 42 in 1978 to over 2,750 in 2012, reaching or exceeding the number of breweries estimated to have existed during the colonial period. Virtually all of this growth is attributable to small, independent breweries.

== Economy ==
For most years since 1992, beer was the most popular alcoholic beverage in America. At times, it was essentially tied with wine, but over time its overall popularity has declined, and as of 2022 spirits surpassed beer in popularity. As of 2016, the top three beer companies in the US were Anheuser-Busch, MillerCoors, and Pabst Brewing Company. As of 2009, the top beer brands by market share were Bud Light (28.3%), Budweiser (11.9%) and Coors Light (9.9%). Corona Extra is the No. 1 imported beer, followed by Heineken. 2009 figures show an overall decline in beer consumption from previous years, with only craft beer sales rising at a rate of 7–10%. Overall U.S. beer consumption was calculated at 205.8 million barrels. Light beer constitutes a 52.8% share of US beer sales.

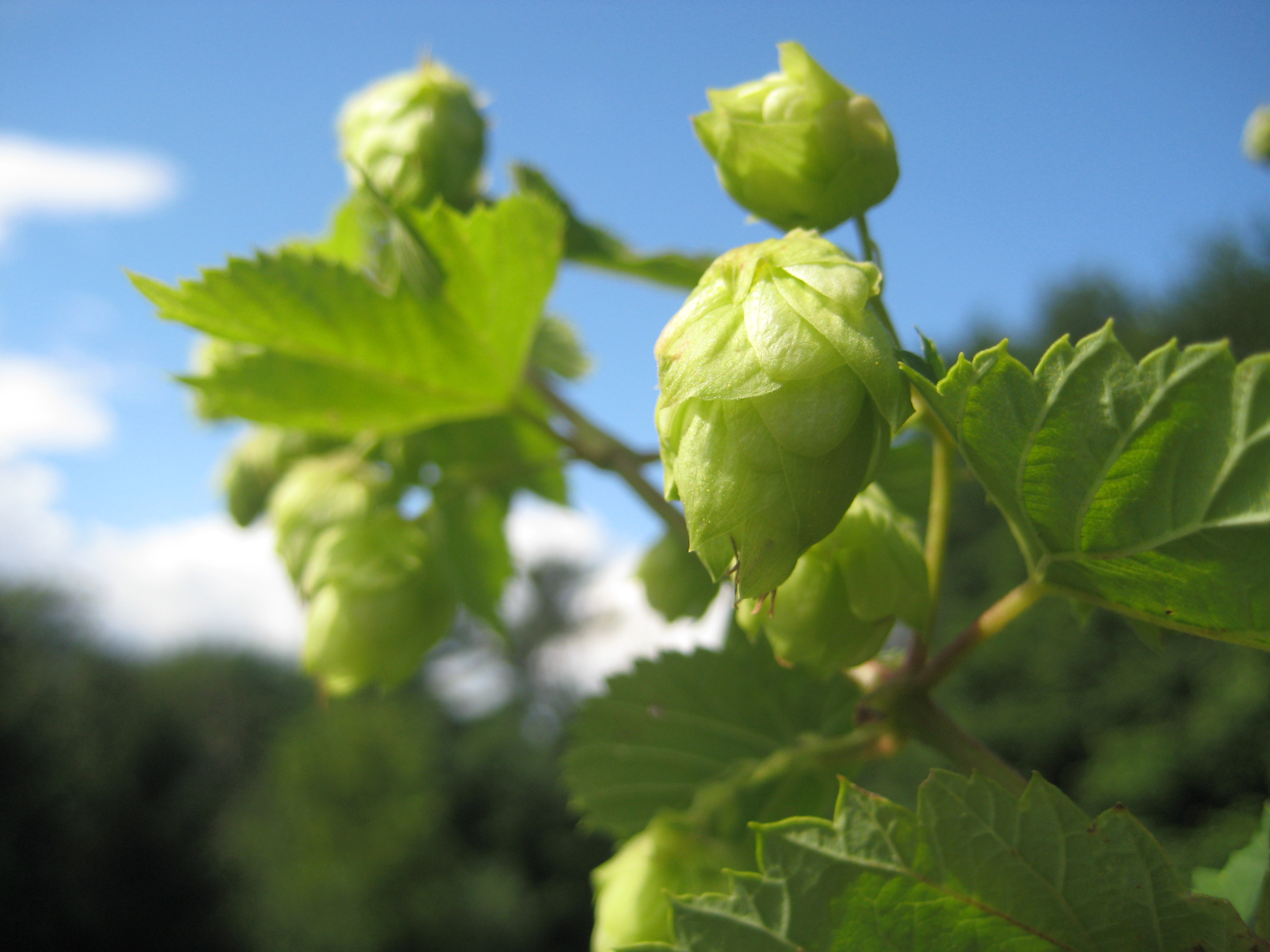
Cascade hop cone, an American hop varietal

Nearly eighty percent of convenience stores sell beer, about 93 percent of which is sold cold. The U.S. convenience store industry sells more than 2 billion US gallons (7,600,000 m^{3}) of beer a year; roughly one-third of all the beer purchased in the United States. Of the twenty percent of convenience stores that do not sell beer, the majority of those are in Pennsylvania—the nation's sixth-largest state by population—due to limitations on alcohol sales in the state, which make it illegal to sell in convenience stores and restrict sales inside supermarkets. Legislation is currently pending in the Pennsylvania General Assembly to legalize alcohol sales in convenience stores and loosen restrictions on supermarkets.

In 2007, U.S. consumption was 6.7 billion US gallons (25,000,000 m^{3}). Beer sales in the premium market are increasing, while sales in the standard and economy section are decreasing. The major beer producers merged to strengthen their position – Anheuser-Busch merged with InBev to form Anheuser-Busch InBev, and Molson Coors formed a joint venture with Miller Brewing Company to form MillerCoors. Despite legal challenges, the country's three-tiered distribution system remains in place.

== Craft beer ==
US breweries per million people by state as of 2013

Today, there are over 4,000 craft breweries in the United States and the craft beer industry employs over 100,000 individuals brewing 15.6 million barrels of beer per year. According to an article by the Associated Press, published in 2016, craft beer is a $22 billion industry in the United States and sales were up 13% year over year.

The Brewers Association, a trade group of American brewers, defines a brewery as "craft" if it: 1. is largely independent of outside corporate ownership, 2. produces fewer than six million barrels per year, and 3. uses traditional ingredients such as malted barley, or innovative ingredients to enhance flavor.

According to the Brewers Association, the five largest craft breweries in order of sales volume for 2021 were:

1. D. G. Yuengling & Son of Pottsville, Pennsylvania (Philadelphia),
2. Boston Beer Company of Boston, Massachusetts (which produces Samuel Adams beers),
3. Sierra Nevada Brewing Company of Chico, California,
4. Duvel Moortgat USA of Paso Robles, California, Kansas City, Missouri, and Cooperstown, New York
5. Gambrinus Company of San Antonio, Texas (which owns the Shiner, Texas-based Spoetzl Brewery and produces Shiner Beer).

The relative success of the commercial craft brewing industry has led some beverage giants such as AB Inbev to invest in smaller breweries such as Widmer Brothers and Goose Island, and to develop more complex beers of their own. Despite growth of the craft and microbrewing industry, however, craft beer still only accounts for 11% of total beer sales by volume in the United States, although that number is expected to rise in coming decades.

While the rise of craft beer in the United States has not been defined by any single geographic area, regions of the country associated with a strong craft brewing culture include the Midwest, Mountain West, and the Pacific Northwest, where the majority of American hop varietals are grown. Overall, the West Coast has the most craft breweries and the Deep South has the fewest. Portland, Oregon is currently home to 58 breweries, more than any other city in the world. Vermont, Montana, Oregon, Alaska and Colorado have the highest number of breweries per million inhabitants in the nation. California, Pennsylvania, Colorado, Ohio and Oregon have the highest total craft output, respectively. Until recently, legal restrictions have prevented craft breweries from flourishing in the South, such as limitations on the alcohol content of beer and the questionable legal status of homebrewing in many Southern states. In recent years, however, Mississippi has raised the limit on the alcohol content of beer from 5% to 10% ABV and has fully legalized homebrewing.

Craft beer has a non-alcoholic category rising in popularity with breweries like Surreal Brewing Company in California solely dedicated to creating non-alcoholic beer.

== Beer styles ==
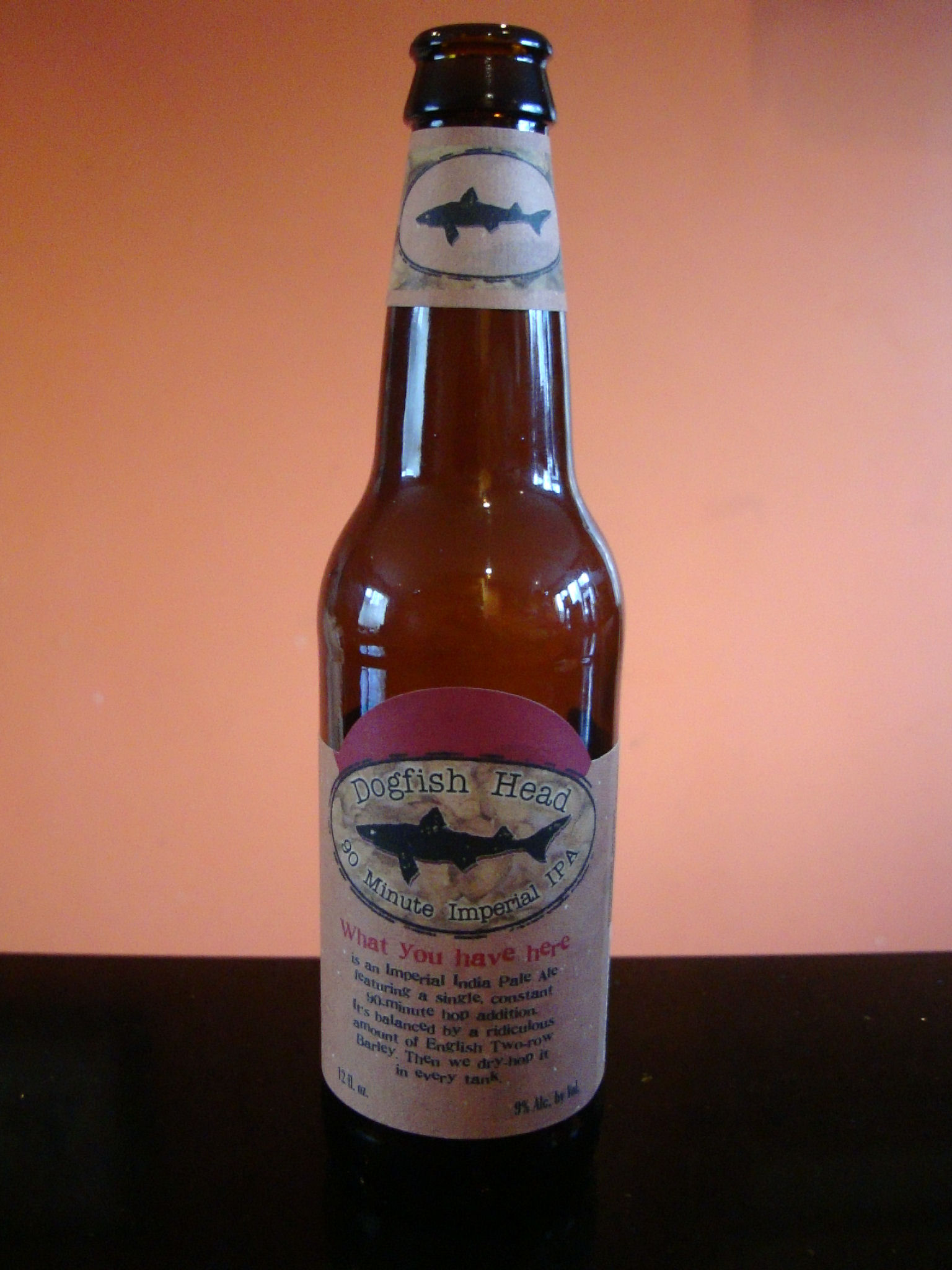
Dogfish Head 90 Minute IPA, an example of an American Double IPA

=== Pre-Prohibition styles ===
Historical beer styles indigenous to the United States include California common beer or "steam beer", Kentucky Common Beer, amber ale, blonde ale and cream ale.

=== Contemporary craft styles ===
Numerous beer styles have emerged in the United States since the beginnings of the craft beer movement in the 1970s, ranging from variations on traditional European styles to much more experimental ales and lagers. American craft beers frequently employ newer American hop varietals such as Cascade, Citra, Simcoe, Willamette, or Warrior. These hops, developed by private growers and universities since the 1970s, contribute to the distinctiveness of many American craft beers but are especially important to the flavor of American Pale Ale (APA) and American India Pale Ale. These beers can deviate considerably from the traditional English styles they were adapted from and are often robustly bitter, resinous, or fruity.

In the Pacific NorthWest in Bend, Oregon, the PNWIPA was first introduced by Deschutes Brewery in 2004. The American "double" or "imperial" IPA, a popular style credited to Russian River Brewing Company brewmaster Vinny Cilurzo, can be extremely hoppy and strong, ranging from 7–14% ABV with bitterness ratings routinely topping 90 IBUs. Similarly, American stout beer, inspired by Russian Imperial Stout, may be hoppy and high in ABV, such as Deschutes Abyss or Goose Island's Bourbon County Stout, which is fermented to 15% ABV and conditioned in bourbon barrels. An emerging style associated with the Pacific Northwest is Cascadian Dark Ale, alternatively known as Black IPA, a heavily hopped beer with dark, roasted malts. Other adapted styles with distinct American variations include Irish red ale, brown ale, Scotch ale, wheat beer, rye beer and barleywine. Some breweries, such as Off Color Brewing in Chicago, focus on resurrecting styles that have been essentially extinct since the advent of Reinheitsgebot in Germany.

Belgian beer styles have also been adapted by American breweries, including saison, dubbel, tripel, and Belgian strong ale. The lighter of these (saison, golden strong ale and tripel) beers have soft malt flavors and mild to strong "spicy" characteristics that come from yeast or the addition of spices. The darker of these beers (dubbel and dark strong ale) may have flavors of dried fruit that derives from the malts, yeast and sugar used to make them. All of these beers are high in carbonation and low in hop character. Witbier, a style nearly extinct until reintroduced by Belgian brewer Pierre Celis in the 1960s, is one of the top-selling craft beer styles in the United States. Brewery Ommegang, Jolly Pumpkin, and The Bruery are other examples of breweries that produce Belgian-inspired beers. In 2014, Spencer Brewery, opened by the monks of St. Joseph's Abbey in Spencer, Massachusetts, became the first certified Trappist brewery outside of Europe.

=== Pale lager and malt liquor ===
While craft brewing companies with myriad style offerings continue to gain market share, the best-selling style of beer made in the U.S. is still pale lager, most often made by most large-scale brewers, including Anheuser-Busch InBev and MillerCoors. These large-scale brewers also produce other popular styles, often relatively light in body, flavor and calories. Light beer, which was introduced on a large scale by Miller Brewing Company in the early 1970s, is a beer made with reduced alcohol and carbohydrate content, and has grown to eclipse many of the original pale lager brands in sales. Bud Light, brewed by Anheuser-Busch InBev, was the top-selling beer in the United States. Ice beer is an example which has been partially freeze-distilled with the intention of concentrating flavor and alcohol. The technique is based on that used to make Eisbock, but the two styles share no stylistic similarities (apart from both being lagers) otherwise. Dry beer, a Japanese style based on pale lager, is also brewed by some American companies. In dry beer, the yeast is encouraged to consume more fermentables, resulting in a crisper finish and an unusually subtle hop flavor.

Malt liquor is a high-ABV pale lager. It has often incited controversy due to its alcohol content, larger-sized containers, low prices, and advertising that frequently targets inner city neighborhoods.

== Distribution ==
Beer distribution in America is divided into manufacturers, wholesalers, and retailers. The middle man in this arrangement is a requirement of the laws in most states in order for more efficient taxation and regulation of the industry. Before Prohibition, beer was sold to the American people almost exclusively through saloons. Patrons either drank their beverage in the bar or in some cases used "growlers" (large tin pails) to bring beer home from the saloon. The vast majority of saloons in America at this time were owned or controlled by breweries. After the end of Prohibition in 1933, states passed laws regulating the sale of alcohol, inserting an intermediary between the brewer and retailer that did not exist before, known as the distributor, supplier, or wholesaler. Breweries produce the beer, distributors transport and sell it to retailers, and retailers sell it to the public. To ensure that the incentives that resulted in over-serving and corruption before Prohibition did not exist, states adopted provisions to ensure independence of manufacturing, wholesaling, and retailing in the beer industry. Delaware's Code of law states that "It shall be unlawful for a manufacturer or supplier…to own or be interested in any manner in any establishment licensed by the Commissioner to sell alcoholic liquors". This system gives the states more control over alcohol sales than before because now market participants at each of the three steps need state license to do business.

Under the three-tier system taxes could be levied at three levels of the beer distribution process. Breweries pay a federal excise tax. Distributors are taxed by the states (usually on a per volume basis), and then retailers have to pay a sales tax. While this adds much to the price of beer, it was believed higher beer prices would lead to temperance. Small breweries like this system because it ensures that large breweries cannot control the distributors and block them from the market. Tax rates vary from state to state; Tennessee taxes wholesalers on volume ($4.21 per barrel) and on sales (17% of the wholesale selling price). A Standard and Poor analysis estimated that all the taxes levied during the manufacture, distribution, and retailing of beer adds up to 44% of the retail price.

Another issue is the deterioration of independence between the breweries and distributors. Most distributors even label themselves as "Anheuser-Busch" or "MillerCoors" distributors, and recently Anheuser-Busch InBev has strengthened incentives in its exclusivity program. While they lack the same degree of control as Pre-Prohibition times, manufacturers can still have substantial influence over what beers make it to shelves. In fact, one of the reasons InBev recently bought Anheuser-Busch was to gain access to its distribution channels. This lack of independence is especially threatening to small breweries, who claim that wholesaler independence is critical to making sure the success or failure of beer depends on consumer demand, not barriers to distribution. They would also like to see the ban lifted on contracts between brewers and wholesales, especially when they feel that incentive programs from the larger manufacturers have been getting around this ban for years.

Those pushing for a more open system of beer distribution often point to recent changes in the laws concerning wine sales. All but 11 states now allow wineries to ship directly to the consumer, cutting out the wholesale middle man. The reasoning behind these laws is that because of high shipping costs, only enthusiasts looking for high end, expensive wines are taking advantage of this method, eliminating the need for temperance-inducing increased costs. Proposals to open up laws in the remaining 11 states are opposed by distributors and retailers who claim it would hurt small business, but supported by small breweries who hope the changes may spread to the beer industry as well.

== See also ==
- List of breweries in the United States
- List of defunct breweries in the United States
- National Beer Day (United States)
