= American pale ale =

Style of pale ale developed in the United States around 1980

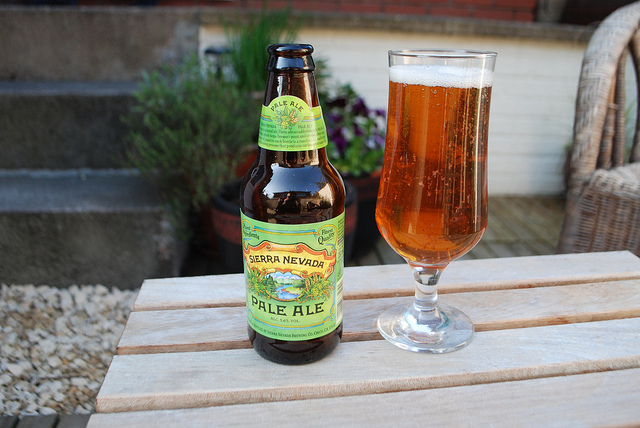
- Sierra Nevada Pale Ale, prototypical APA
- Country of origin: United States
- Yeast type: Top-fermenting
- Alcohol by volume: 4.5–6.2%
- Color (SRM): 5–14
- Bitterness (IBU): 30–45
- Original gravity: 1.045–1.060
- Final gravity: 1.010–1.015
- Malt percentage: usually 100%

American pale ale (APA) is a style of pale ale developed in the United States around 1980.

American pale ales are generally around 5% abv with significant quantities of American hops, typically Cascade. Although American brewed beers tend to use a cleaner yeast, and American two row malt, it is particularly the American hops that distinguish an APA from British or European pale ales. The style is close to the American India Pale Ale (IPA), and boundaries blur, though IPAs are stronger and more assertively hopped. The style is also close to amber ale, though ambers are darker and maltier due to use of crystal malts.

== History ==
Anchor Liberty Ale, a 6% abv ale originally brewed by Anchor Brewing Company as a special in 1975 to commemorate Paul Revere's midnight ride in 1775 which marked the start of the American War of Independence, was seen by Michael Jackson as the first modern American ale. Fritz Maytag, the owner of Anchor, visited British breweries in London, Yorkshire and Burton upon Trent, picking up information about robust pale ales, which he used when he made his American version using just malt rather than the malt and sugar combination common in brewing at that time, and making prominent use of the American hop, Cascade. The beer was popular, and became a regular in 1983.

Jack McAuliffe of the New Albion Brewing Company was brewing his New Albion Ale by 1976, inspired by the ales he had tasted in Scotland. The beer was (at the time) vigorously hopped with American Cascade hops, refermented in the bottle, and not straw in color – all qualities the popular beer style of the time, i.e. pale lagers, did not possess. While the company brewed for fewer than 6 years at only 7.5 barrels (217 US gallons) per week, it inspired many more pioneers and imitators.

The first brewery to successfully commercialize the use of significant quantities of American hops in the style of APA was the Sierra Nevada Brewing Company, which brewed the first experimental batch of Sierra Nevada Pale Ale in November 1980, distributing the finished version in March 1981. Another pioneer of the hoppy American pale ale was Bert Grant of Yakima Brewing.
