= Food Unwrapped (book) =

2014 book by Daniel Tapper

Food Unwrapped: Lifting the Lid on How Our Food Is Really Produced
- First edition
- Author: Daniel Tapper
- Language: English
- Subject: Food/Food technology
- Publisher: Transworld, Bantam
- Publication date: April 17, 2014
- Pages: 304
- ISBN: 9780593073612

Food Unwrapped is a 2014 book about the food industry by the British writer Daniel Tapper. It is based on a BBC Channel 4 television series of the same name, and covers food science and food technology in mass-produced foods with the objective of "dispel[ing] food myths and reveal[ing] some truths about the food we buy". Subjects covered in the book include the relative merits of sea salt versus table salt; and the harm or lack of harm in artificial food colorings and flavorings.

The book's author has also been a contributor to The Guardian and Waitrose Kitchen. In 2013, using knowledge he acquired as a self-taught homebrewer, Tapper opened a brewery producing American pale ale style beer (using American Cascade hops).
