= Mendocino Brewing Company =

Brewery in Ukiah, Mendocino County, California

Coordinates: 39°7′33.74″N 123°12′1.9″W

- Location: Ukiah, California, US
- Opened: 1983
- Closed: 2018
- Owned by: Vijay Mallya, UB Group

Active beers
Name	Type
Red Tail Ale	Amber Ale
Blue Heron Pale Ale	Pale Ale
Black Hawk Stout	Stout

Seasonal beers
Name	Type
Eye of the Hawk	Strong Pale Ale

Mendocino Brewing Company (OTCQB: MENB) is a brewery founded in 1983 as the Hopland Brewery in the Mendocino County town of Hopland, California. The brewery expanded and moved its operations to a larger Mendocino County facility located in Ukiah, California in 1997.

== Background ==
The Hopland Brewery was founded in 1983 by homebrewers Michael Laybourn and Norman Franks who purchased the brewing equipment of the closed New Albion Brewing Company. Former New Albion brewers, Jack McAuliffe and Don Barkley, were hired to operate the brewery. The flagship beer was named Red Tail Ale, named after both the beer's color and also a local hymn titled "The Redtail Hawk", written by Kate Wolf. The company continued to name all its beer varieties after birds.

Opened on August 14, 1983, the Hopland Brewery was the first California brewpub ‒ a brewery licensed to sell both its own beer and food at the same location ‒ as well as the second in the United States.

In 2014, Northwest Labor Press listed Mendocino Brewing as the only unionized craft brewery they could find. The Ukiah facility was represented by the Teamsters.

Mendocino Brewing Company ceased operations in January 2018. In March 2019, investors and several former employees announced that they had re-started operations and brewed Red Tail Ale and Eye of the Hawk for limited, local distribution.

== Public offering ==
In 1994, the company went public in a direct public offering, advertising its share offering with flyers in six-packs of its beer. In 1997, Vijay Mallya, owner of the UB Group, bought a significant portion of the company, and was the beneficial owner of approximately three-quarters of the company's stock.

== Beers ==
The company's beers included Red Tail Ale, Blue Heron Pale Ale, Black Hawk Stout, and Peregrine Pilsner, as well as several other regular offerings, and various short-run seasonal offerings, such as Eye of the Hawk Strong Pale Ale. Their products were named for birds of prey, except Blue Heron, and feature images of the birds on their labels. When they first opened, they only offered only beer by the glass and food. A few months after opening they began selling bottled beer. The bottles were champagne magnums, and staff sold them in groups of six, calling it "the world's largest six pack".

As part of the acquisition by UB Group, the company owned Olde Saratoga Brewing Company in Saratoga Springs, New York, and produces Kingfisher brand beers for the U.S. market.

== Sponsorship ==
The brewery was also the official sponsor of the Mendocino Steam Donkeys Rugby Football Club, a local men's Division III rugby union team.

== See also ==
- California breweries
