= New Albion Brewing Company =

Sonoma defunct brewery

- Company type: Private
- Industry: Alcoholic beverage
- Founded: October 1976
- Founder: Jack McAuliffe, Suzy Stern, Jane Zimmerman
- Defunct: 1982
- Fate: Revived
- Headquarters: Sonoma, California, United States
- Area served: Northern California
- Products: Beer
- Production output: 450 US barrels/year (1980)

The New Albion Brewing Company is known as the first American craft beer brewery. Founded in 1976 by Jack McAuliffe, Suzy Stern, and Jane Zimmerman in Sonoma, California, New Albion is acknowledged as the first United States microbrewery of the modern era, as well as a heavy influence on the subsequent microbrewery and craft beer movements of the late 20th century. New Albion was resurrected in 2012 by Boston Beer Company under the supervision of McAuliffe. The current president is McAuliffe's daughter, Renee M. DeLuca.

== History ==
McAuliffe began as a homebrewer, influenced by the beer he sampled while stationed by the U.S. Navy in Scotland, as well that of Fritz Maytag's Anchor Brewing Company in nearby San Francisco upon his return. After graduating college in 1971, McAuliffe worked as an optical engineer in the Silicon Valley, but spent his free time studying the necessities to build his own brewery. Upon presenting his idea to professor Michael Lewis of the University of California at Davis, who would also go on to advise Ken Grossman in the beginning stages of his Sierra Nevada Brewing Company, McAuliffe utilized the Davis library to build a plan for his brewery.

Initial plans to build the brewery in San Francisco and name it the Barbary Coast Brewing Company were thwarted by expensive real estate and a lack of investors. By 1975, McAuliffe quit his job and moved north to Sonoma, a decision influenced by cheaper expenses and a local food and wine scene which focused on quality and would eventually lead to emergence of California cuisine. In October 1976, along with business partners Suzy Stern (née Suzanne Denison), and Jane Zimmerman, McAuliffe officially began the New Albion Brewing Company, the name given to the San Francisco Bay Area by sailor-explorer Francis Drake, as well as a former San Francisco brewery of the same name, Albion Brewery. This marked the opening of the first microbrewery in America following Prohibition. The next year, the brewery brewed its first batch of ale. The facilities consisted of a shaded steel warehouse with shed housed food-grade 55 US gallons (200 L) Coca-Cola syrup drums he converted into brewhouse vessels and fermenters, a World War Two era bottle washer made from battleship decking, and a vintage 1910 bottle labeler.

Former New Albion employee (and Mendocino Brewing Company head brewer) Don Barkley described the process:

Jack built a three-level brewhouse, so it was all gravity fed: hot liquor on top, down to the mash tun...It was all homemade, a copper tube cooler that Jack made all by himself. Primary fermentation was in four open drums; we kept them in an air conditioned room, then after five to seven days, we racked the beer into 55 US gallons (200 L) drums on their sides with little fermentation locks.

“From there, once the beer settled, another week or two, we would pump it through – believe it or not, a beer meter. We had to have a beer meter and this one came out of a Hamm's brewery or somewhere like that. The beer would go into a ‘bottling tank’ – another 55 US gallons (200 L) drum with a three spout siphon filler.

“We had a hand crowner and then the bottles went on to a labeler. Jack had rebuilt a 1910 semi-automatic labeler. You’d press a foot pedal and these arms would come flying out with the label on them. You sort of got out of the way, stuck the labeled bottle somewhere or other...

New Albion brewed 7.5 barrels (217 US gallons (821 L)) per week, quickly selling every bottle upon completion. The brewery offered a pale ale, porter and stout, all bottle-conditioned for five weeks rather than pasteurized. The reputation of the brewery quickly spread, and visits from publications such as The New York Times, Washington Post, and Brewers Digest served to increase the company's profile. However, production was not enough to turn a profit, and six years after its founding, in November 1982, New Albion brewed its final batch of beer.

== Legacy ==
Despite its failure to survive, which McAuliffe recognized as inevitable due to limitations of space and equipment and inability to find new funding for expansion, the New Albion Brewing Company provided a microbrewery blueprint which, along with Maytag's Anchor Brewing, inspired the craft beer, microbrewing and brewpub movements which began in the 1980s and continue to the present day. Other early Northern California microbreweries such as the Sierra Nevada and Hopland Brewing Companies were influenced by New Albion, and their founders credit McAuliffe's creation for their early successes. Hopland (now Mendocino Brewing Company) inherited New Albion's brewing equipment, and former New Albion employee Don Barkley is the company's former head brewer, currently the master brewer at Napa Smith Brewery in Napa, California. Brewers throughout the country continue to cite New Albion's beer as their first craft beer experience. It has been described by one historian as "the most important failed brewery in the industry's history".

As part of their 30th Anniversary, Sierra Nevada Brewing Company released "Jack & Ken's Ale", a collaboration between Jack McAuliffe and Ken Grossman. The ale was released by Sierra Nevada as a tribute to McAuliffe's influence on the brewing of Grossman and his company, and was based on a barleywine seasonal brewed by New Albion entitled "Old Toe Sucker". The Marin Brewing Company in Larkspur, California brews an amber ale named Albion, which it claims is "named in recognition and memory of Sonoma’s New Albion Brewing Co."

The original signage from New Albion Brewery is displayed at the Russian River Brewing Company in Santa Rosa, and has been signed by Jack McAuliffe.

The New Albion name was eventually acquired by the Boston Beer Company some time prior to 2010. On August 1, 2012, Jim Koch, brewer and founder of Samuel Adams, announced they would be brewing New Albion Ale for the first time in 30 years, as well as transferring all of New Albion's current assets to McAuliffe. The beer was served at special events at the Great American Beer Festival and was available nationwide beginning January 2013. After the Boston Brewing production run, McAuliffe released a 5 gallon batch version of the original recipe to the public.

McAuliffe, who had retired, transferred the company to his daughter, Renee M. DeLuca. He died at age 80 on July 15, 2025. DeLuca is now brewing Jack's original recipes with BrewDog USA in Columbus, Ohio. BrewDog was founded in Scotland, where McAuliffe learned to enjoy porters, ales and stouts while in the Navy. Suzy Denison is retired and living in Seattle, Washington.

== See also ==
- List of breweries in California
- List of defunct breweries in the United States
