= Yakima Brewing =

Brewpub in Yakima, Washington

Yakima Brewing & Malting Co, also known as Grant's Brewery Pub, was a brewpub founded by Bert Grant in Yakima, Washington. With its opening in 1982, it was regarded as the first in the United States since Prohibition. The company produced beer independently or under a parent through 2004.

== History ==
In 1982, Scotland-born Bert Grant started a brewpub in Yakima's old opera house and later moved it to the city's train depot. The brewery began with a pale ale and eventually developed an IPA, an amber ale, a Scottish ale, an Imperial Stout, and several seasonal varieties. In 1995, Grant sold the brewpub and Yakima Brewing & Malting Co., to Stimson Lane Vineyards & Estates. A 20,000 sq ft (1,900 m^{2}) brewery was built in 1990 to expand production capacity. In 2001, shortly after Grant's death, Yakima Brewing and the brewpub were sold to Atlanta-based Black Bear Brewing, which had plans to build a national network of small regional breweries.

Yakima Brewing ran into financial difficulties. In 2003, it avoided foreclosure by giving its plant, property and equipment to International Wine & Spirits Ltd. and entering into a lease agreement. It was also found to be in violation of multiple state securities laws. Brewing operations and the pub were closed after the BNSF Railway won a judgment for more than $85,000 in unpaid rent on the property and legal costs in late 2004. A pub was opened for a third time at a boutique shopping center in 2005. It was closed two months later after the state revoked its liquor license.

== Legacy ==
Being the first of its kind opened in the United States since prohibition, the pub left a legacy in the brewing industry by re-establishing the business model and the craft model of what a brewpub could be. The chief executive of Redhook said that having such a brewpub was essential to fledgling craft brewers.

Grant's Scottish Ale was nationally acclaimed, while the IPA was considered one of the pioneers in the re-introduction and popularization of the style in America (especially with the demise of the legendary IPA made for many years by Ballantine Brewing Co.) . The Lazy Days seasonal ale won the 2004 English-Style Summer Ale gold World Beer Cup award. Grant's Imperial Stout is thought to be the first imperial stout brewed in the United States Grant also is credited with building the first hop pelletizing machine in the United States.

== Patents ==
Method for processing hops for brewing

Mixed solvent extraction of hops

Process for producing a fermented, carbonated beverage

Hopping of brewer's wort

== See also ==
- List of defunct breweries in the United States
