= Dave Line =

Dave Line (1942 – 1980) was a British beer author. An electrical engineer by profession, he is regarded as a pioneer in homebrewing during the 1970s because at the time homebrewing as a hobby was in its infancy. At the time of his early death from cancer he was 37, living in Southampton, was married and had a son.

== Homebrewing ==
In 1963, it had become free to homebrew in the UK, previously requiring an annual 5 Shilling licence, but would not yet become legal in the U.S. until President Jimmy Carter signed a bill into law in 1978 legalizing it.

People wanted to brew beer that matched the quality of commercial beer. In his first book "The Big Book of Brewing", Dave Line helped people to begin to reach the quality they were looking for, by using ingredients and processes that were used in breweries, with simple homebrewing equipment.

At the time people were not getting satisfactory results, because they were using substandard ingredients, low quality syrups or beer kits, baker's yeast, and were not technically informed in the processes of brewing. He advocated the use of proper brewer's yeast, whole-grain barley malts, whole hops, and even went into simple analysis and comparison of the chemistry of water used for brewing different beers, and rudimentary water treatment. He also encouraged sterilisation and proper cleaning of equipment.

He was a regular contributor to Amateur Winemaker, and in a decade, probably had more recipes published than anyone else.

== Bibliography ==
- The Big Book of Brewing (1974) ISBN 0-900841-34-6
- Brewing Beers Like Those You Buy (1978)
- Beer Kits and Brewing (1980)
