= Jack McAuliffe (brewer) =

American brewer (1945–2025)

Jack A. McAuliffe
- Born: May 11, 1945; Caracas, Venezuela
- Died: July 15, 2025 (aged 80); Siloam Springs, Arkansas, U.S.
- Occupations: Brewer; engineer
- Known for: New Albion Brewing Company
- Children: 1

John Robert McAuliffe (May 11, 1945 – July 15, 2025) was an American brewer best known as the founder of the New Albion Brewing Company in Sonoma, California. McAuliffe started the brewery, considered the first American microbrewery in the modern era, in 1976.

== Early life ==
McAuliffe was born on May 11, 1945, in Caracas, Venezuela. His father, John McAuliffe, intercepted and translated German documents for the FBI. At the conclusion of World War II, John McAuliffe was reassigned to a position with the United States Department of State in Tegucigalpa, Honduras, and then later in Medellín, Colombia. When Jack was in third grade, the family moved again to Fairfax, Virginia, after his father began working at American University.

As a teenager, McAuliffe became interested in welding, and worked as a volunteer with a local welder. He attended college for a year, but opted in 1964 to enlist in the United States Navy. He served on the USS Simon Lake in Dunoon, Scotland, working as a technician on maintenance of Polaris-class submarines. In Scotland, McAuliffe was impressed by the taste of local beers. In his cottage in Dunoon, he began homebrewing with equipment and a copy of Dave Line's The Big Book of Brewing purchased from a local hardware store. Eventually, he began sharing his beer with his fellow Naval personnel as well as Scottish locals. McAuliffe returned to the United States in 1968. He attended college on the G.I. Bill and graduated in 1971, initially working as an optical engineer in Sunnyvale, California.

== Career ==
In 1975, McAuliffe found a rental property outside of Sonoma, California, and quit his job in order to start a brewery there. With about $5,000, he renovated the old warehouse and constructed brewing equipment such as a malt bin and a bottling apparatus.

In October 1976, McAuliffe founded the New Albion Brewing Company with business partners Suzy Stern and Jane Zimmerman. The brewery was named in honor of the Albion Brewing Company, a San Francisco brewery from the turn of the century. New Albion was also a name given by Sir Francis Drake to an English claim on the Pacific Coast thought to be in modern Northern California. Eventually, McAuliffe sought a larger location for the company. Along with Fritz Maytag, then owner of Anchor Brewing Company in San Francisco, he lobbied California assemblyman Tom Bates, in the creation of California Assembly Bill 3610, which allowed the creation of establishments that created and served alcohol on premises, such as brewpubs. The bill went into effect in 1983, although New Albion went out of business the year before. (Prior legislation signed by Jerry Brown allowed "certain amounts" of such sales, but this legal ambiguity was addressed with the Bates bill.)

Although New Albion only existed for about six years, its beers impressed various people who would go on to found their own breweries. When the Mendocino Brewing Company was founded in 1983, it bought New Albion's brewing equipment and hired McAuliffe to work as a brewmaster. He did not stay long at Mendocino, however, and did not continue working in brewing, returning to work as an engineer.

== Personal life and death ==
McAuliffe had a daughter. He died at his home in Siloam Springs, Arkansas, on July 15, 2025, at the age of 80.

== Legacy ==
McAuliffe's influence on the American homebrewing and microbrewing movements in the United States is extensive. His work at New Albion inspired people such as Gordon Bowker of Redhook Ale Brewery, Jim Koch of the Boston Beer Company, Ken Grossman of Sierra Nevada Brewing Company, and homebrewer Charlie Papazian. Both Sierra Nevada and Boston Beer have created limited-edition beers honoring New Albion and McAuliffe's contributions to the craft brewing movement. Koch donated the profits from Boston Beer's New Albion products to McAuliffe, who in turn gave some of them to his daughter Renee DeLuca, who created New Albion anew in Cleveland.

Beer writer Tom Acitelli declared McAuliffe a "J. D. Salinger-like figure" due to his reclusive nature.

== Bibliography ==
- Infante, Jessica (June 16, 2025). "New Albion Co-Founder Jack McAuliffe Dies at 80". Brewbound.
- Holl, John (June 16, 2025). "Before Craft Beer was Born, there was Jack McAuliffe and New Albion". All About Beer.
- Acitelli, Tom (2011). "New York's Beer Debt to California". The New York Observer.
- Acitelli, Tom (2013). The Audacity of Hops: The History of America's Craft Beer Revolution. Chicago: Chicago Review Press. ISBN 9781613743881. OCLC 828193572.
- Armon, Rick (January 18, 2013). "Brewing icon Jack McAuliffe to visit Cleveland". Ohio.com. Archived from the original on June 3, 2013.
- Dzen, Gary (February 2, 2013). "Sam Adams re-creates New Albion IPA". The Boston Globe.
- Krebs, Peter (1998). Redhook: Beer Pioneer. New York: Four Walls Eight Windows. ISBN 1568581068. OCLC 39523255.
- Ogle, Maureen (2006). Ambitious Brew: the story of American beer. Orlando: Harcourt. ISBN 0151010129. OCLC 69241367.
- Richards, Kathleen (September 13, 2007). "Tom Bates: Beer Savior". East Bay Express.
- Risen, Clay (July 22, 2025). "Jack McAuliffe, Who Brewed a Craft Beer Revolution, Dies at 80". The New York Times.
