= Ken Grossman =

American businessman

- Born: November 11, 1954 (age 71); Los Angeles, California, U.S.
- Education: Butte College; California State University, Chico
- Known for: Co-founder, Sierra Nevada Brewing Company
- Spouse: Katie Gonser
- Children: 3

Ken Grossman (born November 11, 1954) is an American businessman and co-founder of Sierra Nevada Brewing Company.

== Early life ==
Grossman was born to a Jewish family in southern California on November 11, 1954. He studied at Butte College and California State University, Chico.

== Career ==
In 1978, Grossman founded Sierra Nevada Brewing Company in Chico, California with Paul Camusi.

The company brewed its first batch of beer, a stout, on November 15, 1980, followed closely by their flagship pale ale. During this decade, Grossman and his team concentrated on quality and consistency, dumping early batches until they could reliably reproduce a good product. They used returnable bottles initially and priced their beer competitively with imported beers. Their pale ale featured the Cascade hop, which was uncommon then for aroma, and was significantly hoppier than mainstream beers of that era. They deliberately brewed beers with unique and distinctive character to attract a niche market of consumers who appreciated flavorful and hoppy craft beers.

In 1998, Grossman bought out Camusi.

== Personal life ==
Grossman and his wife Katie (née Gonser) have three children and live in Chico, California. His son Brian and daughter Sierra will run the company when he retires. His son Brian moved to North Carolina to manage the new Sierra Nevada Brewery in Mills River, North Carolina which began production in 2014. His wife Katie is a teetotaler.
