= Pale ale =

Type of ale

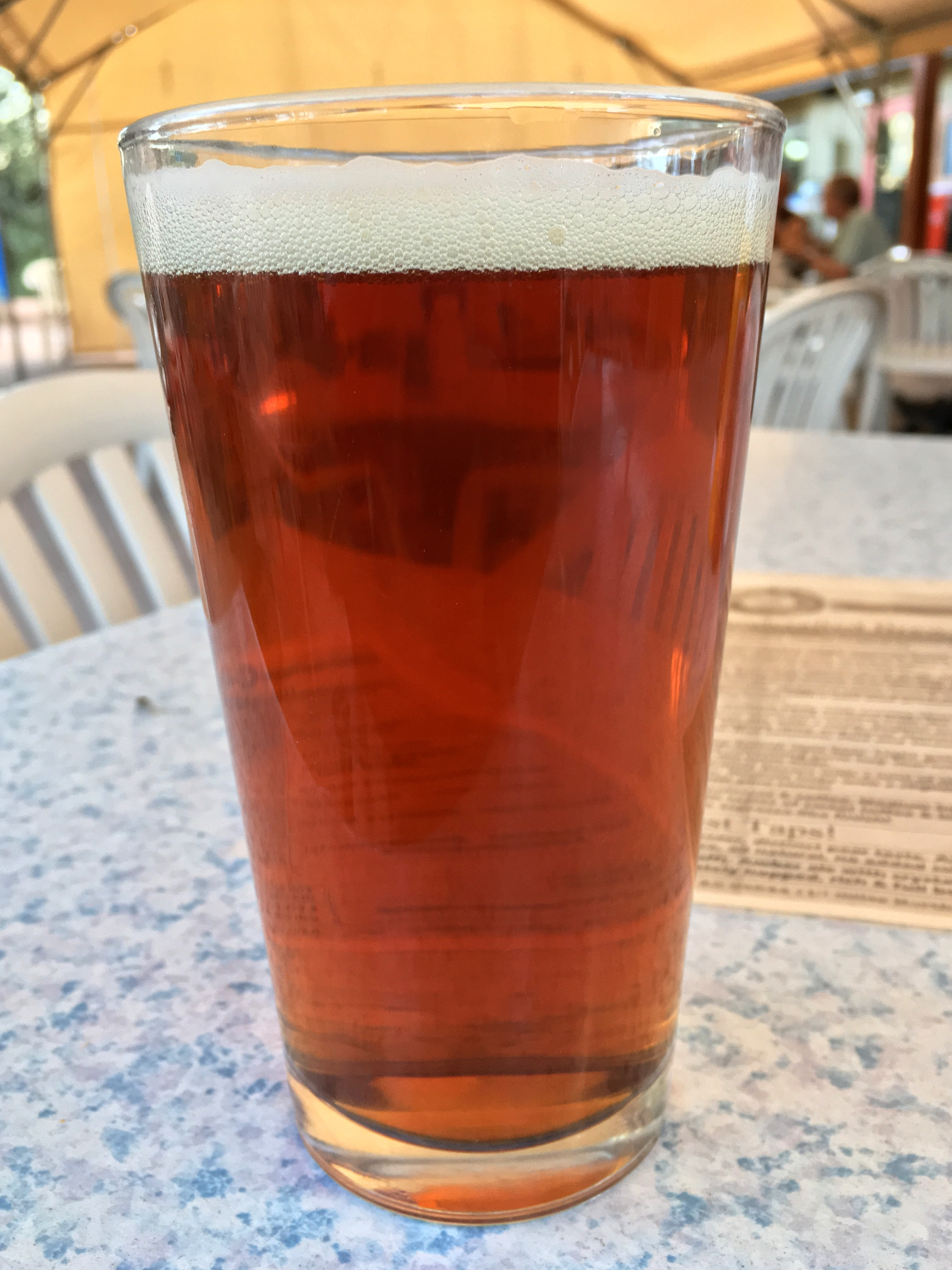
A dark amber American-brewed pale ale

Pale ale is a golden to amber coloured beer style brewed with pale malt. The term first appeared in England around 1703 for beers made from malts dried with high-carbon coke, which resulted in a lighter colour than other beers popular at that time. Different brewing practices and hop quantities have resulted in a range of tastes and strengths within the pale ale family. Pale ale is a kind of ale.

== History ==
Coke had been first used for dry roasting malt in 1642, but it was not until around 1703 that the term pale ale was first applied to beers made from such malt. By 1784, advertisements appeared in the Calcutta Gazette for "light and excellent" pale ale.

By 1830, the expressions bitter and pale ale were synonymous. Breweries tended to designate beers as "pale ales", though customers would commonly refer to the same beers as "bitters". It is thought that customers used the term bitter to differentiate these pale ales from other less noticeably hopped beers such as porters and milds.

== Types ==
Different brewing practices and hop levels have resulted in a range of taste and strength within the pale ale family.

=== Amber ale ===
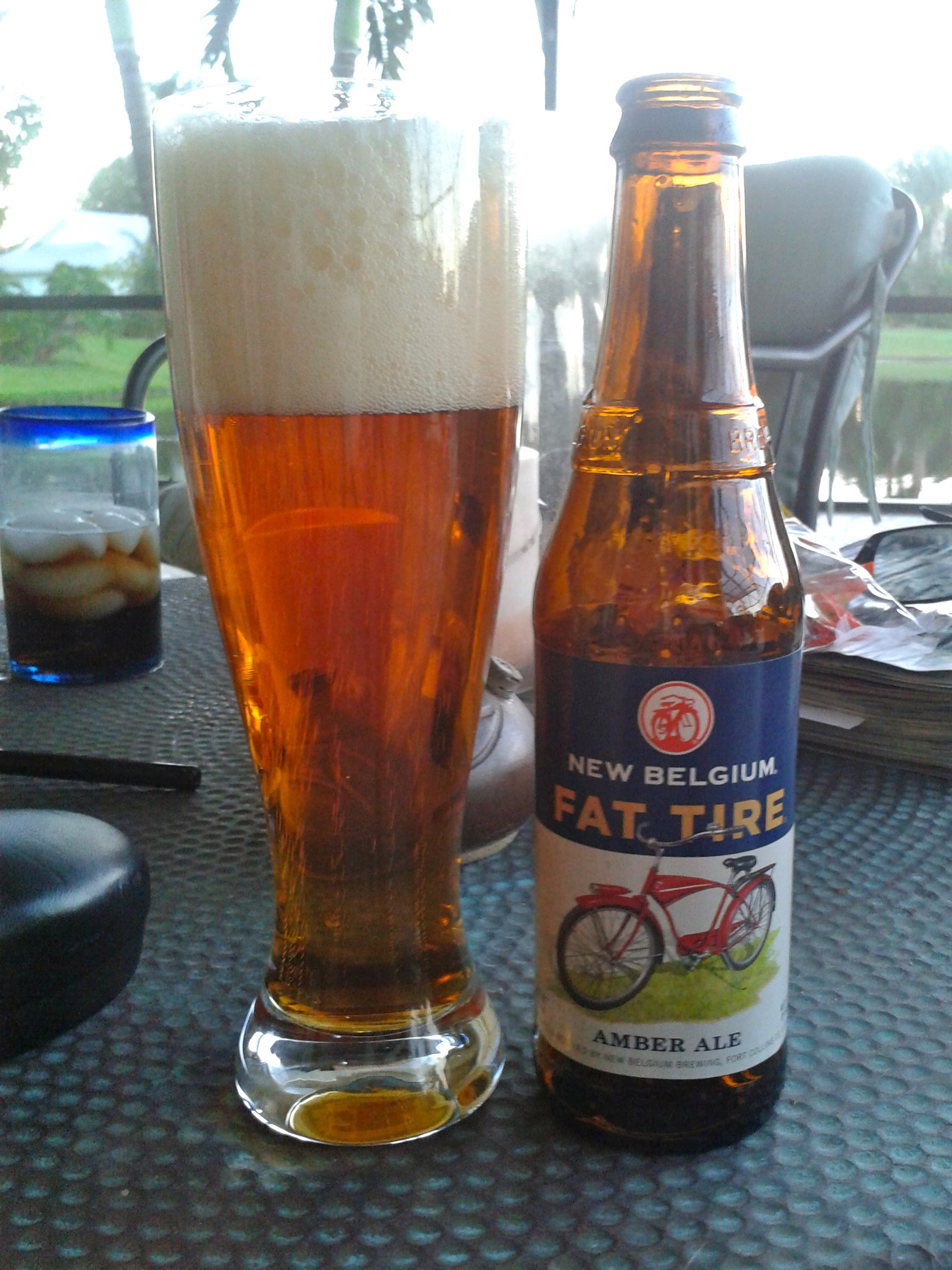
A lighter amber American-brewed "amber" ale

Collier Brothers of London applied for the UK trademark of The Amber Ale in 1876 and the trademark was maintained through changes in ownership until it expired in 2002. It was a "pure delicately hopped Pale Ale" positioned between their light bitter and IPA. Since the expiry of the trademark some traditional British bitters have been rebranded as amber ales, in some cases to distinguish them from golden ales sold under the same brand.

Amber ale is an emerging term used in Australia, France (as ambrée), Belgium and the Netherlands and North America for pale ales brewed with a proportion of amber malt and sometimes crystal malt to produce an amber colour generally ranging from light copper to light brown. A small amount of crystal or other coloured malt is added to the basic pale ale base to produce a slightly darker colour, as in some Irish and British pale ales. In France the term "ambrée" is used to signify a beer, either cold or warm fermented, which is amber in colour; the beer, as in Pelforth ambrée and Fischer amber, may be a Vienna lager, or it may be a bière de garde as in Jenlain ambrée. In North America, American-variety hops are used in amber ales with varying degrees of bitterness, although very few examples are particularly hoppy. Diacetyl is barely perceived or is absent in an amber ale.

=== American pale ale ===
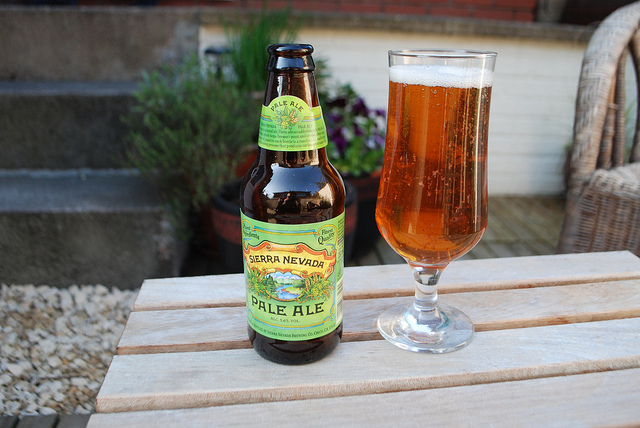
Sierra Nevada Pale Ale, a prototypical American pale ale

Anchor Liberty Ale, a 6% abv ale originally brewed by the Anchor Brewing Company as a special in 1975 to commemorate Paul Revere's "Midnight Ride" in 1775, was seen by Michael Jackson, a writer on beverages, as the first modern American ale. Fritz Maytag, the owner of Anchor, visited British breweries in London, Yorkshire and Burton upon Trent, picking up information about robust pale ales, which he applied when he made his American version, using just malt rather than the malt and sugar combination common in brewing at that time, and making prominent use of the American hop, Cascade. By 1983, it was commonly found.

The brewery thought to be the first to successfully use significant quantities of American hops in the notably hoppy style of an APA and use the specific name "pale ale" was the Sierra Nevada Brewing Company. It brewed the first experimental batch of Sierra Nevada Pale Ale in November 1980, distributing the finished version in March 1981. Other pioneers of a hoppy American pale ale are Jack McAuliffe of the New Albion Brewing Company and Bert Grant of Yakima Brewing.

American pale ales are generally around 5% abv, with significant quantities of American hops, typically Cascade. Although American-brewed beers tend to use a cleaner yeast, and American two row malt, it is the use of strong American hops in particular that distinguish an APA from a British or European pale ale. The style is close to the American India pale ale (IPA), and boundaries blur, though IPAs are stronger and more assertively hopped. The style is also close to amber ale, though these are darker and maltier due to the use of crystal malts.

=== Australian pale ale ===
Developed in Australia around the 1990s, Australian pale ales are generally about 6% abv with significant quantities of Australian hops, typically Galaxy.

=== Bière de garde ===
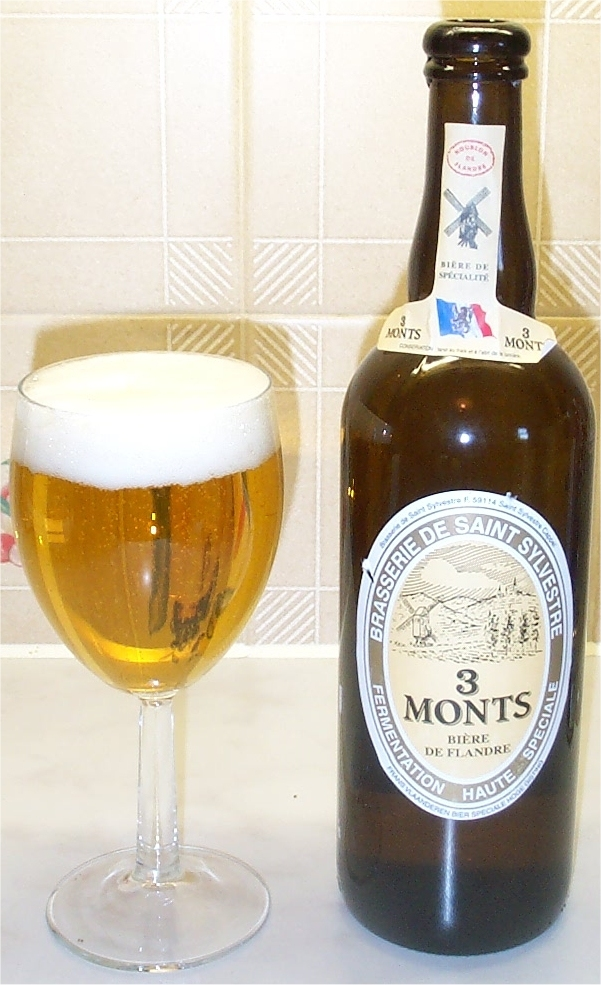
A bière de garde

Bière de garde, or "keeping beer", is a pale ale traditionally brewed in the Nord-Pas-de-Calais region of France. These beers were usually brewed by farmhouses in the winter and spring, to avoid unpredictable problems with the yeast during the summertime.

The origin of the name lies in the tradition that it was matured or cellared for a period of time once bottled (most were sealed with a cork), to be consumed later in the year, akin to a saison.

Among the better French known "bières de garde" are Brasserie de Saint-Sylvestre, Trois Monts, Brasseurs Duyck, Jenlain and Brasserie La Choulette, ambrée.

=== Blonde ===
Blonde ales are very pale in colour. The term "blonde" for pale beers is common in Europe and South America – particularly in France, Italy, Belgium, the Netherlands, the UK, and Brazil – though the beers may not have much in common, other than colour. Blondes tend to be clear, crisp, and dry, with low-to-medium bitterness and aroma from hops, and some sweetness from malt. Fruitiness from esters may be perceived. A lighter body from higher carbonation may be noticed.

In the United Kingdom, golden or summer ales were developed in the late 20th century by breweries to compete with the pale lager market. A typical golden ale has an appearance and profile similar to that of a pale lager. Malt character is subdued and the hop profile ranges from spicy to citrus; common hops include Styrian Golding and Cascade. Alcohol is in the 4% to 5% abv range. The UK style is attributed to John Gilbert, owner of Hop Back Brewery, who developed "Summer Lightning" in 1989, which won several awards and inspired numerous imitators.

Belgian blondes are often made with pilsner malt. Some beer writers regard blonde and golden ales as distinct styles, while others do not. Duvel is a typical Belgian blonde ale, and one of the most popular bottled beers in the country as well as being well known internationally.

=== Burton pale ale ===
Late in the second half of the nineteenth century, the recipe for pale ale was put into use by the Burton upon Trent brewers, notably Bass; ales from Burton were considered of a particularly high quality due to synergy between the malt and hops in use and local water chemistry, especially the presence of gypsum. Burton retained absolute dominance in pale ale brewing until a chemist, C. W. Vincent, discovered the process of Burtonization to reproduce the chemical composition of the water from Burton-upon-Trent, thus giving any brewery the capability to brew pale ale.

=== English bitter ===
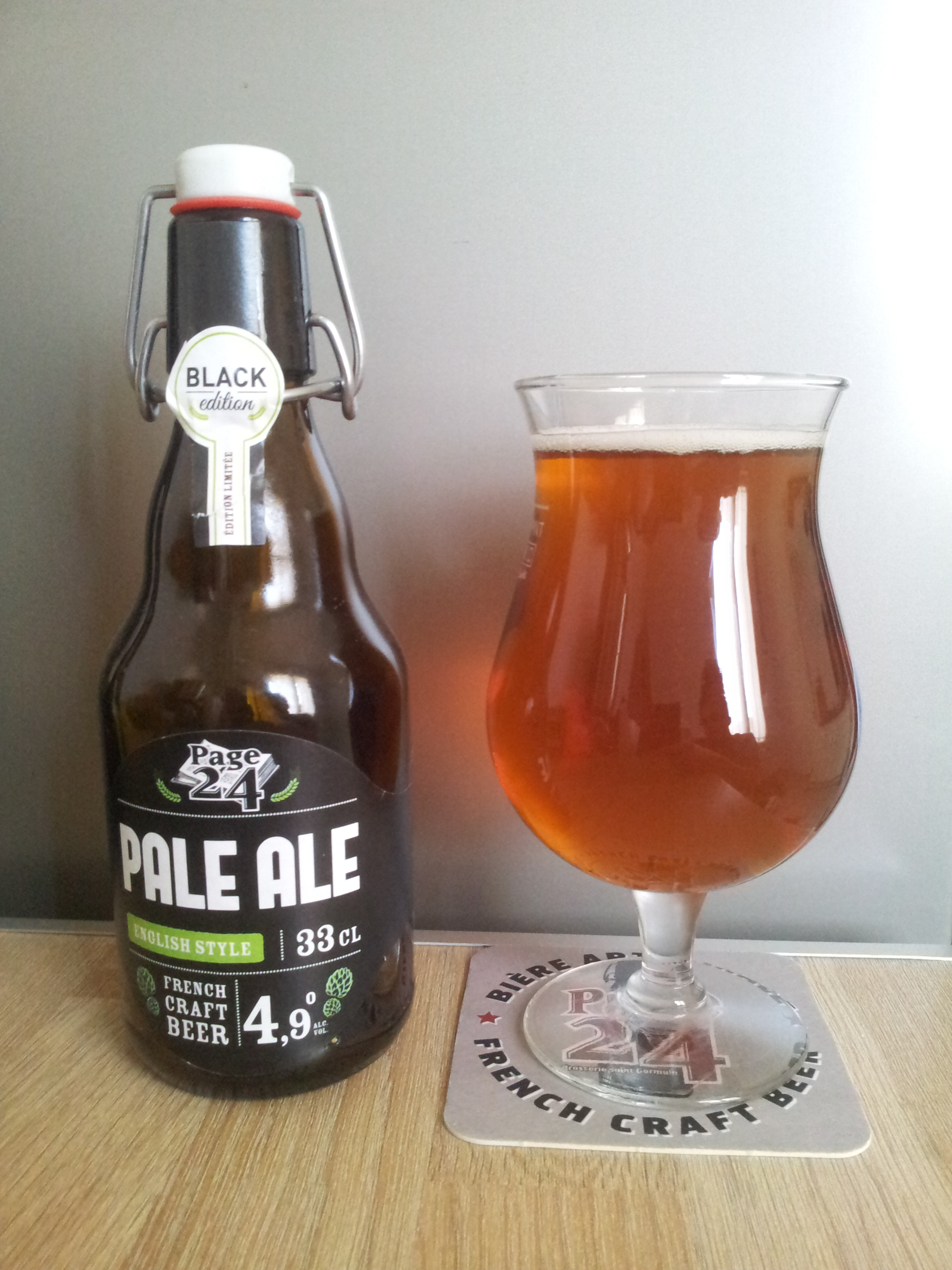
A French craft version of an English-style pale ale

The expression English bitter first appeared in the early 19th century as part of the development and spread of pale ale.

=== Extra Pale Ale (XPA) ===
A loosely defined style which is similar to India Pale Ale (IPA) but usually lower in alcohol. The term was first used in the United States in the 1980s and has become popular with craft breweries in Australia since the 2010s.

=== India pale ale (IPA) ===
India pale ale (IPA) is a style of pale ale developed in England for export to India. The first known use of the expression "India pale ale" is in an advertisement in the Sydney Gazette and New South Wales Advertiser on 27 August 1829.

Worthington White Shield, originating in Burton-upon-Trent, is a beer considered to be part of the development of India pale ale.

The colour of an IPA can vary from a light gold to a reddish amber.

=== Irish red ale ===
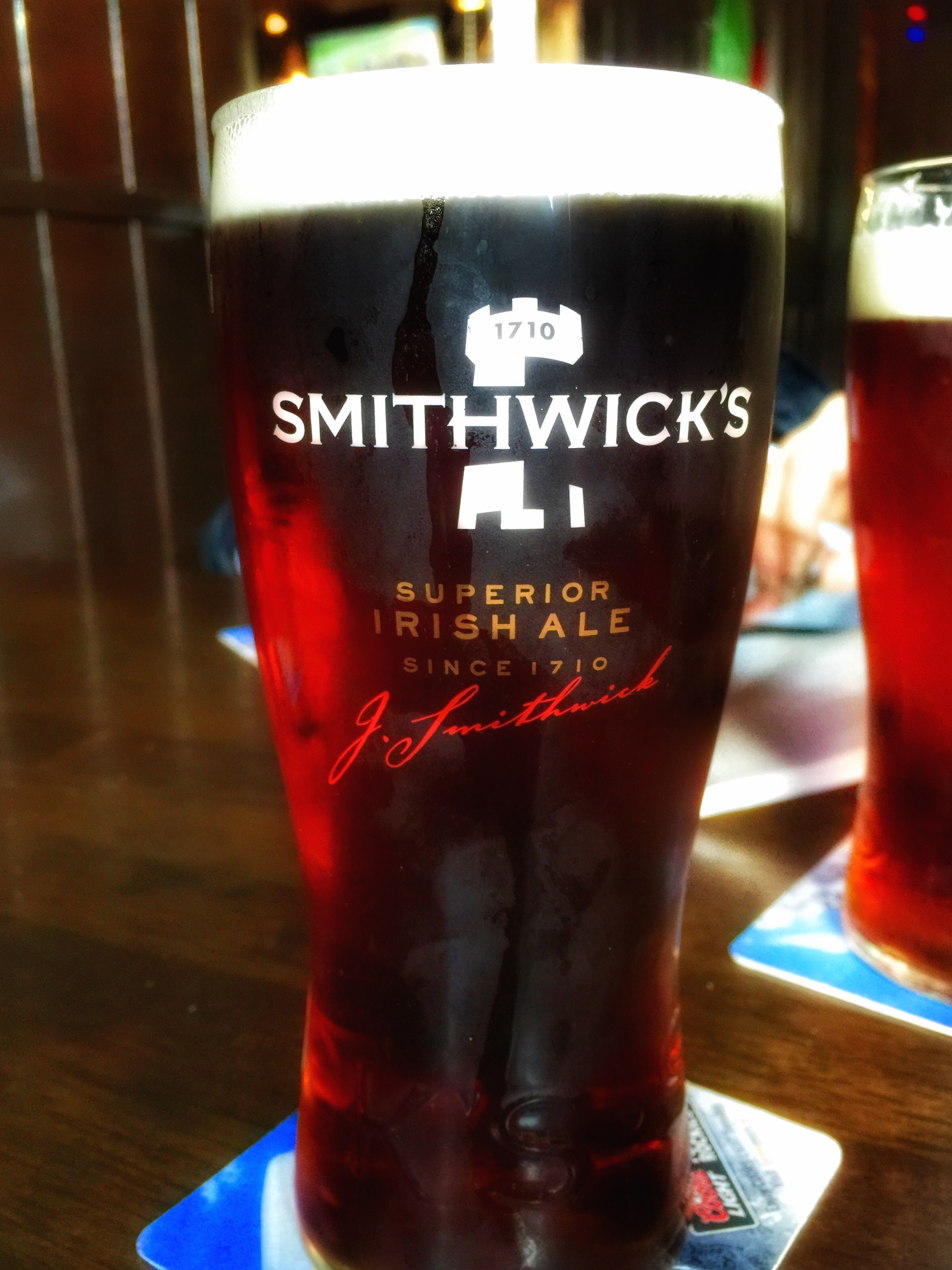
A pint of Smithwick's, the genre-defining Irish red ale

The term "Irish red ale" was popularised in the United States and subsequently exported worldwide. The additional variants "red ale", "Irish ale" (Irish: leann dearg,) and "Irish red", have come to be used by brewers mainly in Ireland and the United States, less so elsewhere. Smithwick's and Kilkenny are typical examples of macro-brewed commercial Irish red ale. There are many other smaller and craft examples, such as O'Hara's, Sullivan's, Murphy's, Porterhouse and Franciscan Well.

Irish red ales are characterised by their malt profile and typically have a sweet, caramel or toffee-like taste, low bitterness and amber to red colour - hence the name.

Irish brewers have increasingly adopted the term Irish Red Ale to distinguish their beers in both the domestic and international markets. In the US, the name can also be used simply to describe a darker amber ale, or the abbreviated term "Irish Red" applied to a "reddish" beer brewed as a lager and ambered with caramel colouring - for example Killian's Irish Red.

=== Strong pale ale ===
Strong pale ales are ales made predominantly with pale malts and have an alcohol strength that may start around 5%, though typically at 7 or 8% by volume, and may go up to 12%, though some brewers have been pushing the alcohol strength higher to produce novelty beers. In 1994, the Hair of the Dog Brewing Company produced a strong pale ale with an alcohol by volume of 29%. In 2010, Brewdog released "Sink the Bismarck!", a 41% abv pale ale, which is stronger than typical U.S. distilled spirits (40% abv).
