= Sierra Nevada Brewing Company =

Brewery in the United States

Coordinates: 39°43′24″N 121°48′57″W

Sierra Nevada Brewing Co.
- Type: Privately held company
- Location: Chico, California, United States
- Opened: November 1980; 46 years ago
- Annual production volume: 1,250,000 US beer barrels (1,470,000 hl)
- Owner: Ken Grossman
- Employees: 1050
- Website: https://sierranevada.com/

Sierra Nevada Brewing Co. is a Chico, California, United States, based brewing company. Established in 1980 by homebrewers Ken Grossman and Paul Camusi, as of 2026 it was the second-largest craft brewer in the United States according to the Brewers Association and the second largest privately owned independent brewery in the United States.

The brewery produced 786,000 US bbl (922,000 hl) in 2010, a year it was named "Green Business of the Year" by the United States Environmental Protection Agency for its sustainable practices. In 2014, a second brewery location was opened in Mills River, North Carolina. That second location is the first, and remains the only, Platinum LEED certified production brewery in the U.S. and it is also a Platinum Zero Waste facility, certified by the US Zero Waste Business Council.

Sierra Nevada is considered one of the earliest and most influential American craft breweries in the latter half of the 20th century..

== History ==
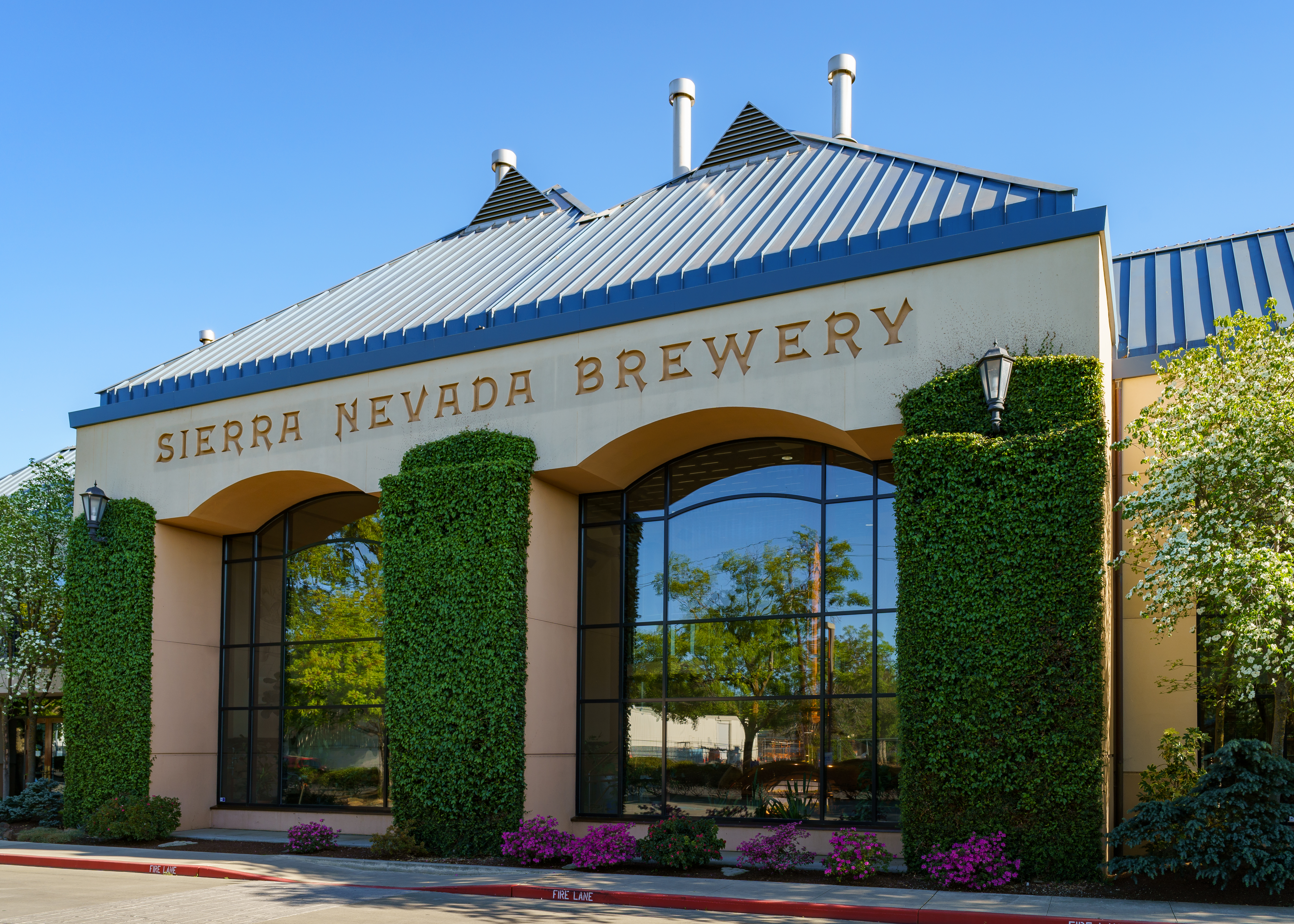
Headquarters in Chico, California

Sierra Nevada Brewing Co. was founded in 1980, with founders Ken Grossman and Paul Camusi expanding their homebrewing hobby into a brewery in Chico, California. Along with the brewery's location, Grossman says the company's name comes from his love of hiking in the mountains of the Sierra Nevada. With $50,000 in loans from friends and family, Grossman and Camusi rented a 3,000 sq ft (280 m^{2}) warehouse and pieced together discarded dairy equipment and scrapyard metal to create their brewing equipment. They later were able to acquire second-hand copper brewing kettles from Germany before moving to their larger, current brewing facility in 1989.

The first batch brewed on premises was its Pale Ale, in November 1980. The following year, the brewery introduced Celebration, a fresh hop IPA, which continues to be released as a winter seasonal. The company sold 950 US beer barrels (1,110 hl) of beer in its first year and doubled that amount in the second.

The company's first employee was Steve Harrison, who was put in charge of marketing and sales. Head brewer Steve Dresler was hired in 1983, when its output was 25 to 30 barrels per week, and retired in 2017.

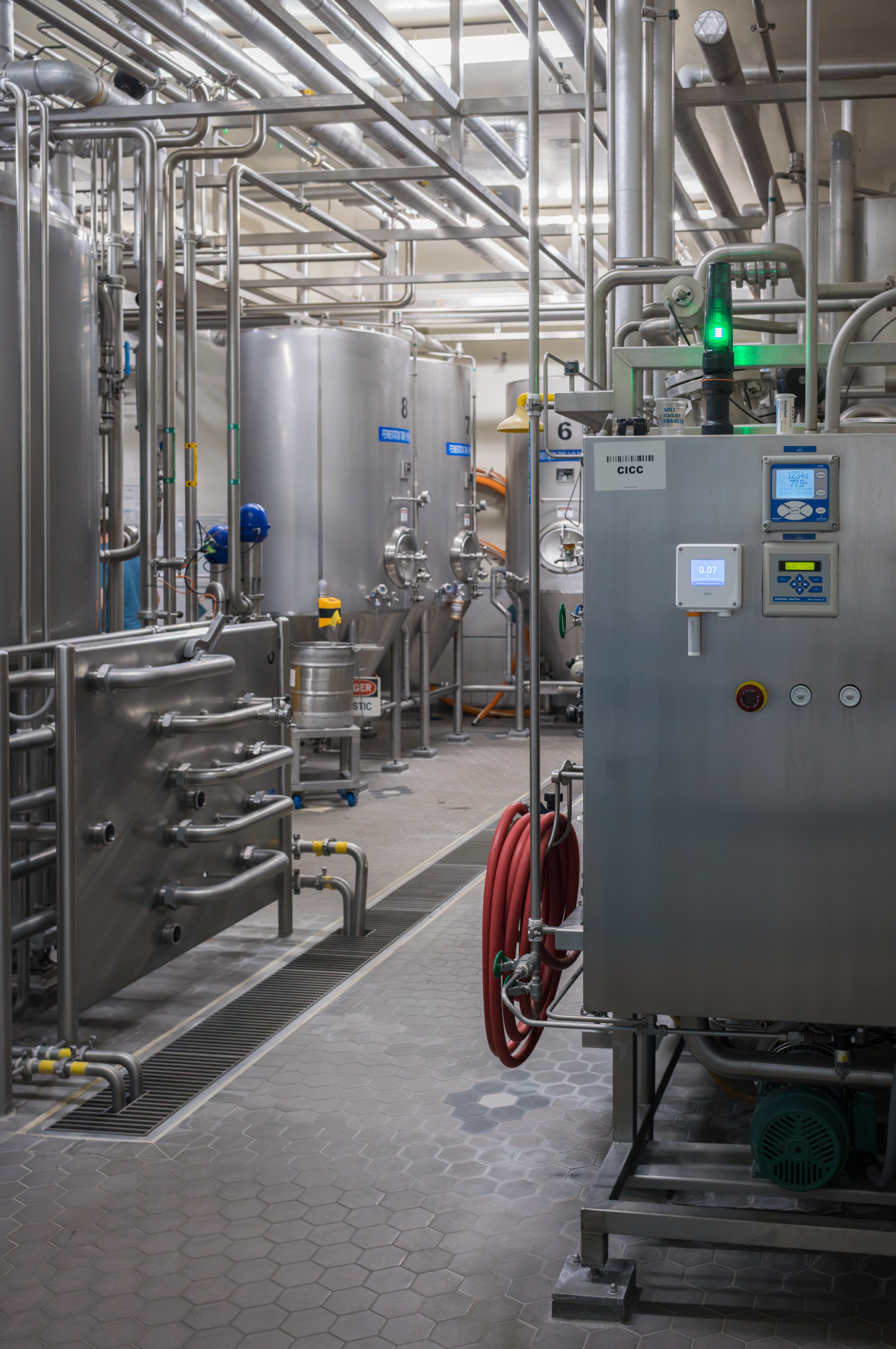
Interior of Sierra Nevada Brewery in Chico

The company distributed the beer itself in the early 1980s, struggling with financial and marketing problems. A 1982 article in the San Francisco Chronicle highlighting the brewery, as well as having its beer sold in prominent restaurants such as Berkeley's Chez Panisse, helped establish a market for Sierra Nevada's beer.

By 1987, the brewery was distributing to seven states and production had reached 12,000 US beer barrels (14,000 hl) per year, causing the company to pursue building a new brewery. In 1988, the brewery moved into a 100-barrel brewhouse, with four open fermenters, and eleven 200 US bbl (230 hl) secondary fermenters. A year later, Grossman and Camusi added the Sierra Nevada Taproom and Restaurant, which serves lunch and dinner and includes a giftshop. In 2000, the brewery opened "The Big Room", a live-music venue located inside the brewery's facilities, featuring a variety of acts including country, bluegrass, folk, rock, blues, and other musical genres.

Camusi retired in 1998 and sold his share in the company to Grossman.

In 2010, Sierra Nevada Brewing partnered with the Abbey of New Clairvaux, with the monastery beginning production of Trappist-style beers in 2011. The Abbey has not yet been sanctioned by the International Trappist Association, and therefore the monastery will not be brewing official Trappist beer.

The brewery employed about 450 people in 2011.

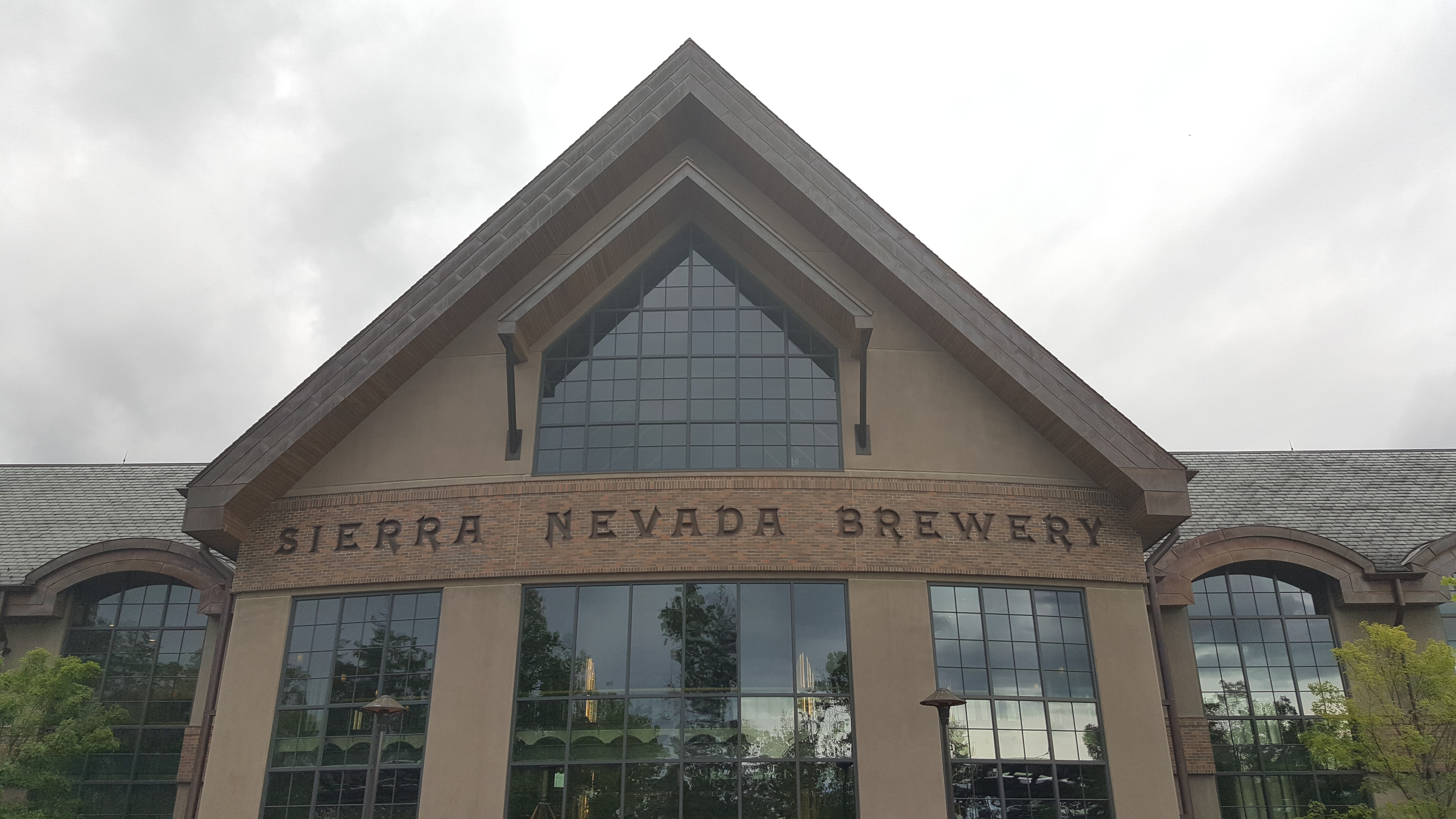
Entrance to Mills River brewery

In January 2012, Sierra Nevada announced it would build a second brewing facility with an attached restaurant in Mills River, North Carolina. The LEED-Platinum-certified building opened in early 2014 on a forested tract adjacent to Asheville Regional Airport, re-using the cut-down trees as lumber both in the building and for the rainwater cisterns that flush the toilets.

From 2013 to 2022, the company operated the "Torpedo Room" in Berkeley, their first tasting room outside of Chico.

In January 2017, Sierra Nevada issued a voluntary recall of certain 12-ounce bottles of different beers in 36 states due to a manufacturing defect that had possibly introduced chipped pieces of glass into the bottle.

== Influence ==
Along with the now-defunct Anchor Brewing Company in San Francisco and New Albion Brewing Company in Sonoma, whose owners offered Grossman and Camusi early guidance in their venture, Sierra Nevada is considered one of the earliest and most influential breweries which spawned the craft beer movement of the 1980s–90s. Grossman has been dubbed a "pioneer" by fellow craft brewers in the United States.

Whereas many of the newly spawned microbreweries of the 1980s went out of business, Sierra Nevada Brewing endured to become one of the largest independent brewers in the country, whose beers were noted for their "character and complexity". Grossman believed many microbrewers of the early 1980s had put out an inferior product due to lack of preparation for the financial and mechanical realities of commercial brewing, which were a "much different process" from homebrewing.

For its 30th anniversary in 2010, the company released a series of collaborative beers with the assistance of those Grossman considered an early influence on his brewing: Charlie Papazian, Fred Eckhardt, Fritz Maytag (Anchor) and Jack McAuliffe (New Albion).

In November 2010, Stansbury Publishing released Hops and Dreams: The Story of Sierra Nevada Brewing Co, written by California State University, Chico professor Rob Burton, who researched the company for three years.

The company has claimed to be neutral on political issues, and reiterated this stance in 2010 when it was erroneously linked by a beer industry group to opposing the California Proposition 19 of that year, which would have legalized marijuana in the state.

== Environmental record ==
Sierra Nevada Brewing Co. won the US Environmental Protection Agency's "Green Business of the Year" award for 2010.

The brewery is powered by solar energy, having 10,000 photovoltaic modules covering its rooftops and parking lot. In all, the brewery uses 2.6 megawatts of solar electricity on premises. It also has built a charging station for electric vehicles on its premises.

The company uses a small-scale BioPro™ biodiesel processor to convert the used cooking oil from its restaurant for biodiesel use in its delivery trucks. In 2009, it reached an agreement with a local ethanol company to produce high-grade ethanol fuel from its discarded yeast. Spent grain is sold to local cattle ranchers for livestock feed; spent water is sent to the brewery's own water treatment plant, where it is reused, mainly as drip irrigation for its fields. Over 99.5% of the brewery plant's solid waste is diverted from landfill.

The company owns one mile of railway in Chico for use in intermodal freight transport. With each rail car holding the equivalent of four semi-trailers of grain, rail transport is more fuel efficient than road transport, aiding in reducing the brewery's carbon footprint.

Sierra Nevada is the largest buyer of organic hops in the United States. It also farms its own organic hops and barley for use in its annual Chico Estate Harvest Ale release.

Sierra Nevada Brewing Company's Mills River, NC facility earned a LEED Platinum certification in June 2016. Sierra Nevada's Mills River brewery is the only LEED Platinum certified production brewery in the USA. The Mills River brewery is also a Platinum Zero Waste facility, certified by the US Zero Waste Business Council.

== Beers ==
=== Sierra Nevada Classics ===
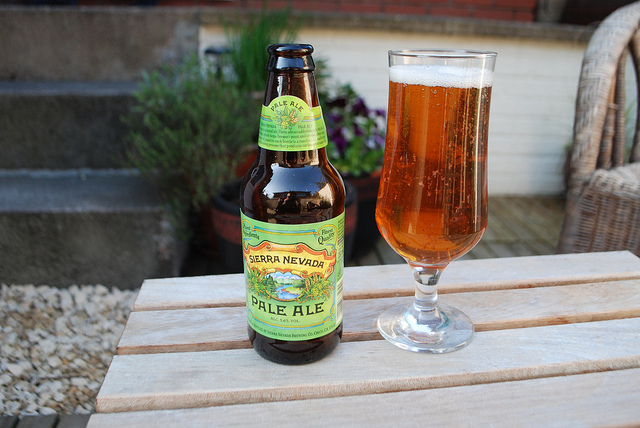
Sierra Nevada Pale Ale

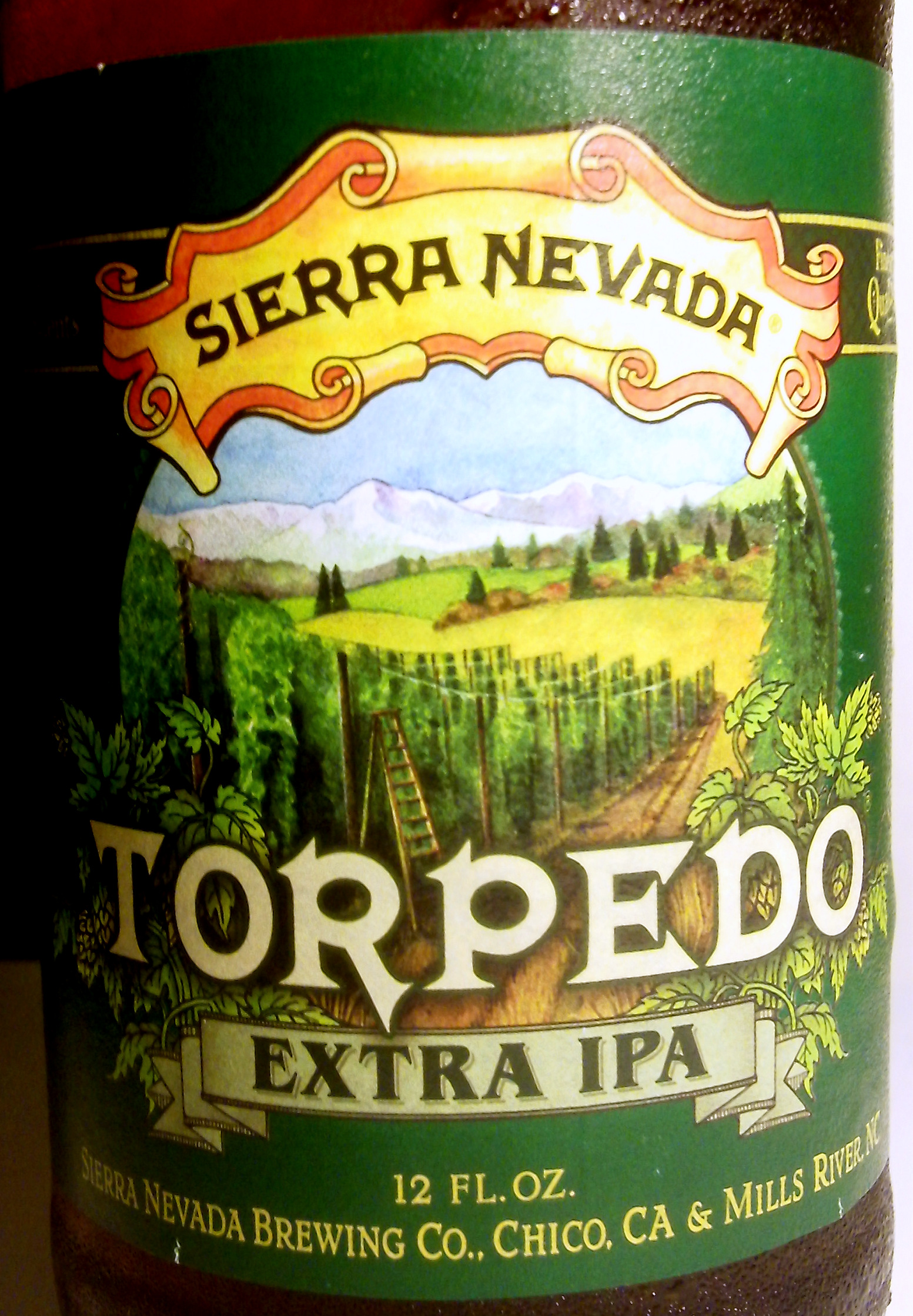
Sierra Nevada Torpedo Ale label, from a bottle purchased in Chico, California.

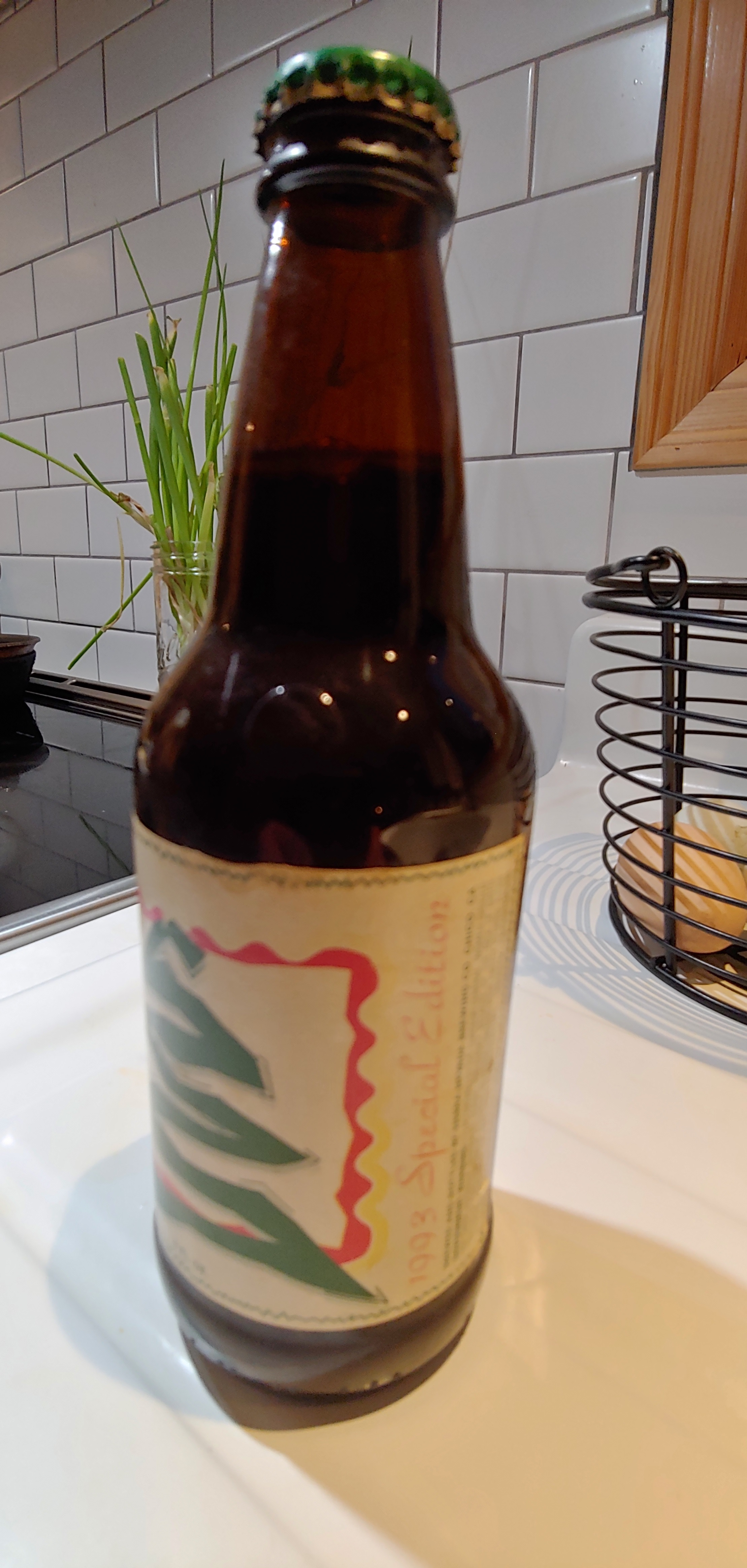
Sierra Nevada Chico News & Review Special Edition 1993

Sierra Nevada Celebration Ale 2008-2013

The brewery's year-round offerings include its Pale Ale, Porter, Stout, Torpedo 'Extra' IPA, Kellerweis Hefeweizen, and Hazy Little Thing.

Sierra's flagship pale ale has been described as "a balance between aggressive hops and hearty malt flavor", with its Cascade hops offering a grapefruit aroma and fruity palate. Like several other Sierra Nevada offerings, it is bottle-conditioned. It is the best-selling pale ale in the United States as of 2012.

Sierra Nevada's porter, along with its heavier stout version, have been described by writer Michael Jackson as "gently coffeish" and "beautifully roasty" examples of their respective styles. The two offerings have been brewed since the company's first year of operation.

Torpedo is an American India pale ale, and Kellerweis is a traditional Bavarian hefeweizen. Both were introduced as nationwide offerings in 2009.

=== Seasonals ===
The brewery's current lineup of seasonals include Beer Camp Hoppy Lager, Summerfest Lager, Oktoberfest, and Celebration Ale.

Sierra Nevada's Celebration Ale has been brewed as a winter seasonal since 1981. While it has won medals under the IPA category, it has also been described as a hoppy, malty amber ale, as well as a "bigger version" of the company's pale ale.

Previous Autumn seasonal Tumbler Brown Ale has been described as a full-bodied, malt-heavy brown ale and is sold for the autumn months.

Previous Spring seasonal Ruthless Rye IPA is an IPA brewed with rye and whole-cone hops for the spring, while Summerfest is a pilsner brewed in the Czech tradition.

=== Special release ===
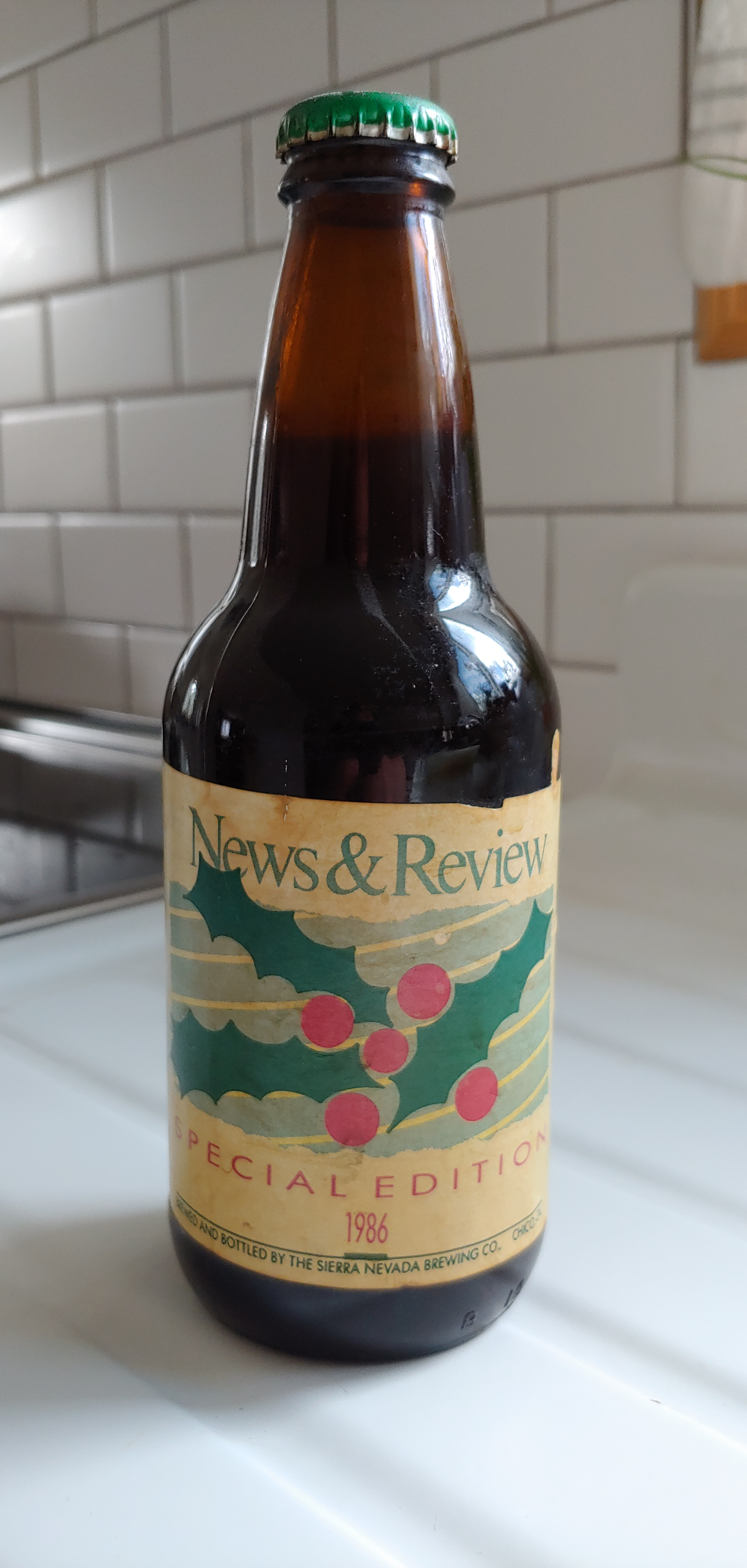
Sierra Nevada Chico News & Review 1986

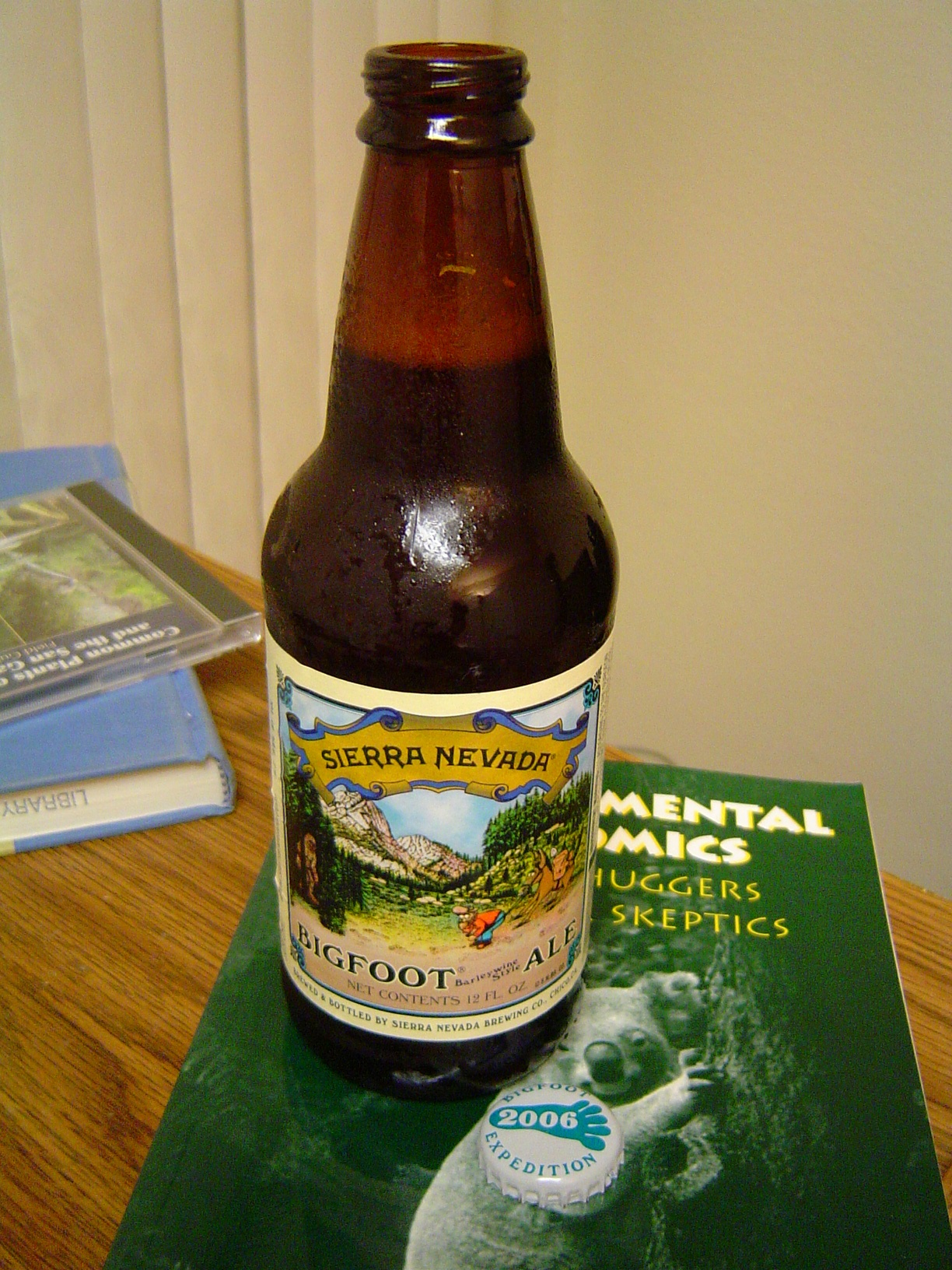
Bigfoot, 2006 Edition

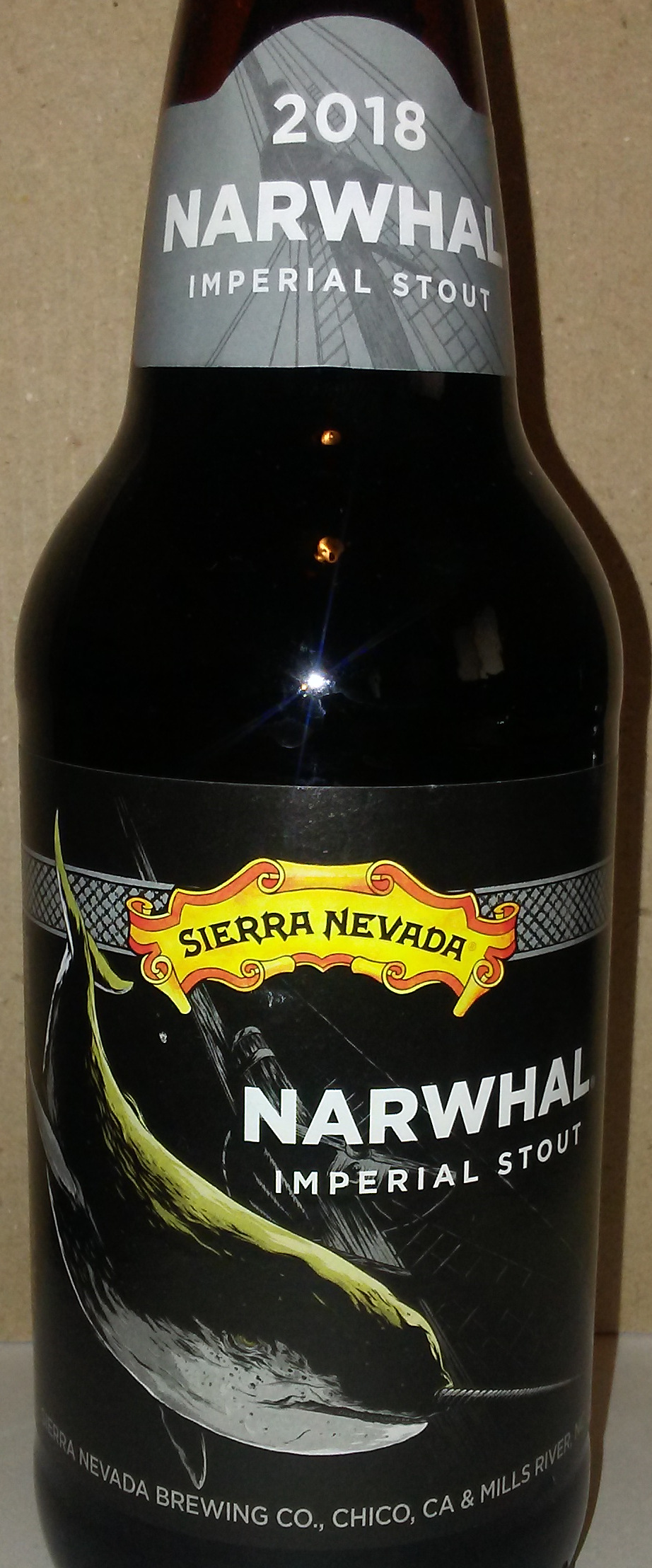
Narwhal Imperial Stout 2018

Annual "Special Release" beers produced by Sierra Nevada include Bigfoot Barleywine Style Ale, Hemisphere Harvest Ales and Chico Harvest Estate Ale.

Bigfoot is brewed with two types of malt and three differing hops, and tops out at 9.6%ABV. It is a barleywine, but due to alcohol laws in the U.S. it must be marketed as a "barleywine style ale". Only alcohols derived from fruits, not grains, can be marketed as wine. It first won medals at the Great American Beer Festival in 1987. It is generally released January–February of each year.

The brewery releases both a Northern and Southern Hemisphere Harvest "wet hop" ale. Introduced in 1996 as Harvest Ale, Northern Hemisphere uses wet (undried) hops from eastern Washington for its "fresh harvest" ale. It was the first fresh-hop ale brewed in the United States. The brewery later introduced Southern Hemisphere which features wet hops from New Zealand.

The Chico Estate Harvest Ale is brewed with organic wet hops and barley grown on the brewery's premises.

Old Chico Crystal Wheat, a wheat beer, is named in memory of the Chico Brewery which operated in the town during the 19th century. Old Chico brand beers are only distributed in the northern California area around Chico.

The "Resilience Butte County Proud IPA" is a limited edition IPA, released to benefit recovery efforts for the Camp Fire, which impacted areas nearby Sierra Nevada's Chico brewery in 2018; about 50 Sierra Nevada employees lost their homes in the fire. Resilience IPA is brewed at the Chico and Mills River, North Carolina breweries, and over 1,500 other breweries signed up to brew and sell the beer.

=== Awards ===
Name	Style	Awards		
Name	Style	Year	Event	Award
Barrel-Aged Narwhal	Wood-Aged Strong Stout	2013	Great American Beer Festival	Silver
Bigfoot	Barley Wine	2012	World Beer Cup	Silver
Bigfoot	Barley Wine	2005	Great American Beer Festival	Gold
Bigfoot	Barley Wine	1997	Great American Beer Festival	Silver
Bigfoot	Barley Wine	1995	Great American Beer Festival	Gold
Bigfoot	Barley Wine	1992	Great American Beer Festival	Gold
Bigfoot	Barley Wine	1988	Great American Beer Festival	Gold
Bigfoot	Barley Wine	1987	Great American Beer Festival	Gold
Celebration	India Pale Ale	1994	Great American Beer Festival	Silver
Celebration	India Pale Ale	1990	Great American Beer Festival	Bronze
Estate Homegrown Ale	Fresh Hop Ale	2012	Great American Beer Festival	Gold
Estate Homegrown Ale	Fresh Hop Ale	2010	Great American Beer Festival	Silver
Imperial Stout	Imperial Stout	2012	Great American Beer Festival	Silver
IPA	India Pale Ale	2005	Great American Beer Festival	Gold
Kellerweis	Hefeweizen	2012	World Beer Cup	Silver
Kolsch	Kölsch	2009	Great American Beer Festival	Gold
Kolsch	Kölsch	2008	Great American Beer Festival	Silver
Ovila Dubbel	Dubbel	2012	World Beer Cup	Bronze
Pilsner	Pilsner	2010	World Beer Cup	Gold
Porter	Porter	2009	U.S. Open Beer Championship	Bronze
Porter	Porter	2000	Great American Beer Festival	Bronze
Porter	Porter	1983	Great American Beer Festival	Silver
Ruthless Rye PA	Rye Ale	2012	World Beer Cup	Gold
Sierra 30 Jack and Ken's Ale	Barley Wine	2010	Great American Beer Festival	Gold
Pale Ale	Pale Ale	1995	Great American Beer Festival	Gold
Pale Ale	Pale Ale	1993	Great American Beer Festival	Gold
Pale Ale	Pale Ale	1992	Great American Beer Festival	Gold
Pale Ale	Pale Ale	1990	Great American Beer Festival	Gold
Pale Ale	Pale Ale	1989	Great American Beer Festival	Gold
Pale Ale	Pale Ale	1987	Great American Beer Festival	Bronze
Pale Ale	Pale Ale	1983	Great American Beer Festival	Gold
Stout	Stout	2004	World Beer Cup	Bronze
Stout	Stout	1989	Great American Beer Festival	Silver
Stout	Stout	1988	Great American Beer Festival	Silver
Stout	Stout	1987	Great American Beer Festival	Bronze
Summerfest	Lager	2004	Great American Beer Festival	Bronze
Summerfest	Lager	1991	Great American Beer Festival	Silver
Weizenbock	Wheat Ale	2011	Great American Beer Festival	Silver
Wheat	Wheat Ale	1998	Great American Beer Festival	Bronze

== See also ==
- California breweries
- Craft beer
- Barrel-aged beer

== External links and further reading ==
- Sierra Nevada Brewing Co. Official website at sierranevada.com
- "BioPro™ Biodiesel Processor Manufacture". Springboard Biodiesel, LLC.
- Hops and Dreams: The Story of Sierra Nevada Brewing Co. Stansbury Publishing.
- "Preview". Mutineer Magazine (4). Archived from the original on December 2, 2010.
