= Cascade hop =

Agricultural crop

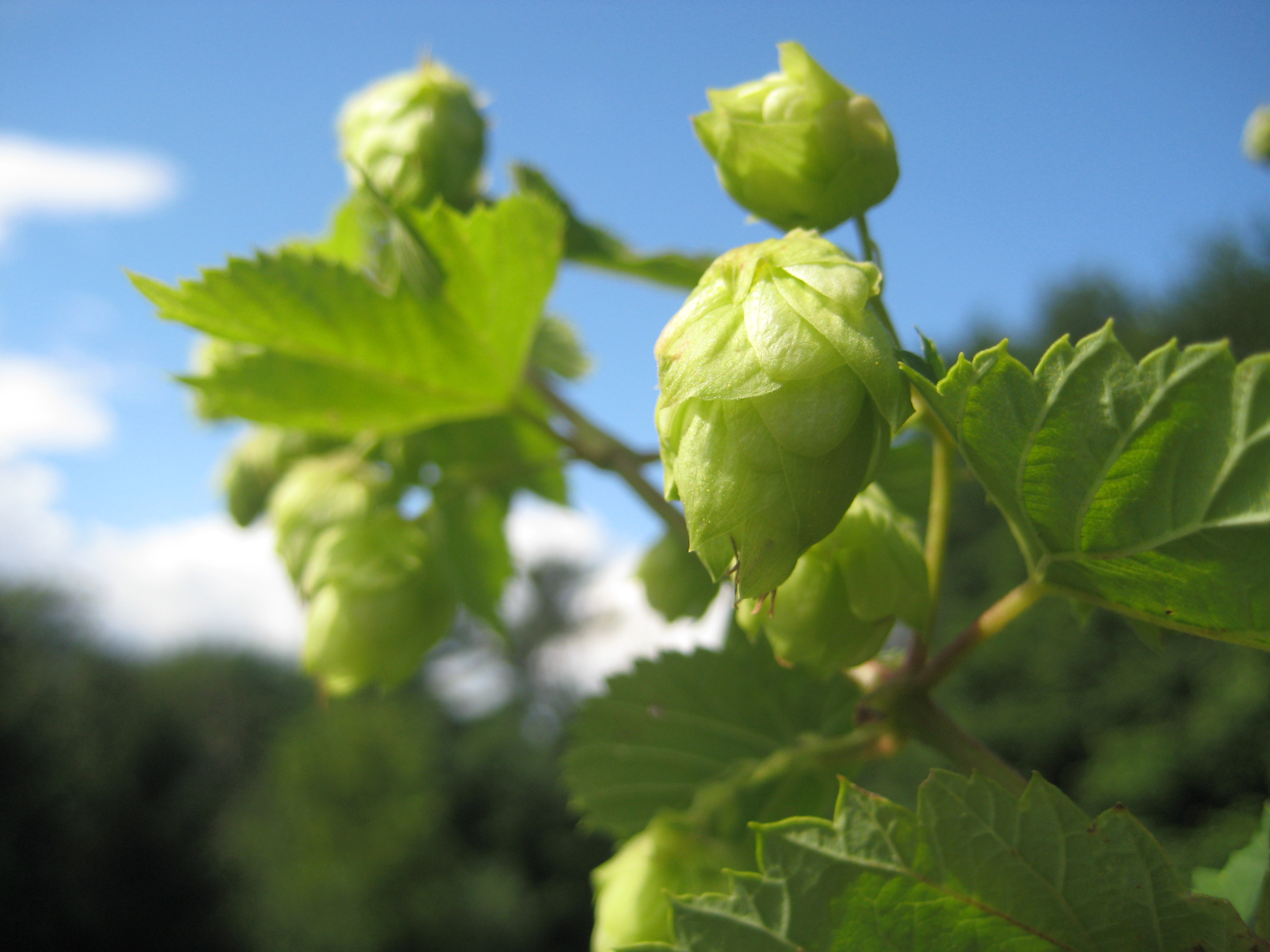
Cascade hop cones in the sunlight

Cascade is one of the many cultivars of hops. Cascade hops are one of the most widely used hops by craft breweries in the United States. Cascade was the most widely planted hop by growers in the US for many years, before being surpassed by Citra hops in 2018.

== History ==
Cascade is a cultivar of hops developed in the USDA breeding program at Oregon State University by Dr. Stanley Nelson Brooks and Jack Horner. Developed during the 1960s, it was released as an American aroma variety in 1971. It originated from an open seed collection in 1956, including English Fuggle, Russian Serebrianka, and an unspecified male hop variety. In addition to appealing flavor qualities, researchers were looking for resistance to downy mildew, a threat to hop yards. Cascade was named after the Cascade mountain range that runs through the states of Washington, Oregon, California and the Canadian province of British Columbia. The hop variety was first used commercially in 1975 by the Anchor Brewing Company, which established it as a signature hop for American pale ale. The plant is now grown in various places around the United States; British Columbia and Alberta, Canada; Argentina; and in Tasmania; Victoria and New South Wales, Australia.

== Characteristics ==
A visual characteristic of the plant is its dark green elongated cones which contain moderate to somewhat high amounts of alpha acids compared to many other hop types. The resultant aroma is of medium strength and very distinct. It has a pleasant, flowery and spicy, citrus-like quality with a slight grapefruit characteristic. The hop is good for both flavor and aroma uses. It can also be used for bittering effectively, and can be used to make any ales, and indeed is characteristic of American pale ales, such as the classic Sierra Nevada. It is also used in some lagers, for example Sam Adams '76.

== Australian/Tasmanian variety ==
A variety of Cascade has been propagated in Tasmania, Australia. It has similar resultant characteristics to the US variety. The Tasmanian variety contains less myrcene oil and more humulene oil as well as other smaller differences.

== New Zealand variety ==
A variety of Cascade is also bred in New Zealand. Similarities exist between the US and New Zealand varieties with the NZ version described as citrus moving more toward grapefruit characteristics. Agronomic and terroir impact has been described as positive for the New Zealand type. As of August 2016 Cascade grown in New Zealand is now referred to as Taiheke.

== Acid and oil breakdown ==
Property	Tasmanian variety	American variety
Yield (kg/ha)	1,700–2,200	1,792–2,240
Alpha acids (%)	4.5–7.0	
Beta acids (%)	4.8–7.0	
Alpha/beta ratio	0.9–1.0	
Cohumulone (% of alpha acids):	33–40	
Total oils (Mls. per 100 grams dried hops)	0.7–2.0	0.7–1.4
Myrcene (as % of total oils)	22–35	45–60
Caryophyllene (as % of total oils)	2.6–2.7	3.5–5.5
Humulene (as % of total oils)	21–24	8–13
Farnesene (as % of total oils)	7–9	3–7
Storage (% alpha acids remaining after 6 months storage at 20 °C)	48–52	
Possible substitutions	Centennial, Amarillo	
