= Bundesstraße 301 =

Federal highway in Germany

B 301
- Bundesstraße 301

Route information
- Length: 68 km (42 mi)

Location
- Country: Germany
- States: Bavaria

Highway system
- Roads in Germany; Autobahns; List; Federal; List; State; E-roads

The Bundesstraße 301 (abbr. B301) is a German federal highway in Bavaria, which leads in two parts from Abensberg to Fischerhäuser, a district of Ismaning.

== Route description ==
=== Northern section ===
The northern section begins at Abensberg and runs through the Hallertau via Mainburg to Freising. From Abensberg to Attenkirchen it is also called Deutsche Hopfenstraße (transl. German Hop Road). Because of the increasing traffic, among other things due to the connection of the Munich Airport, a five kilometers long bypass around Au in der Hallertau was built and released for traffic in December 2011. With the rededication of the B11 between Munich and Moosburg to the State Road 2350, the part of the B11 between the previous end of the B301 and Marzling, and the feeder road (previously B11a) was rededicated to B301, so that the route ends at the exit Freising-Ost since then.

=== Southern section ===
The section south of Freising exists since 2013 and is also referred as Isarparallele. The main road begins at the junction Freising-Mitte on the A92 and ends in Fischerhäuser on the B388. It complements the road links of the airport and was the upgraded former county road FS44 (A 92-Hallbergmoos) and a 7.2-kilometre-long (4.5 mi) new line which was built between 31 August 2009 and the traffic release on 30 July 2013 at a cost of around 29 million euros. The newly built route between Fischerhäuser and Goldach runs directly next to the tracks of the Munich East–Munich Airport railway. In the area of the junction to the airport shuttle from the A92, the main road next to this railway line also crosses the Neufahrner Spange which leads to the Munich–Regensburg railway.

=== Traffic volume ===
For 2020, a traffic load of 20,000 vehicles per day is forecast for this section.

== Future ==
=== North-East bypass Freising (Nord-Ost-Umfahrung Freising) ===
For the almost four-kilometre-long (2.5 mi) bypass of Freising is already a plan approval decision before and the first construction work has begun. The route is to branch off at Erlau from the existing road and meet at Marzling on the State Road 2350 (former B11) and the above-described motorway feeder.

=== Federal Transport Infrastructure Plan 2030 (Bundesverkehrswegeplan 2030) ===
The first draft bill as part of the preparation of the FTIP 2030 was made public on 16 March 2016. The publication of the draft bill was followed by a six-week public participation. After evaluating the comments received, a revised cabinet draft was available, in which the bypass around Mainburg was included in the urgent need. After the referendum at the end of July 2016, the Federal Cabinet approved the plan on 3 August 2016.
