= Erlau (disambiguation) =

Erlau is a municipality in the district of Mittelsachsen in Saxony in Germany.

Erlau may also refer to:

- Erlau (Freising), a district of Freising, Bavaria, Germany
- Erlau (river), a river of Bavaria, Germany
- Erlau (Hasidic dynasty), a Haredi dynasty of Hungarian origin
- Eger (German: Erlau), a city in Hungary
