= List of hop varieties =

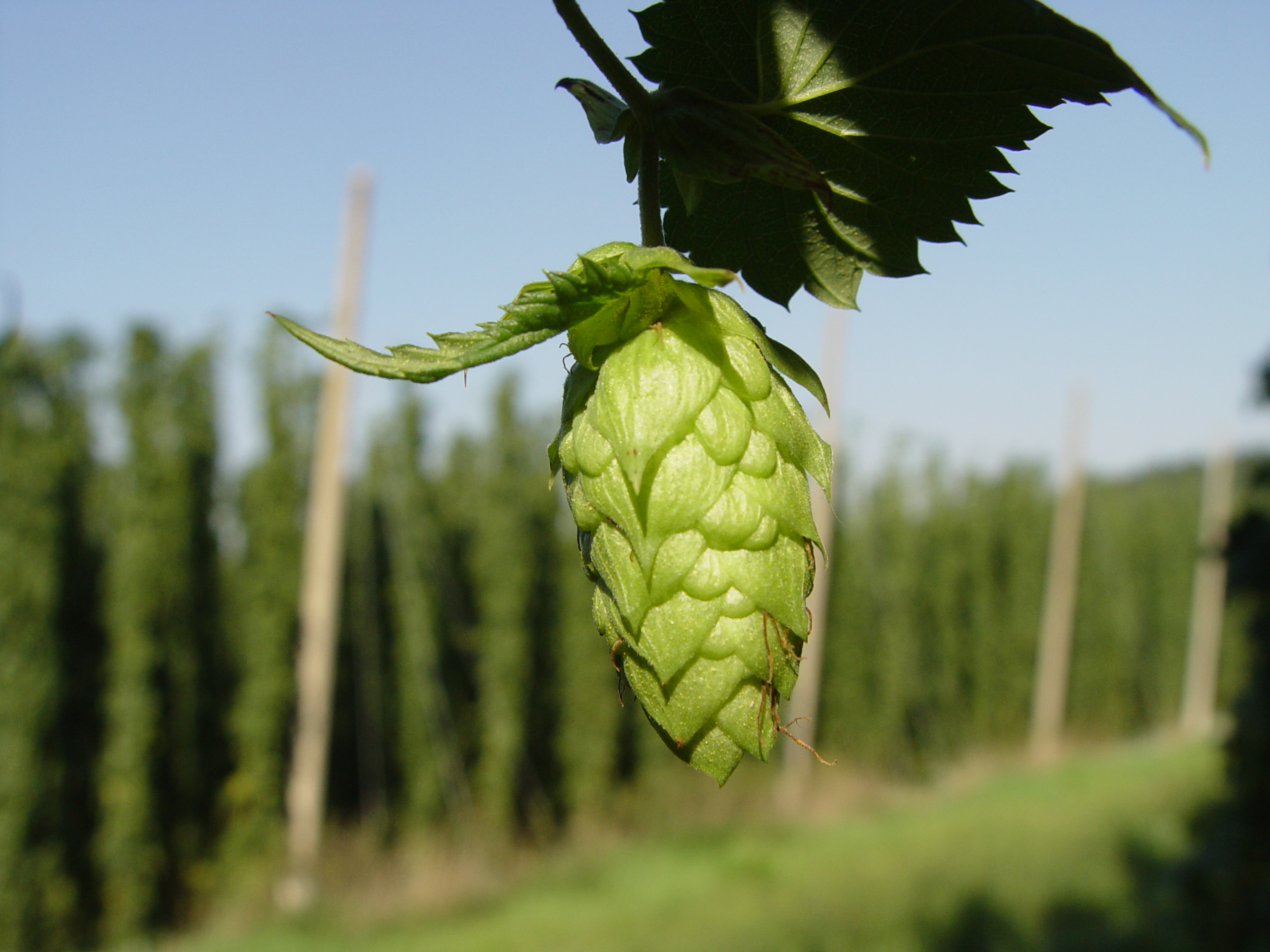
Hallertau hop cone

This is a list of varieties of hop (Humulus lupulus).

As there are male and female plants, the flowers (cones) of the female plant are fertilized by the pollen of the male flowers with the result that the female flowers form seeds. These seeds are eaten by birds and hence spread over vast distances. Hops, specifically their female plants, have been grown as a commercial crop for the brewing industry for many centuries in many countries. The first documented mention of a hop garden is in the will of Pepyn III. The first breeding of different hop varieties took place at Wye College in Kent, England by E. S. Salmon in 1919 when he bred the varieties "Brewer's Gold" and "Bullion". As of 2012, there are around 80 varieties in commercial use around the world, and considerably more in development/trials.

== American ==
=== Ahtanum brand YCR 1 cv ===
Ahtanum brand YCR 1 cv is an aroma-type cultivar bred by Yakima Chief Ranches. It is used for its aromatic properties and moderate bittering. It has unique aromas that include citrus (grapefruit), earthy, and floral. The variety is named after the location where Charles Carpenter established the first hop farm in the Yakima Valley in 1869. Typical alpha acids range from 5–7%, and beta acids range from 5–6%. Typical total oils (Mls. per 100 grams dried hops) 0.8–1.2.

=== Amarillo brand VGXP01 cv ===
Popular American mid-range alpha acid variety with a unique and distinct aroma discovered growing "wild" (spontaneously) in one of their hop yards and developed by Virgil Gamache Farms in the late 20th century. Also known as VGXP01, and named in honor of Virgil Gamache the patriarch of the family.

=== Apollo ===
Characterized by its exceptionally high percentage of alpha acids (15.0 – 19.0%), excellent storage stability of alpha acids, low CoH (cohumulone) value for an alpha variety, and resistance to hop powdery mildew strains found in Washington. It was the result of a cross in 2000 at Golden Gate Roza Hop Ranches in Prosser, Washington, and has been asexually reproduced there.

Alpha acids: 15–19% (ASBC spectrophotometric method)

Beta acids: 5.5–8% (ASBC spectrophotometric method)

Alpha/beta ratio: 3.0–3.5

Cohumulone (% of alpha-acids): 24–28%

Colupulone (% of beta-acids): 52%

Total oils (ml/100 g): 1.5–2.5

Humulene (% of total oils): 20–35%

=== Azacca ===
Azacca has predominantly citrus and tropical fruit notes, consisting of mango, papaya, orange, grapefruit, lemon, piney, spicy, pineapple, grassy, tropical fruit, citrus aromas. Named after the Haitian god of agriculture, Azacca. Alpha: 14–16%; Beta: 4.0–5.5%

=== Calypso ===
Dual-purpose high alpha hop with aromas of pear, apple and earthy tea.

=== Cascade ===
A well-established American aroma hop developed by USDA-ARS's breeding program in 1956 from combining Fuggle and Serebrianka (a Russian variety), but not released for cultivation until 1972. It has a flowery and spicy, citrus-like quality with a slight grapefruit characteristic. One of the "Three Cs" along with Centennial and Columbus. Substitutes: Centennial and Columbus (however, both contain a higher Alpha Acid content).

=== Centennial ===
American aroma-type variety bred in 1974 and released in September 1990 by S.T. Kenny and C.E. Zimmermann, the breeders of this variety. Similar to Cascade and Chinook. The genetic composition is 3/4 Brewers Gold, 3/32 Fuggle, 1/6 Golding, 1/32 Bavarian and 1/16 Unknown. One of the "Three Cs" along with Cascade and Columbus. Centennial is often referred to as a 'Super Cascade', since it has a strong citrus aroma.

=== Chinook ===
Released in 1985. It is the cross of USDA 63102M (Note: In USDA nomenclature, the "M" in USDA 63102M (and similar named hops) stands for "male".) and Petham Golding, (Note: It was previously thought that Golding was the mother.) with the aforementioned being a cross from Brewer's Gold and a wild male from Utah.

=== Citra brand HBC 394 cv ===
Citra Brand is a registered trademark used with HBC 394 cv special aroma hop variety developed by the Hop Breeding Company (a joint venture between John I. Haas, Inc. and Select Botanicals Group, LLC). The hop was first crossed in 1990, then assigned the name X-114. Its grandmother is Hallertau Mittelfrüh. (Note: Citra is "50 percent Mittelfrüh, 25 percent U.S. Tettnanger, 19 percent Brewer's Gold, 3 percent East Kent Golding and 3 percent unknown [...]." The hops that were crossed to make Citra was a female and male plant resulting from the same cross of a female Hallertau Mittelfrüh and a male. The male was crossed from U.S. Tettnanger and USDA 63015.) Various breweries tested the hop before Sierra Nevada, Deschutes, and Widmer Brothers became interested and financed more acreage. It was released in 2007. Citra Brand hops have fairly high alpha acids and total oil contents with a low percentage of cohumulone content. Citra Brand hops imparts citrus (grapefruit) and tropical fruit characters to beer.

=== Cluster ===
Originated from mass selection of the Cluster hop, which is an old American cultivar. It is suggested that they arose from hybridization of varieties, imported by Dutch and English settlers and indigenous male hops. There is an early ripening and a late ripening Cluster cultivar. Also known as Golden Cluster. They can give a blackcurrant aroma/flavor. Substitutes: Brewer's Gold.

=== Columbus ===
A high yielding, high alpha acid American bittering hop. Also known by the trade name Tomahawk. One of the "Three Cs" along with Cascade and Centennial. Like the others it is citrusy and slightly woody. Columbus has a very high amount of total oils, and can impart a 'resiny' quality to a beer. Substitutes for bittering: Nugget, Chinook. Substitutes for aroma and flavor: Cascade, Centennial.

=== Comet ===
A rare US grown hop, originally bred for its bittering characteristics. Said to have character similar to wild American hops that are "objectionable to some brewers".

=== Crystal ===
An American triploid variety developed in 1993 from Hallertau, Cascade, Brewer's Gold and Early Green. It is spicier than Hallertau (cinnamon, black pepper, and nutmeg). Substitutes: any Hallertau variety, Mount Hood, Liberty.

=== El Dorado ===
Developed by CLS Farms and formally released in the fall of 2010. High alpha with tropical fruit flavors.

=== Ekuanot ===
Developed by the Hop Breeding Company and released in 2014. A high oil content hop known for strong aroma including fruitiness, eucalyptus, clove, and tobacco. Formerly known as Equinox. 14.5 - 15.5% Alpha acids.

=== Eroica ===
This cultivar with its pale green bine was bred in 1968 with its sister Galena from Brewers Gold with an open pollination. It was released in 1979 in Idaho, one of the three hop cultivation areas on America's West Coast It is strongly "catty" flavored bittering hop with an alpha acid content ranging from 10–13% and used often in wheat beers. Substitutes: Galena, Nugget, Olympic.

=== Fulcrum ===
Fulcrum is a Midwest grown hop with a light citrus profile. Moderate alpha acids, total oils and lower cohumulone content. potentially a Citra or Centennial crossed with a Fuggle hop to grow more reliably, resulting in a citrus beer with a less intense finish. Breweries like Founders, Bell's, and Three Floyd's are rumored to have used a Midwestern grown version of the Citra hop. Evidence suggests Fulcrum is likely only an urban legend. More likely, it is the Citra or combinations creating the effect.

=== Galena ===
A cultivar developed in 1968 from Brewer's Gold by open pollination in Idaho. An open pollination means that the male hop is unknown. The alpha acid content is relatively high—11.5 to 13.5%—but its co-humulone content and its beta acid range are also high.

=== Glacier ===
Low-cohumulone American Fuggle descendant. Substitutes: Eroica, Nugget, Olympic.

=== Greensburg ===
American Hop grown in southern Idaho.

=== Horizon ===
American high alpha cross made in Oregon in 1970. Horizon and Nugget share a common parent (#65009).

=== Liberty ===
American 1983 cross between Hallertauer Mittelfrüh (USDA 21397) and downy mildew resistant male (USDA 64035M). Spicy (cinnamon), resiny, and slightly sweet. It is an early ripening variety and similar in technical data and aroma to Hallertau Mittelfrueh. Recommended for German/American lagers. Alpha acids are relatively low at 2-6%. Substitutes: Mount Hood, Hallertau, Crystal.

=== Mount Hood ===
Soft American variety developed from Hallertau. Frequently used in styles that require only a subtle hop aroma (German/American lagers). Named for Mount Hood in Oregon. Substitutes: Liberty, Hallertau, Crystal.

=== Mount Rainier ===
Originally cultivated in Oregon. Mount Rainier has a complex parentage, including Hallertau, Galena, Fuggle and other hops, and exhibits some noble hop characteristics, but is higher in alpha acid. The aroma is reminiscent of licorice with a hint of citrus.

=== Mosaic brand HBC 369 cv ===
Mosaic™ Brand HBC 369 cv is a daughter of the YCR 14 cv hop variety and a Nugget derived male. It has high alpha acids and tropical, blueberry, tangerine, floral, and earthy aromas.

=== Newport ===
Recently developed American high-alpha bittering hop.

=== Nugget ===
Floral, resiny aroma and flavor, primarily used as a bittering hop. It was crossed from the male hop USDA 63015 and female USDA 65009. Substitutes: Galena, Olympic.

=== Palisade brand YCR 4 cv ===
Palisade brand YCR 4 hop variety is an aroma hop that is known for its amazing yield and unique aroma. It invokes apricot, grass, and floral notes and is used regularly in commercial brewing.

=== San Juan Ruby Red ===
Discovered growing wild in the San Juan Mountains of Colorado. Open pollinated hops. Aroma is fruity and slightly sweet. A newly developed American aroma hop that contains noble hop characteristics.

=== Santiam ===
American floral aroma hop with mid-range alpha acid. Pedigree includes Tettnang (mother), Hallertau Mittelfrüh (grandmother) and Cascade (great grandmother). Named for the Santiam River in Oregon.

=== Satus ===
A bittering-type cultivar of recent origin, produced by Yakima Chief Ranches in Washington State.

=== Simcoe brand YCR 14 cv ===
According to the breeder, creator of this hop variety, ″[i]n 2000, Select Botanicals Group released the Simcoe brand YCR 14 hop variety which is an aroma variety known for its versatility and unique characteristics. Simcoe brand hops boasts several different aromas including passion fruit, pine, earthy, and citrus, and also has strong bittering qualities with an alpha acid level of 12–14%. It is used extensively in the craft and home brewing industry.″

=== Sonnet Golding ===
Low alpha American-grown Golding variety.

=== Sterling ===
American floral hop released in 1998. A cross between Saaz and Mount Hood in character but easier to grow.

=== Summit ===
Useful for barleywines, stouts and IPAs. Alpha acids 17–19%, Beta acids 4.0–6.0%. Often provides tangerine flavors and aromas when added late in the boil. Trademarked.

=== Tomahawk ===
Trade name for Columbus.

=== Ultra ===
A triploid aroma-type cultivar, originated in 1983 from a cross between the colchicine-induced tetraploid Hallertau mf (USDA 21397) and the diploid Saazer-derived male genotype (USDA 21237m). Ultra is the half-sister to Mount Hood, Liberty and Crystal. Its genetic composition is 4/6 Hallertau mf, 1/6 Saazer, and 1/6 unknown. This cultivar was released for commercial production in March, 1995. It has a peppery, spicy aroma similar to Saaz. Substitutes: Crystal, Saaz, Tettnanger.

=== Vanguard ===
American aroma cross developed from Hallertau in 1982, with a sweet, slightly spicy aroma and flavor. A granddaughter of Hallertau Mittlefruh, it has all the Hallertau characteristics one would expect. Typical beer styles: Lager, Pilsner, Bock, Kolsch, Wheat Beers, Munich Helles, Belgian-Style Ales.

=== Warrior brand YCR 5 cv ===
Warrior brand YCR 5 cv hop variety is an alpha hop used for its mild, clean bittering qualities. It is widely used in American pale ales and IPAs.

=== Willamette ===
Popular American development in 1976 of the English Fuggle. Named for the Willamette Valley, an important hop-growing area. It has a character similar to Fuggle, but is more fruity and has some floral notes. Used in British and American ales. A recent taste-test comparison between Ahtanum and Willamette has described some similarity between the varieties.

=== Zeus ===
American aromatic high-alpha hop. Similar, if not identical, to Columbus/Tomahawk. Columbus/Tomahawk/Zeus hops are sometimes referred to as "CTZ hops."

=== Zythos ===
Actually a blend of American hops, specifically designed by Hop Union for American Pale Ale (APA) and India Pale Ale (IPA) style beers. Reportedly a blend of Simcoe, Citra, Palisade and Amarillo, it has distinct tropical (pineapple) and citrus tones, with slight pine characteristics.

== British ==
=== Admiral ===
A high-alpha hop used mostly for bittering but can give a mild orange flavour as a late hop. Substitutes: Target, Northdown, Challenger.

=== Archer ===
Archer is a low trellis, wilt resistant hop variety. Tolerant to powdery mildew. The Spring growth needs holding back to avoid the variety becoming vigorous and leafy. Archer is a registered trade mark of Charles Faram & Co Ltd] and was released commercially by the Charles Faram Hop Development Programme in 2013. Its alpha acid ranges from 4-6%.

=== Beata ===
Hedgerow variety bred at Wye in 1995, primarily for a high beta acid content (9-11%).

=== Boadicea ===
A spicy, light, floral hop suitable for finishing and dry hopping. Released by Horticulture Research International in 2004, having been bred to be resistant to aphids and require fewer pesticides than other hops.

=== Bramling Cross ===
Dual Purpose Hop developed in 1951 by Professor Salmon at Wye College, England. A cross between the Bramling Goldings variety and a wild Canadian Manitoban hop.

=== Brewer's Gold ===
British bittering hop developed in 1919. Both Brewer's Gold and Bullion are seedlings of BB1 (found wild in Manitoba). Many modern high alpha hops were developed from Brewer's Gold. Has a resiny, spicy aroma/flavor with hints of black currant. Substitutions: Northdown.

=== Bullion ===
Bittering hop. One of the earliest high alpha hops in the world. Raised in 1919 at Wye College from a wild Manitoban female crossed with an English male hop. Mainly bittering Stouts and Dark ales. This hop has a resiny/earthy aroma/flavor and can be a bit rough. Substitutions: Northern Brewer and Galena.

=== Challenger ===
English hop. Introduced in 1972. Very popular dual-purpose hop in English ales. Used in many traditional English Bitters. When used for bittering, Challenger can impart a pleasant and complex marmalade/toffee/citrus flavour, which enhances strong ales. Substitutes: East Kent Goldings, Phoenix, Styrian Goldings, British Columbian Goldings.

=== Endeavour ===
Hedgerow variety bred at Wye from Cascade, with citrus and blackcurrant flavours

=== Epic ===
Found in 1987 as a chance seedling in a hedge adjacent to a hop field at Bourne Farm, Sandhurst, Kent - probably a seedling of Alliance.

=== Ernest ===
Bred by Ernest Salmon at Wye in 1921, OZ97a was initially rejected for having an aroma that was "too American", saw interest revive in the 1950s as it is wilt resistant, but was again rejected and was not named until 2016, by which time American flavours were very much in fashion.

=== First Gold ===
The first English commercial grown dwarf hop, released in 1995 and bred by Wye College in Kent. A cross-pollination of Whitbread Golding Variety (WGV) and a dwarf male. Its aroma resembles a mixture of Goldings and Challenger hops . The alpha acid content ranges from 6.5% to 8.5%. Substitutes: A mix of East Kent Goldings and Crystal (for the cinnamon).

=== Fuggle ===
Classic English aroma hop which is a parent of Styrian Goldings and of many New World hops such as Cascade, Centennial and Willamette. This variety was noticed growing "wild" in the hop garden of George Stace Moore's house at Horsmonden in Kent, England in 1861. In 1875 it was commercialised by Richard Fuggle who lived in the village of Brenchley (not far from Horsmonden) and hence it was called Fuggle. The aroma is earthier and less sweet than Goldings. Substitutes: Willamette.

=== Goldings ===
The quintessential English hop, Goldings is a group of related clones that harvest at different times such as Cobbs, Amos’ Early Bird, Eastwell, Mathon, East Kent and historical clones such as Bramling, Canterbury, Rodmersham and Petham. However Whitbread Golding Variety (WGV, see below) is at best a relative of this group and Styrian Goldings is a descendant of Fuggle, unrelated to other hops with the name Golding. East Kent Goldings (EKG) have been sold as such since 1838 and are the only hop enjoy Protected Designation of Origin status. To qualify for the designation they must be grown in a designated area of East Kent and conform to a standard chemical "fingerprint". The terroir of East Kent is particularly suited to hop growing, with brick clay over chalk and cold, salt-laden winds off the North Sea. "Kent Goldings" come from elsewhere in Kent.

Goldings are used for bittering and late hopping, particularly in combination with Fuggle. They are known for a smooth, sweet bitterness with spicy and earthy aromas. Typically they have 4–9.5% alpha acids, 0.4–0.8% total oils and negligible farnesene. The family is first reported in the 1750s as the Farnham Whitebine of Surrey which gave rise to the Canterbury Whitebine, one of which was selected by a Mr Golding in the 1790s. Goldings are tall, low yielding and susceptible to powdery mildew, downy mildew and Verticillium wilt – much of the research at Wye College has been driven by the need to improve these traits.

=== Herald ===
An English aroma and bittering hop; sister of Pioneer. Substitutes: Pioneer.

=== Northdown ===
Dual purpose hop in England developed in the 1970s. Relative of Challenger and Target. Very resiny. Substitutes: Phoenix or blend of Goldings and Brewers Gold.

=== Northern Brewer ===
Northern Brewer (WFB135) is notable as one of the first varieties to have alpha acids as high as 9-10%, and played a large part in hop breeding throughout the 20th century. It was bred by Ernest Salmon at Wye College in 1934 from a cross between a Canterbury Golding female plant and the male plant OB21, which in turn came from a 1929 cross between Brewer's Gold and OY1, a wild male hop from Russian River, California. Grown in Europe and America as a dual-purpose hop, but mainly used for bittering in combination with other hops. Woody/earthy/fruity aroma and flavor. Substitutes: Hallertau, Pride of Ringwood, Bullion.

=== Olicana ===
Olicana is a registered trade mark of Charles Faram & Co Ltd and is from the Charles Faram Hop Development Programme. A sister of Jester, Olicana is more leafy, taller and vigorous. This hop variety was planted in 2009 in Herefordshire/Worcestershire and released commercially by Charles Faram & Co Ltd in 2014. It was not originally selected to be further developed in the programme as it was Powdery Mildew susceptible like Challenger, however Olicana is more tolerant.

The hop was trialled by Mark Andrews of Townend Farm, Herefordshire and is now commercially grown by Townend Farm and Stocks Farm, Worcestershire. Olicana was found to be best in its class and highly resistant to Wilt. It shoots very late with thin cuttings and can restrict propagation. Its alpha acid range is 7-9%

=== Phoenix ===
Dual-purpose English hop, mild aroma and slightly spicy flavor. Substitutes: Challenger.

=== Pilgrim ===
Bred at the Horticulture Research International in Wye, England. Released 2000. Dual purpose with lemon tones.

=== Pilot ===
Previously known as S24 (nicknamed Ros) this UK hedgerow variety was officially named as 'Pilot' in May 2002 by Charles Faram & Co Ltd. The variety is wilt resistant, has good aroma and alpha properties and yields well.

=== Pioneer ===
English hop; a sister of Herald. Distinct bitter lemon flavour. Substitutes: East Kent Goldings, Herald.

=== Progress ===
Higher alpha English hop developed in the 1960s as a replacement for Fuggle. Often used with Goldings.

=== Target ===
English mid-to-high alpha hop bred from Kent Goldings.

=== Whitbread Golding Variety (WGV) ===
Bred by Edward Albert White of Yalding, Kent, England in 1911 from open pollination of Bates Brewer. It acquired the name Whitbread Golding after the brewery bought the farms in 1920 when Mr White retired. Whitbread did not acknowledge the work Mr White had achieved in hop cultivation by keeping his name. It is not a true Golding but also not dissimilar it is more robust with distinguishing sweet fruity note.

== German ==
=== Hallertauer Magnum ===
A high alpha acid type cultivar with mild flavor and low aromatic characteristics, bred in 1980 at the Hop Research Center Hüll. It was bred from the American variety Galena with a German male hop (75/5/3). It seems to contribute to a smooth bitterness combined with a good aroma. 11.0 to 16.0% alpha acid. This variety is also cultivated in the U.S.

=== Hallertauer Merkur ===
A product of the Hop Research Center Hüll in the Hallertau region of Germany. Bred from a cross between Hallertaur Magnum and variety 81/8/13. Mainly a bittering hop, but can provide an earthy, citrusy aroma.

=== Hallertauer Taurus ===
High to super-high alpha bittering hop. Bred at the Hop Research Center Hüll in Germany.

=== Hallertauer Tradition ===
Bred in 1991 from Hallertau Mittelfrüh by the Hop Research Center Hüll in Germany for resistance to disease. Grassy like Hallertau, but easier to grow.

=== Herkules ===
Cross between Hallertauer Taurus and a powdery mildew resistant Hüll male breeding line. High alpha bittering hop. Released 2005.

=== Huell Melon ===
Aroma hop variety featuring fruity honeydew melon and apricot aroma. Alpha acids 7–8%, beta acids 7–8%, cohumulone 25–30%, polyphenols 3%. Very high concentration of limonene. Bred at the Hop Research Center Hüll in Germany from a cross between Cascade and the Hüll male breeding line 2004/026/007 (94/045/001 × wild PM resistant male). One of the four Hüll “Special Flavor Hops” registered to the European Community Plant Variety Office in 2012.

=== Mandarina Bavaria ===
Aroma hop variety featuring fruity mandarin orange and citrus aroma. Alpha acids 7–10%, beta acids 4–7%, cohumulone 28–35%. Very high geraniol concentration. The most aroma-active compounds are myrcene and linalool. Bred in 2007 at the Hop Research Center Hüll in Germany from a cross between Cascade and the Hüll male breeding line 2004/026/007 (94/045/001 × wild PM resistant male). One of the four new Hüll “Special Flavor Hops” registered to the European Community Plant Variety Office in 2012.

=== Opal ===
A product of the Hop Research Center Hüll that exhibits aroma characteristics combined with a respectable alpha acid level. Exhibits a sweet spice, slightly peppery aroma and flavor combined with a light, clean citrus fruit aroma.

=== Perle ===
German dual-purpose hop. Often used in combination with other hops. Spicy and slightly floral/fruity. Substitutes: Hallertau, Mount Hood, Liberty.

=== Polaris ===
Aroma hop variety with high bittering potential and fruity/spicy, fresh aroma reminiscent of mint and menthol. High alpha acid content of 18–23%, beta acids 5–6.5%, cohumulone 22–29%, humulene 20–35%, polyphenols 2.6–2.7%. Very high total oil content of up to 5 ml per 100 g of hops. High content of the esters isobutyl isobutyrate, 2-methylbutyl isobutyrate, methyl heptanoate, methyl octanoate, methyl 4-decenoate, methyl 4,8-decadienoate, and geranyl acetate, as well as the monoterpene (E)-beta-ocimene. Polaris was bred at the Hop Research Center Hüll in Germany already in 1999 but was released in 2012, when it was registered to the European Community Plant Variety Office as one of four Hüll “Special Flavor Hops”. It is derived from Hüll breeding lines, a Japanese breeding line, and the American Nugget hop variety, and was bred with the stated aim to increase alpha acid content.

=== Saphir ===
Saphir is a new breed of hop that has partially replaced the Hallertauer Mittelfrüh variety, due to the latters susceptibility to disease and pests. It shares many of the Hallertauer Mittelfrüh characteristics and is well suited as an aroma hop.

=== Smaragd ===
Mid-alpha hop with fruity, floral characteristics.

=== Spalter Select ===
German disease-resistant Hallertauer and Spalt pale lager variety developed in the early 1990s.

== Noble ==
=== Hallertau ===
Hallertauer Mittelfrüh. The original German lager hop; named after Hallertau or Holledau region in central Bavaria. Due to susceptibility to crop disease, it was largely replaced by Hersbrucker in the 1970s and 1980s. Substitutes: Mount Hood, Liberty.

=== Hersbrucker ===
Noble hop used in German pale lagers. Substitutes: Hallertau, Mount Hood, Liberty, Spalt.

=== Saaz ===
Named after the city of Saaz (now Žatec) in the Czech Republic. Noble hop used extensively to flavor pale Czech lagers such as Pilsner Urquell. Cinnamon-spicy, earthy. Substitutes: Tettnanger, Ultra, Crystal.

=== Tettnanger ===
Noble German dual use hop used in European pale lagers and wheat beers, sometimes with Hallertau. Comes from Tettnang, a small town in southern Baden-Württemberg in Germany. The region produces significant quantities of hops, and ships them to breweries throughout the world. Substitutes: Saaz, Crystal.

=== Spalt ===
Traditional German noble hop from the Spalter region south of Nuremberg. Woody. Substitutes: Hallertau varieties.

== Australian ==
=== Ella ===
Formerly Stella. Name changed July 2012 due to legal pressure from Stella Artois. Australian high alpha variety. When used in modest amounts, it is reminiscent of noble European varieties, contributing floral notes. Larger quantities are more fruity, with a hint of anise. Alpha acids 13–16%. Typical total oils (ml per 100g) 2.4–3.4. Breeding code 01-220-060.

=== Enigma ===
An Australian high alpha variety typically 16–19%. A decedent of the Swiss Tettnang hop Enigma has a white grape and tropic fruit flavour profile.

=== Feux-Coeur Francais ===
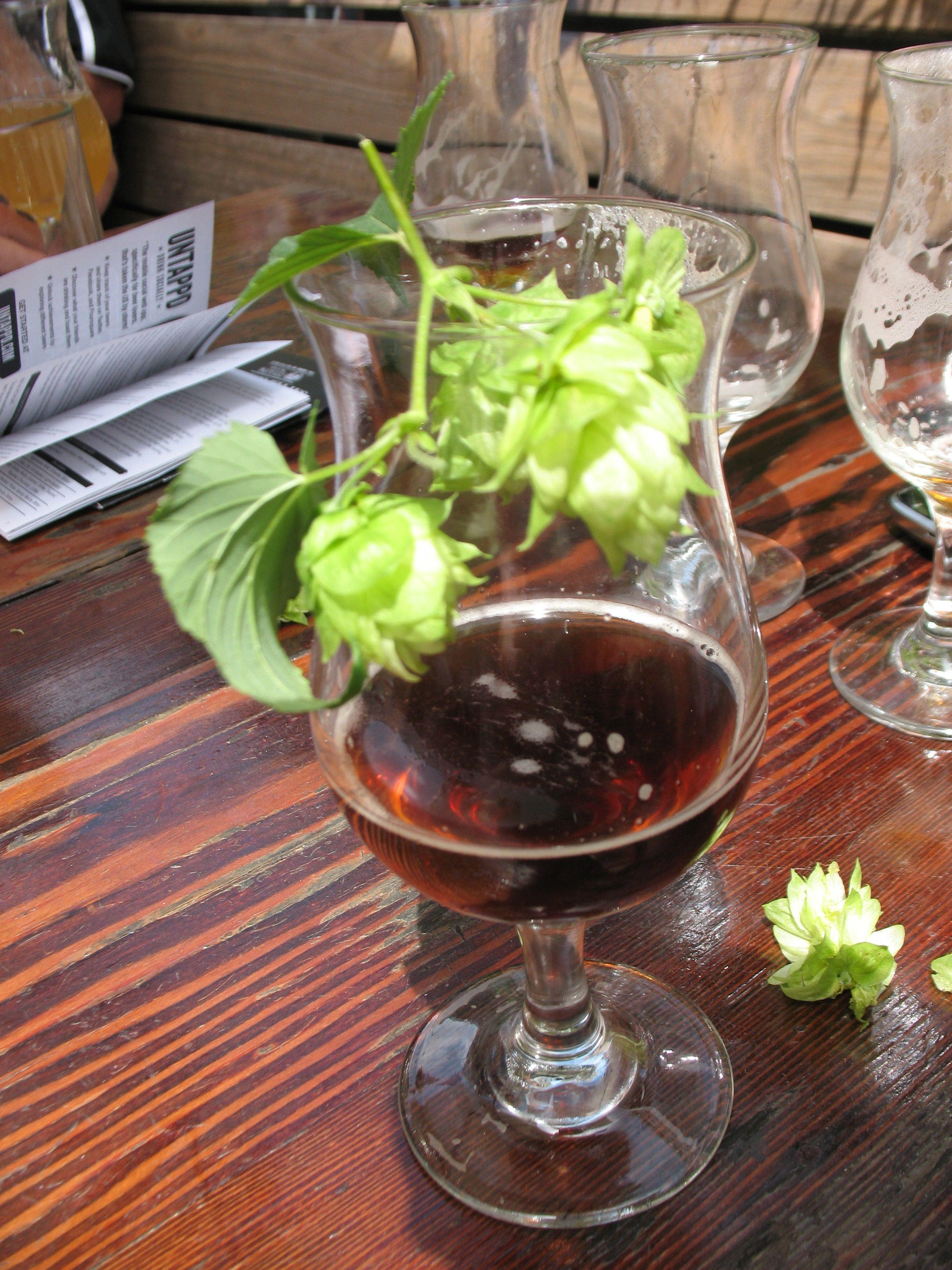
Feux-Coeur hops in a beer glass

A rare Australian hop variety that has its genetic roots in the Burgundy region of France. It has been specially adapted to grow in the cool climate of Victoria (Australia). It was first harvested in 2010 and is ideal for use in a Randall device as invented by Dogfish Head Brewery. The alpha values on this young variety come in between 12 and 16. The name is a double entendre when pronounced quickly.

=== Galaxy ===
Australian high alpha dual purpose triploid cultivar with a marked and unique hop aroma, described as a combination of citrus and passionfruit. The initial aromas and flavors are quite intense, but these moderate as the beer matures. Bred in 1994 by Hop Products Australia by crossing a female tetraploid (J78) with a male derived from Perle. Alpha acids 11–16%. Typical total oils (ml per 100g) 3.0–5.0, which is the highest known. Breeding code 94-203-008.

=== Pride of Ringwood ===
Used by Australian brewer Carlton & United Breweries to bitter all of its beers. The hop was created in 1953 at CUB's research facility in the Melbourne suburb of Ringwood, using open pollination of Pride of Kent females. Little historical information has been released by CUB on their web site. It is unique in being the only hop developed by one brewery, and used predominantly by that brewery. CUB's flagship beer Victoria Bitter changed from a red ale to a lager in the mid 1950s, and PoR is likely to have been the hop used for production. The hop has a strong aroma, and an earthy-citrus flavor, for late boil additions. Initial additions yield a clean bitterness. Green hopping is reported to produce good results. The hop does not have a long shelf life. However, the variety is highly resistant to diseases, and it has little inter-annual variation. Commercial harvests are now mostly Super Pride. Substitutes: Pacific Gem, Cluster, Northern Brewer.

=== Summer ===
Low alpha Australian aroma variety. Provides distinctive light apricot and melon fruit notes. Breeding code 97-235-026.

=== Super Pride ===
A high alpha version of Pride of Ringwood, bred in 1987 by Hop Products Australia at their Rostrevor Breeding Garden Victoria. This cultivar was bred by crossing a female tetraploid Pride of Ringwood with a male YK¬81¬18.

=== Topaz ===
High alpha Australian variety. Topaz is a triploid high alpha acid type cultivar bred by Hop Products Australia at their Rostrevor Breeding Garden Victoria. This variety was bred in 1985 by crossing a female Tetraploid J78 with a male 29/70/54. Provides earthy notes comparable to old English varieties. Breeding Code TC-85-70.

=== Vic Secret ===
First commercial crop released in 2013, by Hop Products Australia. When used as a late kettle addition, the flavour is earthy with little fruit. Post boil addition yields pine and fruit flavours. Alpha acids 14–17%. Typical total oils (ml per 100g) 2.2–2.8. Breeding code 00-207-013.

== New Zealand ==
=== Green Bullet ===
Released from the New Zealand DSIR (now HortResearch) in 1972, this triploid Alpha Variety was bred by open cross-pollination of the New Zealand "Smoothcone" variety. Known as a common New Zealand bittering hop, it also can contribute Styrian-like spiciness to late kettle additions.

=== Hallertau Aroma/Wakatu ===
Released commercially from Hort's Riwaka Research Centre in 1988. Developed as an Aroma variety by New Zealand's HortResearch Hop Breeding Programme. This triploid was bred from parentage of two-thirds Hallertau Mittlefrüh open pollinated by one third New Zealand-derived male. Aroma is floral with hints of lime zest.

=== Kohatu ===
A new mid-alpha variety with aromas of pine needles and tropical fruit.

=== Motueka ===
New variety NZ Hop, this hop was bred by crossing a New Zealand breeding selection (2/3) with Saazer parentage (1/3). Primarily used for flavour and aroma, its profile is citrus with lifted lemon and lime followed by a background of tropical fruit. Formerly known as B (Belgian) Saaz.

=== Nectaron ===
A triploid aroma type developed in collaboration with New Zealand's Plant & Food Research. Nectaron Brand HORT4337 is a full sister to Waimea. Over successive commercial brewing trials in styles such as Strong Pale Ales and India Pale Ales, Nectaron has displayed high levels of tropical fruit characters of pineapple and passionfruit as well as stone fruit (peach) and citrus (grapefruit). Alpha acids 10.5-11.5%.

=== Nelson Sauvin ===
A new variety developed in Nelson, New Zealand in 1987 and commercially available since 2000. Named in reference to the Sauvignon blanc grape. Has an intensely fruity flavour and aroma, with a strong suggestion of passionfruit. Effective for bittering, flavour and aroma. Good when used either solely or in combination with complementary fruity hops such as Cascade in American pale ales.

=== New Zealand Cascade ===
This hops origins stem from an early US breeding programme circa 1956 and was the first commercially bred hop to emerge from the USDA-ARS program when released in 1972. It was bred from crossing an English Fuggle with a male selection believed to have been a crossing of Fuggle with the Russian variety Serebrianka.

=== Pacifica ===
Released 1994 by New Zealand Hort Research Centre. Previously known as the Pacific Hallertau. It has a soft bittering quality. Its aroma is described as orange marmalade, citrus and some floral qualities.

=== Pacific Gem ===
A triploid Alpha type bred from the New Zealand variety "Smoothcone" crossed with Californian Late Cluster x Fuggle. Developed through the hop breeding programme of the New Zealand Horticultural Research Centre known now as HortResearch and released in 1987. Typically used as a bittering addition, but is known for producing oaken flavours with a distinct blackberry aroma when used as a late addition.

=== Pacific Jade ===
High alpha bittering hop from New Zealand with a soft bitterness. Aroma is described as fresh citrus and black pepper.

=== Rakau ===
A dual purpose variety typically with alpha acid above 10% and cohumulone less than 25% of alpha acids. Can be used for multiple additions with late hop character delivering tropical fruit aromas of passionfruit and peach. Quite high levels of oil with an H/C ratio typical of classical aroma varieties.

=== Riwaka ===
Released by HortResearch Riwaka Hop Research Centre in 1997. A triploid aroma type bred during the development of New Zealand hops "hops with a difference" program. Developed through crossing "Old Line" Saazer with specially developed New Zealand breeding selections. Known for a strong citrus character and high oil content.

=== Southern Cross ===
Mellow bittering hop with high alpha of 11.0–14.0%. The aroma is characterised by a heady mix of lemon peel and pine needles layered beneath a clean spiciness.

=== Sticklebract ===
A triploid variety developed at the DSIR Research Station from an open pollinated First Choice; a high alpha variety released in 1972. The aroma is pine and citrus. It is good for American-style IPAs and pale ales.

=== Super Alpha ===
This triploid variety was bred from the New Zealand Smoothcone variety cross open pollinated at the New Zealand Horticultural Research Centre (now known as HortResearch) and released in 1976. Most commonly a bittering hop, but contributes grassy notes if used as a late addition.

=== Wai-iti ===
New low-alpha variety with a strong citrus character of mandarin, lemon and lime zest. Alpha acids 3%. Total oils by dry weight 1.2ml per 100g.

=== Waimea ===
Released in 2012 from the New Zealand Plant and Food Research hop breeding program in Riwaka. Selected initially for alpha production Waimea is a granddaughter of Pacific Jade and commercialised on dual purpose capability. Typical alpha acids 16%. Oils by dry weight 2ml per 100g.

== European ==
=== Aalst ===
A Belgian variety mentioned for its use in Lambic beer in the early 19th century.

=== Aramis ===
French hop used for bittering and aroma. It is a cross between Strisselspalt and Whitbread Golding Variety.

=== Bor ===
A hybrid of Saaz and Northern Brewer. Gives a Saaz-like spicy aroma.

=== Coigneau ===
Belgian hop cultivated in the Aalst-Asse area near Brussels in the nineteenth and first half of the twentieth century. Because of the low bitterness the Coigneau was originally a favorite hop used for Lambic beer.

=== Iunga ===
A new variety from IUNG Puławy, made from variety Northern Brewer and Marynka. Primarily a bittering hop.

=== Lublin ===
Polish grown Saaz, used in Polish lagers. Slightly woody and spicy. Substitutes: Czech Saaz.

=== Marynka ===
Primarily a bittering hop, gives earthy, licorice qualities when used for aroma.

=== Poperinge ===
A Belgian variety mentioned for its use in Lambic beer in the early 19th century.

=== Premiant ===
A high-alpha Saaz variant. Gives similar spicy aroma qualities.

=== Sladek ===
A hybrid of Northern Brewer, Osvald's close No. 126 and Czech male components. Similar to Czech Saaz.

=== Strisselspalt ===
French aroma hop from Alsace, used mostly in pale lagers. Has a floral and lemony aroma/flavor. Similar to Hersbrucker. Substitutes: Hallertau, Mount Hood, Liberty, Hersbrucker, Southern Cross.

=== Styrian Atlas ===
A diploid hybrid between Brewers Gold and 3/3 Slovenian wild hop. Similar to other "Super Styrian" hops.

=== Styrian Aurora ===
Also known as Super Styrian, a diploid hybrid between Northern Brewer and a TG seedling of unknown origin. Similar in aroma to Styrian Golding.

=== Styrian Bobek ===
A delicate, spicy aroma hop, similar to Styrian Golding.

=== Styrian Celeia ===
A triploid hybrid between autotetraploid Styrian Golding and 105/58 hybrid between Aurora (Super Styrian) and a Slovenian wild hop. Gives a hoppy aroma similar to other "Super Styrian" varieties.

=== Styrian Golding ===
Slovenian variant of Fuggle, but similar to East Kent Goldings. Used in English ales and Belgian strong ales amongst others. From Slovenia.

=== Sybilla ===
A new variety from IUNG Puławy which is registered as a bittering hop, but has typical aroma characteristic. A mix of Lublin and Slovenian Styrian Golding.

=== Tardif de Bourgogne ===
French hop, used as an aromatic in continental lagers.

=== Tomyski ===
A Polish variety used as an aroma hop. This was used in the brewing of Grodziskie.

== Japan ==
=== Sorachi Ace ===
Japanese dual purpose hop seeing increased usage in 2008 after hop shortages in the Western world. Imparts an unusual lemon/"bubblegum" and dill pickle flavour.

== Ornamental ==
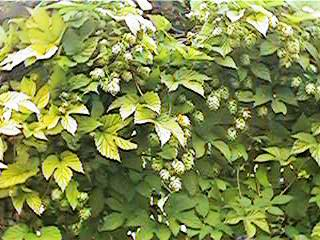
Golden Hop

A pale, ornamental variety, Humulus lupulus 'Aurea', is cultivated for garden use. It is also known as Golden Hop, and holds the Royal Horticultural Society's Award of Garden Merit (AGM).

== Table ==
Name	Country	Alpha acid %
Admiral	England	13.5 - 16
Ahtanum	U.S.	5.7 - 6.3
Amarillo	U.S.	8 - 11
Apollo	U.S.	20 - 21
Bramling Cross	England	5 - 7
Brewer's Gold	England	7.1-11.3
Bullion	England	6.5-9
Cascade	U.S.	4.5-6
Centennial	U.S.	9.5-11.5
Challenger	England	6.5-8.5
Chinook	U.S.	12-14
Citra	U.S.	11-13
Cluster	U.S.	5.5-8.5
Columbus	U.S.	14-18
Crystal	U.S.	3.5-5.5
Eroica	U.S.	9-12
First Gold	England	6.5-8.5
Feux-Coeur Francais	Australia	3.1-5.5
Fuggle	England	4-5.5
Galaxy	Australia	14.9
Galena	U.S.	12-14
Glacier	U.S.	5.5
Goldings	England	4-5.5
Green Bullet	New Zealand	11-14
Greenburg	U.S.	5.2
Hallertau / Hallertauer Mittelfrüh	Germany	3.5-5.5
Herald	England	11-13
Herkules	Germany	12-17
Hersbrucker	Germany	3-5.5
Horizon	U.S.	11-13
Liberty	U.S.	3-5
Lublin	Poland	3-5
Magnum	Germany	11-16
Merkur	Germany	3.5-7
Millennium	U.S.	15.5
Motueka	New Zealand	6.5-7.5
Mosaic	U.S.	11.5-13.5
Mount Hood	U.S.	5-8
Mount Rainier	U.S.	6
Nelson Sauvin	New Zealand	12-14
Newport	U.S.	10-17
Northdown	England	7.5-9.5
Northern Brewer	England	8-10
Nugget	U.S.	12-14
Opal	Germany	3.5-5.5
Pacifica	New Zealand	5-6
Pacific Gem	New Zealand	14-16
Pacific Jade	New Zealand	12-14
Palisade	U.S.	6-10
Perle	Germany	6-10
Phoenix	England	9-13
Pilgrim	England	9-13
Pilot	England	9-12
Pioneer	England	8-10
Polnischer Lublin	Poland	3-4.5
Pride of Ringwood	Australia	7-10
Progress	England	5-7
Riwaka	New Zealand	4.5-6.5
Saaz	Czech Republic	3-4.5
Saaz Late	Czech Republic	3.5-6
Bor	Czech Republic	6-9
Premiant	Czech Republic	7-10
Rubin	Czech Republic	9-12
Agnus	Czech Republic	12 - 14
Vital	Czech Republic	12-16
Sladek	Czech Republic	4.5-8
Kazbek	Czech Republic	5-8
Bohemie	Czech Republic	5-8
Harmonie	Czech Republic	5-8
San Juan Ruby Red	U.S.	7.01
Santiam	U.S.	5-7
Saphir	Germany	2-4.5
Satus	U.S.	12.5-14
Select	Germany	4-6
Simcoe	U.S.	12-14
Smaragd	Germany	3.5-5.5
Sorachi Ace	Japan	10-16
Southern Cross	New Zealand	11-14
Spalt	Germany	4-5
Sterling	U.S.	6-9
Strisselspalt	France	3-5
Styrian Aurora	Slovenia	7-9.5
Styrian Bobek	Slovenia	3.5-7
Styrian Goldings	Slovenia	4.5-6
Styrian Celeia	Slovenia	3-6
Summit	U.S.	17-19
Tardif de Bourgogne	France	3.1-5.5
Target	England	9.5-12.5
Taurus	Germany	12-17
Tettnang	Germany	3.5-5.5
Tomahawk	U.S.	14-18
Tomyski	Poland	2.5-4
Tradition	Germany	5-7
Ultra	U.S.	4.5-5
Vanguard	U.S.	5.5-6
Waimea	New Zealand	16-19
Warrior	U.S.	15-17
Whitbread Golding Variety (WGV)	England	5-8
Willamette	U.S.	4-6
Zeus	U.S.	15

== Litterature ==
- Hieronymus, Stan (2012). For the Love of Hops. Brewers Publications. ISBN 978-1-938469-01-5.
