= Bundesautobahn 92 =

Federal motorway in Germany

A 92
- Bundesautobahn 92

Route information
- Length: 134 km (83 mi)

Location
- Country: Germany
- States: Bavaria

Highway system
- Roads in Germany; Autobahns; List; Federal; List; State; E-roads
← A 91	→ A 93

The Bundesautobahn 92 (translates from German as Federal Motorway 92, short form Autobahn 92, abbreviated as BAB 92 or A 92) connects Munich with Deggendorf, and is 134 kilometres (83 miles) long. Between the interchange Neufahrn and the interchange Munich Airport it has three lanes, otherwise two with a shoulder. There is a traffic control system in the direction of Deggendorf until right before the exit to the airport.

The A 92 essentially follows the lower Isar so that it passes Freising, Moosburg, Landshut, Dingolfing, Landau, Plattling and Deggendorf.

The 60-kilometre (37-mile) stretch of the A 92 between Landshut and Plattling has a very low traffic density. This is also the reason that the A 92 is used in part as a test stretch by the BMW factory in Dingolfing. One notes that among other things the road surface is better in the vicinity of Dingolfing.

== History ==
The first conception of building of an Autobahn along the Isar was at the end of the 1960s. It started with the extension of Bundesstraße 11, and with the building of a bypass for Wallersdorf. Until 1970, a small piece of 5 kilometres (3.1 miles) length of the autobahn was completed already around Wallersdorf, it was named 5-Minuten-Autobahn.

The last section between Dingolfing and Wallersdorf, 21 kilometres (13 miles) long, was completed in 1988.

Originally it was planned to extend the A 92 over its present end in Munich out to the Landshuter Allee, where it would have had a connection to the second Munich ring road A 999. This plan has not been executed.

== Rest Areas ==
There are no filling stations or rest areas in the conventional sense (i.e. those that have their own exit) on the A 92. As a consequence, smaller gasoline station booths have developed into rest areas at many of the exits.

== Exit list ==
Legend:

- I/C - Interchange, I/S - Intersection, RSA - Rest and service area, OBR - Overhead bridge restaurant, R/R - Restaurant and rest plaza, L/B - Layby, V/P - Vista point, TN - tunnel, T/P - Toll plaza, BR - Bridge
- C - Cloverleaf, S - Stack, T-A - Trumpet-A, T-B - Trumpet-B, DT - Directional-T/Y, SDT - Semi-Directional-T/Y, P-Y - Partial-Y, D - Diamond, P-C - Partial cloverleaf, D-D - Diverging diamond, D-R - Direct ramp

km	Exit	Name	Destinations	Notes
	(1)	München-Feldmoching 3-way interchange A 99 E52		
		Oberschleißheim-Süd (planned)		
	(2)	Oberschleißheim B 471		
		Riedmoos (planned)		
	(3)	Unterschleißheim B 13		
	(4)	Neufahrn 4-way interchange A 9 E45		
	(4a)	Eching-Ost		
		Munich–Regensburg railway		
		Erding Ring Closure		
	(5)	Freising-Süd B 11		
		Isar		
	(6)	Munich Airport B 301		
		parking area		
	(7)	Freising-Mitte B 301		
	(8)	Freising-Ost B 11a		
		Brücke Vorflutgraben-Nord 80 m		
	(9)	Erding		
		Dorfen		
		Sempt-Flutkanal		
		Rest area Isartal (planned)		
		Rest area Moosburger Au		
	(10)	Moosburg-Süd		
		Mittlere-Isar-Kanal		
	(11)	Moosburg-Nord B 11		
		Isar 500 m		
	(12)	Landshut-West		
		Munich–Regensburg railway		
		Eugenbachtalbürcke 150 m		
		Pfettrachtalbrücke 330 m		
	(13)	Altdorf B 299		
		Rest area Altdorf (planned)		
	(14)	Landshut-Nord B 299		
		Munich–Regensburg railway		
	(15)	Landshut / Essenbach B 15		
	15a	Essenbach	B 15n	Under construction
		Rest area Wattenbacher Au		
		Rest area Mettenbacher Moos		
	(16)	Wörth an der Isar		
	(16a)	Dingolfing-West		
		Rest area Teisbacher Moos		
	(17)	Dingolfing-Mitte		
	(17a)	Dingolfing-Ost		
	(18)	Pilsting / Großköllnbach		
		Rest area		
	(19)	Landau an der Isar B 20		
	(20)	Wallersdorf-West		
	(21)	Wallersdorf-Nord		
	(22)	Plattling-West B 8		
		Regensburg–Passau railway		
		parking area		
		parking area		
		Plattling-Mitte (under construction)		
		Bavarian Forest Railway		
	(23)	Plattling-Nord		
	(24)	Deggendorf 4-way interchange A 3 E56		
		Donau		
	(25)	Deggendorf-Mitte		
End of the motorway		End of the motorway		
B 11 E53 Regen
