= Bundesstraße 11a =

Federal highway in Germany

B 11a
- Bundesstraße 11a

Route information
- Length: 3 km (1.9 mi)

Location
- Country: Germany
- States: Bavaria

Highway system
- Roads in Germany; Autobahns; List; Federal; List; State; E-roads

The Bundesstraße 11a (B11a) is a German federal highway in Bavaria, Germany.

== Overview ==
The B11a serves as a feeder road between the A95 (motorway junction 6 at Wolfratshausen) and the B11 at Wolfratshausen.

=== Freising district ===
In addition, there was a motorway feeder in the district of Freising under the name B11a, which served as the eastern bypass the city of Freising. This ran between the motorway junction Freising-Ost of the A92 and the former B11. In the course of downgrading the B11 to a state highway, the road has now been rededicated however as B301.
