= Wakatu Hops =

Variety of hops from New Zealand

Wakatu Hops are dual purpose hops used for flavouring and bittering beer. They are grown in Nelson, New Zealand. They received their name from a corrupted spelling of Whakatu, the Māori name for Nelson. Being bred from the Hallertau hop, they are often semi-correctly referred to as Hallertau hops, and the two varieties are often interchangeable in beer recipes due to their close ties.

== History ==
The Wakatu hop variety was created by HortResearch as an attempt to breed a new aroma hop. Female Hallertau Mittlefrüh was pollinated by the male of a New Zealand hop variety. The resultant hop was suited as a dual-purpose hop and was released from HortResearch's Riwaka Research Centre in 1988.

== Use in the brewing of beer ==
Because Wakatu is a dual-purpose hop, it can be used in Single Malt and Single Hop (also known as SMaSH) beer recipes with excellent results. Because of the middle road that was taken between this hop possessing high aroma and high alpha rating, it has a slightly lower alpha rating than some other hop varieties, generally in the range of 6%–9%. Put simply, this translates to a lower bittering potential when compared to dedicated bittering hops, but also offers the advantage of being able to contribute aromatics to the beer, to which non-dual-purpose bittering hops aren't so well suited. Wakatu hops have a distinct presence of myrcene measured to be at 35.5% or even up to 59%. This contributes subtle flavours akin those of citrus fruit, notably the lime.

== See also ==
- Beer in New Zealand
- List of hop varieties
