= Ernest Stanley Salmon =

British mycologist and plant pathologist

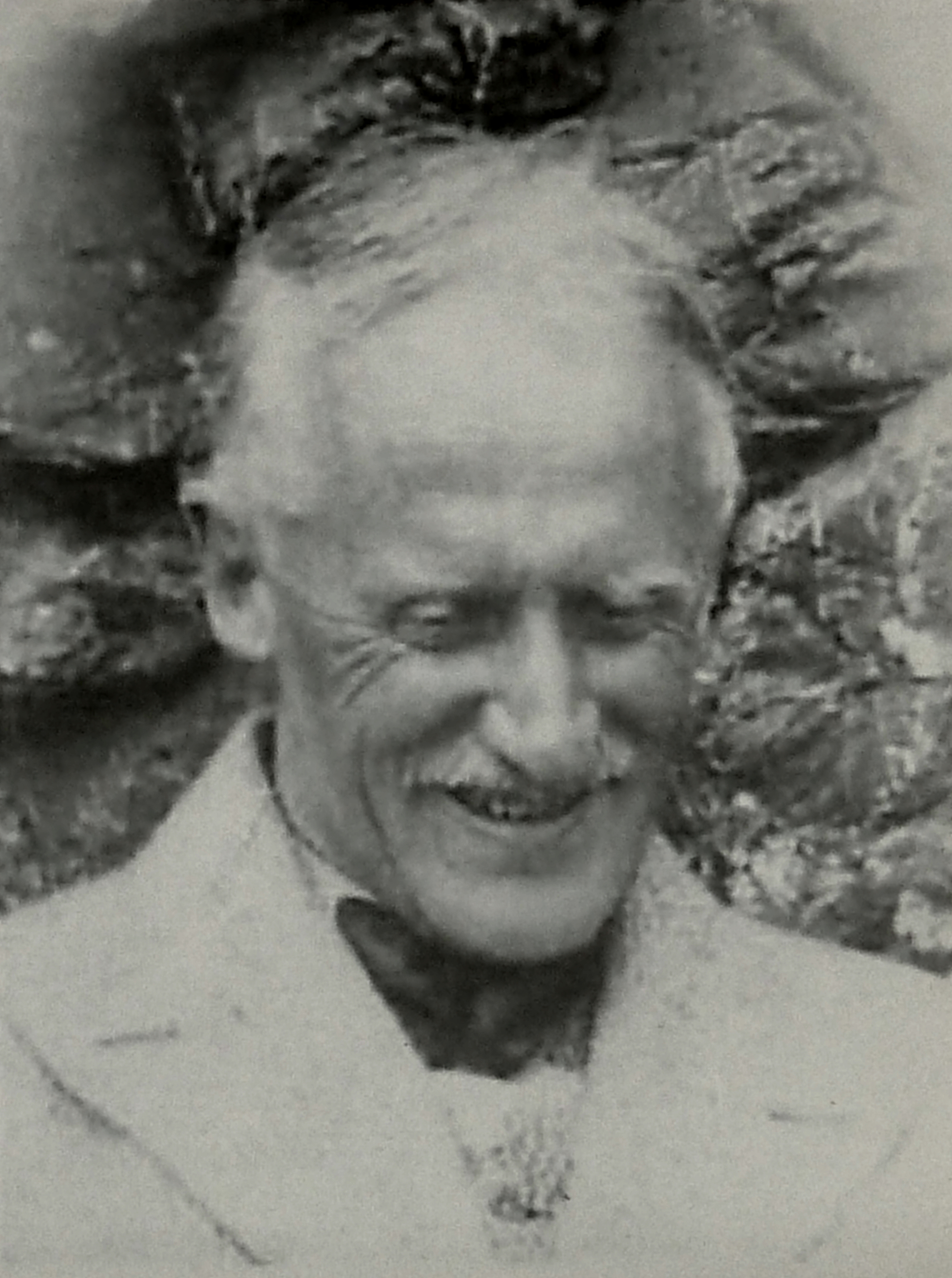
Ernest Stanley Salmon, c. 1939

Ernest Stanley Salmon (1 June 1871 – 12 October 1959) was a British mycologist and plant pathologist best known for his work in breeding new varieties of hops. Salmon crossed a wild Manitoban hop with cultivated English stock to create hybrid C9a, which was released to commercial cultivation in 1934 as Brewer's Gold. Though the original wild hop died during the winter of 1918–19, Brewer's Gold has become the ancestor of nearly every new high-alpha hop variety released since then.

Salmon was born in Richmond, Surrey, England, in 1871 and held a number of research and teaching positions through his life. He was a researcher at the Kew Gardens from 1899 to 1906 and at Wye College from 1906 to 1937. Salmon was elected as the president of the British Mycological Society in 1911, he was appointed as a reader in mycology at London University in 1912 and was promoted to a full professorship there in 1925.

As his obituaries noted, Salmon was an excellent tennis player. He reached the Wimbledon men's singles quarter final in 1903. Salmon lived for most of his life in the village of Wye. He died in a Folkestone nursing home on October 12, 1959.

== Disease research ==
Though he is remembered today as a breeder of hops, Salmon's career started as a mycologist and plant pathologist with the Jodrell Laboratory, Kew in 1899. He specialized in the study of powdery mildew, a fungus which commonly afflicts food crops, is a particular issue for hops, and for which there was no widely known treatment at the time. (Note: The primary species of fungus affecting hops and causing powdery mildew is Podosphaera macularis, known as Sphaerotheca humuli when Salmon wrote his monograph on the disease. Powdery mildew can also seriously affect strawberries and other food crops. Despite the invention of a copper sulfate fungicide known as the "Bordeaux mixture" around 1875, this treatment was not universally used, as the chemistry and ideal method of application were not understood.)

In 1906, Salmon moved to the South Eastern Agricultural College at Wye (part of London University commonly referred to as Wye College) to continue his research into the fungal pathology affecting various food crops, including hops. While there, he began to investigate the hybridization of hops under the College's new hop breeding program, with an eye first towards creating new varieties resistant to diseases affecting the plant.

Salmon's research into the diseases of hops, and recommendations to growers on prevention and treatment, continued for much of his career.

== Breeding programme ==
Until about 1900, there were no large scale, scientific attempts to cultivate new varieties of hops. There were some known varieties, but they were identified primarily by geography and gross differences in the plants' characteristics. While hops were propagated by root cuttings, "cloning" certain genomes, little effort was expended in preserving specific strains or in producing new, high quality cultivars. (Note: Hops have distinct male and female forms, so any plant raised from seed is considered a new variety, as it inherently has genes from both parents. Hops must be propagated by cuttings from the rhizome to ensure consistency across multiple plants.) On top of this, crop yield was highly variable from year to year, due to the effects of disease, pests, and rainfall. Farmers would experience a full crop yield perhaps once in a decade, leading to overplanting, which in turn caused large variances in the supply and price of hops between good and bad harvests. Wye College started a hop cultivation program in 1904 to address this issue by applying new principles of plant breeding to the crop. By 1917, Salmon and Wye had partnered with the East Malling Research Station to grow hops on a larger scale, in order to evaluate the commercial properties of promising crosses.

Salmon's first goal for the hop breeding programme, as an extension of his research in plant pathology, was to develop disease-resistant strains. Through Salmon's career, hops were known to be a bittering agent, but research and interest in hops, particularly those originating in the Americas, was around the preservative value of the hops, the source of that value, and methods of measurement. Despite this value, brewers generally regarded American-grown hops as inferior, because of their higher levels of bitterness and particularly because of aromas considered unpleasant at the time. Salmon noted early on that English brewers were forced to blend in American-grown hops for their higher preservative value, despite this inferiority, and his breeding research expanded to include this criterion.

As his research was directed toward commercial exploitation of hops, the published summaries generally included the parentage of each variety, comparative crop yield, resistance to common diseases, "resins-contents" (α- and β-acids), and particularly the results of commercial brewing trials with promising strains. (Note: Salmon published the results of his research following every crop year for decades. See, for example the Tenth, Twentieth, and Thirtieth Report on the Trial of New Varieties of Hops.)

=== Methodology ===
It can take a decade or more to bring a single variety from first breeding to full scale farming and some of Salmon's hops took far longer than this to see commercial use. Brewer's Gold was first planted in 1919, but not released until 1934, nearly two decades later. Cross OZ97a was first bred in 1921, did not reach farm trials until 1957, and it has only been released for commercial cultivation as of 2014. (Note: Taste and brewer's requirements have changed over the years and Wye Hops has begun reevaluating varieties that were previously rejected. Plant OZ97a was rejected after brewing trials in 1957-58 for having a "coarse, American aroma", a trait which brewers and consumers now find desirable.)

At the time Salmon began his research, the accepted method for breeding hops was to simply cross the best representatives of a given variety. Recognizing that he could only make incremental improvements to a cultivar in that way, Salmon decided to inject new breeding material into the existing English stock. He collected hops from the United States, Canada and continental Europe and began crossing them with traditional English varieties.

Because of the hit-or-miss nature of finding valuable new varieties, Salmon's procedure was to cross hundreds or thousands of plants each year. By 1930, he said he had grown more than 10,000 seedlings. Some crosses, particularly early in the program, were by open pollination. Later, to select for specific characteristics, field workers would bag each cluster of cones before the female bines flowered, to protect them from wild pollination. They would then apply pollen from a selected male plant to the flower with a paint brush and reseal the bag. Once seeds had formed, the bags could be removed. The seeds would then be planted the following year and evaluation of the new cross could begin the year after that.

To identify individual plants, Salmon assigned a sequential letter (and later, pairs of letters) to each row garden and a number to each hill in the row. If a plant was later replaced, a lower case letter was appended. For example, cross C9a was in the third row, ninth hill, and was the second seed planted in that location. Once a likely candidate had been identified and grown to a scale useful in brewing at East Malling, Salmon and his colleagues would submit it to several brewers for trials "in copper." Following a successful brewing trial, the hops would be released to selected farmers for commercial growing trials before being released. A significant portion of his reports each year were dedicated to these commercial brewing and growing tests.

== Awards ==
Horace Brown Medal, 1955

== Varieties introduced by Salmon ==
Salmon was instrumental in introducing numerous new hop varieties to British commercial cultivation. Brewer's Gold was the seminal hop bred by Salmon and is ancestor to most of the high-alpha hops released since that time. Its seed was planted by Salmon in 1919 from the cross of a wild female hop collected in Manitoba (grown at Wye and identified as BB1) with an English male hop. Brewer's Gold was his first commercial release, introduced in 1934, nearly three decades after he started his research at Wye College. The bulk of his releases occurred in the 1940s, as brewer interest in the "New Varieties" grew and many brewing trials of the hops originating at Wye took place.

E. S. Salmon hop releases (Note: Except as cited, all information in the table is taken from the 2014 presentation by Allison Capper and Dr. Peter Darby. This table does not include any varieties originally crossed by Professor Salmon which may have been released after his lifetime.)
Variety	Released	Notes
Brewer's Gold	1934	Planting C9a.An ancestor of very many modern hop cultivars, seedling of BB1.
Brewer's Favourite	1934	Planting OP21
Quality	1936	OO63
Early Promise	1937	Planting X35
Bullion	1938	Q43
July Hop	1940	Planting CC31
Nonsuch	1940	Planting OB53
August Gold	1940	Planting WWF12
Nonsuch (2nd)	1942	Planting OM26 (bud sport of OB53}
Brewers Standby	1943	HH44
College Cluster	1943	N15 (bis)
Malling Midseason	1943	BB28
John Ford	1944	WFA90
Northern Brewer	1944	WFB135
Pride of Kent	1946	170a
Sunshine	1946	V94
Agate	1947	Planting AGG8
Giantess	1947	
Concord	1948	OH44
Early Choice	1948	FF21
Keyworths Early	1949	Planting OJ47, wilt resistant. Descended from wild American hop via Y90 and EE92.
Keyworths Midseason	1949	Planting OR55, wilt resistant. Open pollination in 1924 of wild American hop.
Bramling Cross	1951	Planting OT48
Norton Court Golding	1952	
Copper Hop	1954	
