= Hop Research Center Hüll =

Research center in Hüll, Germany

Hopfenforschungszentrum Hüll
- Established: 1926
- Focus: Hops
- Owner: Deutsche Gesellschaft für Hopfenforschung; Bavarian state
- Formerly called: Hans-Pfülf-Institut
- Location: Hüll (Wolnzach), Bavaria, Germany
- Website: http://www.hopfenforschung.de/

The Hop Research Center Hüll (Hopfenforschungszentrum Hüll) is a research institution focussing on advances in hop breeding, hop harvesting, and hop chemistry. It is located in the Hallertau, the largest continuous hop-planting area in the world, in the German state of Bavaria. The institute is run by the German Hop Research Society (Deutsche Gesellschaft für Hopfenforschung) and the Bavarian state.

== History ==
The Hop Research Society was founded in 1926 in response to an endemic of downy mildew in Germany. It was endowed with a land grant of 71 Ha in Hüll for the conduction of hop breeding experiments to generate mildew-resistant hop cultivars. In 1962, a research institute was built on the site. Originally named the Hans-Pfülf-Institut after the then president of the German Brewers Federation, it was later renamed to the current Hopfenforschungszentrum Hüll.

Under its first research director, Hugo Hampp (from 1926 to 1944), the institute focussed on countering the Peronosporaceae infections of the hop plants, which were causing downy mildew, primarily by means of pesticides. Hampp's successor, Friedrich Zattler (from 1944 to 1970), shifted the focus towards breeding of mildew-resistant hop varieties. This resulted in the new varieties Hüller Anfang (1962), Hüller Aroma (1962), Hüller Fortschritt (1964), Hüller Bitterer (1970), and Hallertauer Gold (1974).

The Hop Research Center's third director, Johann Maier (from 1971 to 1973), expanded the field of research to hop chemistry and hop oils. Under his presidency, the Bavarian ministry of agriculture joined the Hop Research Society, and the Hop Research Center became a subsidiary of the Bavarian state. Today, the institute is run in public–private partnership between the Hop Research Society and the Bavarian state.

== Hop varieties ==
In addition to the above-mentioned mildew-resistant hop varieties, the institute developed a number of aroma hop varieties, including Hallertauer Tradition (1991), Opal, Perle (1970s), Saphir, Spalter Select, and Smaragd, as well as the high alpha varieties Hallertauer Magnum (1980), Hallertauer Merkur, Hallertauer Taurus, and Herkules (2005). Two new aroma hops were released in 2019 and 2020, respectively: Diamant (2019), which is a direct descendant of the old land hop variety Spalter, and Aurum (2020), a direct descendant of another old land hop variety, Tettnanger. Both feature higher yields and better resistance against Verticillium wilt and Peronospora fungi infections than their respective ancestors while retaining their aroma.

In response to the global craft beer movement, the institute developed several "special flavor hops": Hallertau Blanc, Huell Melon, Mandarina Bavaria, and Polaris were released in 2012, and Ariana and Callista were released in 2016.
