= Wolnzach =

- Municipality
- Coat of arms

- Location of Wolnzach within Pfaffenhofen a.d.Ilm district
- Interactive map of Wolnzach
- Location within Germany Location within Bavaria
- Coordinates: 48°36′N 11°37′E
- Country: Germany
- State: Bavaria
- Admin. region: Oberbayern
- District: Pfaffenhofen a.d.Ilm

Government
  - Mayor (2020–26): Jens Machold (CSU)

Area
  - Total: 91.5 km^{2} (35.3 sq mi)
- Elevation: 415 m (1,362 ft)

Population (2025-12-31)
  - Total: 11,520
  - Density: 126/km^{2} (326/sq mi)
- Time zone: UTC+01:00 (CET)
  - Summer (DST): UTC+02:00 (CEST)
- Postal codes: 85283
- Dialling codes: 08442
- Vehicle registration: PAF
- Website: www.wolnzach.de

Wolnzach (German pronunciation: [ˈvɔlntsax], locally [ˈvɔɪntsɔ(x)]) is a municipality in the district of Pfaffenhofen in Bavaria, Germany. It is also a "seal district" ("Siegelbezirk") of the hop-planting area Hallertau, and home of important hops-related institutions such as the German Hops Museum ("Deutsches Hopfenmuseum") and the Hop Research Center Hüll.

== History ==
Wolnzach was first mentioned in the foundation document of Wessobrunn Abbey in 756, by the name of Wolamotesaha. In 1150 there occurs the first documentary reference to Wolnzach as the site of a market.

In 1926, the German Hop Research Society established a research site in Hüll near Wolnzach, which would develop into the Hop Research Center Hüll in 1962.

The German Hop Museum was founded in 2002.

Alois Dallmayr, former owner of the famous Dallmayr food store in Munich originated from Wolnzach.

== Twin towns ==
Wolnzach is twinned with Poperinge in Belgium since 1965.
