= Wolfratshauser Straße =

Road in Munich, Germany

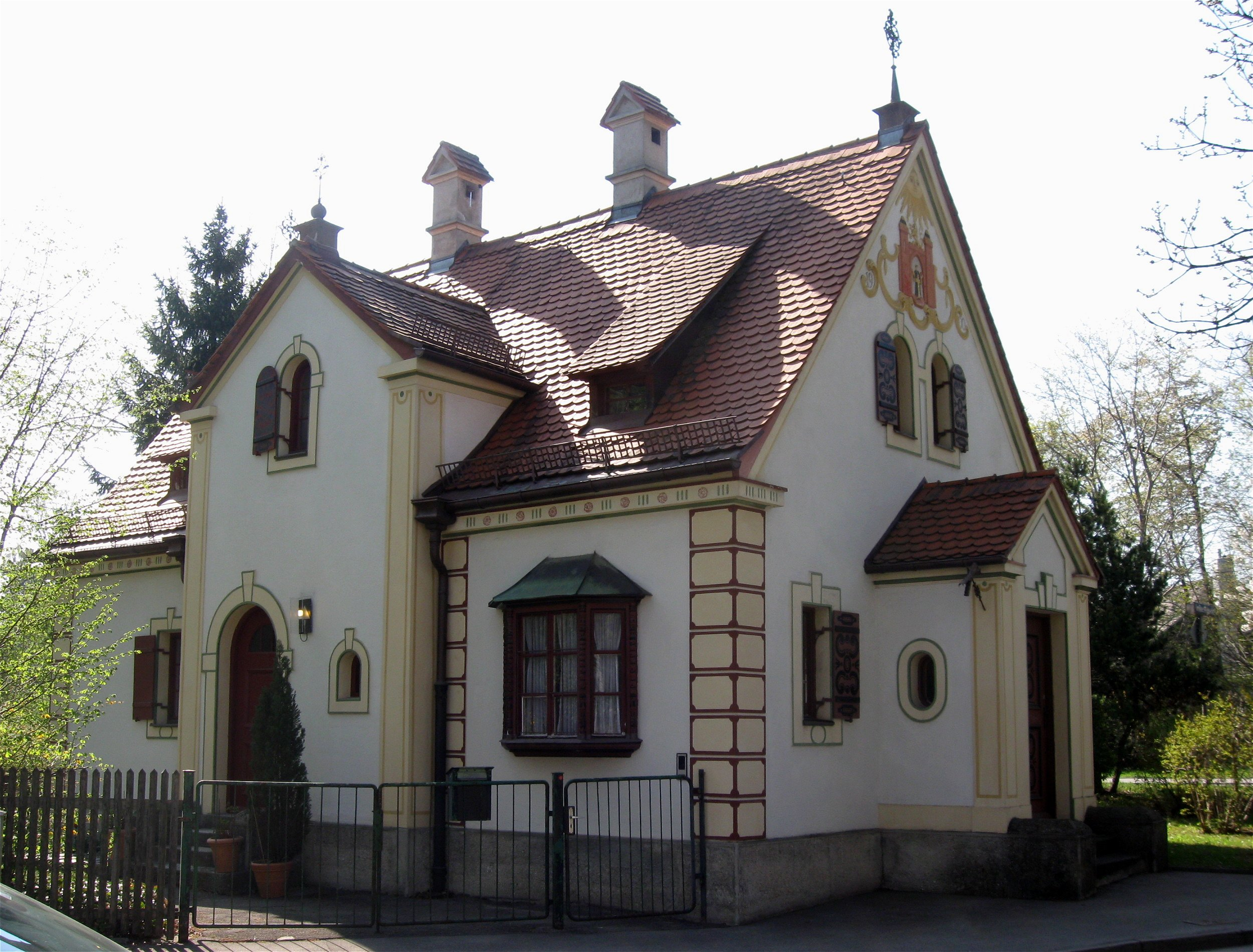
- Former customs house (No. 139)

- Location within Germany
- Location: Munich
- Postal code: 81479
- Nearest metro station: Moosach (U3), Höhenkirchen-Siegertsbrunn (S7)
- Coordinates: 48.10074°N 11.541159°E
- Major junctions: Boschetsrieder Str., Irschenhauser Str., Schmideberg, Rupert-Mayer-Str., Kreppeberg, Saargemünder Str., Neunkirchner Str., Ludwigshöher Str., Siemensallee, Noestr., Beuerberger Str., Großhesseloher Str., Josephinenstr., Ascholdinger Str., Peretshofener Str., Friedastr., Georg-Strebl-Str., Dr.-Carl-von-Linde-Str., Sollner Str., Frans-Hals-Str., Herterichstr., Ringelnatzweg, Bertelestr., Melchiorstr., Strähuberstr., Werlingstr., Warnbergstr., Wilhelm-Leibl-Str.

Wolfratshauser Straße is a major road in Munich. It forms part of the Bundesstraße 11 (federal highway) and is named after the city Wolfratshausen south of Munich, in whose direction it leads.

== Route ==
The street is located in the district of Thalkirchen-Obersendling-Forstenried-Fürstenried-Solln. It starts at the Boschetsrieder Straße, where it continues along the Plinganserstraße in a southerly direction on the western high bank of the Isar. Passing the Villenkolonie Prinz-Ludwigs-Höhe (villa colony), it leads to Solln and crosses the Munich-Holzkirchen railway line by a bridge. From Solln, the road continues to Pullach in the Isar Valley, where it continues on a street that bears the same name. Immediately on the city limits the Kloster St. Gabriel (monastery) is located on its right-hand side.

The B11 remains with the name Wolfratshauser Straße until the municipal boundary of Hohenschäftlarn, from there and up to Wolfratshausen it is called Münchner Straße.

== Traffic ==
The southern exit of Solln station on the S-Bahn lines 7 and 20 is crossed by the road over a bridge.

The B11 and, therefore the Wolfratshauser Straße, is an important connecting road in the city. Outside the city, Bundesautobahn 95 Federal Highway runs parallel to the west and routes the outer regional traffic to the south. The Wolfratshauser Straße therefore only connects to the Munich suburbs on the west bank of the Isar, such as Pullach and Schäftlarn.

== Historical monuments ==
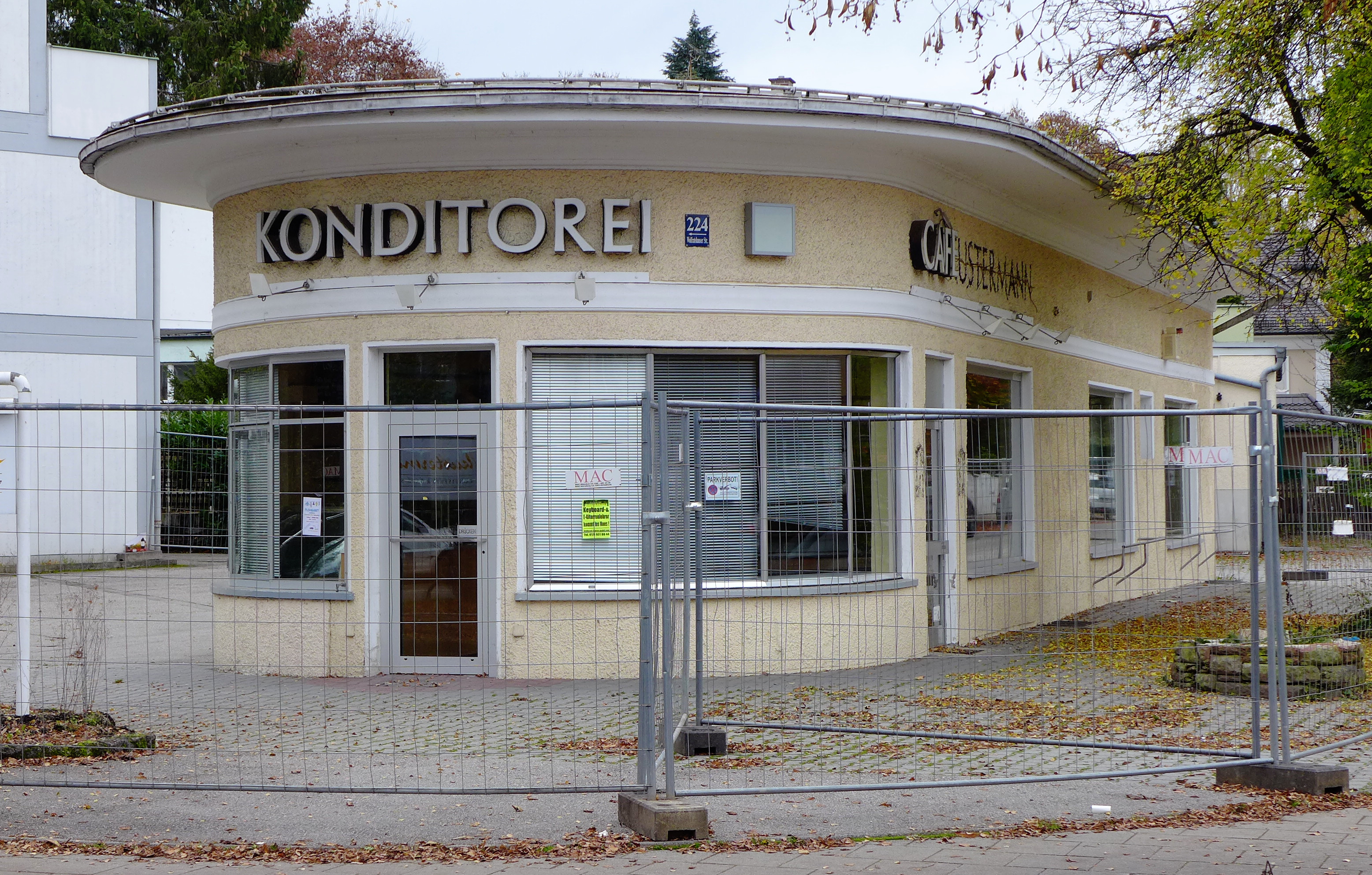
Former makeshift shop (No. 224)

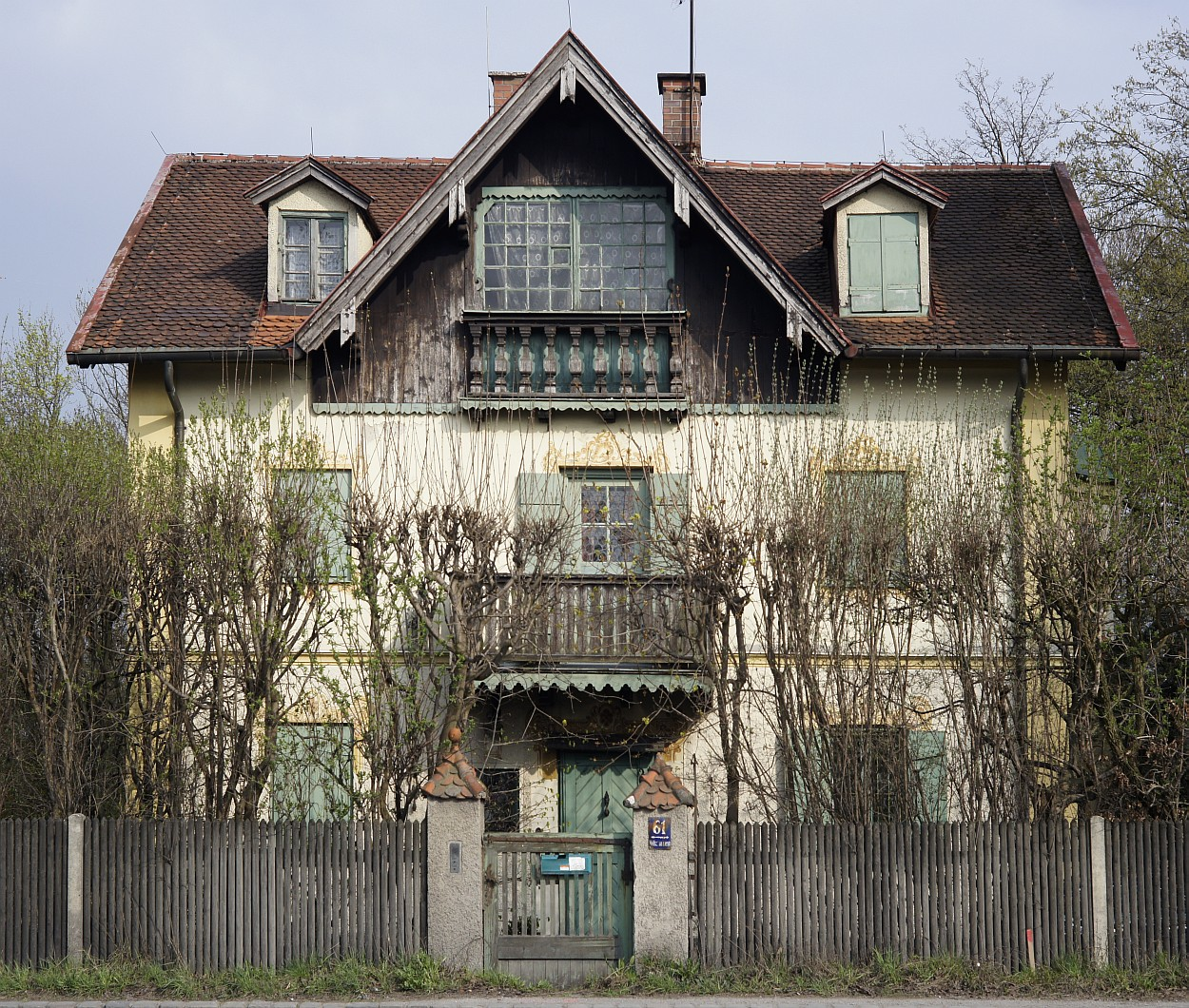
Wolfratshauser Straße 61

On Wolfratshauser Straße are the following buildings listed in the Bavarian monument list of historical monuments:

- Nr. 26: Apartment block, 1912/13, Hans Woock for Georg Hauberrisser 1912/13
- Nr. 27: Villa
- Nr. 42: Villa, 1899, Otto Dix
- Nr. 50: Villa, 1912, Otho Orlando Kurz and Eduard Herbert
- Nr. 61: Villa, 1879/80 built as a hunting lodge for consul Karl Rosipal, expanded in 1922
- Nr. 80: 1902, Brothers Rank
- Nr. 91/99/107: Hospital Martha Maria 1897/1912
- Nr. 139: Former customs house, 1900, Hans Grässel
- Nr. 155: Villa, 1906, Josef Schatz
- Nr. 224: Former makeshift shop, 1951, Ludwig Reiber, extended in 1956 (removed from the list of monuments in 2004)
