= Erlau (river) =

River of Bavaria, Germany

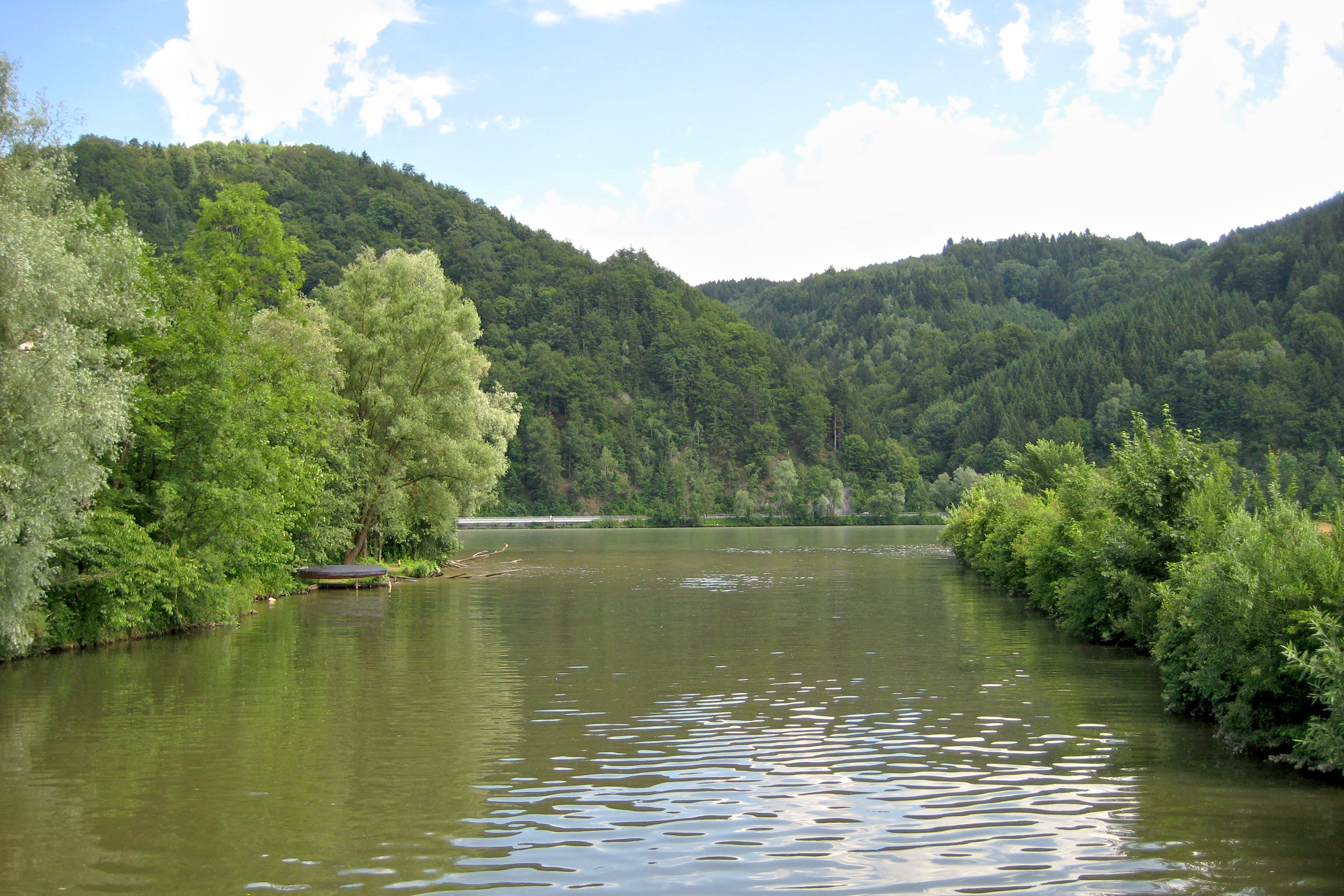
- Conjunction of Erlau and Danube

Location
- Country: Germany
- State: Bavaria

Physical characteristics
- Source
  - location: Erlauzwieseler See
- Mouth
  - location: Danube
  - coordinates: 48.5624°N 13.5814°E
  - elevation: 290 m (950 ft)
- Length: 33.7 km (20.9 mi)
- Basin size: 218 km^{2} (84 sq mi)

Basin features
- Progression: Danube→ Black Sea

Erlau (German pronunciation: [ˈɛʁlaʊ]) is a river of Bavaria, Germany. It flows into the Danube in the village Erlau.

== See also ==
- List of rivers of Bavaria
