= Erlau (Freising) =

- Ortsteil of Freising
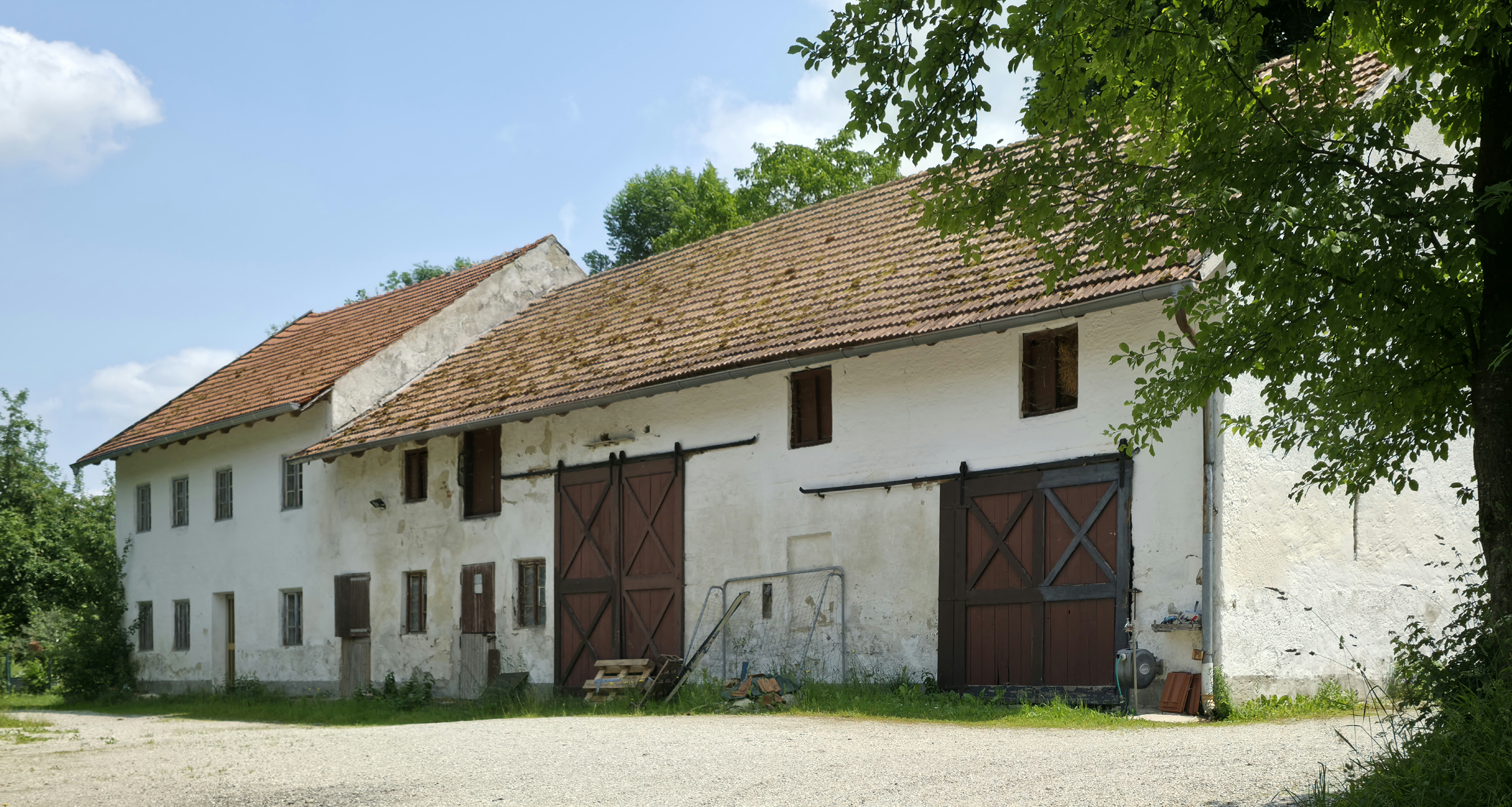
- Interactive map of Erlau
- Location within Germany Location within Bavaria
- Coordinates: 48°26′20″N 11°45′50″E
- Country: Germany
- State: Bavaria
- Admin. region: Oberbayern
- District: Freising
- Town: Freising
- Time zone: UTC+01:00 (CET)
  - Summer (DST): UTC+02:00 (CEST)
- Postal codes: 85356
- Vehicle registration: FS

Erlau (German pronunciation: [ˈɛʁlaʊ]) is a district of the town of Freising, Bavaria, Germany. The village is located on the southern edge of the Amper valley, about five kilometers north of Freising. Surrounding places are Tüntenhausen, Zurnhausen, Zolling and Itzling. Erlau is located 441m above sea level and had 57 inhabitants in 2012. The federal highway 301 goes through the district.

Until 1972 Erlau was part of the municipality of Tüntenhausen and was then incorporated in the context of a municipal area reform to Freising.
