= Dorfen (river) =

River in Bavaria

- The Dorfen at Eitting

Location
- Country: Germany
- State: Bavaria

Physical characteristics
- Mouth
  - location: Isar
  - coordinates: 48.4320°N 11.9172°E
- Length: 33.3 km (20.7 mi)
- Basin size: 141 km^{2} (54 sq mi)

Basin features
- Progression: Isar→ Danube→ Black Sea

Dorfen (German pronunciation: [ˈdɔʁfn̩]) is a river of Bavaria, Germany. It flows into the Isar near Moosburg.

== See also ==
- List of rivers of Bavaria
