= Au in der Hallertau =

Au i.d. Hallertau
- Municipality
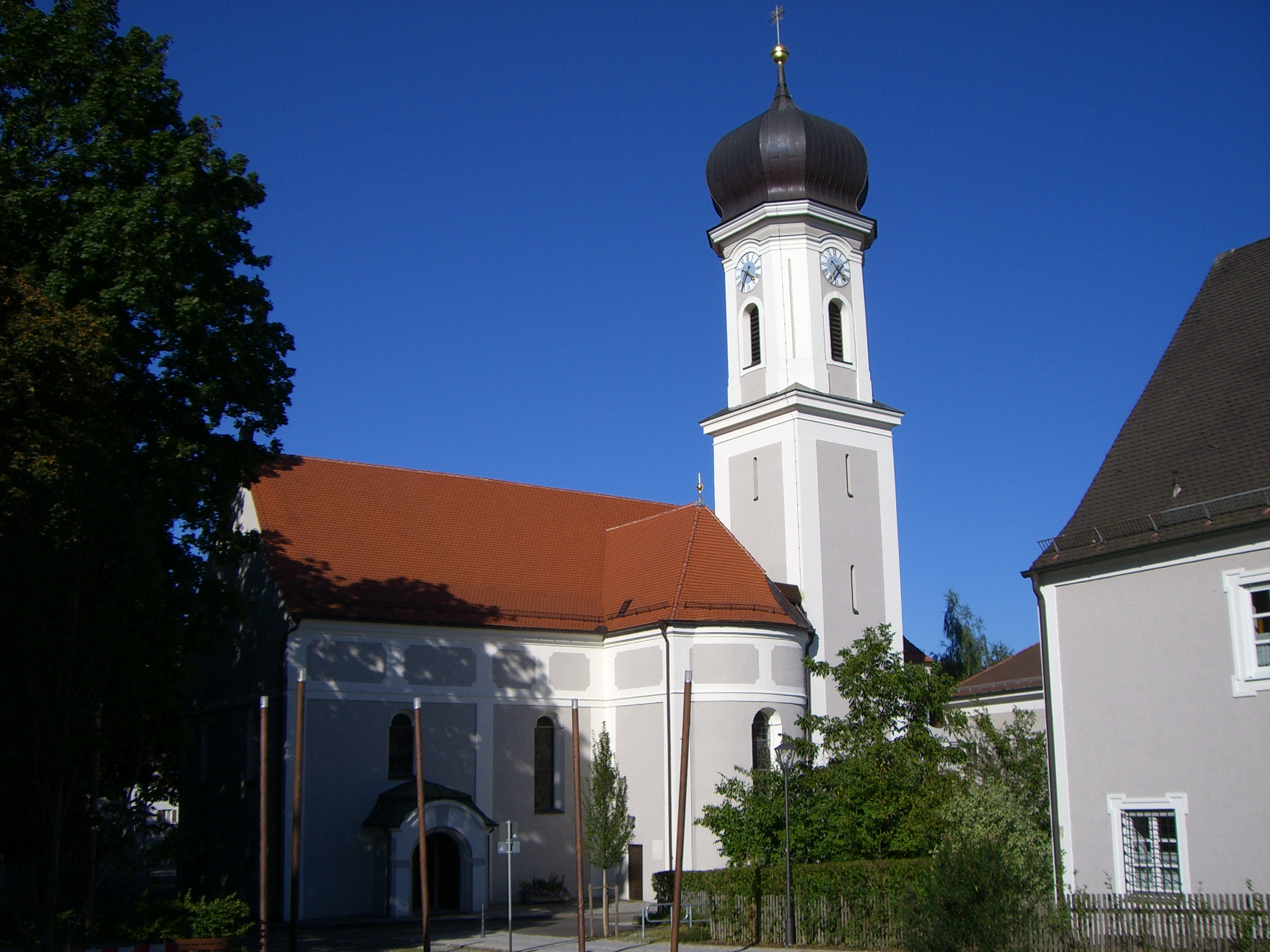
- Church and market place

- Coat of arms

- Location of Au i.d. Hallertau within Freising district
- Interactive map of Au i.d. Hallertau
- Location within Germany Location within Bavaria
- Coordinates: 48°33′27″N 11°44′30″E
- Country: Germany
- State: Bavaria
- Admin. region: Oberbayern
- District: Freising

Government
  - Mayor (2020–26): Hans Sailer (FW)

Area
  - Total: 54.99 km^{2} (21.23 sq mi)
- Elevation: 452 m (1,483 ft)

Population (2025-12-31)
  - Total: 6,266
  - Density: 113.9/km^{2} (295.1/sq mi)
- Time zone: UTC+01:00 (CET)
  - Summer (DST): UTC+02:00 (CEST)
- Postal codes: 84072
- Dialling codes: 08752
- Vehicle registration: FS
- Website: www.markt-au.de

The municipality of Au in der Hallertau (German pronunciation: [ˈaʊ ʔɪn deːɐ̯ ˈhalɐtaʊ], lit. 'Au in the Hallertau') is located in the north of the district of Freising and in the southern part of the Hallertau, in Bavaria, Germany. Au is famous for its important role in hop planting and hop distribution.
