= Community Plant Variety Office =

Agency of the European Union

- Formation: 1994 (established)
- Location: 44, rue François Cévert • CS 10121 49101 ANGERS CEDEX 2 • FRANCE
- President: Francesco Mattina
- Staff: circa 50
- Website: cpvo.europa.eu

The Community Plant Variety Office (CPVO) is an agency of the European Union, located in Angers, France. It was established in 1994. Its task is to administer a system of plant variety rights, also known as plant breeders' rights, a form of intellectual property right relating to plants.

The CPVO manages the largest system of plant variety rights in the world. Since the creation of the CPVO in 1995, the office has received about 78,000 applications, of which over 62,000 were granted, with over 30,000 rights currently in force.

== Community plant variety right ==
Plant variety rights allow plant breeders to protect new varieties or types of plants. The CPVO was created to encourage the creation of new plant varieties in the European Union, through the provision of better intellectual property protection for plant breeders. The Community plant variety right gives to its holder an exclusive right to market the protected variety within the territory of the European Union. The Community PVR is valid for a period of 25 to 30 years.

=== Breeders' Exemption ===
The Breeders' Exemption ensures that anyone is allowed to use protected (PVR) varieties as a basis for the creation of new varieties. The Breeders' Exemption exists to ensure that PVR and the need to reward breeders for their work is balanced with the need for new and better varieties to reach and benefit the consumer as quickly as possible. It also ensures the continued production of new varieties as breeders need access to as much genetic resources as possible, including protected varieties, in order to create new varieties.

=== Application ===
The CPVO system of PVR protection means that only one application need be made (directly to the CPVO) in order to attain EU-wide protection. Before its introduction, EU-wide protection was only possible through obtaining national plant variety rights from the individual member states. That option still exists today.

As part of the application procedure, each candidate variety is tested by an examination office. The examination offices are based in the member states, where they are operated by national experts. The examination offices determine whether the variety is distinct, uniform and stable – this is called a DUS test. The CPVO does not own any technical infrastructure.

The results of the DUS tests are used by the CPVO when taking the decision to grant or refuse a PVR application.

== Organisation ==
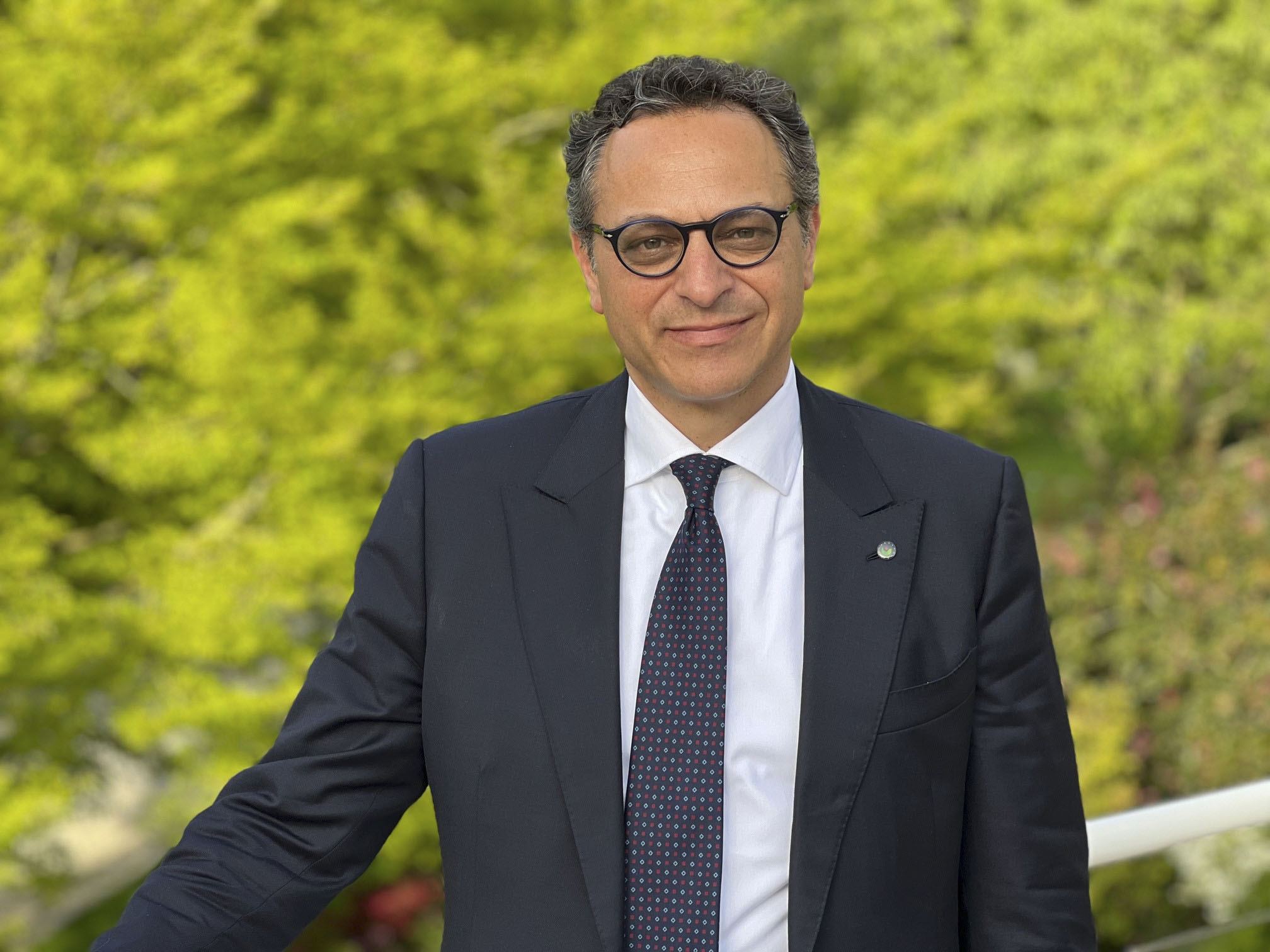
Francesco Mattina, President of CPVO (2022)

Based in Angers, France the CPVO was created by the Council Regulation 2100/94 and has been operational since the 27 April 1995.

The CPVO is entirely self-financed. It neither takes from nor contributes to the EU budget. The CPVO's budget is principally derived from PVR application fees paid by breeders who wish to protect their creations.

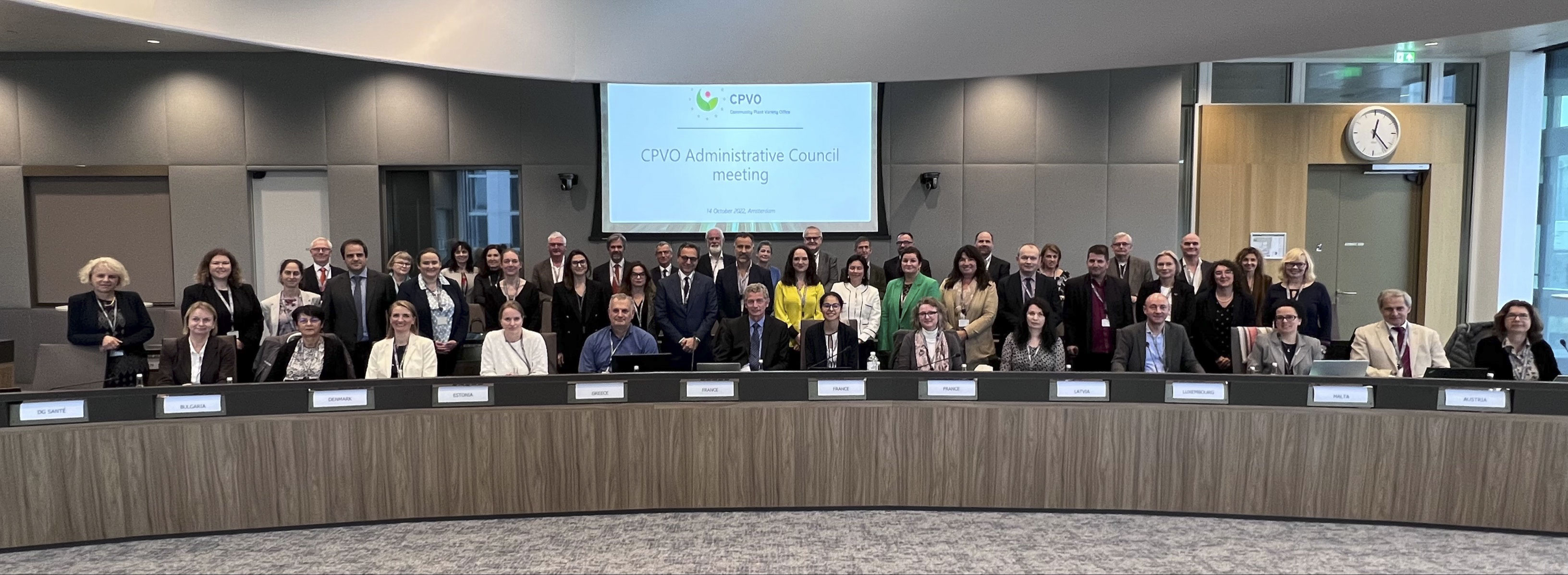
The Administrative Council of CPVO in Amsterdam, October 2022

• President. Responsible for the operation of the office, legislative functions and all operational aspects. He is appointed by the Council of the EU.

Current President: Francesco Mattina, appointed in 2021. In the past, he served as Vice President from 2017 to 2021 and joined the office in 2013 as Head of Legal Unit.

• Administrative Council. Supervises the CPVO. It is made up of representatives of the 27 member states, representatives of the European Commission and observer organizations. It is also the budgetary authority of the CPVO and adopts the annual work schedule of responsibilities.

• Exams office. They carry out the DHS studies of the corresponding applications.
