= Wallersdorf =

- Municipality
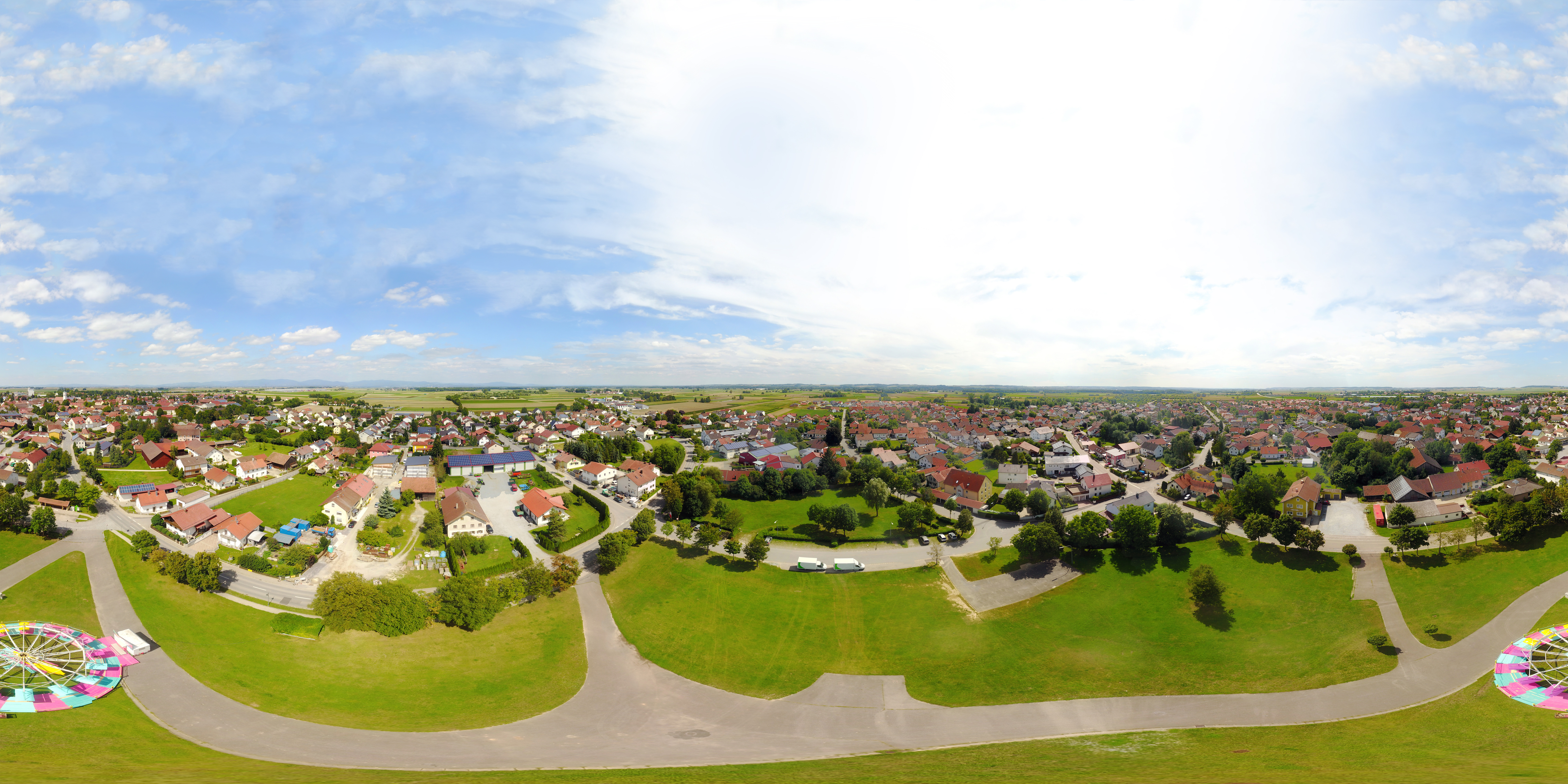
- Panorama of Wallersdorf

- Coat of arms

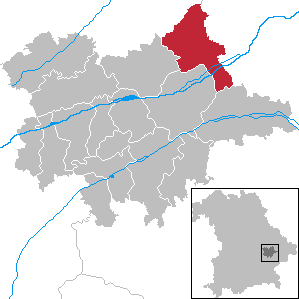
- Location of Wallersdorf within Dingolfing-Landau district
- Interactive map of Wallersdorf
- Location within Germany Location within Bavaria
- Coordinates: 48°44′N 12°45′E
- Country: Germany
- State: Bavaria
- Admin. region: Niederbayern
- District: Dingolfing-Landau
- Subdivisions: 17 Ortsteile

Government
  - Mayor (2020–26): Franz Aster

Area
  - Total: 71.15 km^{2} (27.47 sq mi)
- Elevation: 334 m (1,096 ft)

Population (2025-12-31)
  - Total: 7,271
  - Density: 102.2/km^{2} (264.7/sq mi)
- Time zone: UTC+01:00 (CET)
  - Summer (DST): UTC+02:00 (CEST)
- Postal codes: 94522
- Dialling codes: 09933
- Vehicle registration: DGF
- Website: www.markt-wallersdorf.de

Wallersdorf is a market town and municipality in the district of Dingolfing-Landau in Bavaria in Germany.
