= Bundesstraße 11 =

Federal highway in Germany

B 11
- Bundesstraße 11

Route information
- Length: 312 km (194 mi)

Major junctions
- North end: Bayerisch Eisenstein
- South end: Krün

Location
- Country: Germany
- States: Bavaria

Highway system
- Roads in Germany; Autobahns; List; Federal; List; State; E-roads

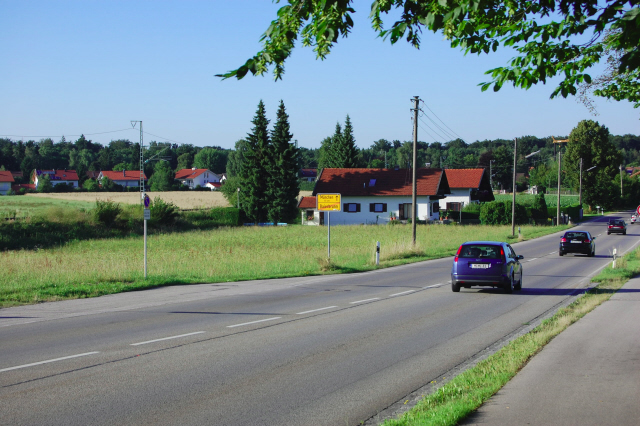
Bundesstraße 11 near Baierbrunn

The Bundesstraße 11 (abbr. B11) is a German federal highway. It leads from the Czech border near Bayerisch Eisenstein past Deggendorf, Landshut and Munich to Krün near Garmisch-Partenkirchen, where it connects to the Bundesstraße 2. It is the first regional federal highway in the German federal highway numbering system.

Between Deggendorf and Ergolding, the Bundesstraße 11 has been replaced by the Bundesautobahn 92. Northward, the road originally went over the Ruselabsatz, a 855-metre-high (2,805 ft) mountain pass. This strip of road was characterized by steep ascents and in winter the road was often impassable, especially for trucks. Due to this, the road has been rerouted to the west, where it is passable all year round.

== See also ==
Wolfratshauser Straße
