= Hallertau =

Area in Bavaria, Germany

Coordinates: 48°38′05″N 11°46′29″E

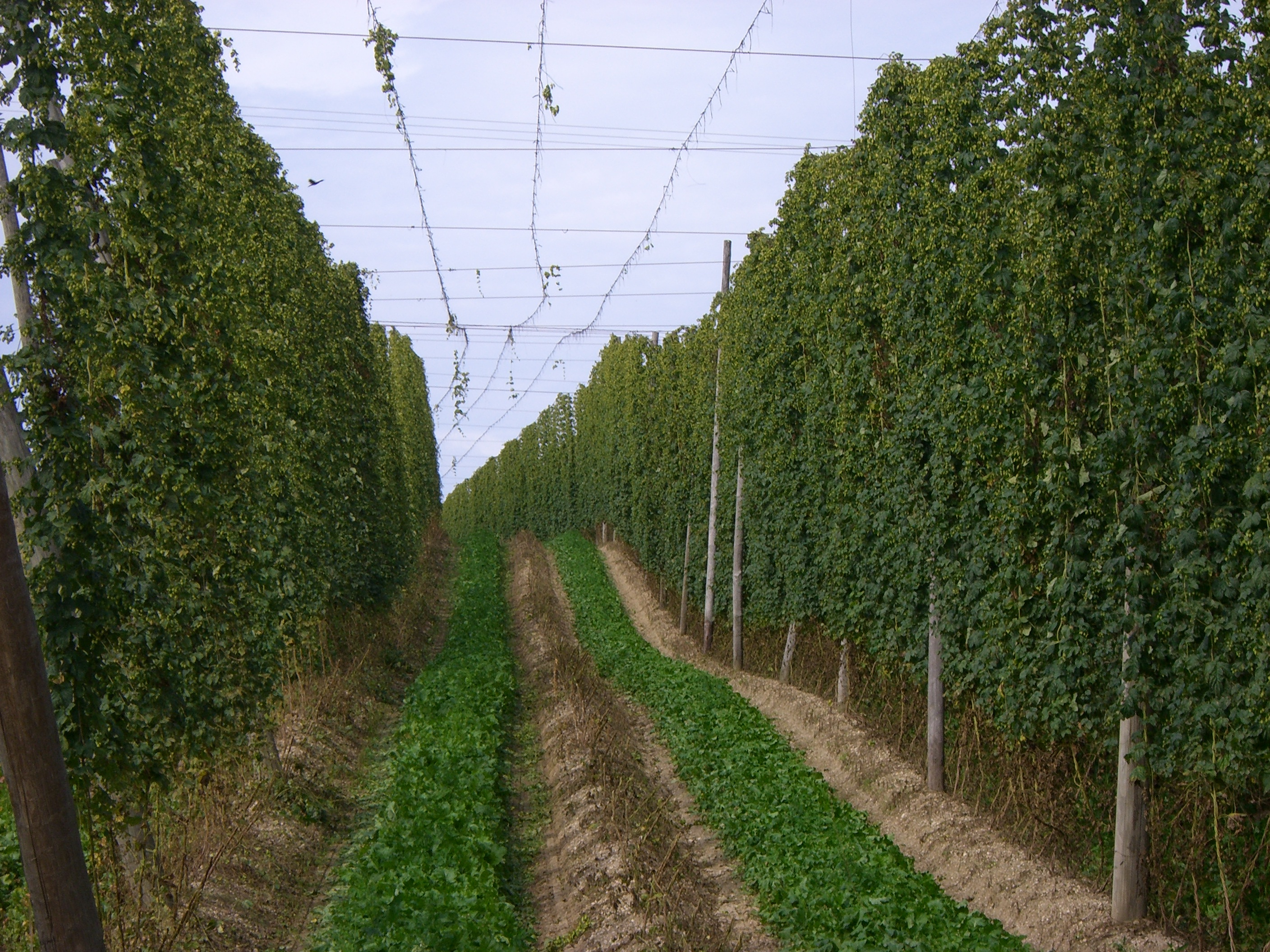
Hop garden in Au in der Hallertau

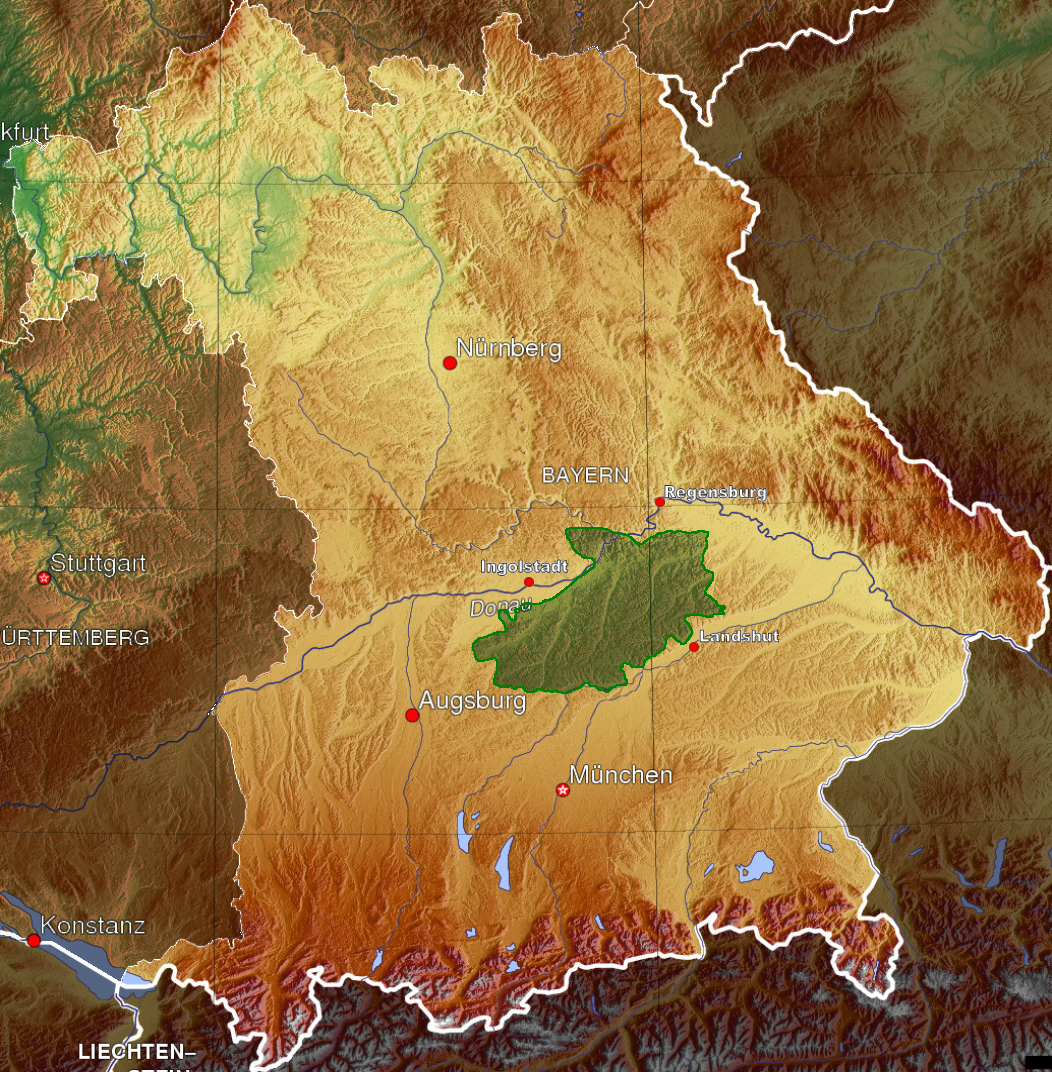
Hallertau area in Bavaria

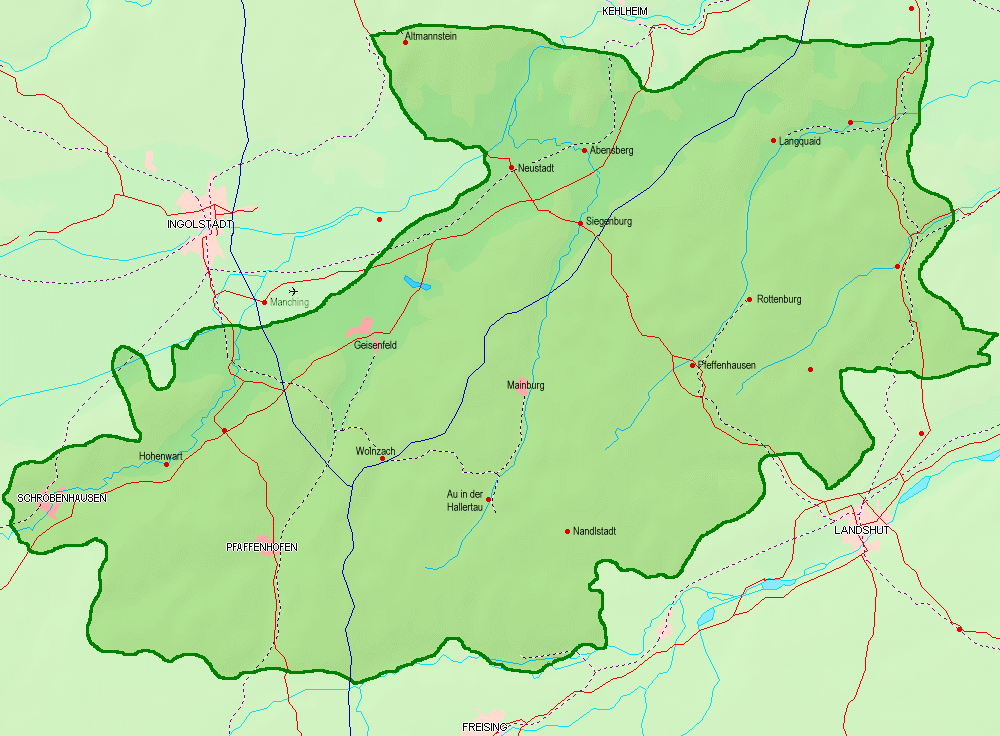
Current map of the Hallertau

The Hallertau (German pronunciation: [ˈhalɐtaʊ] or [halɐˈtaʊ]) or Holledau is an area in Bavaria, Germany. With an area of 178 km^{2}, it is listed as the largest continuous hop-planting area in the world. According to the International Hop Growing Convention, Germany produces roughly one third of the world's hops (used as flavoring and stabilizers during beer brewing), over 80% of which are grown in the Hallertau.

Hallertau is roughly located between the cities of Ingolstadt, Kelheim, Landshut, Moosburg, Freising and Schrobenhausen. The region is defined by the hop-planting area in Bavaria. It is divided into several seal districts:

- Abensberg
- Altmannstein
- Au in der Hallertau
- Geisenfeld
- Hohenwart
- Langquaid
- Mainburg
- Nandlstadt
- Neustadt an der Donau
- Pfaffenhofen an der Ilm
- Pfeffenhausen
- Rottenburg an der Laaber
- Siegenburg
- Wolnzach

== Famous citizens ==
- Johannes Aventinus (4 July 1477 – 9 January 1534), a Bavarian Renaissance humanist, historian, and philologist.
- Christoph Thomas Scheffler (December 20, 1699 – January 25, 1756), a Bavarian painter of the rococo period.
- Roider Jackl (17 June 1906 – 8 May 1975) was a Bavarian performer, singer, and folk singer

== See also ==
- Hop Research Center Hüll
