= Two Hearted River =

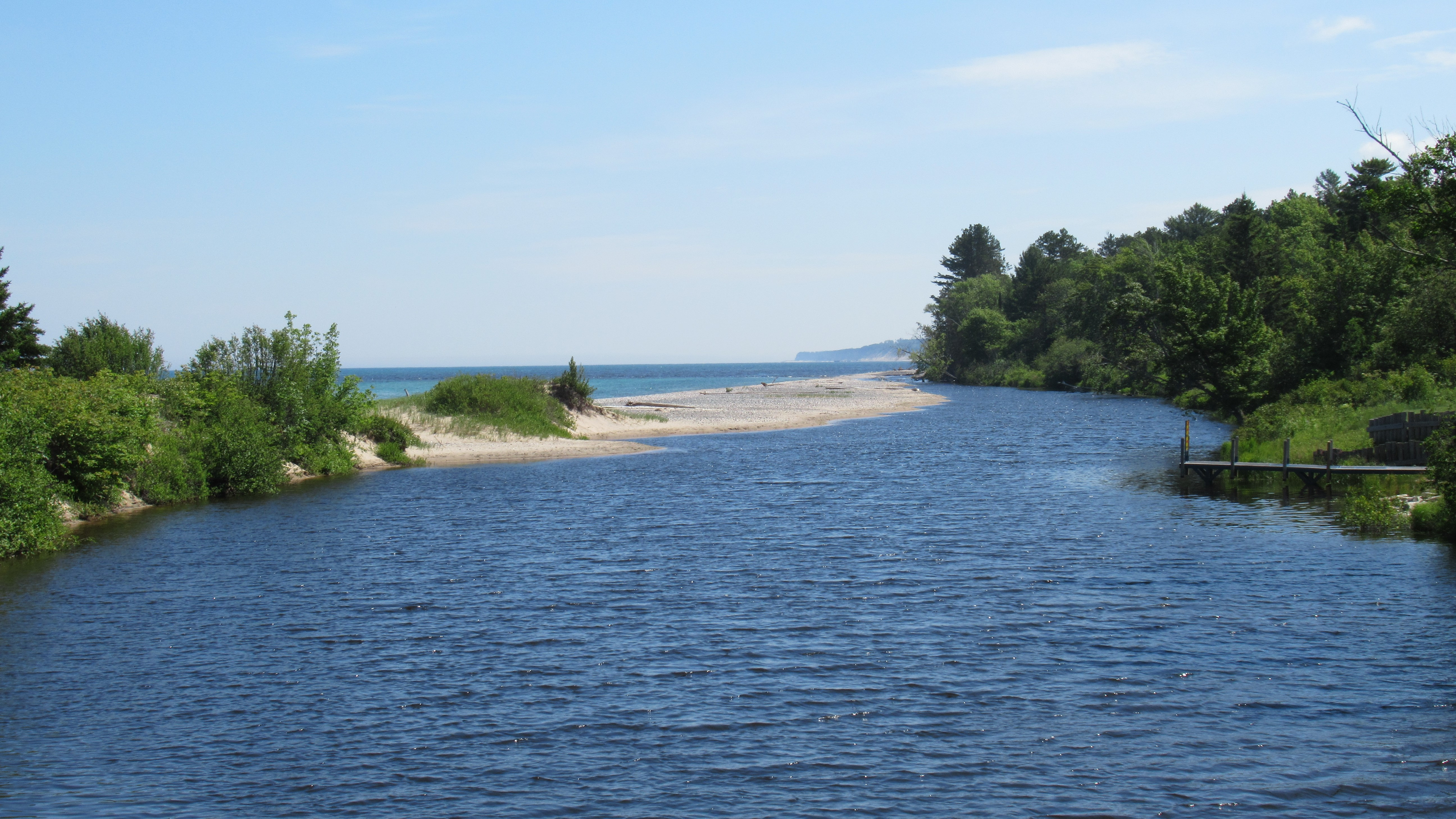
- River mouth at Lake Superior

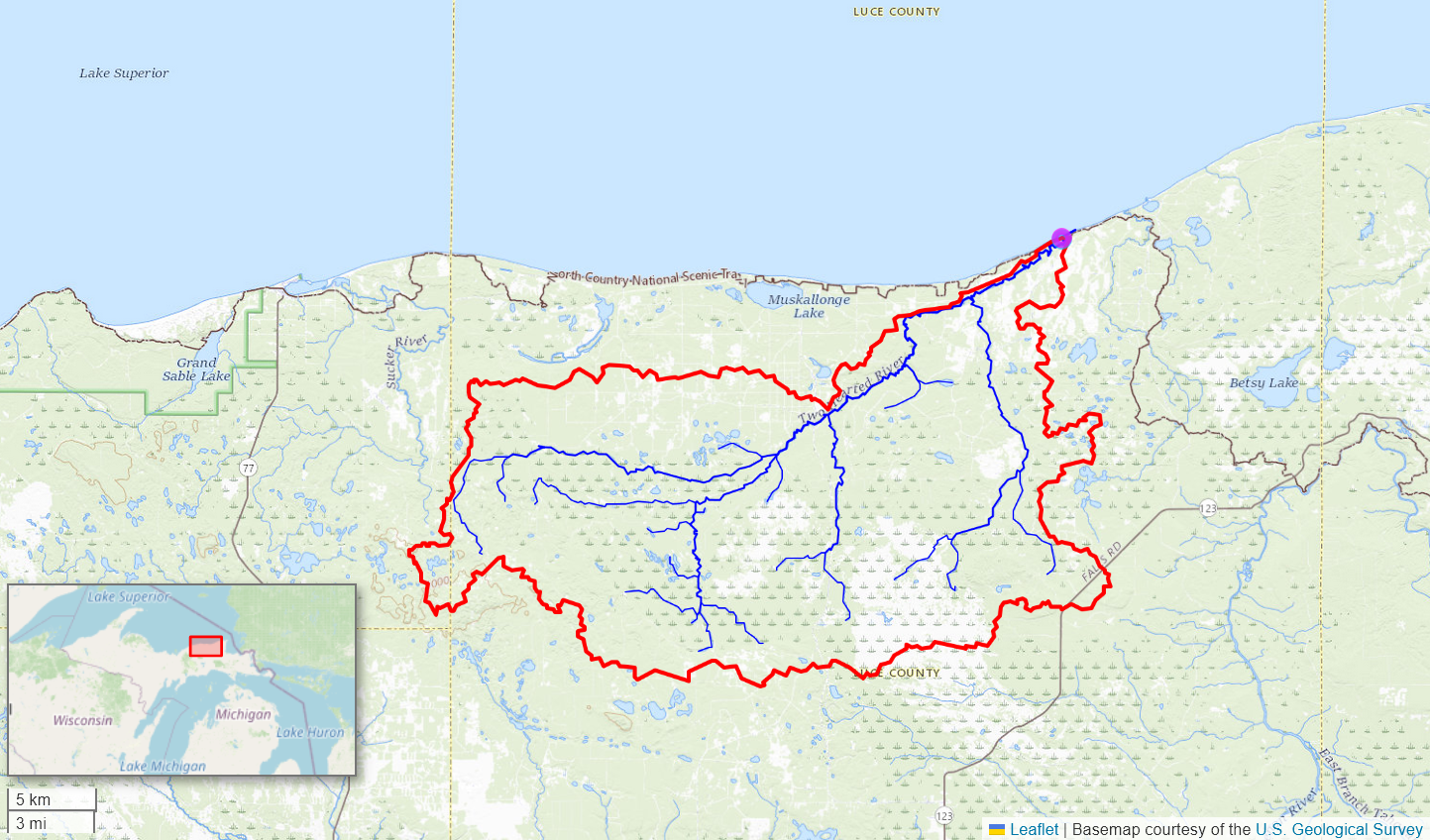
- Map of the Two Hearted River watershed

- Location within the state of Michigan

Physical characteristics
- Source
  - location: Luce County, Michigan
  - coordinates: 46°35′29″N 85°37′48″W
- Mouth
  - location: Lake Superior
  - coordinates: 46°42′07″N 85°24′44″W
- Length: 23.6 mi (38.0 km)

Life Saving Station
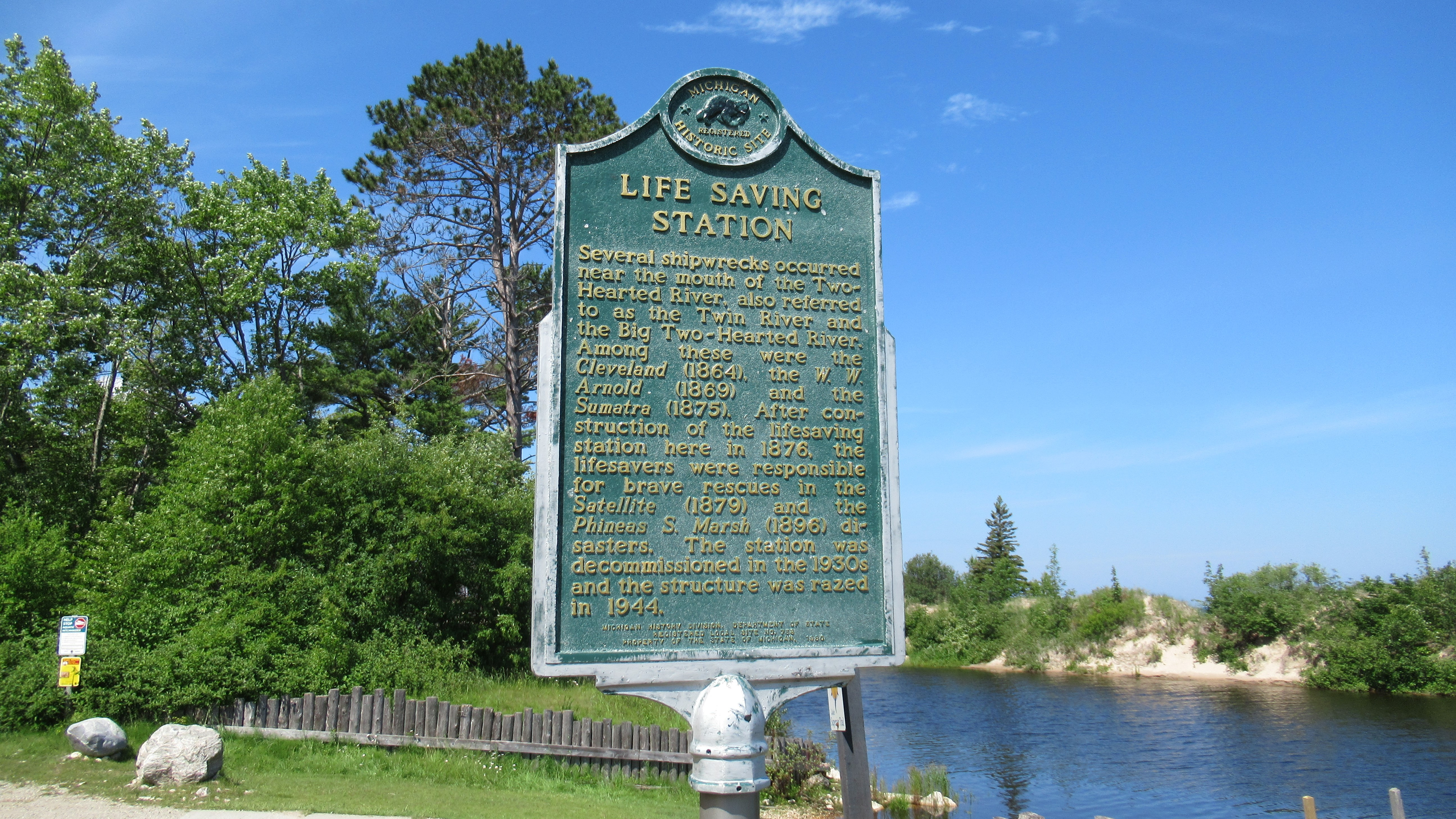
- Interactive map of Life Saving Station
- 46°41′56″N 85°25′18″W
- Location: Mouth of the Two Hearted River; McMillan Township, Michigan

History
- Built: 1876
- Demolished: 1944

Michigan State Historic Site
- Designated: December 12, 1979

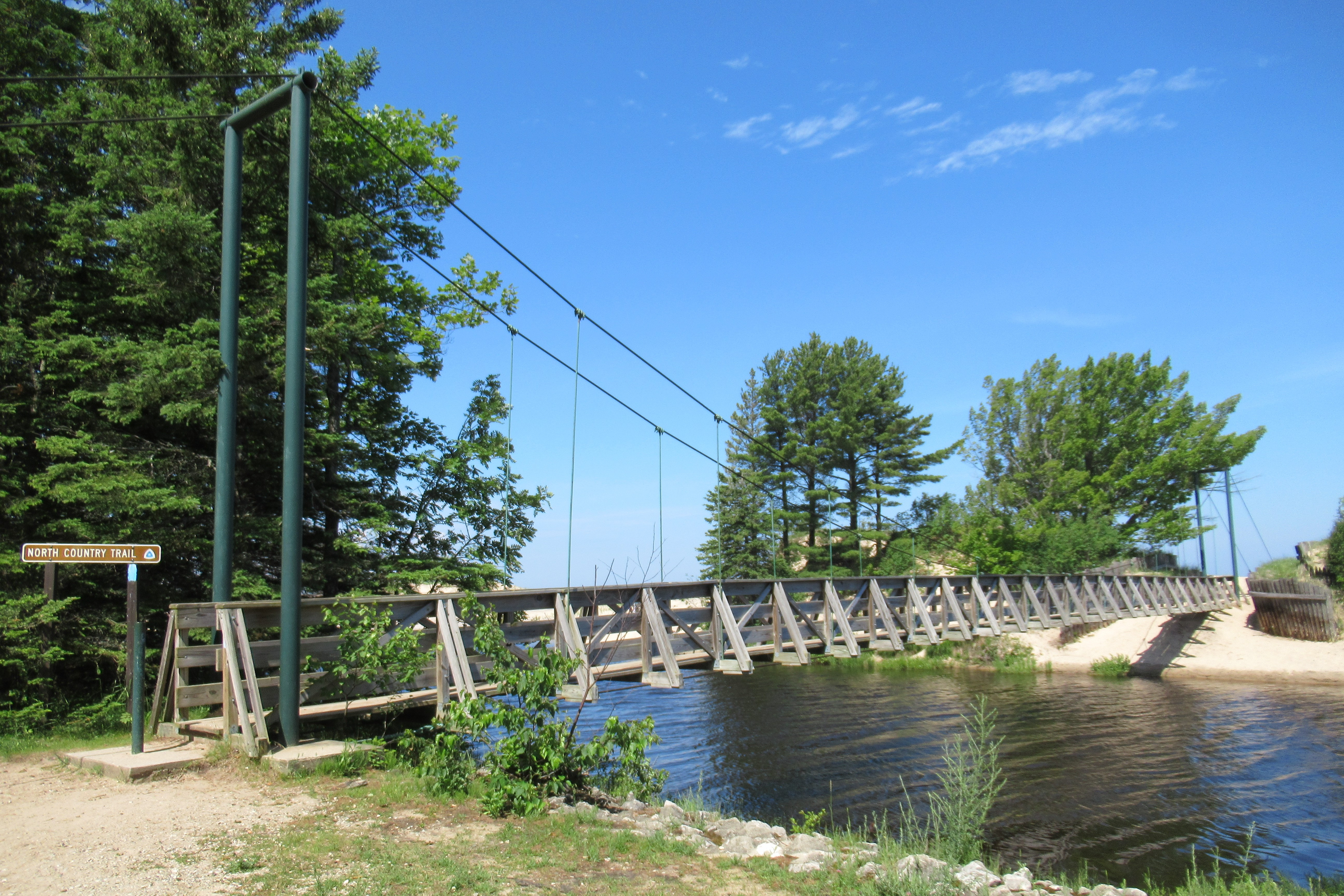
The North Country Trail crossing a bridge near the mouth of the Two Hearted River

The Two Hearted River is a river in the eastern Upper Peninsula of the U.S. state of Michigan. It is located entirely within McMillan Township in Luce County.

The river runs approximately 23.6 miles (38.0 km) through forested wilderness, and drains into Lake Superior. It rises in several short branches in northeastern Luce County, about 15 miles (24 km) southeast of Grand Marais. The north and west branches meet approximately 8 miles (13 km) south-southeast of Muskallonge Lake State Park. The main branch flows generally northeast, approaching Lake Superior at a sharp angle. It enters the lake approximately 10 miles (16 km) east of Deer Park.

The Little Two Hearted River has its river mouth about 2 miles (3.2 km) to the east of Two Hearted River. The North Country Trail crosses near the mouth of the Two Hearted River along Lake Superior.

== Natural history ==
=== Geology and landforms ===
The basin lies on the northern Lake Superior lakeplain with sandy and silty glacial sediments and extensive peat wetlands. A gentle gradient produces oxbows, point bars, and seasonal backwaters; near the mouth, shifting coastal sands can deflect or braid the outlet depending on lake level and storms.

=== Plants and wildlife ===
Upland forests include northern hardwoods with conifers such as white pine, hemlock, and spruce–fir. Riparian areas feature alder thickets, cedar swamps, and sedge meadows. Spring inputs and canopy shading support cold- to cool-water fishes in upper segments, while the mouth and nearshore of Lake Superior host seasonal movements of coastal species typical of the eastern Upper Peninsula.

== Indigenous history and use ==
The river lies within the homelands of the Anishinaabe. Nineteenth-century treaties (notably 1836 and 1842) established ceded territories in which signatory nations reserved rights to hunt, fish, and gather. Contemporary mapping by the Great Lakes Indian Fish & Wildlife Commission shows these treaty areas encompassing present-day Luce County and the adjoining Lake Superior coast.

== History ==
A Michigan Historic Marker commemorates the Two-Hearted Life-Saving Station built in 1876 at the river mouth. It was a simple two-story building with a small lookout tower manned by six to eight volunteer surfmen who conducted rescues of the Satellite (1879) and the Phineas S. Marsh (1896). The station, along with the rest of the United States Life-Saving Service, was integrated into the U.S. Coast Guard in 1915, decommissioned in the 1930s, and its structures were razed in 1944.

== Popular culture ==
- American author Ernest Hemingway wrote a two-part short story titled "Big Two-Hearted River" which details a fly fishing trip taken by Nick Adams.
- Bell's Brewery, a craft brewery based in Kalamazoo, Michigan, brews an India Pale Ale called Two Hearted Ale, with a graphic that features the river.

== See also ==
- List of lifesaving stations in Michigan
- Little Two Hearted River
