= Worthington's White Shield =

British beer brand

- Type: Beer
- Manufacturer: Molson Coors
- Distributor: Molson Coors
- Origin: Burton upon Trent, England
- Introduced: 1829
- Alcohol by volume: 5.6%
- Colour: rusty orange/golden

Worthington's White Shield (5.6% ABV) was an India pale ale (IPA) available principally in bottle conditioned form.

White Shield was first brewed by the Worthington Brewery in Burton upon Trent in 1829, primarily for export to the British Empire. Worthington merged with local rival Bass in 1927, which was itself taken over by Coors in 2002.

White Shield won the CAMRA Champion Bottled Beer of Britain Gold award three times, more than any other beer.

MolsonCoors announced that production of the beer would end in August 2023.

== Production ==
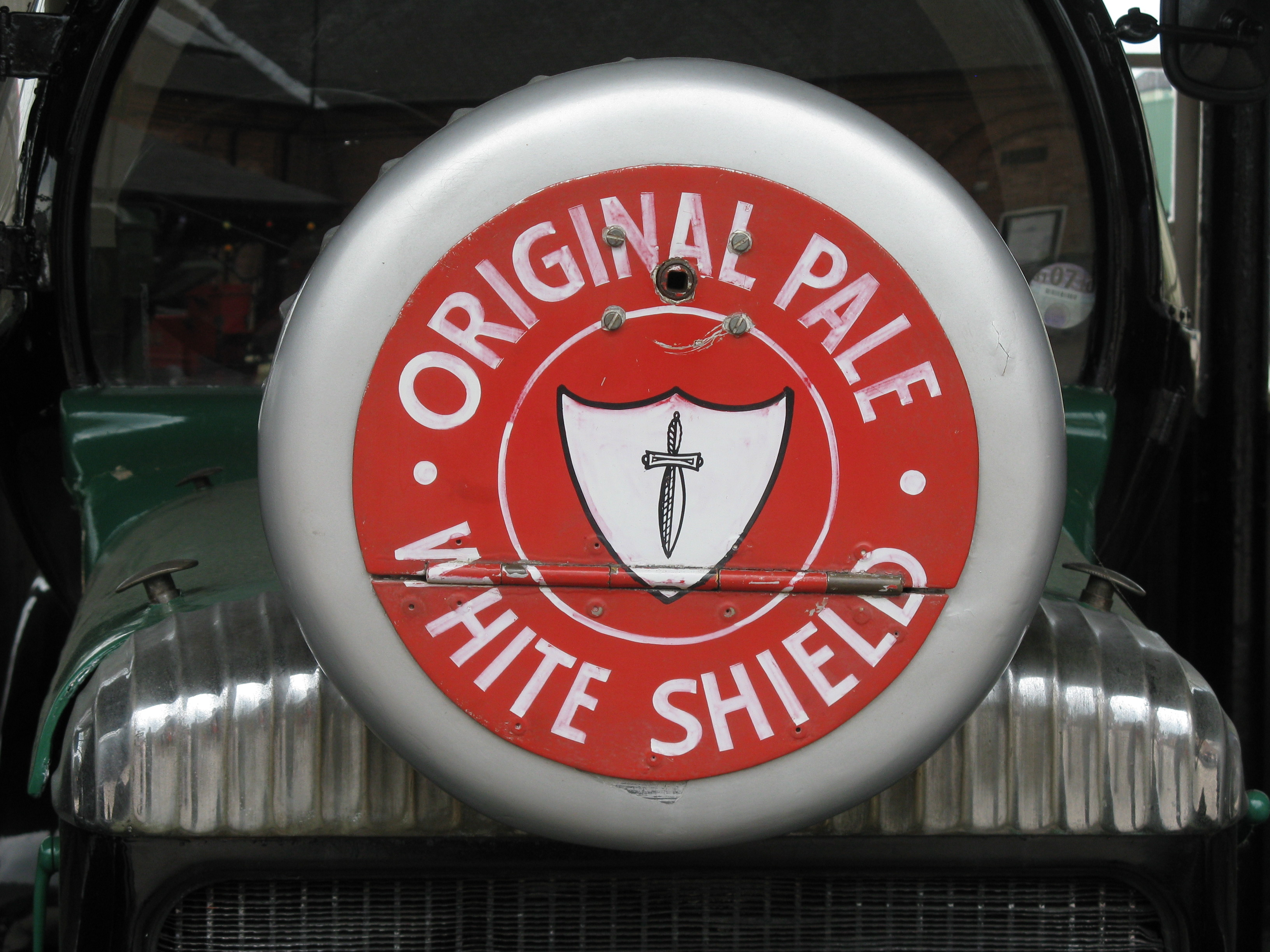
The 1920s era White Shield logo, as depicted on a car

White Shield was generally available as a bottle conditioned beer, although it was periodically available in cask conditioned form.

White Shield was brewed using pale malt and a small amount of crystal malt. The hops used were Challenger, Fuggles and Northdown. Different yeasts were used for primary and secondary fermentation. After primary fermentation, the beer was bulk conditioned for three weeks. Once packaged, it was matured in the bottle for a month before being sent out for distribution. Molson Coors claimed that the beer would continue to mature in the bottle for up to three years. Former brewer Steve Wellington described the product in 2011 as "pretty much unchanged since appearing first in 1829".

== History ==
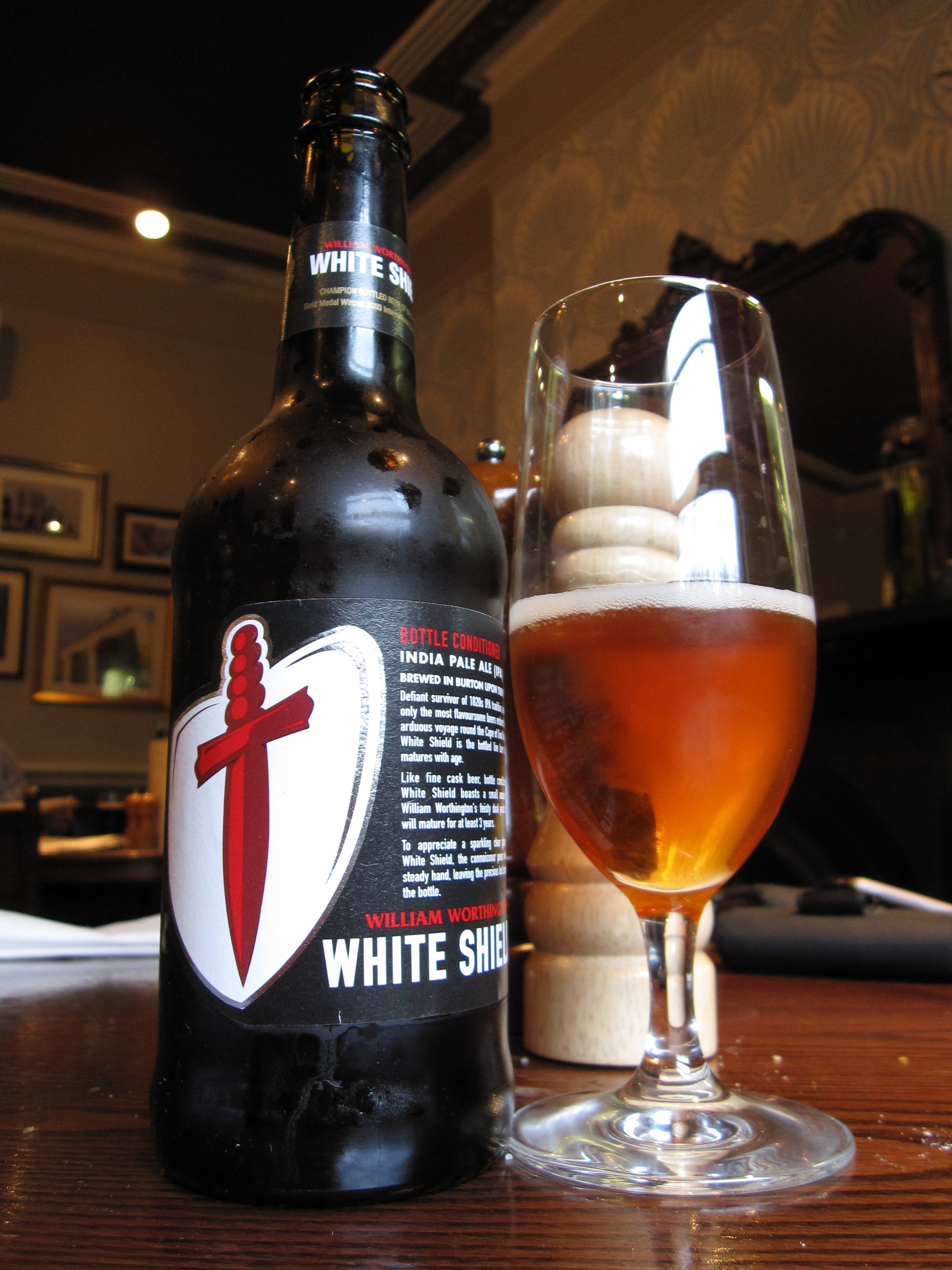
Worthington's White Shield

Worthington launched East India Pale Ale, their first IPA, in 1829. It was exported to British expatriates across the Empire, mostly officers and civil servants, as the soldiers tended to drink porter, which was more affordable. The growth of the railway network allowed for increased distribution of the beer throughout the United Kingdom. The beer was brewed using the Burton Union system.

The White Shield logo was introduced from the 1870s, and by the end of the nineteenth century the beer took on this name with drinkers. Worthington officially renamed their India Pale Ale White Shield from 1950.

92,000 barrels of White Shield were brewed in 1952–53. Bass announced that White Shield would be discontinued in 1961: it was unpopular with many publicans as it had to be stored at a certain temperature and could not be served chilled. Bass ultimately reversed their decision, but just 15,000 barrels were brewed in 1965. Bass lowered the alcohol content of the beer in 1967.

White Shield found renewed popularity in the early 1970s as the demand for real ale grew, but lost this position as the availability of cask ale improved.

Bass relocated production from Burton to their Hope & Anchor brewery in Sheffield in 1981, and the beer ceased to be brewed using the Burton Union method. Production in 1988 totalled 12,000 barrels. The Hope & Anchor brewery was closed down in 1992, and production was moved to Cape Hill in Birmingham, before production was contracted to King and Barnes of Horsham in Sussex in 1998. By this time, production was down to just 1,000 barrels a year, and the beer's long-term survival was in doubt. The King and Barnes brewery closed down in 2000, and production moved to the Bass owned White Shield microbrewery in Burton upon Trent.

In 2000 a total of 500 barrels were produced. In 2010, production was moved to the newly constructed William Worthington's Brewery, a microbrewery based at the National Brewery Centre in Burton. In 2012, increasing demand saw White Shield production moved to the main Coors brewery in Burton.

Roger Protz reported that White Shield was the highest-selling bottle-conditioned beer in Britain in 2013. However, in 2018 he suggested that distribution of the beer had declined. Production was ended in August 2023.
