= Pete Brown (writer) =

British writer (born 1968)

- Born: 1968 (age 57–58); Barnsley, West Riding of Yorkshire, England
- Education: University of St Andrews
- Occupations: Author, essayist, beer expert
- Writing career
- Period: 2003–present
- Subjects: Beer, Travel, Cultural History
- Notable works: Man Walks Into a Pub (2004); Three Sheets to the Wind (2007); Hops and Glory (2009); Shakespeare's Local (2012)

Peter "Pete" Shaun Brown (born 1968) is an English writer who has written on the subject of beer and drinking cultures around the world. He is the "beer columnist" for the Sunday Times magazine.

== Life and career ==
Brown was born in Barnsley to a working class family, and raised in the nearby village of Staincross. He attended the University of St Andrews. He relocated to London in 1991, where he worked in the advertising industry, writing strategy for Stella Artois and Heineken.

His debut book, Man Walks Into a Pub, a history of drink and drinking, was published in 2003. His second effort, Three Sheets to the Wind, was published in 2006 and explores the differences and similarities in drinking cultures around the world. Brown travelled 45,000 miles and visited 13 countries researching the book. In Brown's third book, Hops and Glory, he retraces the historical journey of India Pale Ale, from Burton-on-Trent in England to Kolkata, India, taking a specially brewed barrel of the beer along with him.

Brown has also appeared on television as an authority on beer, as well giving talks and lectures on the subject. Brown was named the British Guild of Beer Writers' Beer Writer of the Year in 2009, 2012, 2016 and 2021. He was Chair of the British Guild of Beer Writers from 2017 to 2020.

Brown lives in Norwich.

== Bibliography ==
- Man Walks Into a Pub: A Sociable History of Beer (2004)
- Three Sheets to the Wind: One Man's Quest for the Meaning of Beer (2007)
- Hops and Glory: One Man's Search for the Beer that Built the British Empire (2009)
- Shakespeare's Local: Six Centuries of History Seen Through One Extraordinary Pub – Radio 4 Book of the Week
- World's Best Cider: Taste, Tradition and Terroir, from Somerset to Seattle (2013) (with Bill Bradshaw) – Winner of the Fortnum & Mason Drink Book Award
- The Pub: A Cultural Institution from Country Inns to Craft Beer Bars and Corner Locals (2016) – Winner of the Fortnum & Mason Drink Book Award
- The Apple Orchard: The Story of Our Most English Fruit (2016) – Radio 4 Book of the Week, shortlisted for the 2016 André Simon Food & Drink Book Award
- Miracle Brew: Adventures in the Nature of Beer (2017) – Shortlisted for the 2017 André Simon Food and Drink Book Award
- Pie Fidelity: In Defence of British Food (2019)
- Craft: An Argument (2020)
- Beer By Design: The Art of Good Beer Branding (2020)
- Clubland: How the Working Men's Club Shaped Britain (2022)
