= Bell's Brewery =

Brewing company in Comstock, Michigan, US

Bell's Brewery, Inc.
- Interactive map of Bell's Brewery, Inc.
- Location: 8938 Krum Ave, Comstock, Michigan, United States
- Coordinates: 42.284°N 85.454°W
- Opened: 1985
- Annual production volume: 310,000 US beer barrels (360,000 hL) in 2014
- Owner: Lion (Kirin)
- Employees: 600
- Distribution: 50 States, Washington D.C., & Puerto Rico
- Website: bellsbeer.com

Active beers
| Name | Type |
| Amber Ale | American amber ale |
| No, Yeah | Golden Ale |
| Kalamazoo Stout | American stout |
| Lager for the Lakes | American Lager |
| Light Hearted Ale | Low-cal American IPA |
| Hazy Hearted | Hazy IPA |
| Porter | Robust porter |
| Two Hearted Ale | American IPA |
| Big Hearted Ale | Imperial IPA |

Seasonal beers
| Name | Type |
| Best Brown Ale | Brown ale |
| Oberon Ale | American wheat ale |
| Oberon Light | citrus wheat light ale |
| Oberon Eclipse | coriander/citrus wheat ale |
| Hopslam | Double IPA |
| Octoberfest | Märzen |
| Christmas Ale | Scotch Ale |
| Expedition Stout | Russian Imperial Stout |
| Cherry Stout | Stout (brewed with Montmorency cherries) |
| Special Double Cream Stout | Sweet Stout |
| Smitten | Golden Rye Pale Ale |
| The Oracle | West Coast-style Double India Pale Ale |
| Wedding Ale | Imperial Wheat Ale |

Bell's Brewery, Inc. is an American craft brewing company operating out of Comstock and Kalamazoo, Michigan. It consists of a brewpub and restaurant, the Bell's Eccentric Cafe, as well as the Bell's General Store, which sells Bell's clothing and merchandise, beer to go (including active beers, seasonal beers, Kalamazoo store exclusive beers, as well as a Growler/Crowler bar), and homebrew kits at its Kalamazoo location (355 East Kalamazoo Avenue).

Bell's was initially a homebrewing store in 1983, and began producing beer in 1985. It is the oldest existing craft brewery in Michigan and is the oldest craft brewery east of Colorado in the United States. In 2021, it was the 6th largest craft brewery in the United States, and was the largest independently owned brewery in Michigan.

Founder Larry James Bell sold the company to the subsidiary of the Japanese Kirin beverage group Lion (an Australian producer of alcoholic beverages) at the end of 2021. The company had also owned Upper Hand Brewery, a separately operated division in Escanaba, Michigan, which was sold to California-based Seven Beverages, Inc. in 2024.

== History ==
Larry Bell incorporated the Kalamazoo Brewing Company, Inc., in 1983 as a homebrewing supply shop in Kalamazoo, Michigan. In September 1985, the company began to sell its own beer, brewed in a 15-US-gallon (57 L) soup kettle and fermented in open fermenters covered with plastic wrap. The company produced 135 barrels in its first year. In 1993 the company opened an adjacent brewpub, the Eccentric Café.

In 2003, Bell's opened an additional brewing facility in nearby Comstock, Michigan. The company legally changed its name in 2006 to Bell's Brewery, Inc., reflecting the name by which it was popularly known. A larger production facility in Comstock opened in 2012, increasing the company's brewing capacity from 180,000 barrels to 500,000 barrels per year.

In late 2012, the Bell family repurchased all stock held by outside investors, returning the company to full family ownership.

The company opened Upper Hand Brewery in the Upper Peninsula city of Escanaba in 2014. This brewery produces UPA (American pale ale), Upper Hand Light (lager), Yooper Ale (pale ale), Escanaba Black Beer (black ale), Upper Hand IPA (India pale ale), and a variety of seasonal and specialty brews. Initially sold only in the U.P., it began limited distribution in the Lower Peninsula in 2020. Upper Hand Brewery was sold to California-based Seven Beverages, Inc. in 2024.

In 2021, Larry Bell sold his controlling share of the company to the Japanese Kirin beverage group subsidiary, Lion, an Australia-based international producer of alcoholic beverages that also owns Colorado-based New Belgium Brewing Company.

== Beers ==
Bells produces nine year-round packaged beers, seasonal beers, and numerous limited-production beers, most of which are Kalamazoo Exclusive beers, available only at the Bell's General Store.

Notable Bell's Beers
| Name | Style | ABV % | IBU | Notes |
|---|---|---|---|---|
| Amber Ale | American amber ale | 5.8 | 32 | Year-round |
| Hopsolution Ale | Double IPA | 8 | 60 | Limited Specialty |
| Kalamazoo Stout | American stout | 6 | 51 | Year-round |
| Lager of the Lakes | Bohemian-style Pilsner | 5 | 34 | Discontinued |
| Light Hearted Ale | Low-calorie American-style IPA | 3.7 | 36 | Year-round |
| Official | Hazy IPA | 6.4 | 55 | Limited Specialty |
| Porter | Robust porter | 5.6 | 33 | Year-round |
| Two Hearted Ale | American-style IPA | 7 | 60 | Year-round |
| Christmas Ale | Scotch Ale | 7.5 | Unknown | Seasonal (September to December) |
| Best Brown Ale | American brown ale | 5.8 | 34 | Limited Specialty |
| Bright White Ale | Belgian wheat ale | 5 | 21 | Limited Specialty |
| Oberon Ale | American wheat ale | 5.8 | 26 | Seasonal (March to September) |
| Arabicadabra | Coffee milk stout | 5.5 | 30 | Limited Specialty |
| Blackbeard's Bear Hug | American imperial stout | 14.4 | 34 | Limited Specialty |
| Cherry Stout | Stout | 7 | 17 | Specialty |
| Expedition Stout | Russian imperial stout | 10.5 | 77 | Specialty |
| Octoberfest | Märzen | 5.5 | 24 | Seasonal (late July through October) |
| Double Two Hearted Ale | American double IPA | 11 | 80 | Limited Specialty |
| Hopslam Ale | Double IPA | 10 | 65 | Limited Specialty (released early January) |
| Pooltime Ale | Belgian wheat ale | 5.2 | 23.2 | Limited Specialty |

=== Honors ===
Two Hearted IPA (an India Pale Ale named for the Two Hearted River in the Upper Peninsula of Michigan) has been ranked by the American Homebrewers Association as one of the best beers in the United States, in its magazine Zymurgy. They rated it #2 from 2010 to 2016, and #1 from 2017 to 2019. Hopslam, a double IPA, is very popular among craft beer drinkers and sparks a backlog of demand at its yearly seasonal release; it has also placed within the Top 10.

=== Availability ===
Bell's brews its Two Hearted IPA, Hazy Hearted IPA, Big Hearted IPA, Light Hearted IPA, Amber Ale, Porter, Lager for the Lakes, No Yeah, and Kalamazoo Stout year-round. Many other beers are sold seasonally, such as Oberon Ale from late March through September (year-round in Florida, Arizona, and Puerto Rico), Oberon Eclipse in September through February, Octoberfest in late July through October, Hopslam in early January, and Christmas Ale in November and December. Specialty stouts such as Expedition Stout and Special Double Cream Stout are released in the autumn months. Additional beers are sold on tap at its brewpub.

Bell's beer is distributed in all fifty states, the District of Columbia, and Puerto Rico.

== Legal issues ==
In 1998, Bell's changed the name of its flagship summer beer from Solsun to Oberon as a result of legal action by Mexican brewing company Cerveceria Cuauhtemoc Moctezuma, makers of a beer with a similar name: El Sol ("The Sun").

Bell's was temporarily pulled from the Illinois market in October 2006 when Union Beverage (its distributor to Chicago) attempted to sell its distribution rights to a competitor that Larry Bell did not trust to adequately represent the brewery's full product line. In 2007, the company re-entered the market through new distributors by creating two new beers: Kalamazoo Royal Amber Ale and Kalamazoo Hopsoulution. In August 2008, Bell's was able to return its primary brands to the area, after Union Beverage's parent company quit the Illinois market.
