= Little Two Hearted River =

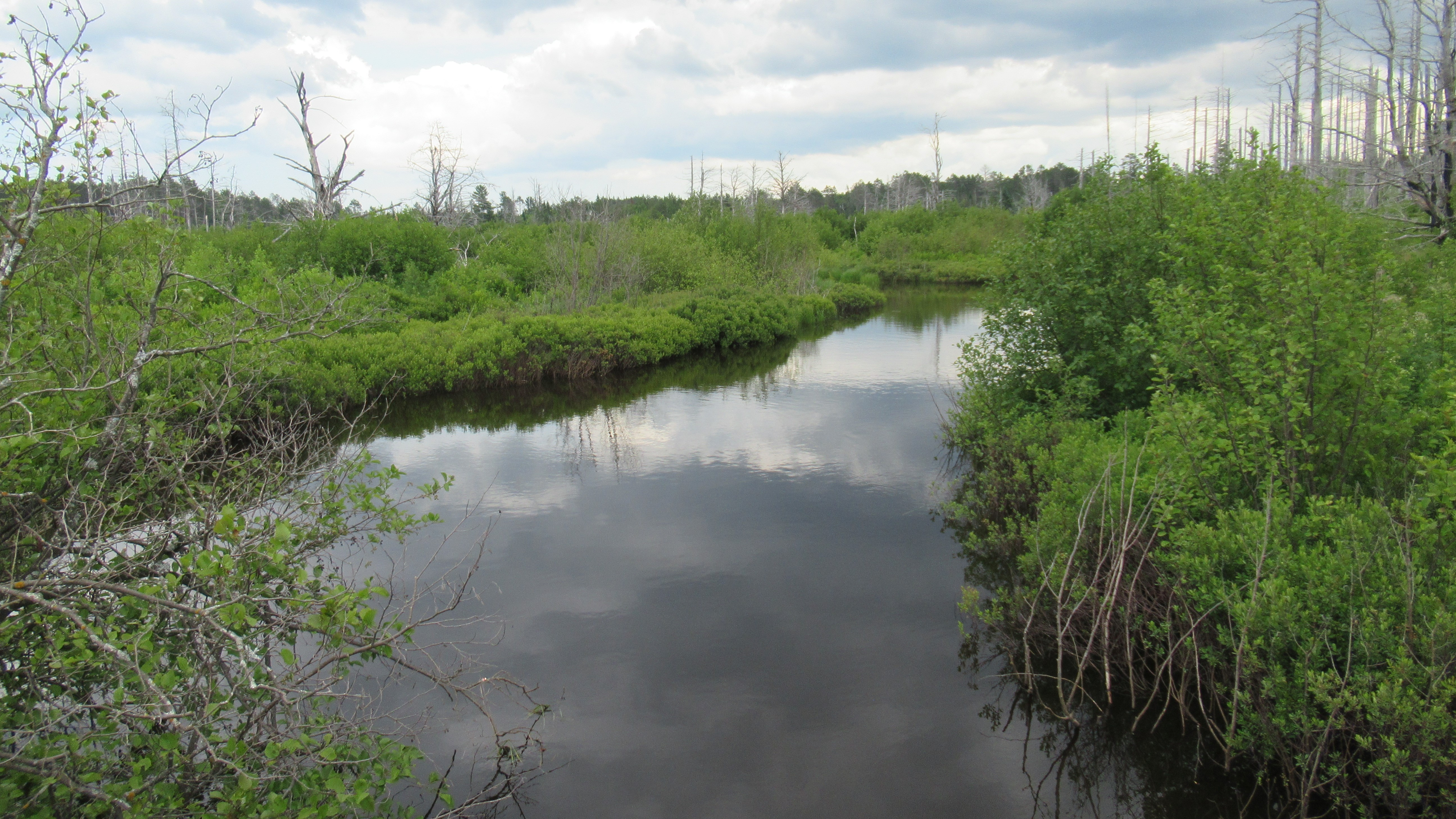
- Little Two Hearted River from County Road 412

- Location within the state of Michigan

Physical characteristics
- Source
  - location: Little Two Hearted Lakes
  - coordinates: 46°34′48″N 85°23′32″W
  - elevation: 712 feet (217 m)
- Mouth
  - location: Lake Superior
  - coordinates: 46°42′43″N 85°22′36″W
  - elevation: 602 feet (183 m)
- Length: 23.9 miles (38.5 km)

Basin features
- Waterbodies: Culthane Lake, Little Pike Lake, Pike Lake

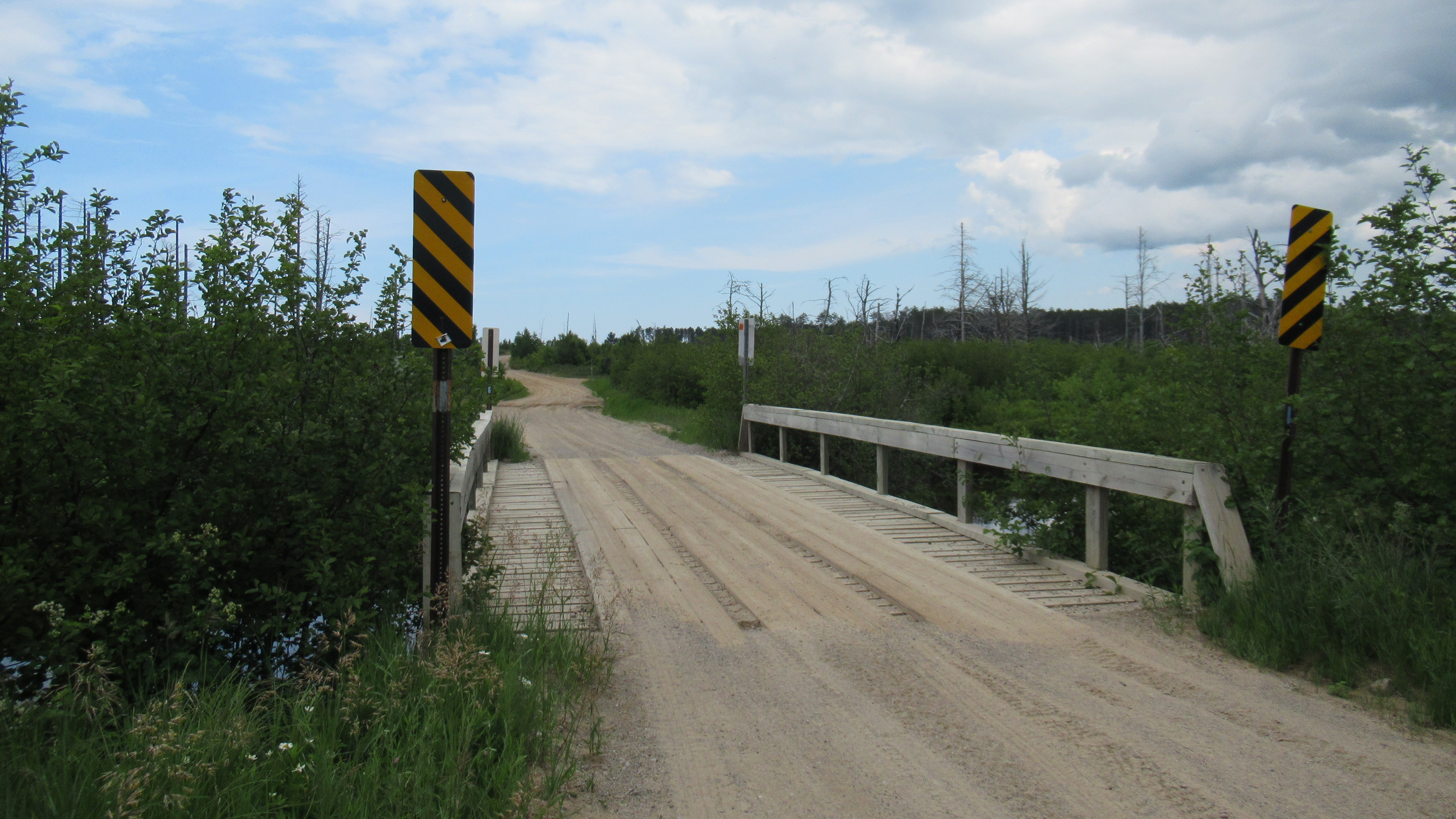
County Road 412 bridge crossing the Little Two Hearted River

The Little Two Hearted River is a 23.9-mile-long (38.5 km) river located entirely within Luce County in the U.S. state of Michigan. The river rises from its source at Little Two Hearted Lakes in Lake Superior State Forest and flows north into Lake Superior about 4.0 miles (6.4 km) east of the Two Hearted River.

The river is entirely located within McMillan Township and is passed over along County Road 412 travelling eastward from Pine Stump Junction to Crisp Point Light.

== See also ==
- List of rivers of Michigan
