= India pale ale =

Beer with high hop content

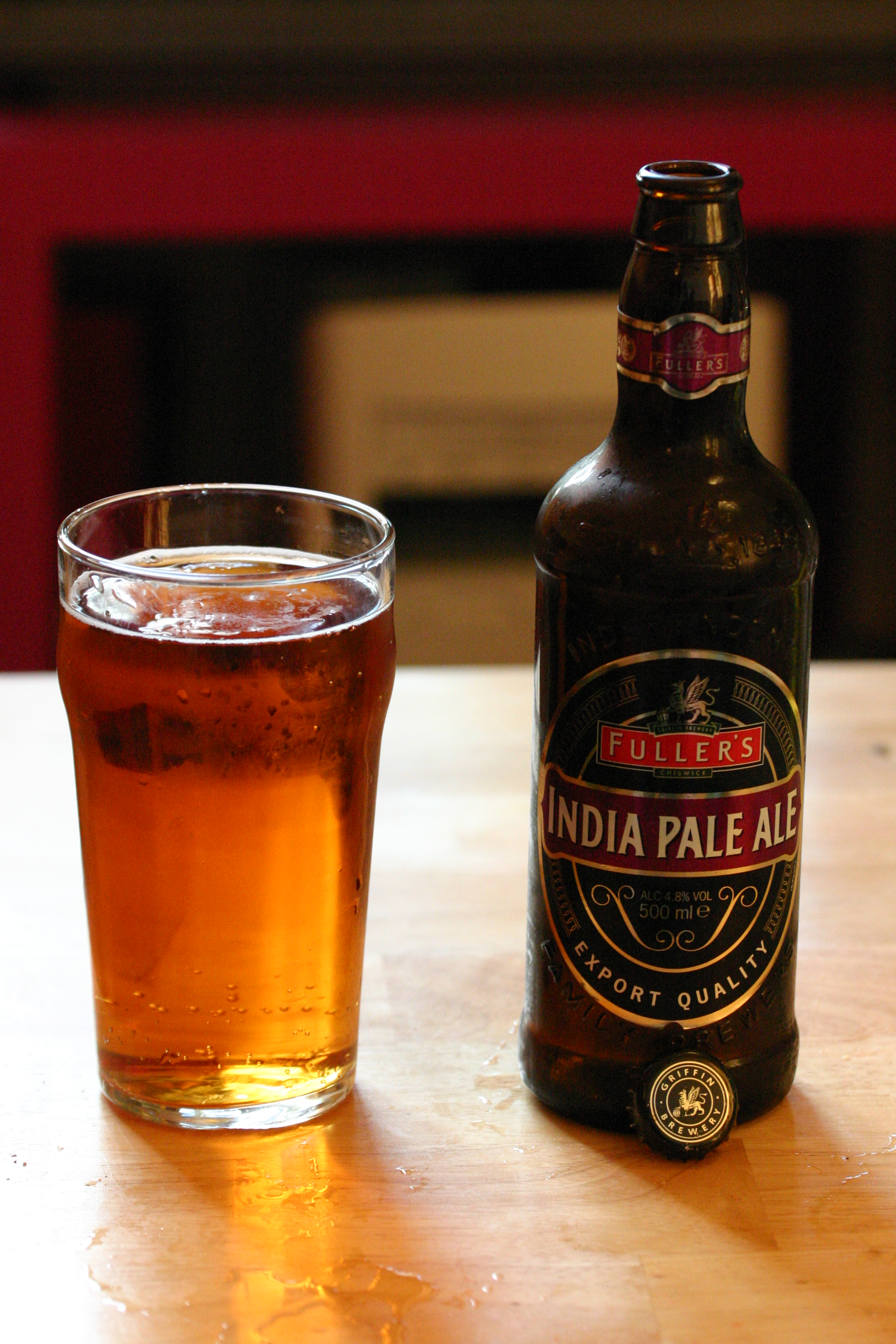
- Fuller's India pale ale
- Country of origin: United Kingdom
- Alcohol by volume: 4.5–20%
- Original gravity: 1.050–1.090
- Final gravity: 1.000–1.025

India pale ale (IPA) is a hoppy beer style within the broader category of pale ale. It originated in the United Kingdom, to be exported to India, which was under the control of the British East India Company until 1858. The higher hop content acted as a natural preservative, preventing the beer from spoiling during the long shipping voyage.

IPA declined in popularity in the late 19th and mid 20th centuries. Since the 1970s, it has regained significant popularity, being associated with homebrewing and craft beer.

== History ==
The pale ales of the early 18th century were lightly hopped and were quite different from modern pale ales. By the mid-18th century, pale ale was often brewed with a coke-fired malt, which produced less smoking and roasting of barley in the malting process, and hence produced a lighter hued pale ale. One variety was Old ale, a pale well-hopped brew popular among the landed gentry, who brewed it domestically; once brewed, it was intended to age in a cellar for two years.

Among the first brewers known to export beer to India was George Hodgson's Bow Brewery, on the Middlesex-Essex boundary. Its beers became popular among East India Company traders' provisions in the late 18th century for being two miles up the Lea from the East India Docks, (Note: The Bow Brewery was on the west bank, south of Bow bridge with a wharf opposite.) and Hodgson's liberal credit line of 18 months. Ships exported this beer to India, among them his old ale, which benefited exceptionally from conditions of the voyage and was highly regarded among its consumers in India. The brewery came into the control of Hodgson's son early in the next century. (Note: Mark Hodgson died in 1810, leaving the Bow Brewery in the care of a trust. His only surviving son, Frederick, took control of the brewery in 1819.)

Burton breweries lost their export market in Continental Europe, including Scandinavia and Russia, when the Napoleonic blockade was imposed, and were seeking a new export market for their beer.

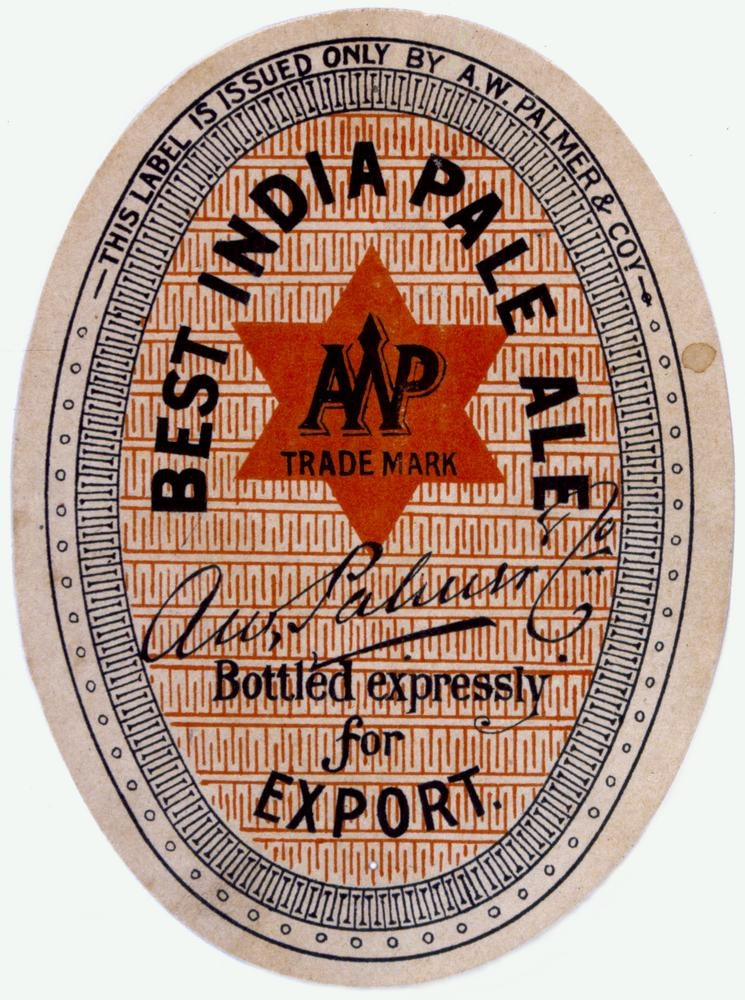
Best India Pale Ale, bottled expressly for export by A. W. Palmer & Co.

At the behest of the East India Company, Allsopp's brewery's chief maltser, Job Goodhead, developed a strongly-hopped pale ale in the style of Hodgson's for export to India. Other Burton brewers, including Bass and Salt and Co, followed Allsopp's lead, taking advantage of Burton water in brewing similar beers. (Note: The water of Burton on Trent contains a very high concentration of sulphate which accentuates the bitterness of beer. See Daniels, Foster, and Cornell.)

London East End brewer Charrington's trial shipments of hogsheads of "India Ale" to Madras and Calcutta in 1827 proved successful and a regular trade emerged with the key British agents and retailers: Griffiths & Co in Madras; Adam, Skinner and Co. in Bombay and Bruce, Allen & Co. in Calcutta.

Early IPAs were only slightly higher in alcohol than other beers brewed then, but more of the wort was fermented, meaning few residual sugars, and they were heavily hopped. While IPAs were formulated to survive long voyages by sea better than other styles of the time, porter was also successfully shipped to India and California.

By the 1860s, India pale ales were widely brewed in England, and they were much more attenuated and hopped than porters and ales.

Demand for the export style of pale ale, which had become known as "India pale ale", developed in England around 1840 and India pale ale became a popular product in England. In 1837, Hodgson's IPA typically cost 6/6 (32.5p; equivalent to £31 in 2025) for a dozen pint bottles, the same as Guinness Double Stout, 53% more than the 4/3 (21.25p; equivalent to £21) a dozen for those of porter. Some brewers dropped the term "India" in the late 19th century, but records indicated that these "pale ales" retained the features of earlier IPAs. American, Australian, and Canadian brewers manufactured beer with the label IPA before 1900, and records suggest that these beers were similar to English IPA of the era.

IPA style beers started being exported to other colonial countries, such as Australia and New Zealand, around this time with many breweries dropping the 'I' in 'IPA' and simply calling them Pale Ales or Export Pales. Kirkstall Brewery and many competitors sent much export beer across the world by steam ship to auction off to wholesalers upon arrival.

== United Kingdom ==
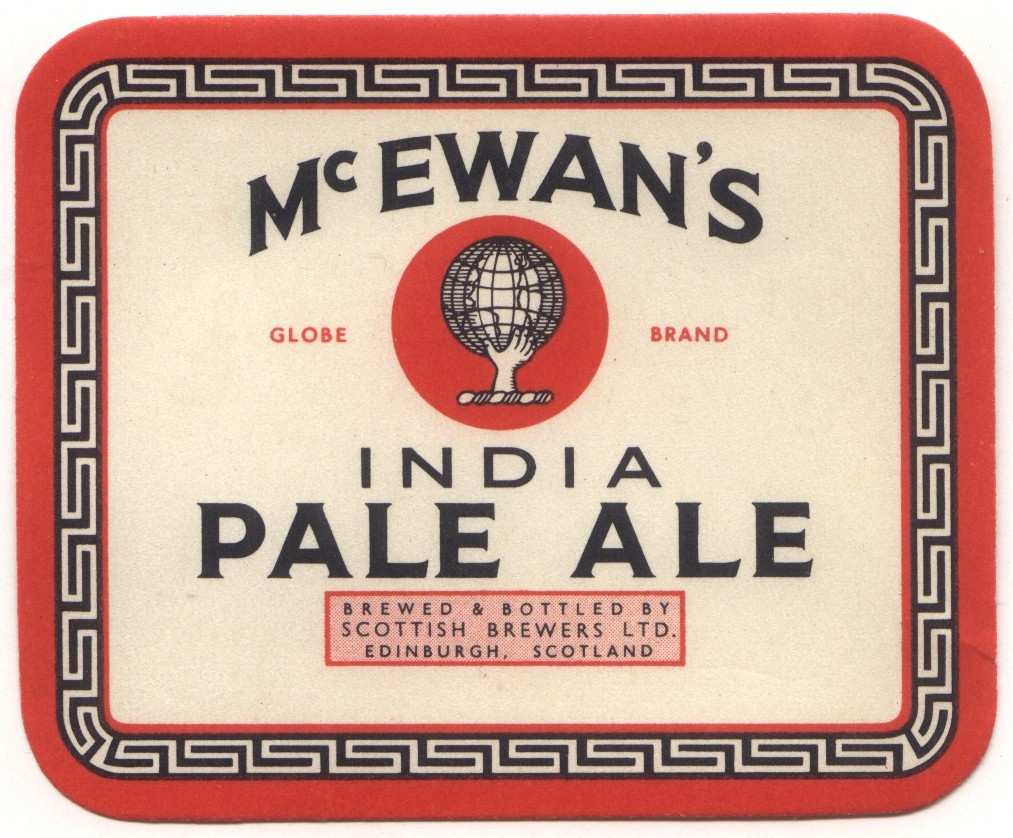
A 1930s label for McEwan's IPA

India pale ale was well known as early as 1815, but gained popularity in the British domestic market sometime before then. By World War I, IPA in Britain had diverged into two styles, the premium bottled IPAs of around 1.065 specific gravity and cask-conditioned draught IPAs which were among the weakest beers on the bar. For instance Bass was 1.065 OG and 6.4% ABV, but in 1912 Whitbread's draught IPA was 1.049 and less than 5% ABV, at a time when the average British beer was 1.055. Like all British beers, their strength declined during World War I and by 1923 Bass was 1.055 and Whitbread IPA was a bottled beer of 1.036 and 3.7% (compared to their standard X Mild at 1.042 and their draught bitter at 1.042). Greene King IPA (3.7%) and Charles Wells Eagle IPA (3.6%) are examples of IPAs in this tradition.

Worthington's White Shield is an example of a historic India Pale Ale, first brewed in 1829 principally for export to the British Empire. By the 1960s White Shield had become a cult drink brewed in small quantities for a dedicated following, but it found renewed popularity in the early 1970s when the demand for real ale grew in the UK.

The revival of IPA in modern times dates to a seminar on Burton pale ales organised by publican Mark Dorber at his pub, the White Horse, Parson's Green, in 1990. That led to a pale ale festival in 1992 and an IPA festival in 1993, for which Bass brewed a 7.2% beer inspired by Bass Continental, originally brewed for the Belgian market before World War II and based on Bass recipes going back to the 1850s. Dorber and Roger Protz then organised an IPA conference in 1994 at Whitbread's brewery in London, attended by brewers from both sides of the Atlantic. The influence of this meeting persists, for instance Brooklyn Brewery's East India IPA is based on the beer that Garrett Oliver took there.

In the 21st century, US-influenced IPA is one of the most popular beer styles in the UK. In 2019, Brewdog's Punk IPA was the country's best selling craft beer in the on-trade and Swannay's Muckle IPA won overall craft keg gold in SIBA's Independent Beer Awards.

== United States ==
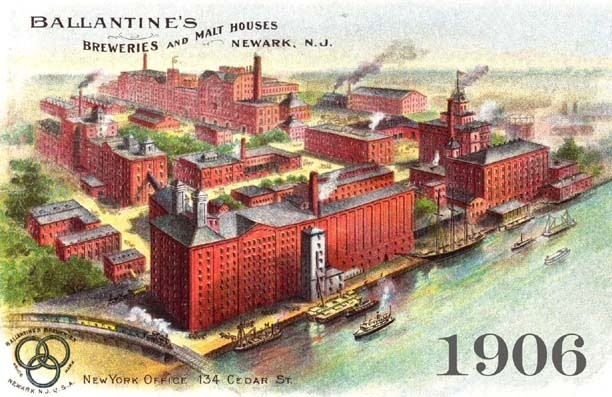
Ballantine's of New Jersey, brewers of Ballantine IPA

In the late 20th century craft beer revolution in the United States, brewers began seeking out old beer styles that had fallen out of vogue; Ballantine IPA, which had been made in the U.S. since 1890 until the 1990s, proved inspirational. The traditional IPA style was well-suited to model the intense flavour and aroma of American hops. Bert Grant of Yakima Brewing and Malting found that Cascade and Chinook hops, grown locally in Yakima, Washington, provided strong flavours when showcased in an IPA. The boom in popularity for IPA as a style spread down the west coast of the United States, then across the United States and eventually the world. It is estimated that over 40% of craft beer brewed in the United States can be classified as an IPA.

As the Oxford Companion to Beer notes: "IPA is now the signature of craft brewers worldwide. Fittingly for an export beer, brewers from Australia to Scandinavia are creating new beers, mostly inspired by the American take on the style, but often adding a regional twist of their own."

=== American varieties ===
==== American IPA (West Coast IPA or Classic IPA) ====
With the explosion of IPA subtypes, the traditional American IPA is often differentiated by calling it a West Coast IPA or Classic IPA. American IPAs are hop-forward in character, with classic examples from the West Coast of the United States in the 2000s (first decade of millennium) being especially bitter. They often have brilliant clarity and are dry with minimal malt character, although some slight haze caused by high hopping rates is common and acceptable. Being highly hopped, West Coast / American IPAs are typically very bitter, between 40 and 70 IBUs. As such, they commonly taste of resin as well as citrus and tropical fruit from the use of American "C" hops, although these are not the only hops that can be used. Often breweries around the world emulating the style will use local New-World hop varieties, or may use a combination of American and local hops.

==== Black IPA ====
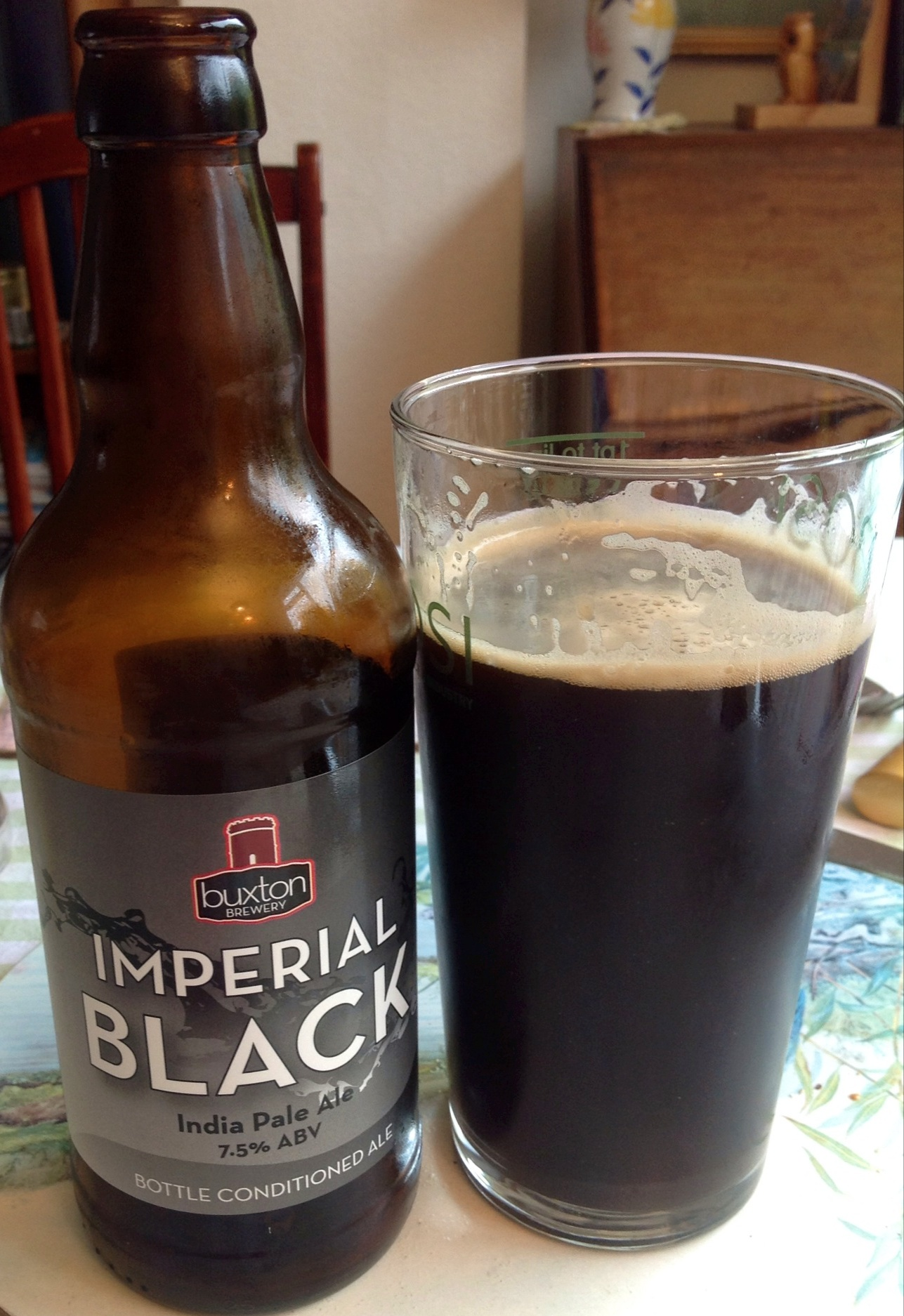
Imperial Black IPA from Buxton Brewery

Black IPA (also known as Cascadian Dark Ale (CDA) or American Black Ale) is not pale in color despite the "IPA" in the name implying it is a "pale ale". Black IPAs share the bitter hoppy flavors of other IPAs and have a strong malt backbone; however, they use dehusked roasted malts to give them a darker color, and somewhat of a coffee or roasted flavor. The origin of the style lies with Vermont Pub & Brewery in Burlington, Vermont. In 1989 or 1990, owner and head brewer Greg Noonan created a strong, roasty, "winter IPA" called Tartan IPA, inspired by a local, hoppy, dark red ale. A few years later, Noonan's protégé, Glenn Walter, embittered by a pending divorce, brewed an extremely bitter version of the beer, named Blackwatch IPA. Finally, in 1995, John Kimmich, Noonan's protégé, found the recipe card, and having recently learned of dehusked black malt, asked Noonan if he could rebrew the beer with a less roasty flavor, resulting in the first example of the Black IPA style. Black IPAs had not become popularized in the United States until 2009.

==== Brut IPA ====
A crisp, dry, fruity, and highly-carbonated IPA with very low body, the Brut IPA was invented by Kim Sturdavant, head brewer at San Francisco's Social Kitchen and Brewery. A Brut IPA is intended to be reminiscent of brut sparkling wines, with the nose and flavor of grapes or berries, and an effervescent level of carbonation. To make a brut IPA, brewers add the enzyme amyloglucosidase to break down malt sugars more than typical for ales, which will be fermented by yeast, leaving less residual sugar than a typical ale and resulting in the characteristic dry and thinly-bodied beer. The hops are usually selected to lend a white wine or fruity aroma and flavor, most notably the Nelson Sauvin and Hallertau Blanc hop varietals, which lend flavors characteristic of white wines.

==== Cold IPA ====
A Cold IPA is a hoppy beer style inspired by India pale ale. The substyle is typically made partially in the style of American macrolagers, such as Anheuser-Busch's Budweiser or Miller's High Life, with a malt bill that includes a substantial portion of maize, rice, or dextrose adjunct, and the use of lager yeast, and partially like an American IPA, with hops added to provide both substantial bitterness and hop flavors and aromas, and fermented at temperatures warmer than commonly used for lager fermentation (14-17°C).

==== Double IPA ====
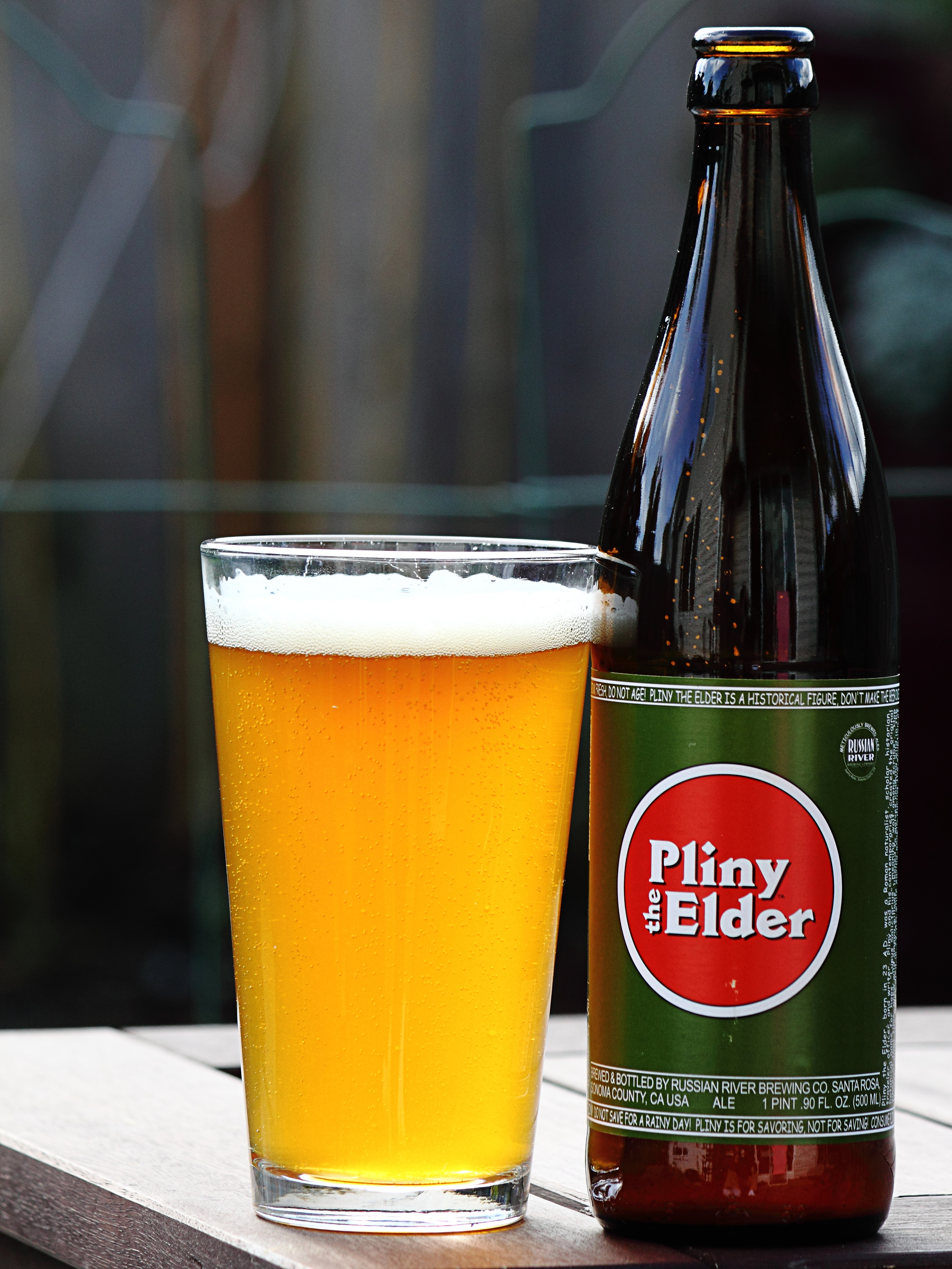
Pliny the Elder, a seminal example of the Double IPA style created by Vinnie Cilurzo

Double IPAs (also referred to as Imperial IPAs) are a stronger, very hoppy variant of IPAs that typically have alcohol content above 7.5% by volume. The term "double" refers to the increased amount of ingredients used, particularly hops, which results in a beer that is both higher in alcohol and richer in the hop character compared to a standard IPA. The style is claimed to have originated in 1994 with Inaugural Ale at the now-defunct Blind Pig Brewery in Temecula, California, which was brewed by Vinnie Cilurzo to celebrate the brewery's first anniversary. Cilurzo is credited as being the inventor of the style. Cilurzo, as founder and the head brewer of Russian River Brewing Company, created another Double IPA between 1999 and 2001, Pliny the Elder, which is considered a seminal example of the Double IPA style.

==== India Pale Lager ====
India pale lager (IPL) is not an IPA at all, in the sense of being an ale, but is nevertheless considered a substyle of IPA. IPL comprises a traditional American IPA wort, or pre-fermented beer, that is fermented with traditional lager yeast at colder, lager fermentation temperatures (10-13°C) rather than the warmer temperatures (17-20°C) at which IPAs are normally fermented. The use of traditional lager yeast can result in a beer that has a characteristic clean and crisp flavor typical of lager beers, as well as in some cases, slight sulfuric character, which is a common characteristic of some lager beers. IPL tend to be dry hopped after fermentation just like regular, American IPAs.

==== Midwest IPA ====
With the extreme dryness and bitterness of West Coast IPAs, some beer connoisseurs have observed that IPAs in some parts of the United States, especially in the Upper Midwest and Great Lakes states, have a maltier backbone and flavor profile that is more balanced between bitterness and hop presentation and malt character. These beers tend to be more amber or copper in color as well, due to the malt. These observers point to beers such as Bell's Brewery's Two Hearted Ale and Surly Brewing's Furious IPA as examples of this phenomenon. Others have observed that this is not a new phenomenon, and early American IPAs, such as Shipyard Brewing's Shipyard IPA, were maltier because they were modeled after English IPAs regardless of where in the USA they were made. Others have argued that Midwest IPA is not a substyle at all, and Midwest IPA is not a recognized substyle of IPA by either the Beer Judge Certification Program's in its 2021 Beer Style Guidelines or by the Brewers Association in its 2024 Beer Style Guidelines.

==== New England IPA ====
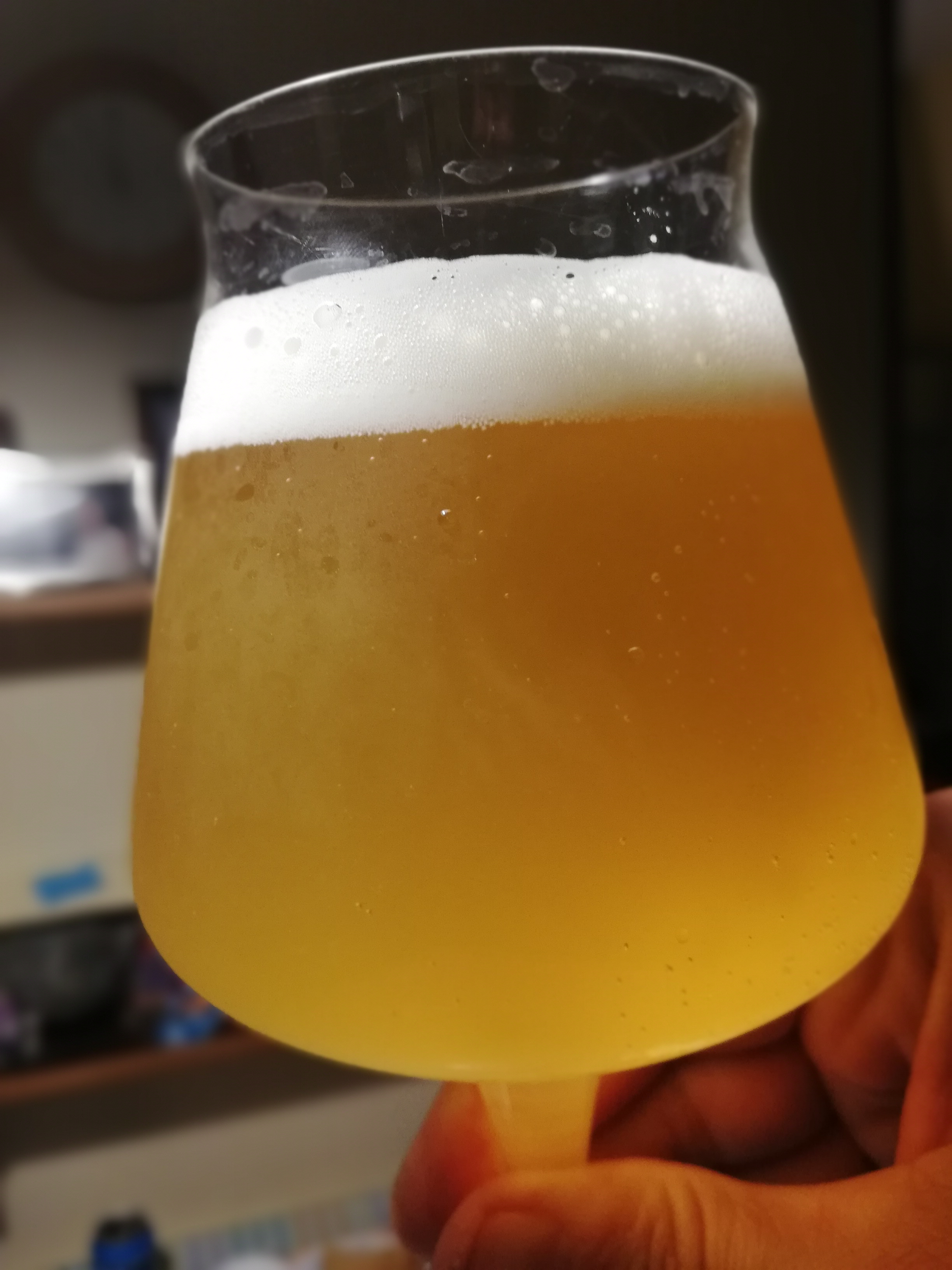
A New England IPA with typical hazy appearance

New England IPA (NEIPA, also referred to as Hazy IPA or Juicy IPA or, less frequently, Vermont IPA) is a type of Double IPA that was invented by John Kimmich in 2004 at the Alchemist Brewery in Waterbury, Vermont with the beer Heady Topper. Characterized by juicy citrus and floral flavors, with an emphasis on hop aroma with lower bitterness, they also have a smooth consistency or mouthfeel, and a hazy appearance. These characteristics are achieved using a combination of brewing techniques, including the use of particular strains of yeast, the use of oats or wheat in the malt bill to promote haze, the timing of adding the hops, and adjusting the chemistry of the brewing water. New England IPAs do not necessarily need to be brewed in New England. It was officially recognized as a separate beer style, the Juicy or Hazy India Pale Ale, by the Brewers Association in 2018. A variation on the style is the milkshake IPA, which adds lactose and occasionally fruit to make a New England IPA more creamy.

==== Triple IPA ====
Triple IPAs are characterized by higher hop flavors and higher alcohol content, with alcohol content usually over 10% ABV.

==== White IPA ====
White IPAs combine the flavors of an American IPA and a Belgian-style witbeer. One origin story suggests that the White IPA subtype was created in collaboration between Larry Sidor, the brewmaster at Oregon-based Deschutes Brewery, and Belgian-born Steven Pauwels, brewmaster at Boulevard Brewing in 2010. However, the substyle probably predated that collaboration brew, with Belgian-type IPAs with witbier-like qualities debuting before then, such as Brasserie Dunham's IPA Belge (2009), Brouwerij Van den Bossche's Buffalo Belgian Bitter (2009), and Flying Dog Brewery's Raging Bitch (2009), which was made by combining their house witbier yeast their citrus-forward Snake Dog IPA recipe. Furthermore, well prior to 2010, breweries were known to pour a concoction of draft beer comprising half IPA and half American wheat beer or Belgian witbier. One such example is at Odell Brewery in Colorado, where their Elephant IPA was blended with East Street Wheat (beer) and sold as "Easy Elephant".

== Gallery ==
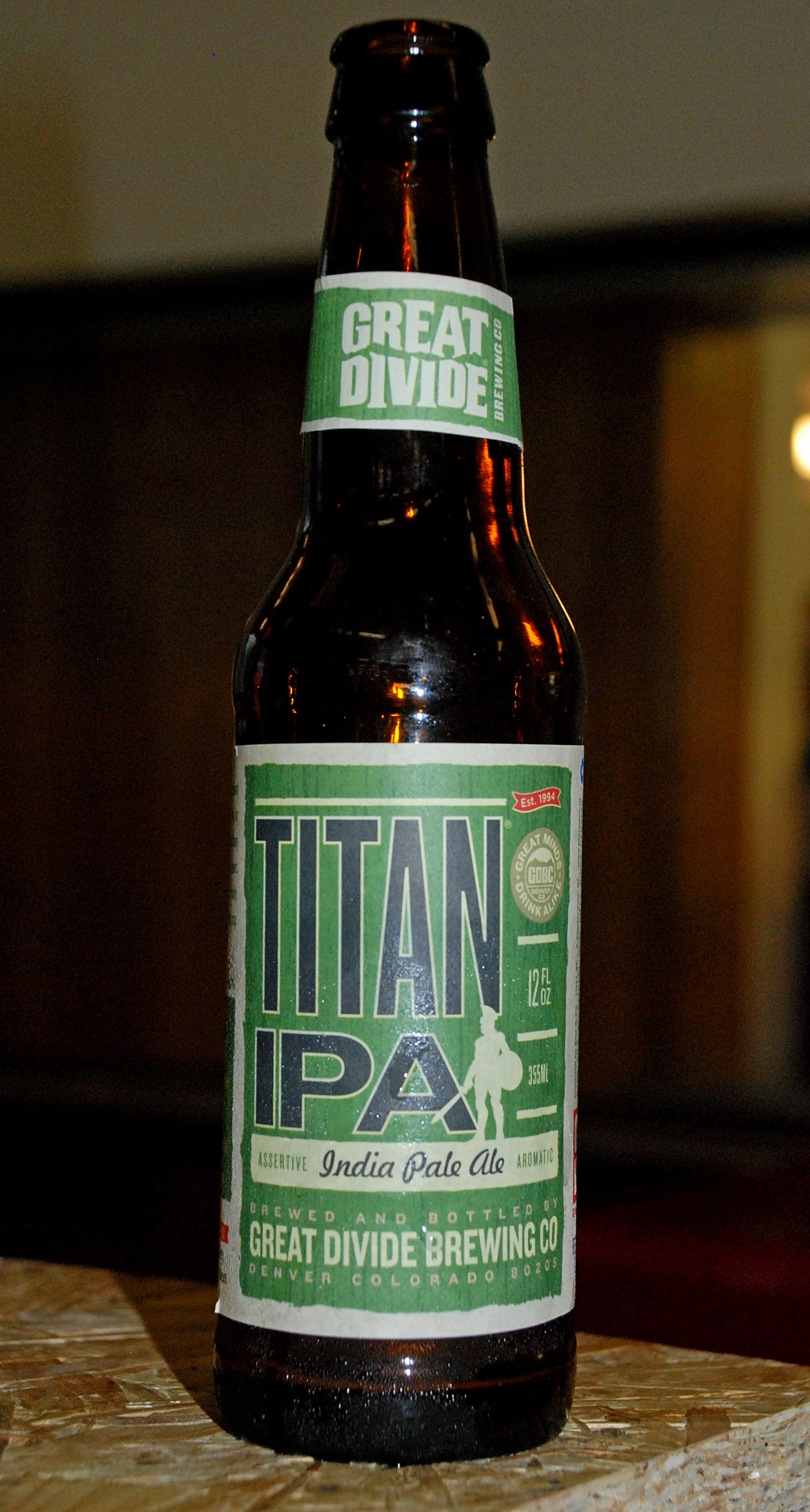
Great Divide
Titan IPA

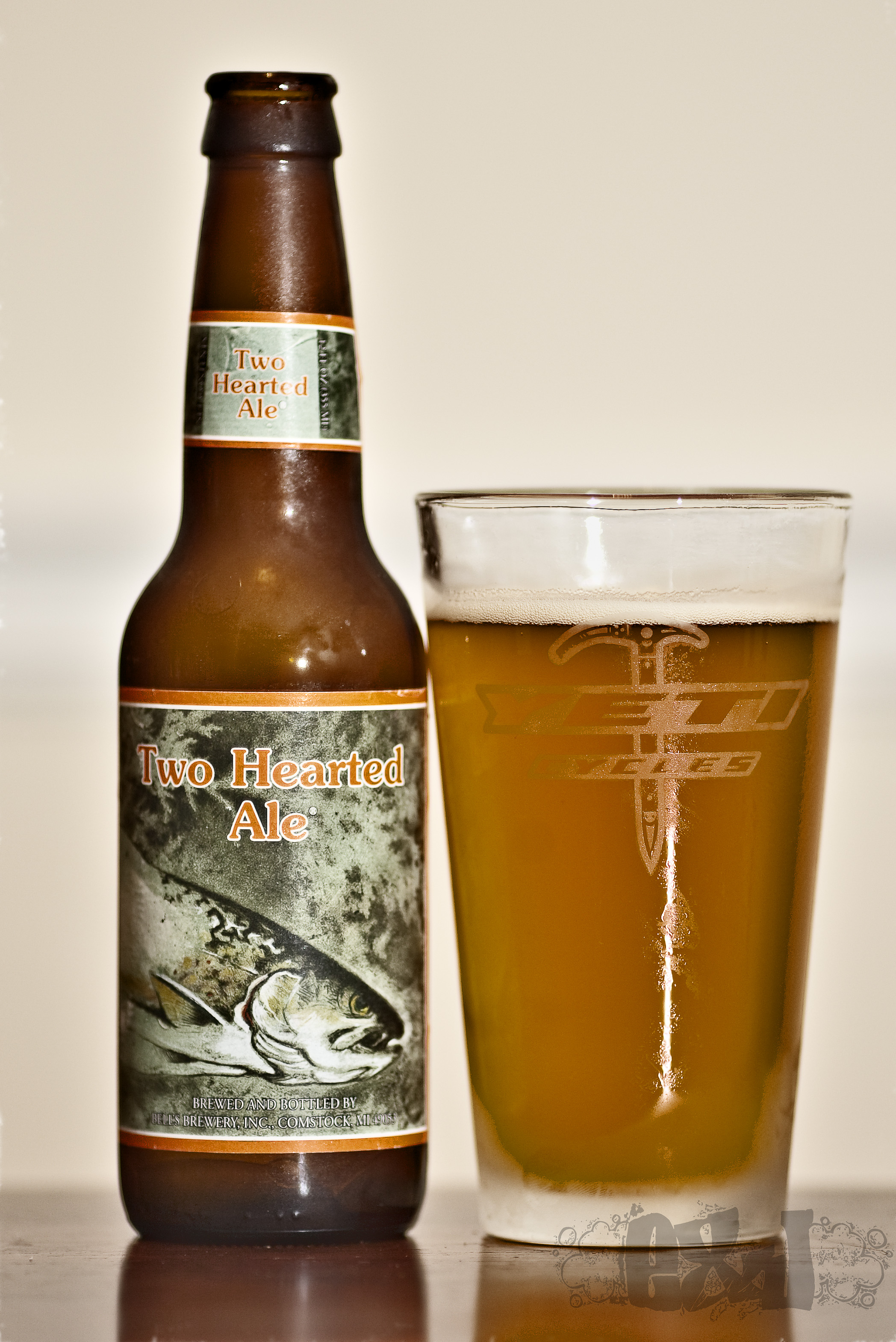
Bell's
Two Hearted Ale

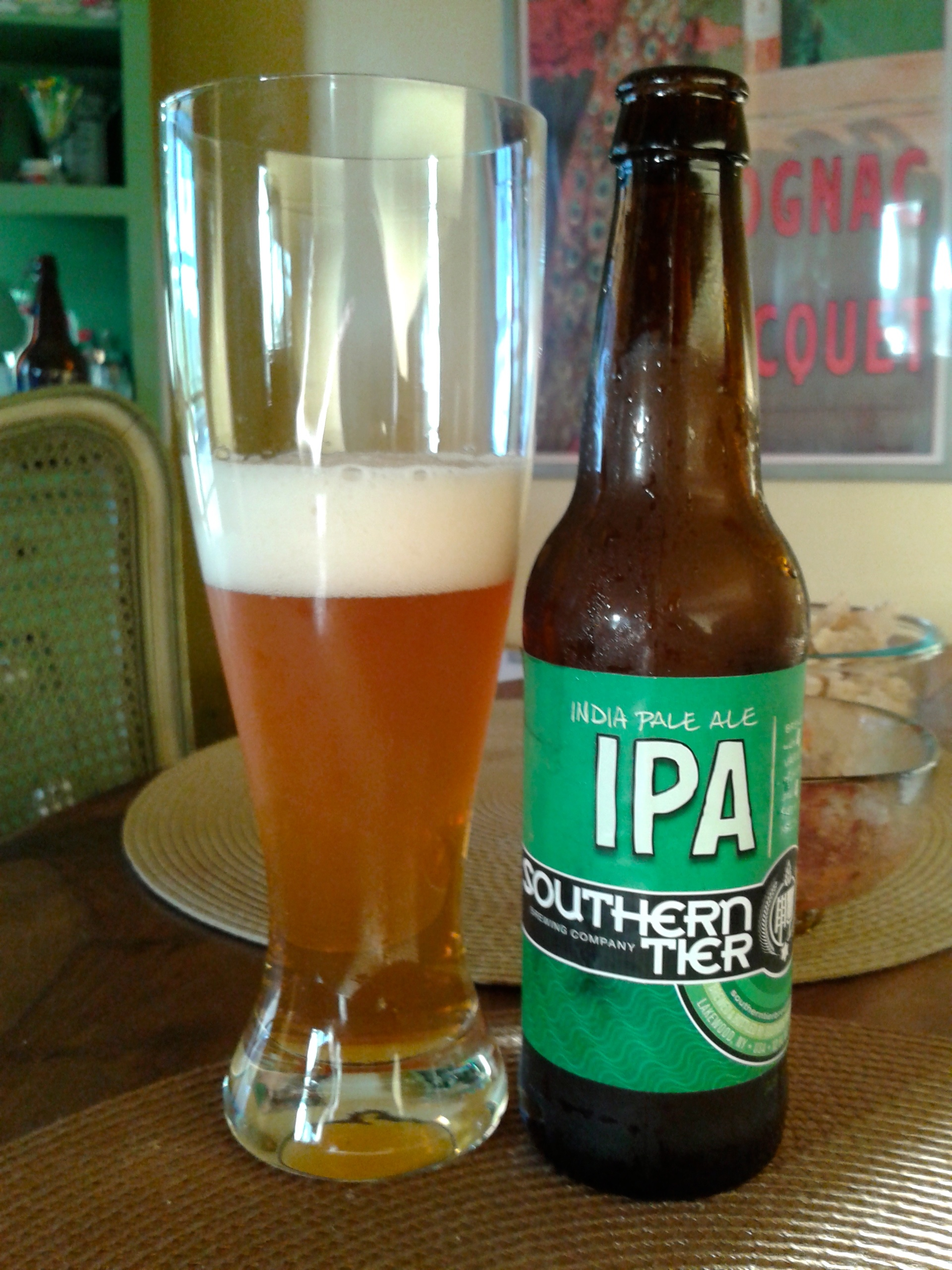
Southern Tier
IPA

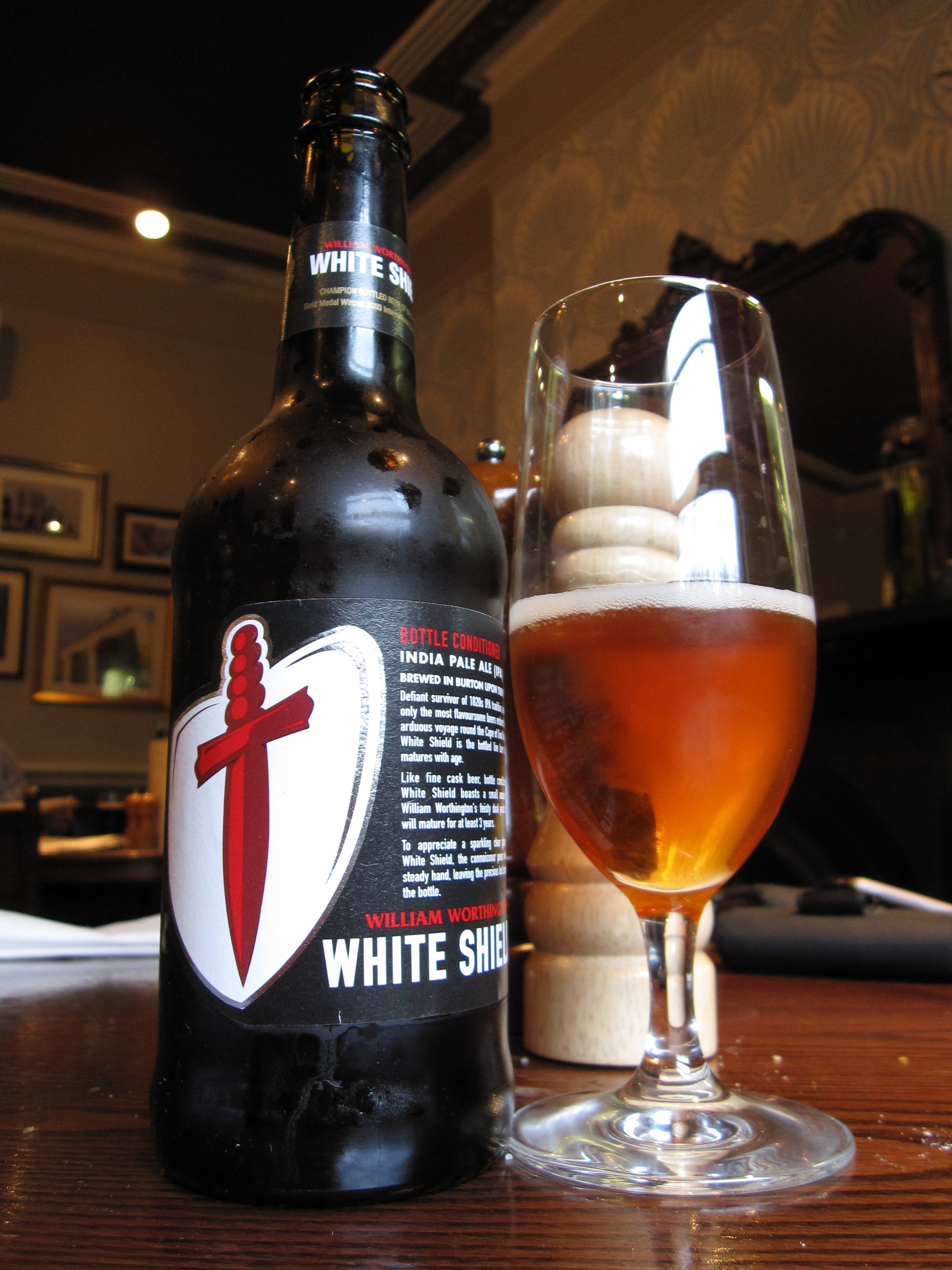
Worthington's
White Shield

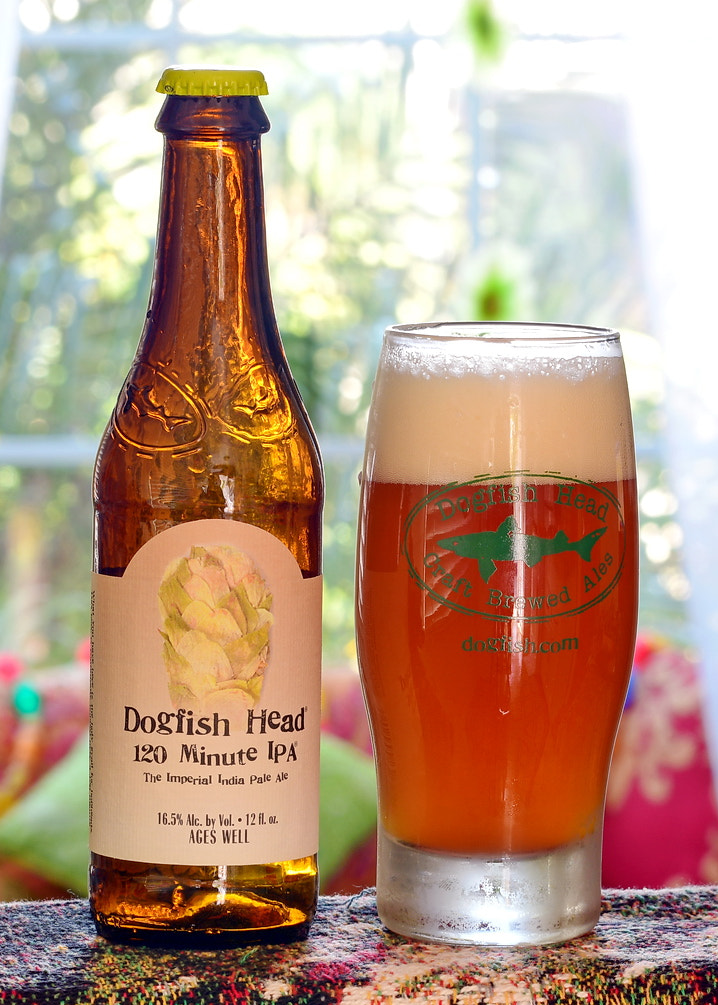
Dogfish Head
120 Minute IPA

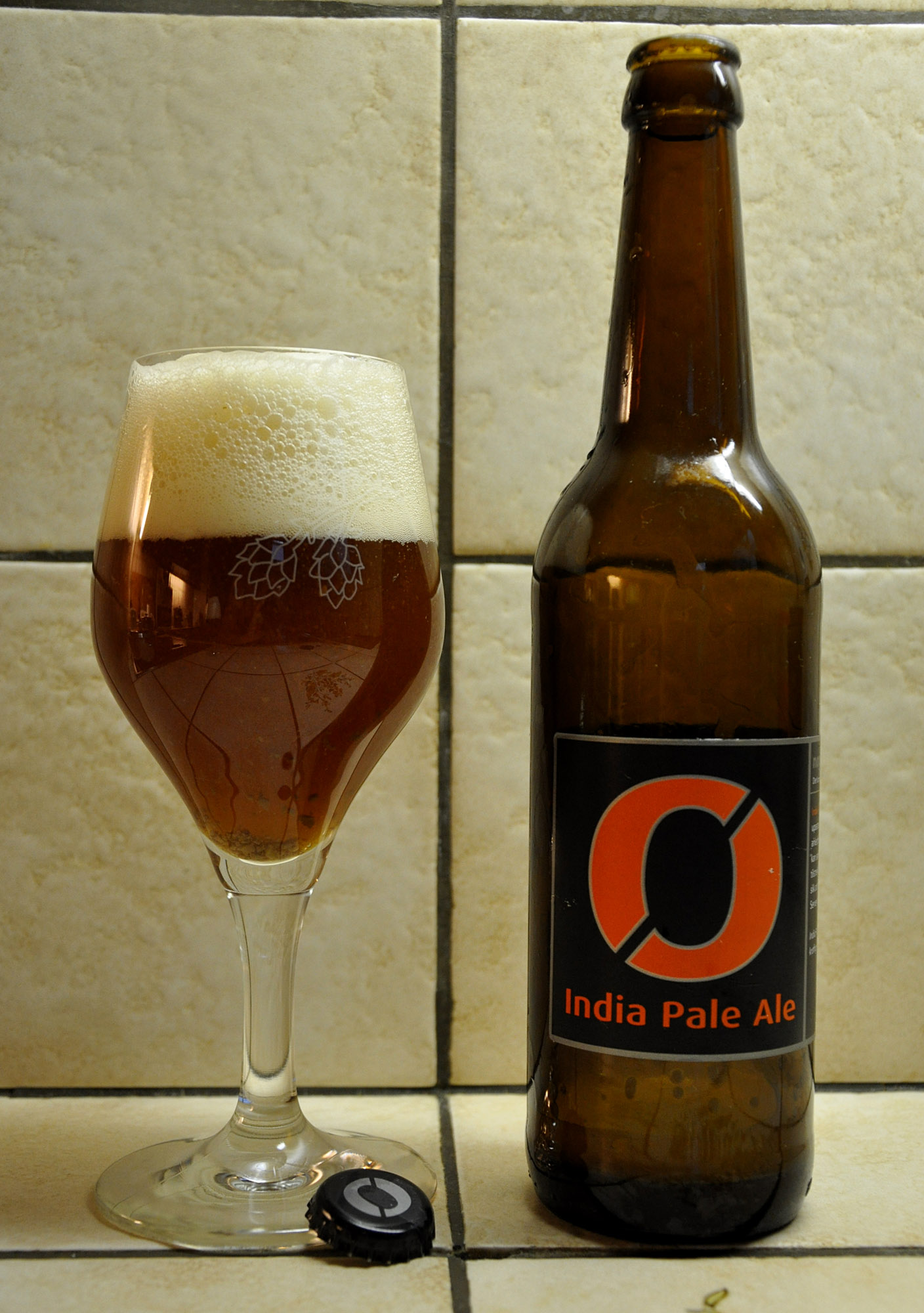
Nøgne Ø
India Pale Ale

== See also ==
- Craft brewery and microbrewery

== Bibliography ==
- Brown, Pete (2009), Hops & Glory: One Man's Search for the Beer That Built the British Empire, Pan Macmillan
- "Oregon Brewers Played an Outsized Role in Popularizing IPA". All Things Considered. NPR. 1 June 2024.
- Steele, Mitch (2012). IPA: Brewing Techniques, Recipes, and the Evolution of India Pale Ale. Brewers Publications. ISBN 978-1-938469-00-8.
