= Kernel =

Kernel may refer to:

== Computing ==
- Kernel (operating system), the central component of most operating systems
- Kernel (image processing), a matrix used for image convolution
- Compute kernel, in GPGPU programming
- Kernel method, in machine learning
- Kernelization, a technique for designing efficient algorithms
  - Kernel, a routine that is executed in a vectorized loop, for example in general-purpose computing on graphics processing units
- KERNAL, the Commodore operating system

== Mathematics ==
=== Objects ===
- Kernel (algebra), a general concept that includes:
  - Kernel (linear algebra) or null space, a set of vectors mapped to the zero vector
  - Kernel (category theory), a generalization of the kernel of a homomorphism
  - Kernel (set theory), an equivalence relation: partition by image under a function
  - Difference kernel, a binary equalizer: the kernel of the difference of two functions

=== Functions ===
- Kernel (geometry), the set of points within a polygon from which the whole polygon boundary is visible
- Kernel (statistics), a weighting function used in kernel density estimation to estimate the probability density function of a random variable
- Integral kernel or kernel function, a function of two variables that defines an integral transform
- Heat kernel, the fundamental solution to the heat equation on a specified domain
- Convolution kernel
- Stochastic kernel, the transition function of a stochastic process
- Transition kernel, a generalization of a stochastic kernel
- Pricing kernel, the stochastic discount factor used in mathematical finance
- Positive-definite kernel, a generalization of a positive-definite matrix
- Kernel trick, in statistics
- Reproducing kernel Hilbert space

== Science ==
- Seed, inside the nut of most plants or the fruitstone of drupes, especially:
  - Apricot kernel
  - Corn kernel
  - Palm kernel
  - Wheat kernel
- Atomic nucleus, the center of an atom

== Companies ==
- Kernel (agriculture company), a Ukrainian producer of sunflower oil
- Kernel (neurotechnology company), a developer of neural interfaces
- The Kernel Brewery, a craft brewery in London
- The Kernel, an Internet culture website, now part of The Daily Dot

== Other uses ==
- Kernel (EP), by the band Seam
- Kernel Fleck, a character in The Demonata series of books
- Brigitte Kernel (born 1959), French journalist and writer

== See also ==
- Colonel, a senior military officer rank that is pronounced "kernel"
