= Small Beer Brew Co. =

Brewery in London, England

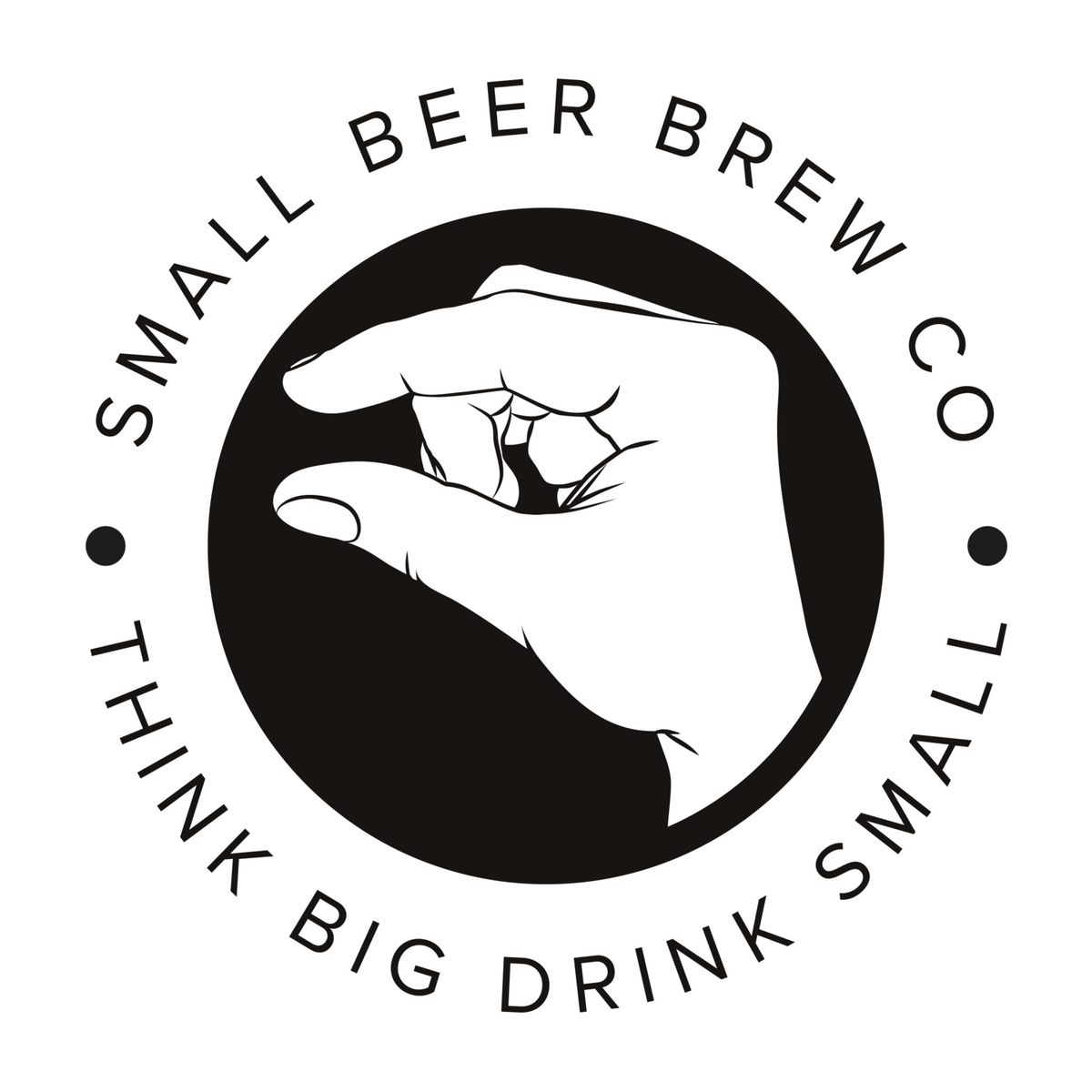
- Industry: Brewing
- Founded: 2017
- Headquarters: London, United Kingdom
- Products: Beer
- Website: theoriginalsmallbeer.com

The Small Beer Brew Co. (also known as Small Beer) is a London-based brewery that specialises in lower alcohol beers. It was established in 2017 by two ex-Sipsmith colleagues, James Grundy and Felix James. The company operates from a brewing facility in South Bermondsey, London, close to the 'Bermondsey Beer Mile,' a small London district containing many microbreweries.

Small Beer Brew Co. is dedicated to the production of small beer, which they themselves define as having an alcohol by volume (ABV) content that is between 0.5% and 2.8%.

== Products ==
Small Beer Brew Co. first produced a Pilsner style, combining Maris Otter malt with Saaz Hops, which is brewed at 2.1% ABV. The lager contains less than one unit of alcohol per 350 millilitre bottle. The company produces four other beers, all of which are lactose-free and suitable for people on a vegan diet.

== History ==
Small beer as a concept dates back to the 1700s when beers with a lower alcohol by volume content became a staple everyday refreshment because clean drinking water was so scarce. It typically refers to beers brewed between 1% and 2% ABV. However the EeBriaTrade organisation defines it as between 0.5% and 2.8%. All Small Beer Brew Co. "small beer" products contain more than 2% ABV.

Small Beer Brew Co. was launched in November 2017 by James Grundy and Felix James, who met while working together at Sipsmith gin company in London. The pair first brewed beer together in late 2016 and came up with plan to re-introduce the concept of small beer to a modern audience.

In October 2020, Small Beer Brew Co. launched a crowdfunding campaign on the Crowdcube platform. The company raised £750,000 from 555 investors, which resulted in a valuation of £9 million. Following another crowdfunding campaign, Small Beer Brew Co. raised almost £700,000 from over 580 investors, increasing the valuation of the company to £16 million.

== Sustainability ==
Small Beer Brew Co. achieved B Corp certification in November 2019 in recognition of its sustainable business practices.

The company enforces a "dry floor policy" at its brewery in Bermondsey, which has helped to reduce the amount of water required to produce a single pint of beer from the industry standard of 8-10 pints of water to 1.5 pints of water. The brewery is powered purely by wind, water and solar energy and the brewing kit has been designed to capture, recycle and recirculate water.
