= Blackhorse Beer Mile =

Group of breweries in east London

Coordinates: 51.5928°N 0.0419°W

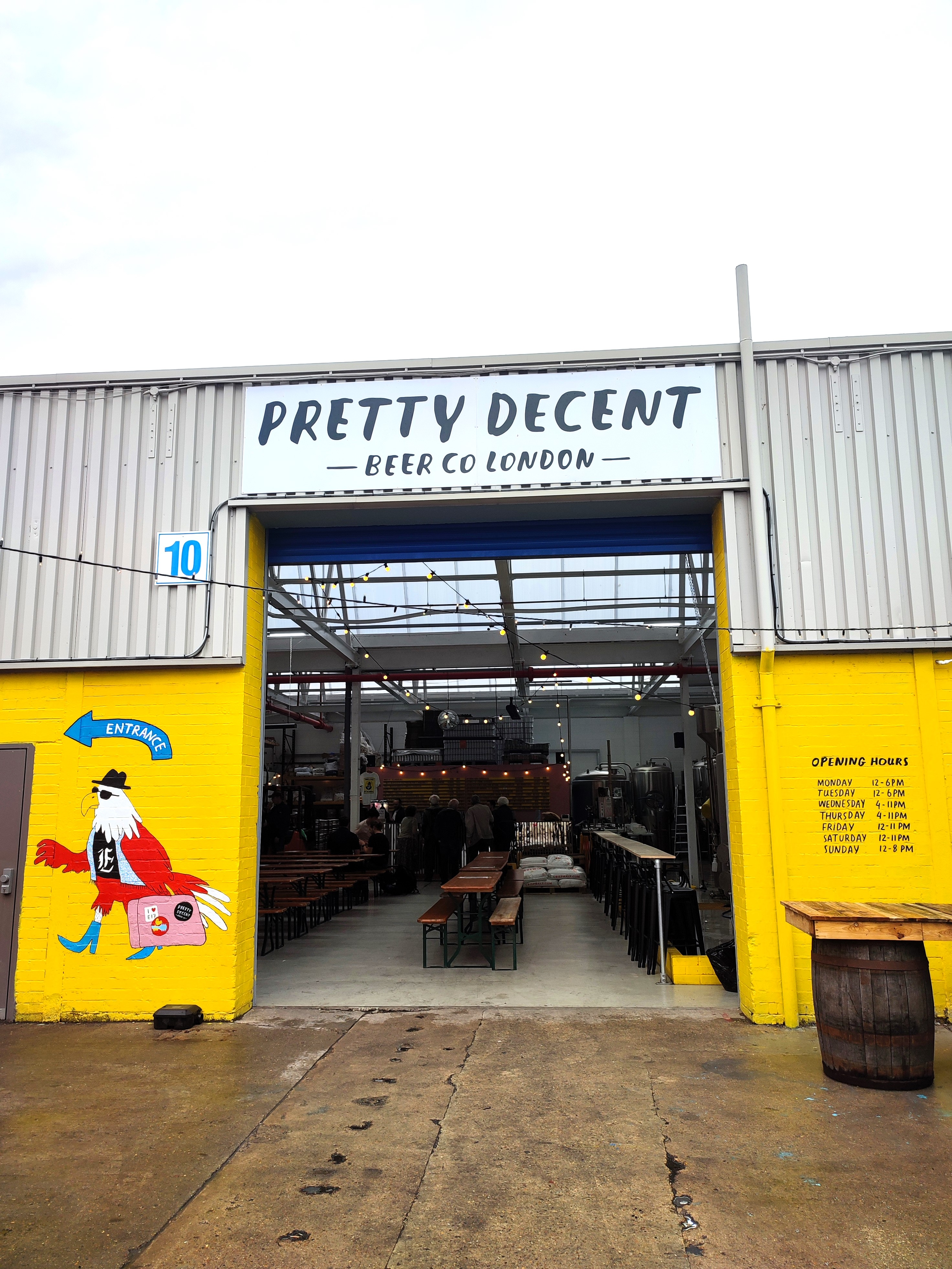
Pretty Decent Beer Co., one of the breweries on the Blackhorse Beer Mile

The Blackhorse Beer Mile is a grouping of breweries in Walthamstow, London, located on the former Uplands Business Park industrial estate to the east of the Walthamstow Reservoirs.

The "beer mile" is inspired by the similar Bermondsey Beer Mile in south London, and similarly hosts events and festivals. While several breweries had already been established in the area, the "beer mile" as an walkable route through the various breweries was launched in May 2022 by Signature Brew.

In March 2025, one of the breweries announced closure in an issue with the Walthamstow Council.

== See also ==
- Bermondsey Beer Mile
