= Stout =

Style of dark beer

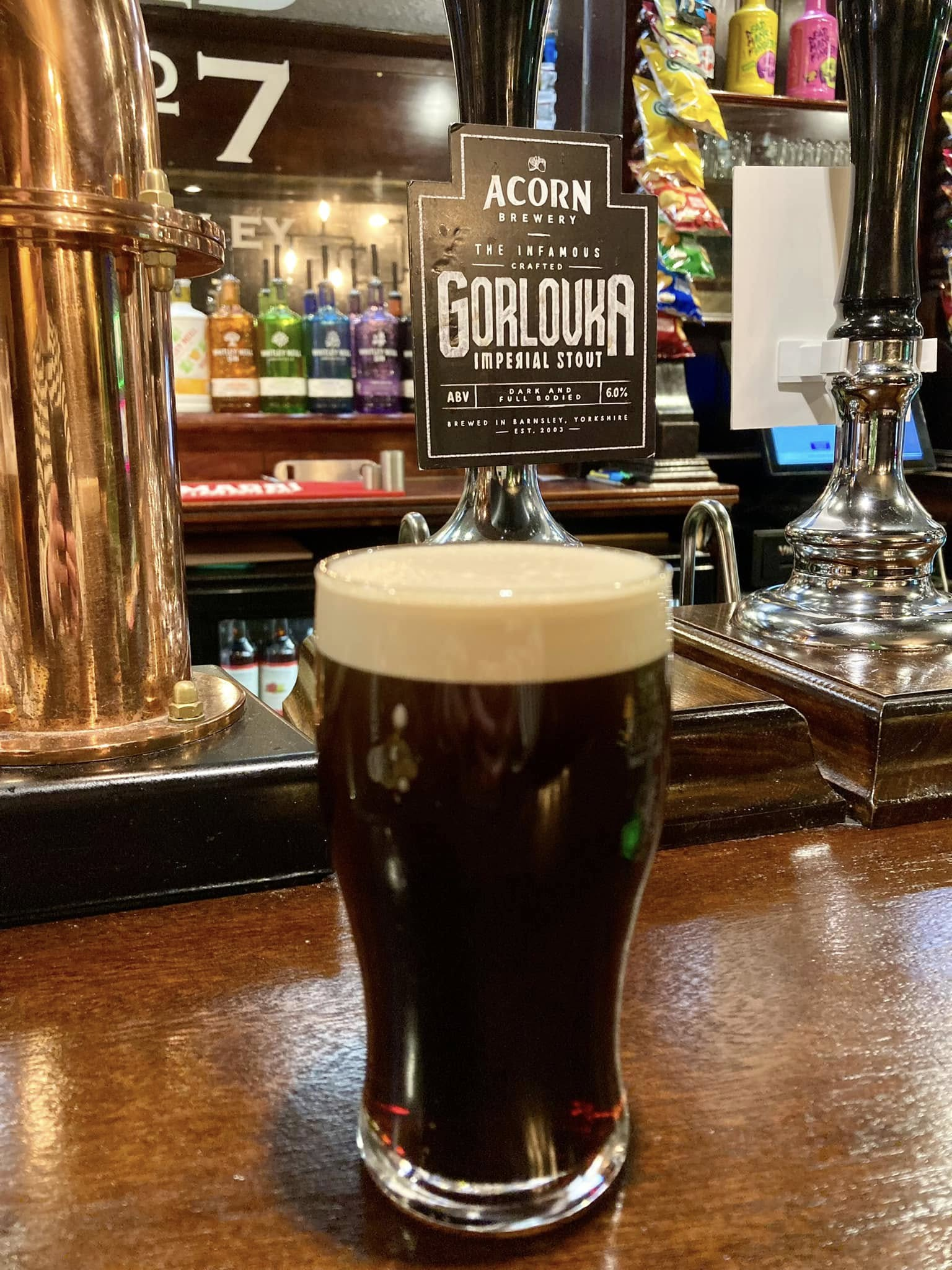
A pint of stout in England, the birthplace of the beer style

Stout is a type of dark beer that is generally warm fermented, such as dry stout, oatmeal stout, milk stout and imperial stout.

The first known use of the word "stout" for beer is in a document dated 1677 in the Egerton Manuscripts, referring to its strength. Porters were brewed to a variety of strengths, with the stronger beers called "stout porters". The history and development of stout and porter are thus intertwined.

== History ==
Porter originated in London, England in the early 1720s. The beer became popular in the city, especially with porters, (hence its name): it had a strong flavour, took longer to spoil than other beers, was significantly cheaper than other beers, and was not easily affected by heat. Within a few decades, porter breweries in London had grown "beyond any previously known scale". Large volumes were exported to Ireland and by 1776 it was being brewed by Arthur Guinness at his St. James's Gate Brewery. In the 19th century, the beer gained its customary black colour through the use of black patent malt, and became stronger in flavour.

Originally the adjective stout meant "proud" or "brave", but after the 14th century it took on the connotation of "strong". The first known use of the word stout for beer was in a document dated 1677 found in the Egerton Manuscript, the sense being that a stout beer was a strong beer. The expression stout porter was applied during the 18th century to strong versions of porter. Stout still meant only "strong" and it could be related to any kind of beer, as long as it was strong: in the UK it was possible to find "stout pale ale", for example. Later, stout was eventually to be associated only with porter, becoming a synonym of dark beer.

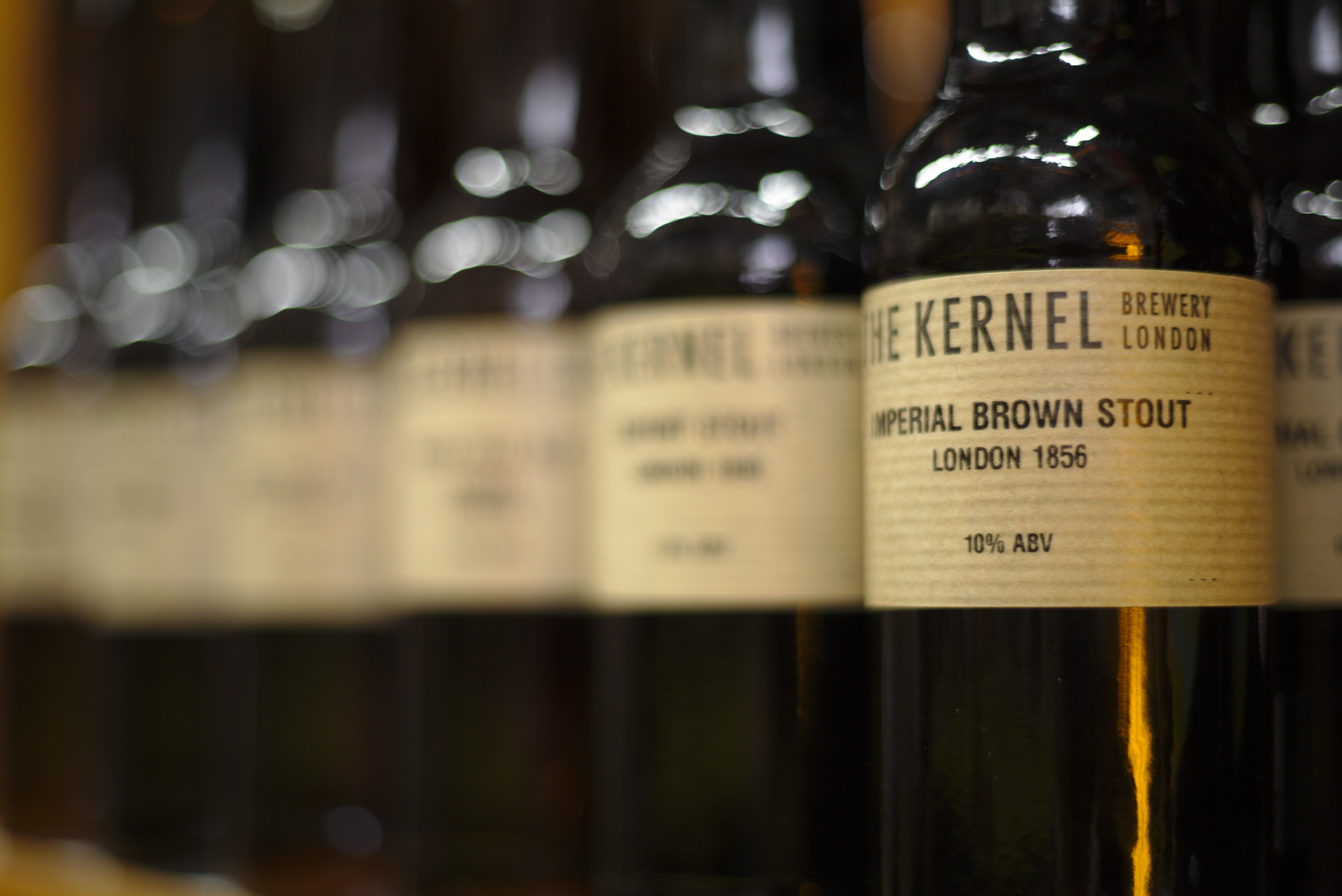
Imperial Brown Stout, a beer from The Kernel Brewery, London

Because of the huge popularity of porters, brewers made them in a variety of strengths. The beers with higher gravities were called "Stout Porters". There is still division and debate on whether stouts should be a separate style from porter. Usually the only deciding factor is strength.

"Nourishing" and sweet "milk" stouts became popular in Great Britain in the years following the First World War, though their popularity declined towards the end of the 20th century, apart from pockets of local interest such as in Glasgow with Sweetheart Stout.

Beer writer Michael Jackson wrote about stouts and porters in the 1970s, but in the mid 1980s a survey by What's Brewing found just 29 brewers in the UK and Channel Islands still making stout, most of them milk stouts. In the 21st century, stout is making a comeback with a new generation of drinkers, thanks to new products from burgeoning craft and regional brewers.

== Milk stout ==
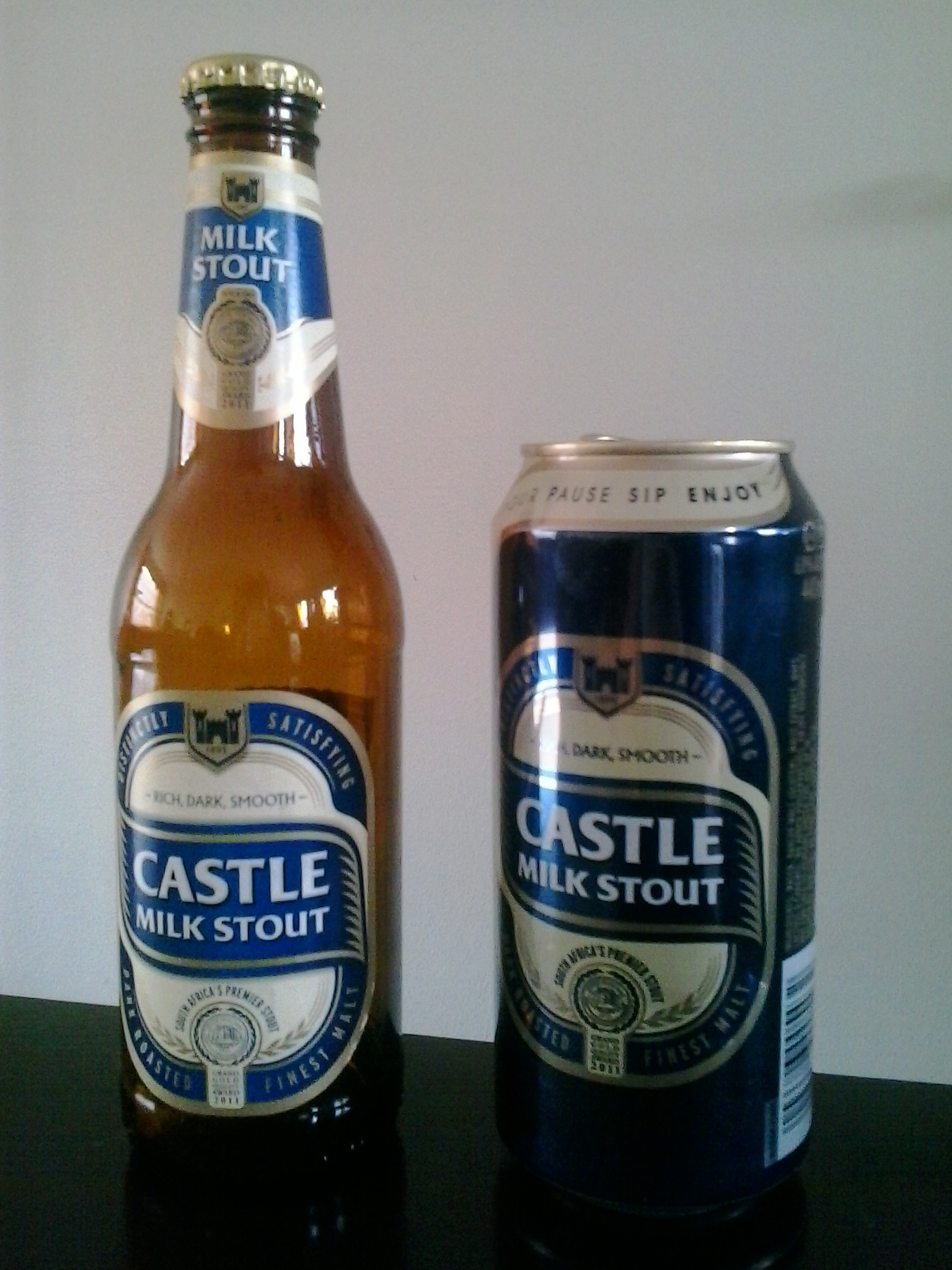
Castle Milk Stout from South African Breweries

Milk stout (also called sweet stout or cream stout) is a stout containing lactose, a sugar derived from milk. Because lactose cannot be fermented by beer yeast, it adds sweetness and perceived body to the finished beer.

Milk stout has historically been claimed to be nutritious, advertised to nursing mothers as helping to increase their milk production. An archetypical surviving example of milk stout is Mackeson's, for which the original brewers advertised that "each pint contains the energising carbohydrates of 10 ounces [1/2 pint, 284 ml] of pure dairy milk." The style was rare until being revived by a number of craft breweries in the twenty-first century.

Well known examples include the Bristol Beer Factory Milk Stout, the Left Hand Milk Stout and the Lancaster Milk Stout.

There were prosecutions in Newcastle upon Tyne in 1944 under the Food and Drugs Act 1938 regarding misleading labelling of milk stout.

== Irish stout ==
With sweet stouts becoming the dominant stout in the UK in the early 20th century, it was mainly in Ireland that the non-sweet or standard stout was being made. As standard stout has a drier taste than the English and American sweet stouts, they came to be called dry stout or Irish stout to differentiate them from stouts with added lactose or oatmeal. This is the style that represents a typical stout to most people. The best selling stouts worldwide are Irish stouts made by Guinness (now owned by Diageo) at St. James's Gate Brewery (also known as the Guinness Brewery) in Dublin. Guinness makes a number of different varieties of its Irish stouts. Other examples of Irish dry stout include Murphy's and Beamish, now both owned by Heineken.

Draught Irish stout is normally served with a nitrogen propellant in addition to the carbon dioxide most beers use, to create a creamy texture with a long-lasting head. Some canned and bottled stouts include a special device called a "widget" to nitrogenate the beer in the container to replicate the experience of the keg varieties.

== Porter ==
There were no differences between stout and porter historically, though there had been a tendency for breweries to differentiate the strengths of their beers with the words "extra", "double" and "stout". The term stout was initially used to indicate a stronger porter than other porters from a brewery.

== Oatmeal stout ==
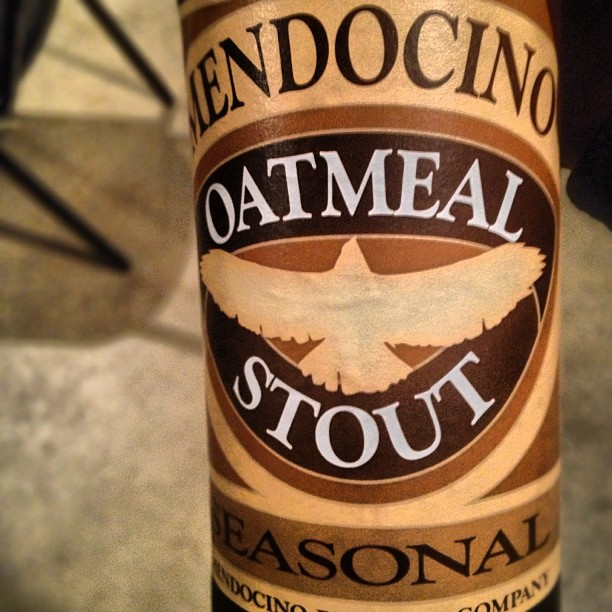
An oatmeal stout from Mendocino Brewing Company, a craft brewery founded in 1983

Oatmeal stout is a stout with a proportion of oats, normally a maximum of 30%, added during the brewing process.

Even though a larger proportion of oats in beer can lead to a bitter or astringent taste, during the medieval period in Europe, oats were a common ingredient in ale, and proportions up to 35% were standard. In 17th-century England, mixed oat and barley malt was referred to as 'dredge'. Despite some areas of Europe, such as Norway, still clinging to the use of oats in brewing until the early part of the 20th century, the practice had largely died out by the 16th century, so much so that in 1513 Tudor sailors refused to drink oat beer offered to them because of the bitter flavour.

There was a revival of interest in using oats during the end of the 19th century, when (supposedly) restorative, nourishing and invalid beers, such as the later milk stout, were popular, because of the association of porridge with health. Maclay of Alloa produced an Original Oatmalt Stout in 1895 that used 70% "oatmalt", and a 63/- Oatmeal Stout in 1909, which used 30% "flaked (porridge) oats".

In the 20th century, many oatmeal stouts contained only a minimal amount of oats. For example, in 1936 Barclay Perkins Oatmeal Stout used only 0.5% oats. As the oatmeal stout was brewed in a parti-gyle process with their porter and standard stout, these two also contained the same proportion of oats. (Parti-gyle brewing involves extracting multiple worts from a single mash through separate sparges. Each subsequent sparge extracts a more diluted lower gravity wort from the same ingredients in proportion. As a result each wort is boiled and fermented to produces a different strength beer from same ingredients) The name seems to have been a marketing device more than anything else. In the 1920s and 1930s Whitbread's London Stout and Oatmeal Stout were identical, just packaged differently. The amount of oats Whitbread used was minimal, again around 0.5%. With such a small quantity of oats used, it could only have had little impact on the flavour or texture of these beers.

Many breweries were still brewing oatmeal stouts in the 1950s, for example Brickwoods in Portsmouth, Matthew Brown in Blackburn and Ushers in Trowbridge. When Michael Jackson mentioned the defunct Eldrige Pope "Oat Malt Stout" in his 1977 book The World Guide to Beer, oatmeal stout was no longer being made anywhere, but Charles Finkel, founder of Merchant du Vin, was curious enough to commission Samuel Smith to produce a version. Samuel Smith's Oatmeal Stout then became the template for other breweries' versions.

Oatmeal stouts do not usually taste specifically of oats. The smoothness of oatmeal stouts comes from the high content of proteins, lipids (includes fats and waxes), and gums imparted by the use of oats. The gums increase the viscosity and body adding to the sense of smoothness.

== Oyster stout ==
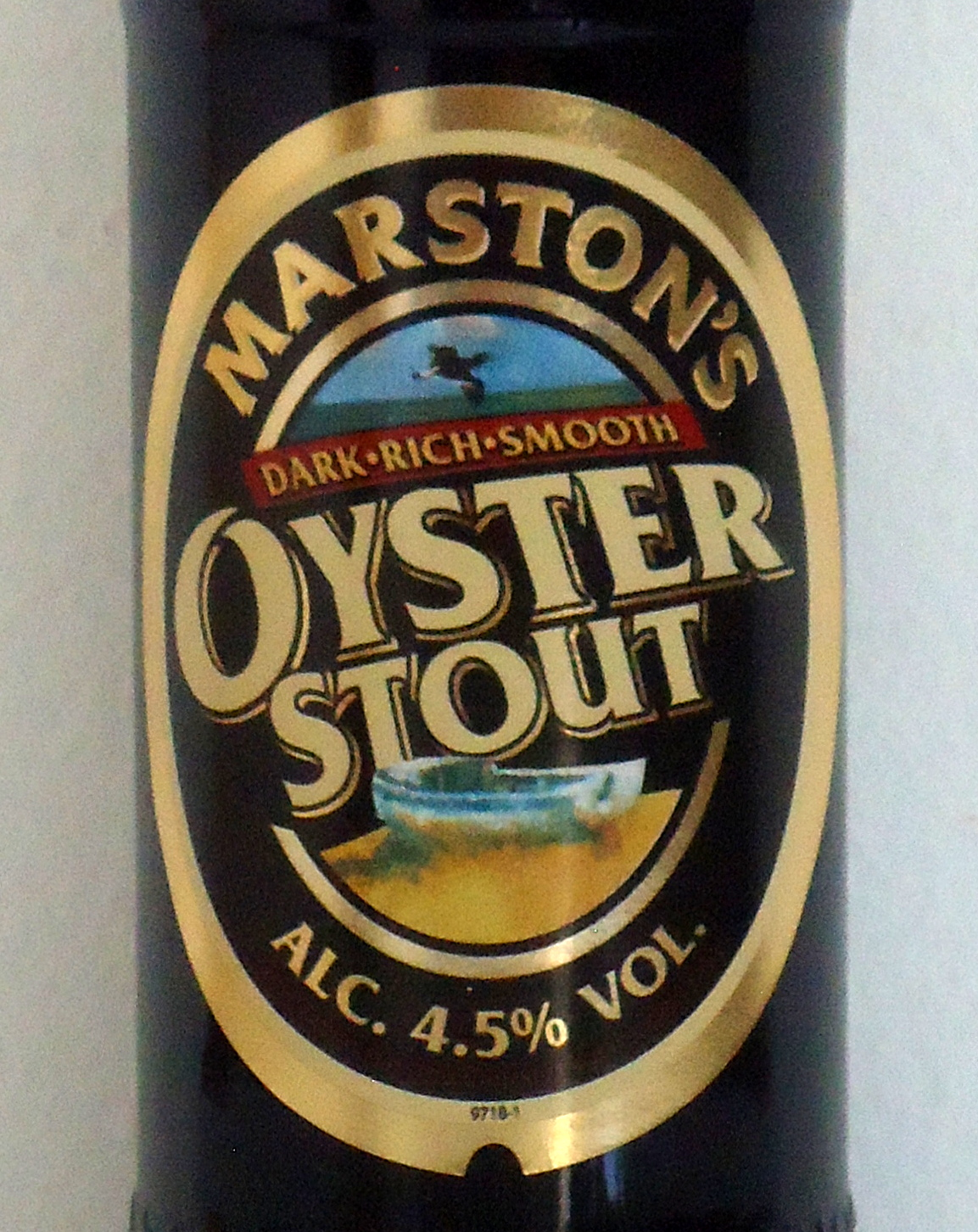
Marston's Oyster Stout

Oysters have had a long association with stout. When stouts were emerging in the 18th century, oysters were a commonplace food often served in public houses and taverns. By the 20th century, oyster beds were in decline, and stout had given way to pale ale. Ernest Barnes came up with the idea of combining oysters with stout using an oyster concentrate made by Thyrodone Development Ltd. in Bluff, New Zealand, where he was factory manager. It was first sold by the Dunedin Brewery Company in New Zealand in 1938, with the Hammerton Brewery in London, UK, beginning production using the same formula the following year. Hammerton Brewery was re-established in 2014 and is once again brewing an oyster stout.

Modern oyster stouts may be made with a handful of oysters in the barrel, hence the warning by one establishment, the Porterhouse Brewery in Dublin, that their award-winning Oyster Stout was not suitable for vegetarians. Others, such as Marston's Oyster Stout, use the name with the implication that the beer would be suitable for drinking with oysters.

== Chocolate stout ==
Chocolate stout is a name brewers sometimes give to certain stouts having a noticeable dark chocolate flavour through the use of darker, more aromatic malt; particularly chocolate malt—a malt that has been roasted or kilned until it acquires a chocolate colour. Sometimes, as with Muskoka Brewery's Double Chocolate Cranberry Stout, Young's Double Chocolate Stout, and Rogue Brewery's Chocolate Stout, the beers are also brewed with a small amount of chocolate, chocolate flavouring, or cacao nibs.

== Imperial stout ==
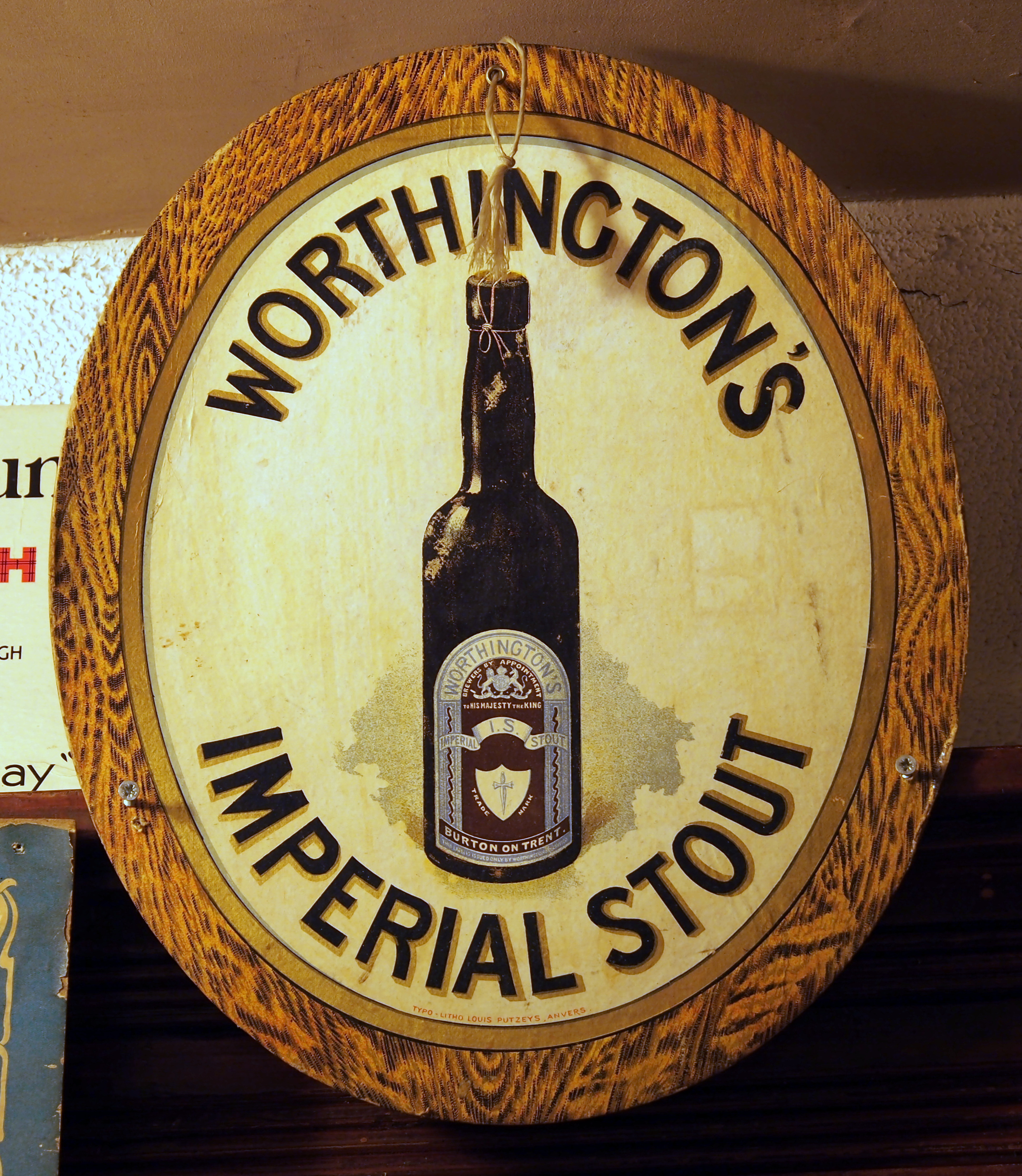
Worthington's Imperial Stout advertisement

Imperial stout, also known as Russian imperial stout, is a strong stout. The style originated in 18th-century London, created by Thrale's Anchor Brewery for export to the court of Catherine II of Russia. In 1781 the brewery changed hands and the beer became known as "Barclay Perkins Imperial Brown Stout". It was shipped to Russia by Albert von Le Coq who was awarded a Russian royal warrant which entitled him to use the name "Imperial". Historical analyses from the time period of 1849 to 1986 show that the beer had an original gravity between 1.100 and 1.107 and an alcohol content of around 10% ABV. This remained virtually unchanged over the whole time period. A recipe from 1856 also indicates that it was hopped at a rate of 10 pounds of hops to the barrel (28 g/L). When Barclay's brewery was taken over by Courage in 1955, the beer was renamed "Courage Imperial Russian Stout" and it was brewed sporadically until 1993. The bottle cap still said "Barclay's".

In Canada, Imperial Stout was produced in Prince Albert first by Fritz Sick, and then by Molson following a 1958 takeover. Denmark's Wiibroe Brewery launched its 8.2 per cent Imperial Stout in 1930. The first brewery to brew an Imperial Stout in the United States was Bert Grant's Yakima Brewing.

Imperial stouts have a high alcohol content, usually over 9% abv, and are among the darkest available beer styles. Samuel Smith's brewed a version for export to the United States in the early 1980s, and today Imperial stout is among the most popular beer styles with U.S. craft brewers. American interpretations of the style often include ingredients such as vanilla beans, chili powder, maple syrup, coffee, and marshmallows. Many are aged in bourbon barrels to add additional layers of flavour. The word "Imperial" is now commonly added to other beer styles to denote a stronger version, hence Imperial IPAs, Imperial pilsners etc.

A similar beer style, Baltic porter, originated in the Baltic region in the 19th century. Imperial stouts imported from Britain were recreated locally using local ingredients and brewing traditions.

=== Gallery of imperial stouts ===
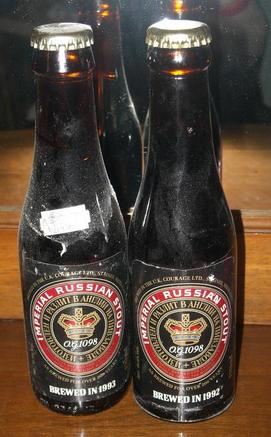
Courage Imperial Russian Stout

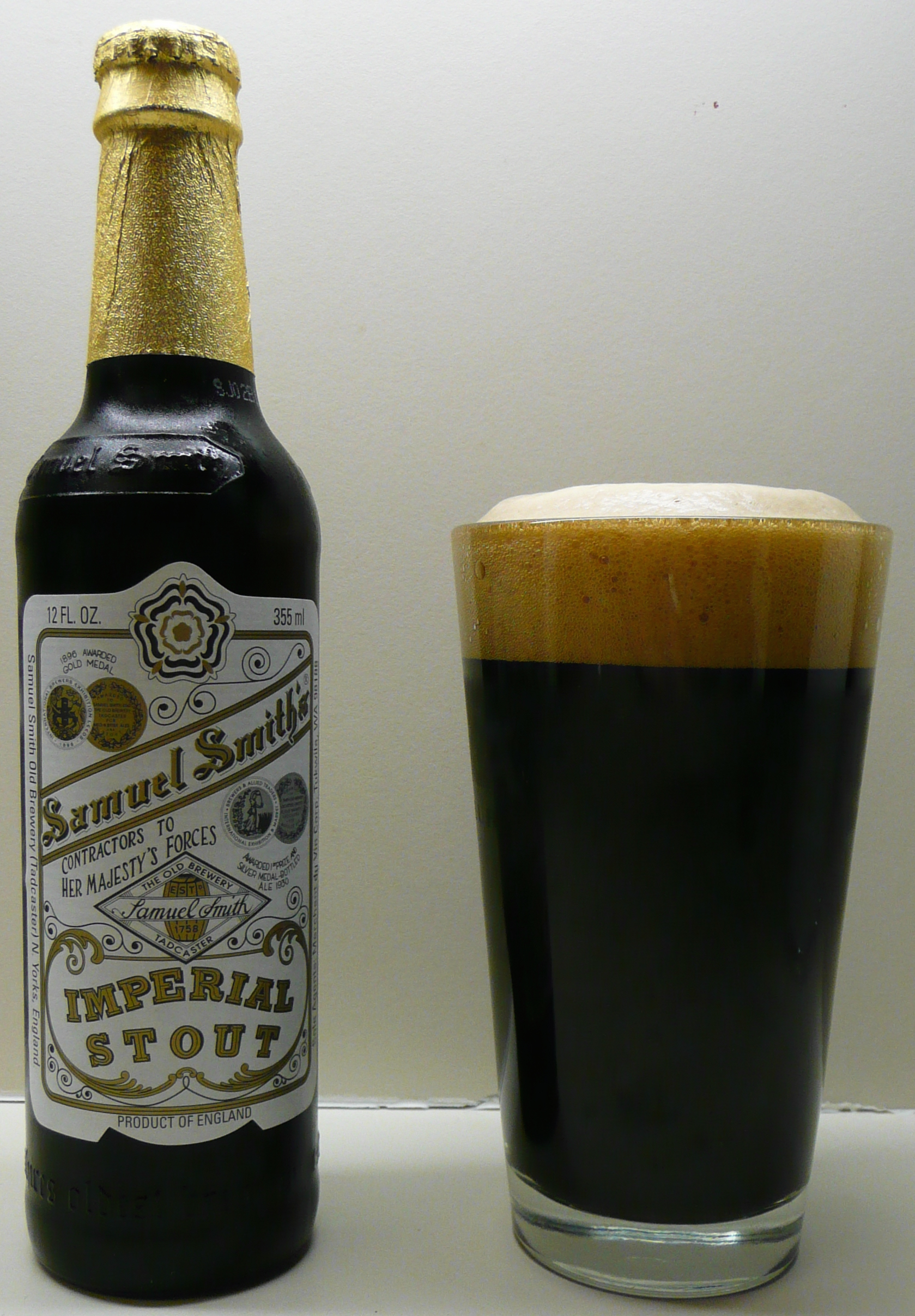
Samuel Smith's
Imperial Stout

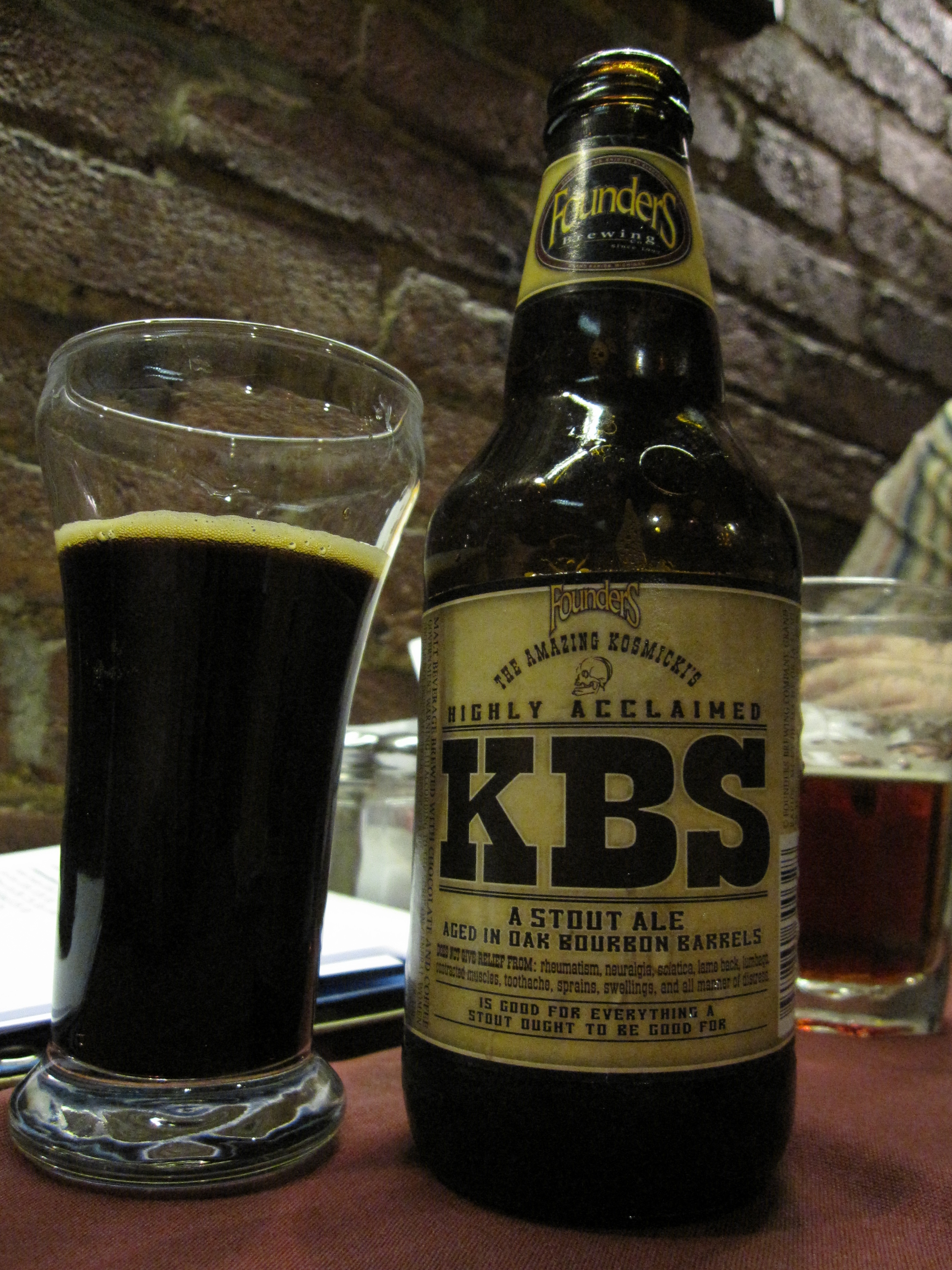
Founders Kentucky Breakfast Stout

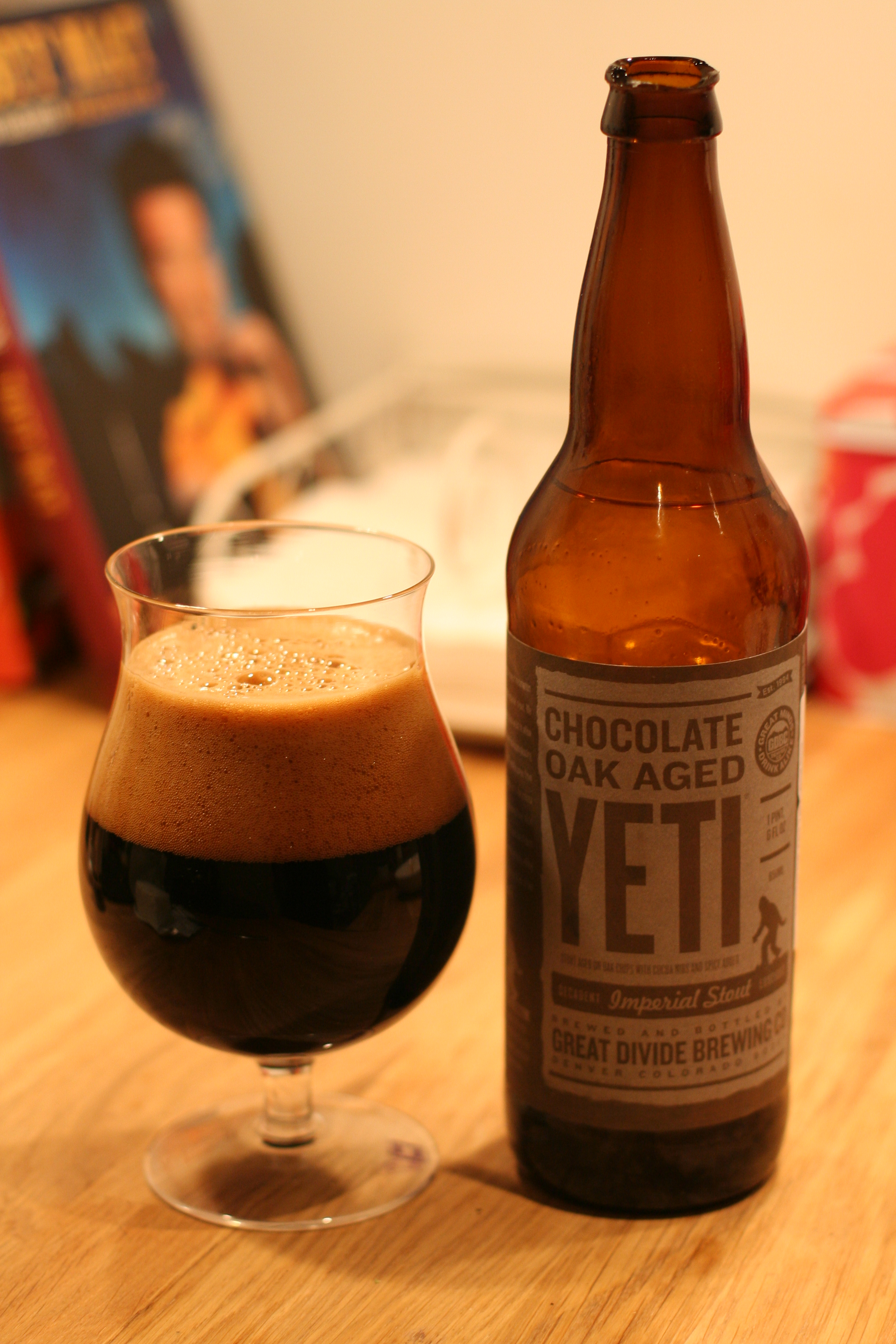
Great Divide
Oak Aged Yeti

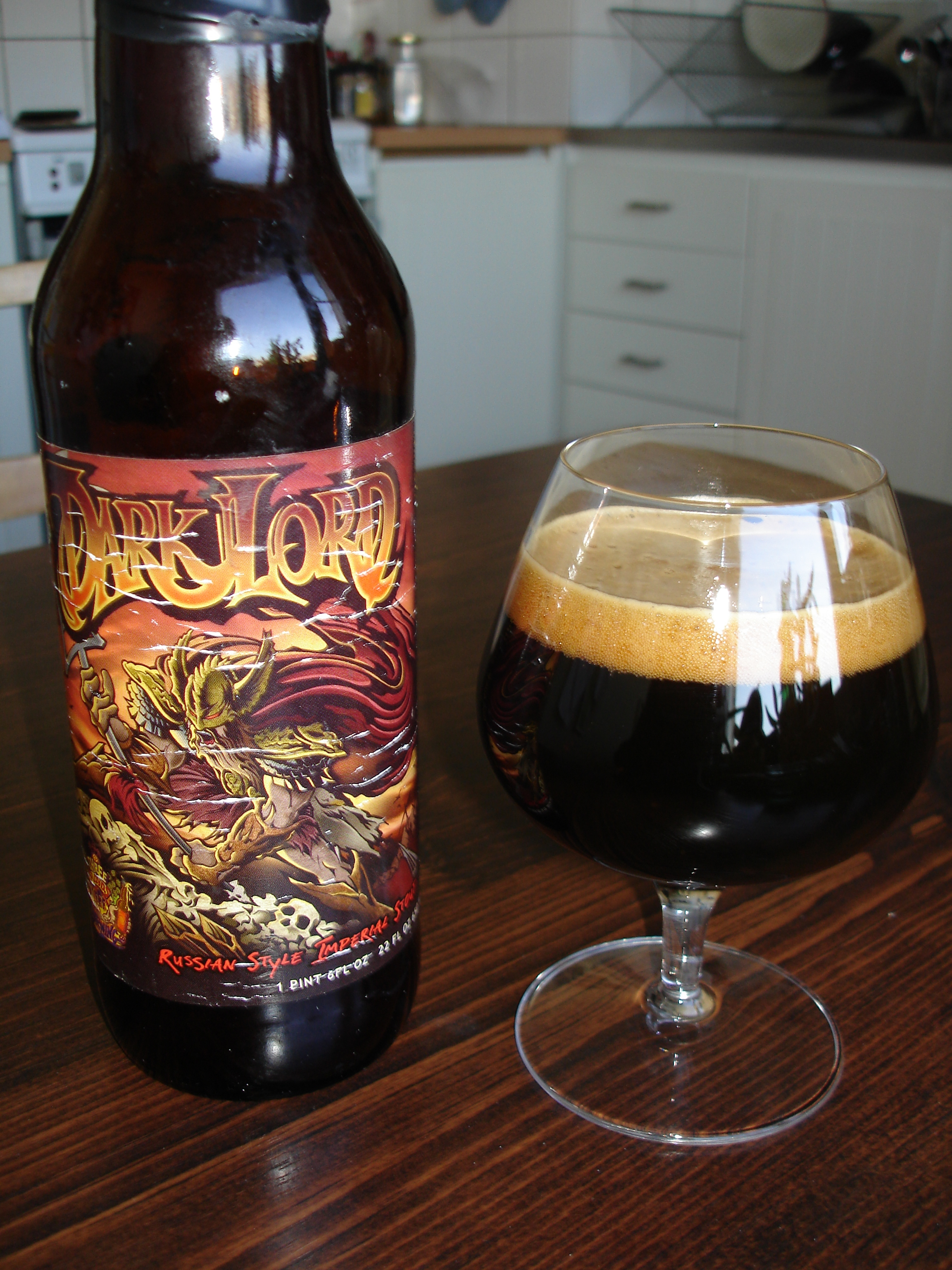
Three Floyds
Dark Lord

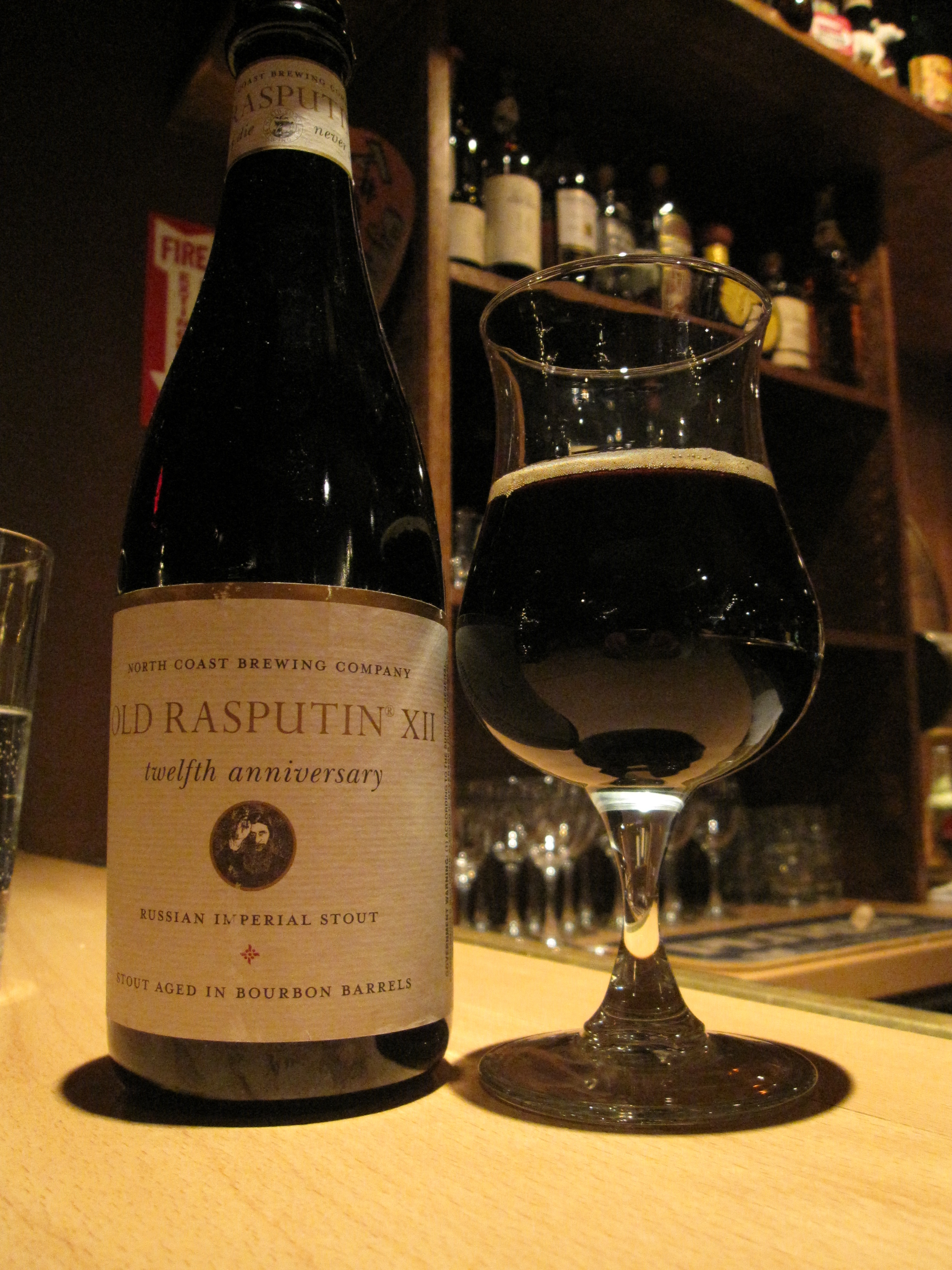
North Coast
Old Rasputin XII

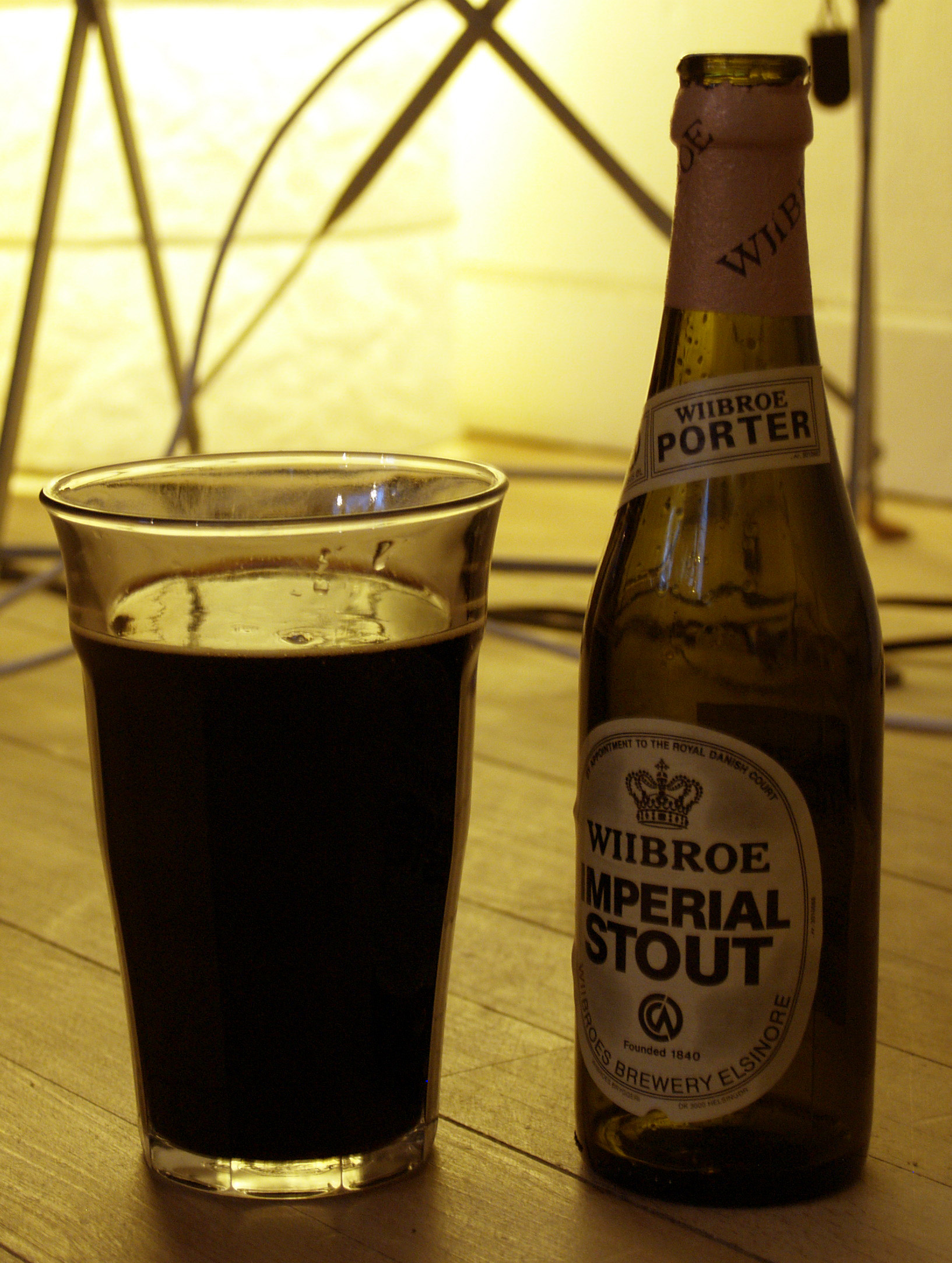
Carlsberg
Wiibroe Imperial Stout

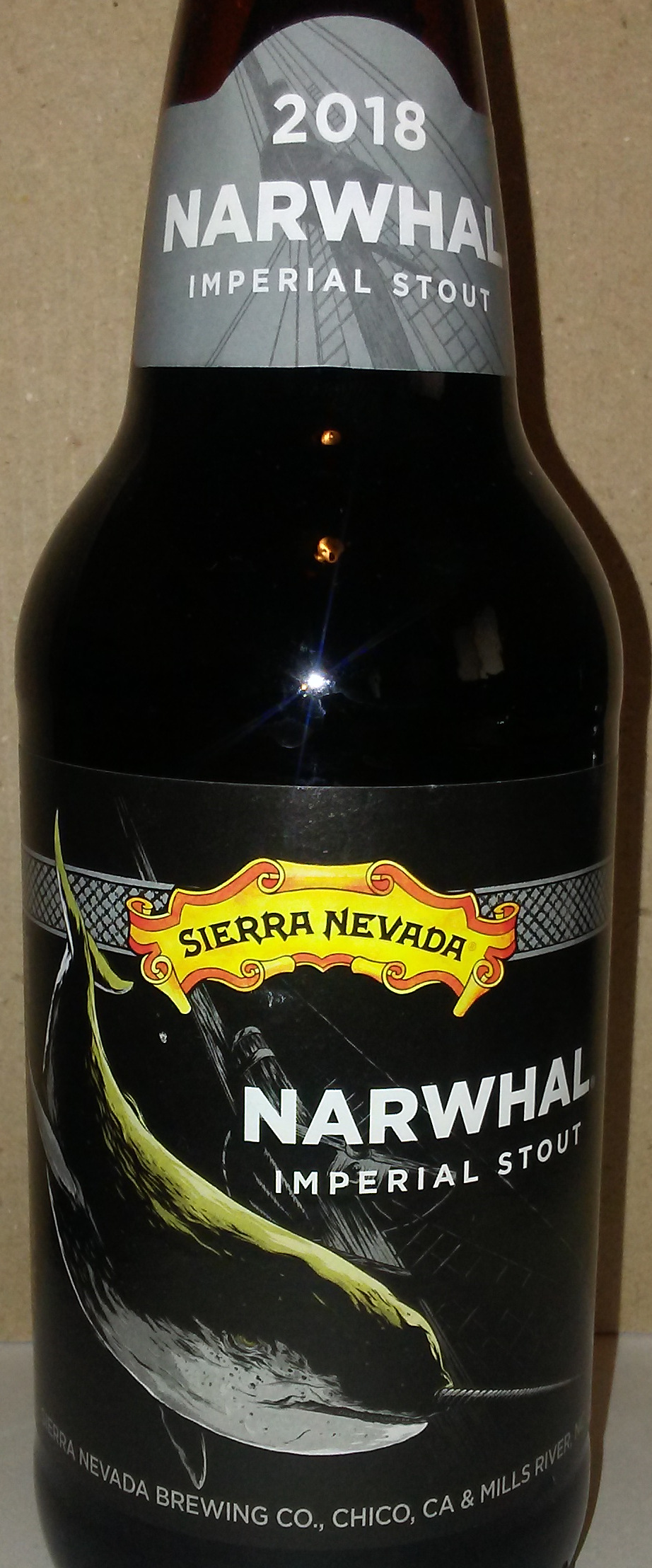
Sierra Nevada
Narwhal

== Pastry stout ==
A pastry stout refers to a sweet stout style which is brewed to emulate the taste of various desserts. Many breweries who produce pastry stouts will experiment with flavours such as chocolate, marshmallow, maple syrup, vanilla or fruit.

== See also ==
- Porter
