= Bermondsey Beer Mile =

Group of breweries in south London

Coordinates: 51.4978°N 0.0723°W

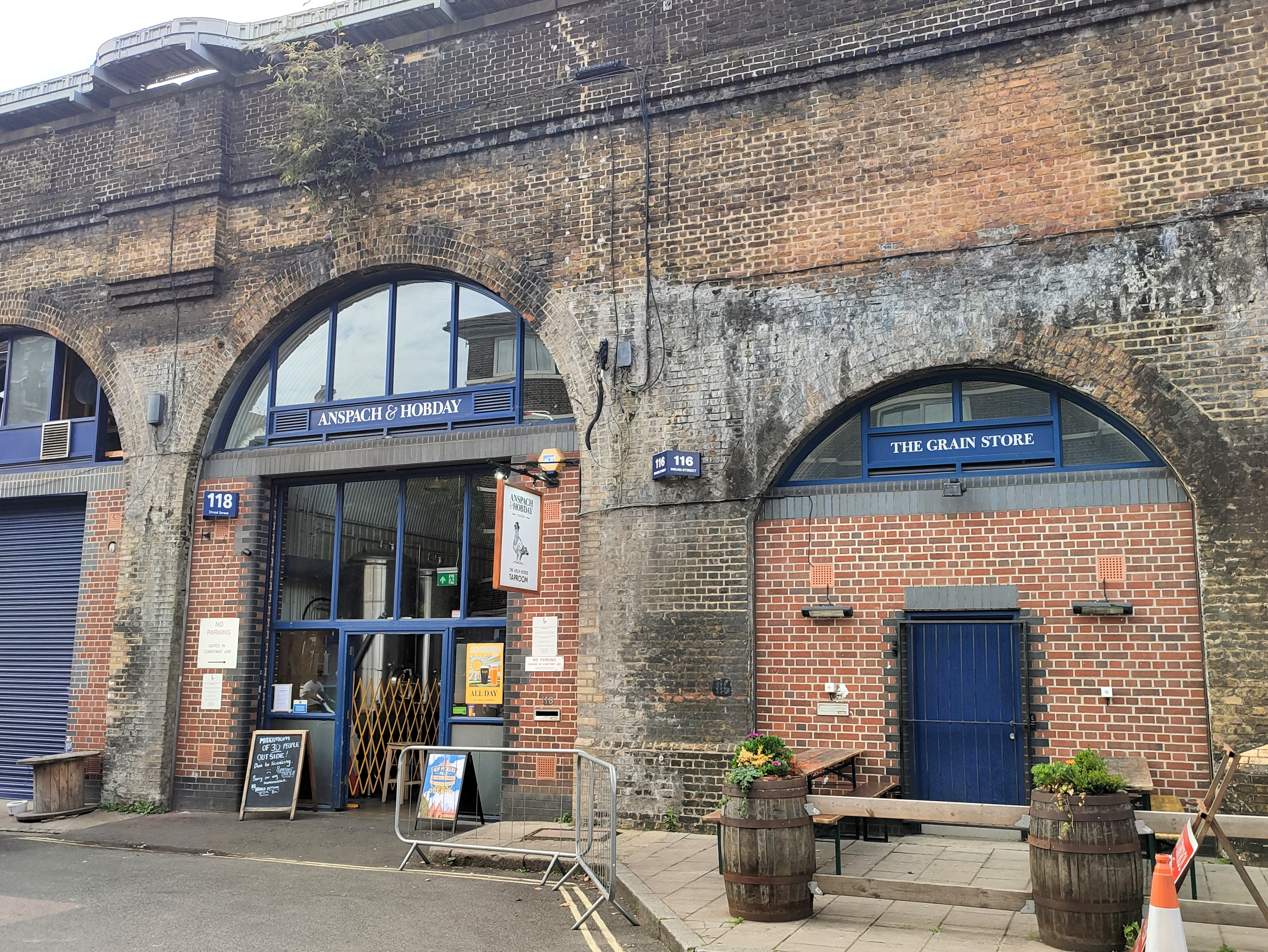
Anspach & Hobday, one of the breweries on the mile in 2014

The Bermondsey Beer Mile is an informal collection of microbreweries located in Bermondsey, London. Most of the breweries operate in and around the arches of the railway viaduct heading into London Bridge and Cannon Street station running approximately two miles and stretching roughly from Tower Bridge to St James's Road.

The first brewery, The Kernel, was opened in 2009 with many following due to the relatively cheap rent under the unused railway arches. Many of the breweries located within the arches relocate to larger venues as demands rise, but the beer mile itself remains well occupied by breweries and brewery owned taprooms.

A 2025 Associated Press report described the area as a loose collection of taprooms and bottle shops, rather than only breweries. A travel guide has suggested starting at Maltby Street Market, near London Bridge station, to eat before beginning the route.

The beer mile has faced criticism from local residents for creating a rowdy atmosphere as a result of attracting pub crawls and stag dos as well as generally creating unmanageable crowds. Overall however the beer mile has received acclaim for the quality of drinks on offer, as well as becoming a cultural institution of London.

== See also ==
- Blackhorse Beer Mile
