= Brigitte Kernel =

French writer and journalist

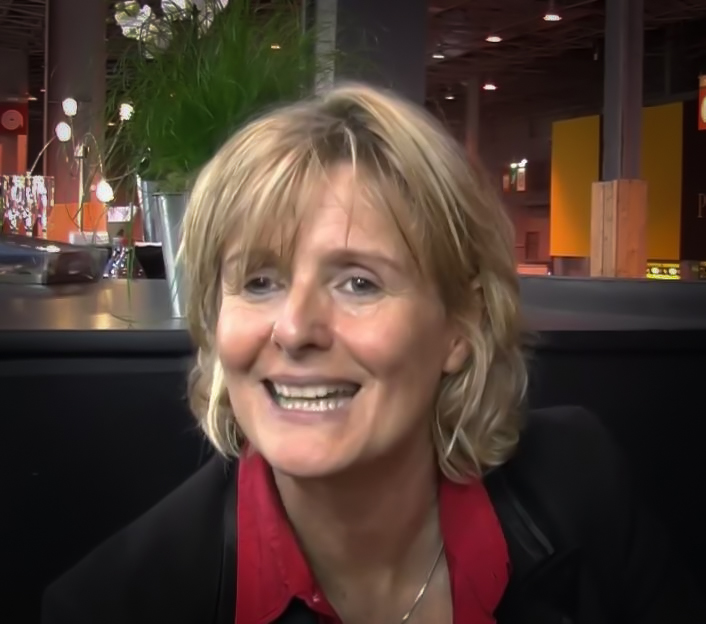
- Occupations: literary journalist and writer

Brigitte Kernel (born 1959) is a French literary journalist and writer. She lived in Nancy until she was 19 years old. She remains today in Paris.

== Life ==
Brigitte Kernel was born in Rambervillers in the Vosges, in 1959. From childhood, she kept a diary. At 17, she sent her poems to the publisher Pierre Seghers. The latter gives her advice and encourages her in writing. The meetings have a great importance in the life of Kernel who was also advised by Simone Gallimard and Françoise Sagan with whom she was friends. Today, Kernel devotes herself exclusively to writing.

After having been a journalist at the Matin de Paris and then director of the programs of José Artur Pop Club and Who do I have the honor ?, she was producer-host of literary programs on France Inter, from 1990 to 2015.

For twenty years, Kernel wrote the weekly serials Cadavre Exquis for her literary programs, part of which is published by Librio. She has also been a literary columnist in Place aux livres on LCI with Patrick Poivre d'Arvor and in Rive droite / Rive gauche by Thierry Ardisson on Paris Première. She has, in her literary programs on France Inter, interviewed: Fred Vargas, David Foenkinos, Douglas Kennedy, Tatiana de Rosnay, Valerie Tong Cuong, Jean Teulé, Christine Angot, Amelie Nothomb, Grégoire Delacourt, Florian Zeller, Serge Joncour, Bernard Werber. And in their latest books François Nourissier, Cavanna, Andrée Chédid, Robert Sabatier, Bernard Clavel, Bernard Giraudeau, Regine Deforges, Genevieve Dormann, Yves Navarre. She is a member of the Lilac Academy which she, with Marie-Christine Imbault, co-founded in 2008.

== Works ==
=== Novels ===
- Une journée dans la vie d'Annie Moore, prix Paul Guth du Premier Roman, Presses de la Renaissance, 1993, ISBN 9782290323687
- Un animal à vif, Le Masque, 2001, ISBN 9782702479681
- Autobiographie d'une tueuse, Flammarion, 2002, ISBN 9782290038000
- Tout sur elle, Flammarion, 2003, ISBN 9782080684585
- Les Falaises du crime, Flammarion, 2004, ISBN 9782286001988
- L'amant de l'au-delà, Éditions du Masque, 2005, ISBN 9782702480199
- Fais-moi oublier, Flammarion, J'ai Lu, 2007, ISBN 9782081208049
- Ma psy, mon amant, Léo Scheer, 2011, ISBN 9782714440310
- À cause d'un baiser, Flammarion, 2012, ISBN 9782081267091
- Andy, Plon, 2013, ISBN 9782259215923
- Dis-moi oui, Flammarion, 2015, ISBN 9782081305069
- Agatha Christie, le chapitre disparu, Flammarion, 2016, ISBN 9782081365629
- Jours brûlants à Key West, Flammarion, 2018, ISBN 9782081411234

=== Biographies ===
- Michel Jonasz, Seghers, 1985, ISBN 9782221044094
- Véronique Sanson, Seghers, 1990, ISBN 9782232101014
- Louis de Funès, Editions du Rocher, 2004, ISBN 9782268051338
- Louis Chedid, sa vie et ses chansons, Seghers, 2005 ISBN 9782232122569
