= The Kernel Brewery =

British brewery

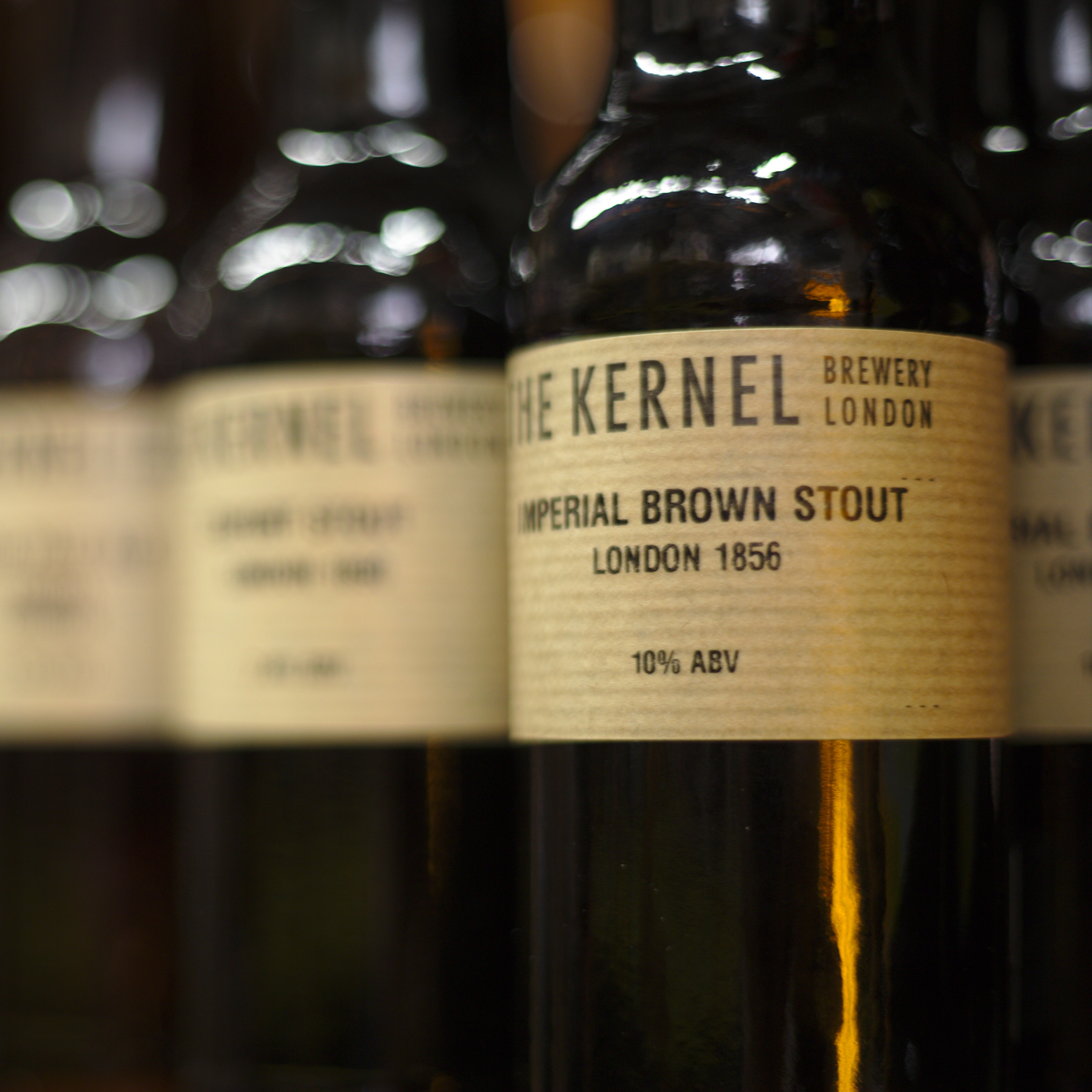
- The Kernel Imperial Brown Stout
- Industry: Brewing
- Founded: 2009
- Founder: Evin O'Riordain
- Headquarters: Bermondsey, London, England
- Products: Craft beer
- Website: www.thekernelbrewery.com

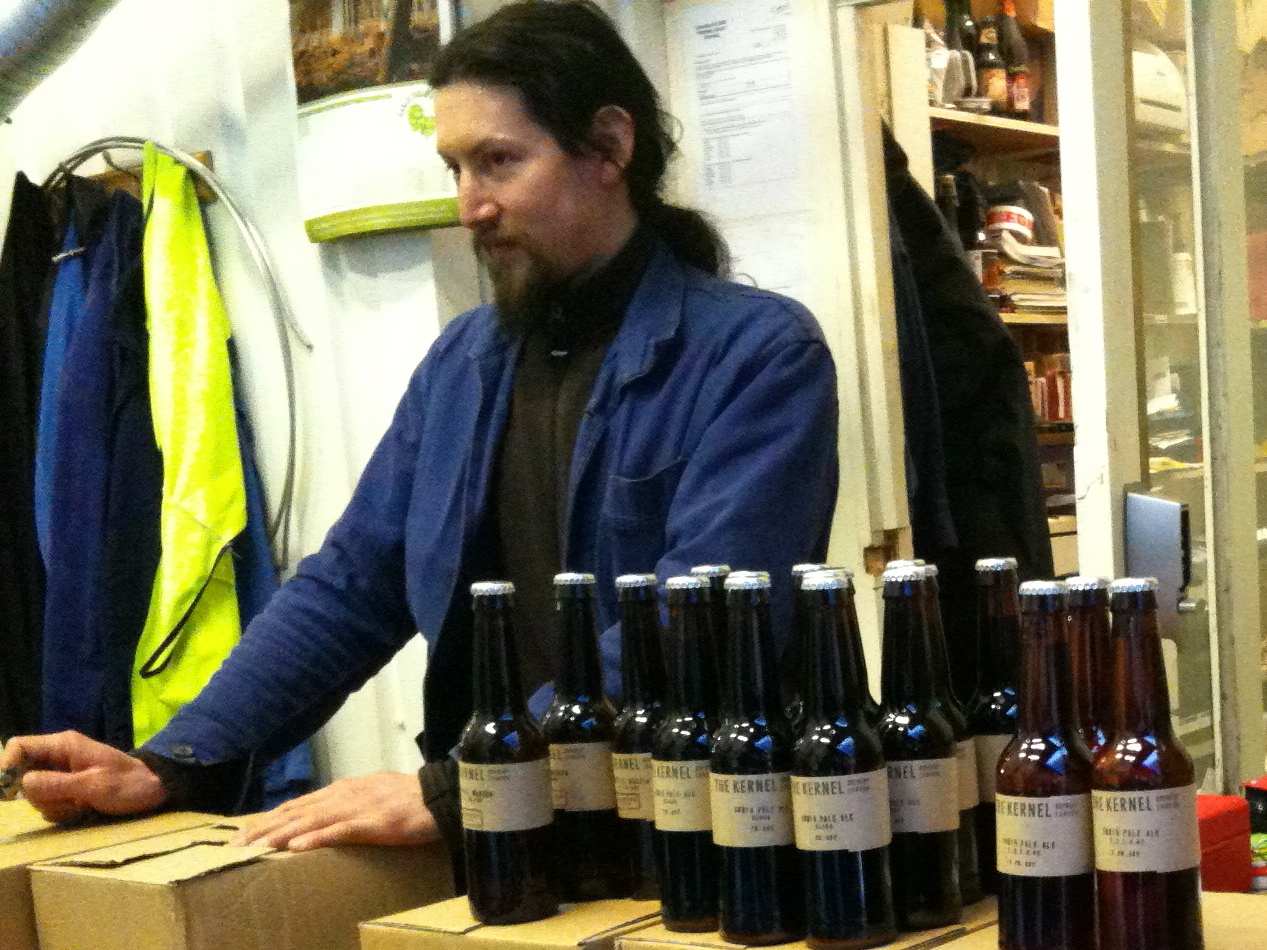
Founder Evin O'Riordain in 2011

The Kernel Brewery is a London-based brewery founded in 2009 by Evin O'Riordain in Bermondsey, England. It was one of London's first craft brewers, and within 10 years it had helped inspire the establishment of around a hundred new microbreweries in the capital. The original 6.5 hectolitre brewhouse on Druid Street was replaced in 2012 by a 32hl plant on Dockley Road in the Spa Terminus railway arches.

The brewery's ethos strongly favours quality over quantity, with quality control being at the heart of the operation. Around 90 percent of the beer Kernel produces is sold in London. O'Riordain says that "the demand is way higher than anything we can produce, it's far beyond our capacity."

Kernel avoids unnecessary experimentation, with each brew being an intentional evolution of the previous batch. The hop types used are constantly changing in line with availability and the varying characteristics of each year's crop.

The brewery produces a wide range of beer styles, from American-inspired pale ales and IPAs to sours and traditional London porters and stouts. "Table Beer" was first brewed in 2012, and has grown to be one of the company's most popular beers. The 3 percent abv pale ale is brewed weekly, and is influenced by the British tradition of cask conditioned beers.
