= National Beer Day =

National Beer Day may refer to:

- National Beer Day (United Kingdom), a holiday on June 15
- National Beer Day (United States), a holiday on April 7

== See also ==
- Beer day
- Beer Day (Iceland), a holiday on March 1
- International Beer Day
