= Beer in Iceland =

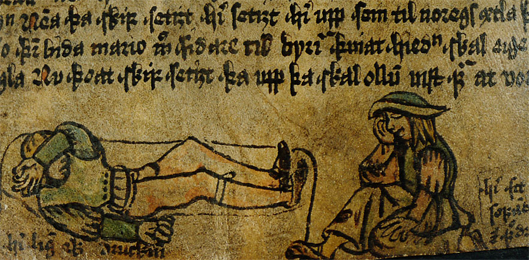
- An illustration of two intoxicated 15th century Icelanders
- Type: Beer
- Origin: Early settlers

Beer in Iceland likely dates back to the island's settlement by Norsemen. In more modern history beer was effectively banned in Iceland for most of the 20th century. Since that ban was lifted in 1989, Iceland's consumption of beer has increased markedly and new breweries have begun to emerge.

== Early history ==
Iceland's early settlers came from cultures where drinking beer and mead was commonplace. Poems such as the Hávamál reference the drinking of ale (öl). The climate of Iceland (particularly the cooling trend of the Little Ice Age, c. 1300–1850 locally) may have made beer production difficult as it became impossible to produce barley domestically.

== Prohibition ==
By the early 20th century, Icelandic attitudes toward beer and alcohol had shifted. A temperance movement similar to that in other countries pushed for a ban on moral grounds. In Iceland there was a political aspect to the movement as well: as the Icelandic independence movement began to form, beer was often associated with Denmark and thus "not the patriotic drink of choice."

In a 1908 referendum, 60.1% of voters approved a complete ban on alcohol set to take effect on January 1, 1915. This ban was partially lifted in 1921 in response to a trade dispute with Spain and Portugal; the two countries threatened to stop importing Iceland's salt cod if they did not allow for the importing of Spanish and Portuguese wines. Public support for the complete ban eventually began to fade and, in a 1933 referendum, 57.7% of voters approved lifting the ban.

Despite the referendum lifting prohibition, beer was still prohibited from containing more than 2.25% alcohol by volume (well below the 4–5% of an average beer). Some full-strength beer was smuggled into the country or produced by homebrewers. Icelanders also worked around the restriction by adding strong alcohol, such as Brennivin, to their beers which, while effective, was described by historian Unnar Ingvarsson as tasting "interesting and totally disgusting."

In 1979, an Icelandic businessman, Davíð Scheving Thorsteinsson, attempted to bring beer into the country after a business trip. His beer was confiscated but he refused to pay the fine, arguing he should have the same right to purchase beer from a duty-free shop that airline personnel and foreign tourists were allowed to. While he lost his case the resulting press and attention provoked a new law which permitted Icelanders to bring 6 litres (12.2 pints) of foreign beer into the country.

In May 1988, the Althing passed legislation legalizing beer above 2.25% ABV. The restrictions were lifted on March 1, 1989. The lifting of restrictions on beer is celebrated as Beer Day on March 1.

== Post-prohibition ==
After the prohibition on beer was lifted, Icelandic drinking habits shifted away from hard alcohol to beer and wine. Between 1989 and 2007, per capita liquor sales decreased by nearly half while per capita beer sales more than doubled. Sales in 2007 were 19.4 million litres. A 2014 World Health Organization report showed that 62% of the alcohol consumed by Icelanders came from beer.

The two largest domestic brewers in Iceland are Egill Skallagrímsson Brewery and Víking (part of Coca-Cola European Partners). Beginning in the late 2000s more small craft brewers have emerged which produce a wider variety of styles and have even won international awards for their beers. The terms brugghús and ölgerð are the most commonly encountered term for brewery.

== Beer sales ==
Off-premises alcohol sales in Iceland are available only through the state-owned State Alcohol and Tobacco Company of Iceland (ÁTVR). They operate a chain of 46 stores called Vínbúðin. A bill was proposed in 2015 to end the state's monopoly on alcohol sales.

== Beer brands ==
This is a non-exhaustive list of Icelandic beer brands.

- 6a Kraftöl in Akureyri
- 22.10 Handverksbrugghús in Grindavik (founded 2019)
- Austri brewery in Egilsstaðir (founded in 2017)
- Álfur brewery in Garðabær (established 2018)
- Beljandi Brewery in Breiðdalsvík (founded 2017)
- The Icelandic Beercenter - Bjórsetur Íslands (Established 2007)
- Borg Brewery in Reykjavík (founded in 2010 within Ölgerðin)
- Bruggsmiðjan Kaldi Brewery / The Beer Spa (founded 2006)
- Bryggjan brewery in Reykjavík (established 2015, bankrupt 2020)
- Dokkan Brewery in Ísafjörður (established 2017)
- Unique Ölgerð in Akureyri (founded in 2010 within Vifilfell)
- Gæðingur Öl in Kópavogur (founded 2011) - Gæðingur Brugghús
- Húsavík Öl in Húsavík (founded 2017)
- Jón Ríki Brewery / Restaurant in Höfn
- KHB Brugghús Brewery & Distillery in Borgarfjörður (founded 2020)
- Lady Brewery in Reykjavík (founded in 2017 as a nomadic brewery)
- Litla Brugghúsið in Garður (founded 2020)
- Malbygg in Reykjavík (founded 2017)
- Og natura in Hafnarfjörður
- RVK Bruggfélag, currently named RVK Brewing Co. (established 2017)
- Sanitas (founded in Reykjavík in 1905, merged with Sana and moved to Akureyri in 1978 and first started beer production)
- Segull 67 in Siglufjörður (founded 2015)
- Smiðjan Brugghús in Vík (established 2018)
- Steðji Brugghús in Borgarfjörður (founded 2012)
- The Brothers Brewery in the Westman Islands (founded in 2013 as a home brewer in the basement, received a production license at the beginning of 2016)
- Vífilfell in Reykjavík (founded in 1942, Sól-Víking merged under the Vífilfell brand and first started beer production)
- Víking hf in Akureyri (founded in 1939 as Efnagerð Siglufjörður, became Efnagerð Akureyrar in 1962 and started beer production as Sana hf in 1966, merged with Sanitas under its brand in 1978, became Víking hf in 1994, merged with Sól hf in 1997 and became Sól-Víking, merged with Vífilfell under its brand).
- Ægir Brewery in Reykjavík (founded in 2015)
- Ölgerðarhús Reykjavíkur (1912-1915)
- Ölgerðin Egil Skallagrímsson in Reykjavík (founded 1913)
- Ölgerðin Óðinn in Reykjavík (founded 1944)
- Ölgerðin Þór in Reykjavík (founded 1930, merged with Egil 1932)
- Ölverk Pizza and brewery (founded in Hveragerði 2017)
- Ölvisholt brewery in Flóahreppur (founded 2007)

== See also ==
- Beer and breweries by region
- Beer Day (Iceland)
