= Green beer (disambiguation) =

Green beer can refer to:

- Green beer, which is beer that is colored green
- For rough or immature beer see Brewing.
- For Miami University's celebratory day of drinking beer dyed green see Green Beer Day.
