= Egill Skallagrímsson Brewery =

Icelandic brewery and beverage company

Coordinates: 64°07′25″N 21°48′06″W

Ölgerðin Egill Skallagrímsson
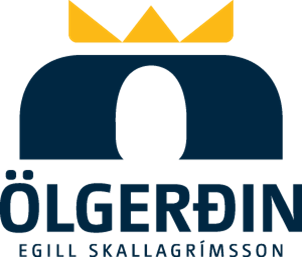
- The Olgerdin logo
- Industry: Beer, non-alcoholic beverages
- Founded: 1913; 113 years ago in Iceland
- Founder: Tómas Tómasson
- Headquarters: Reykjavík, Iceland
- Key people: Andri Thor Gudmundsson (CEO); Bogi Þór Siguroddsson (Chairman); Jón Þorsteinn Oddleifsson (CFO); Margrét Arnardóttir (CTO)

Olgerdin (Icelandic: Ölgerðin Egill Skallagrímsson) is an Icelandic brewery and beverage company based in Reykjavík. Established on 17 April 1913, the oldest beer-producing factory in Iceland. Annually, it produces 45 million liters of beverages. The brewery is named for Egill Skallagrímsson, an early inhabitant of Iceland and main character of Egil's Saga.

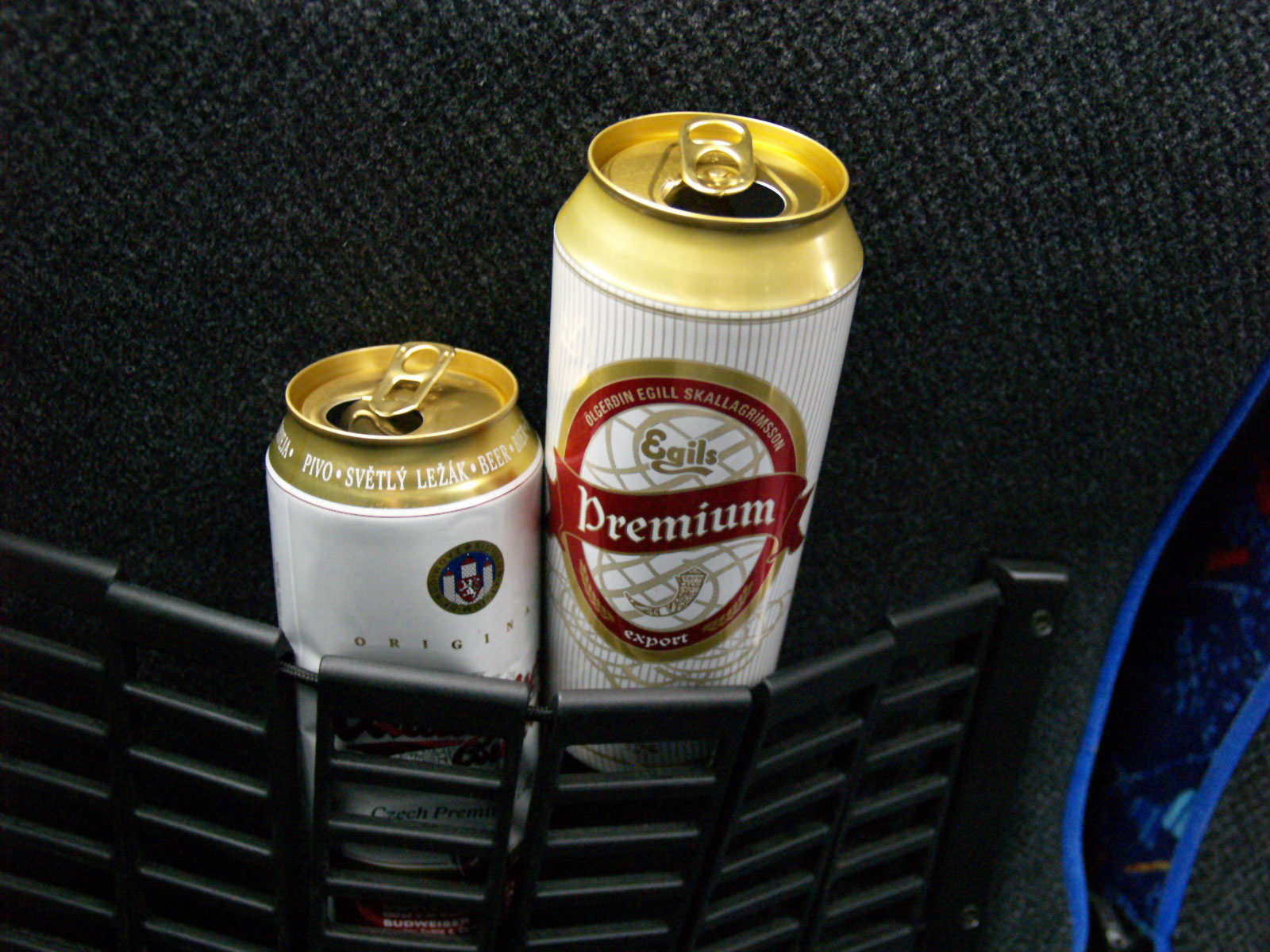

== History ==
The company was established on 17 April 1913 by Tómas Tómasson, who began production of a (1% alc/vol) beverage, malt extract. Today it is the oldest beer-producing factory in Iceland; and now it's also a wholesaler of food and beverages. At first, the operations of Ölgerðin Egill Skallagrímsson were based in two bedrooms in the basement of the Þórshamar house at Templarasund in Reykjavík, which Tómas had leased. Today, this house is owned by the Icelandic parliament (Althing). A year later, the company moved to the Thomsen house at Tryggvagata, and with this, the operating area grew significantly.

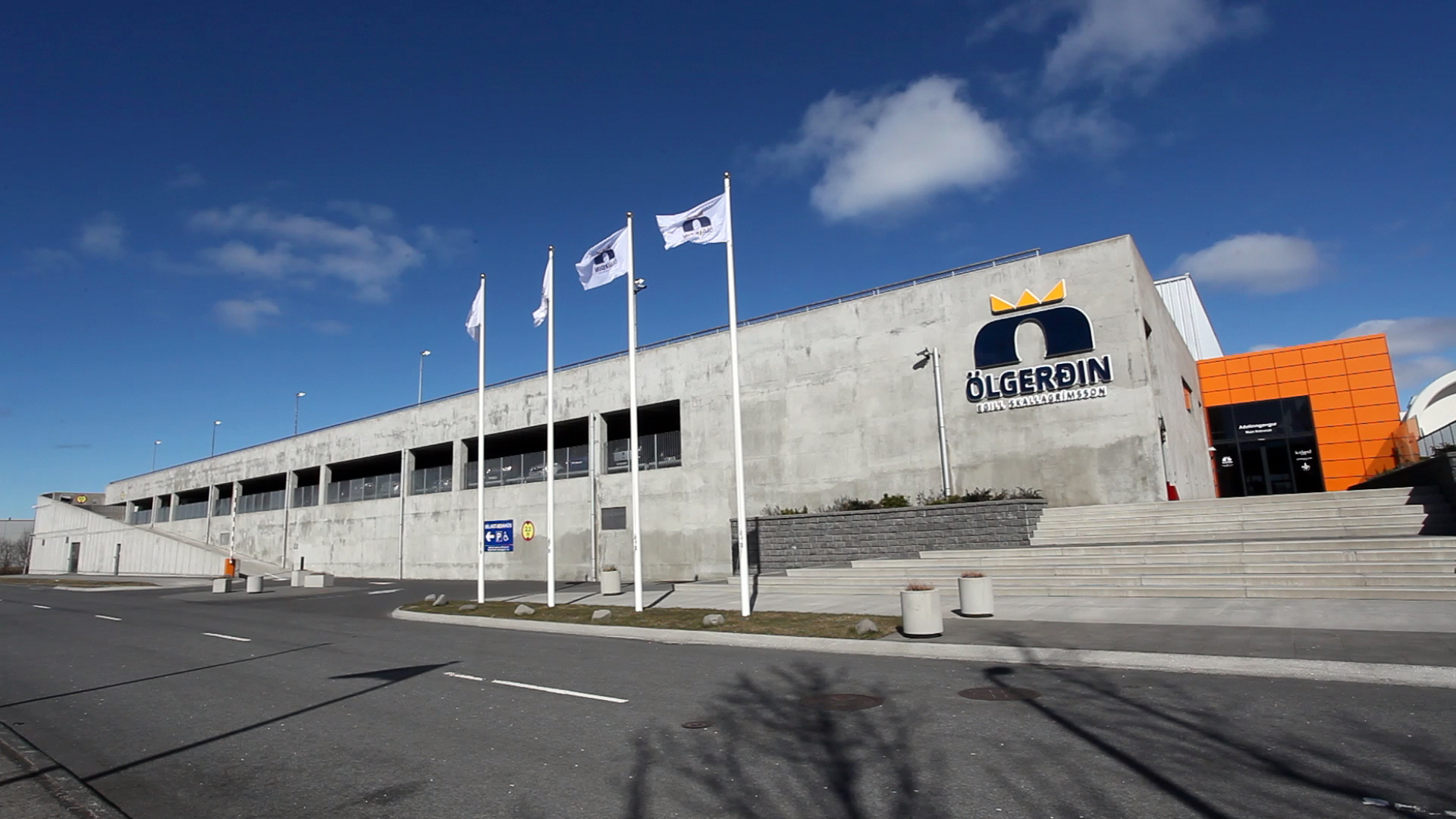

The scope of operations was not large at first. The brewing boiler was only 65 litres, and bottles were closed by pushing the cap onto the bottle with a flat palm and binding it with wire. During the first production year, Ölgerðin sold around 38 thousand litres, mostly malt extract and white beer. The light beer Egils Pilsner came to market in the same year, as the ban on alcohol was implemented in 1915, after which it was illegal to produce alcoholic beer with more than 2.25% alcohol content. Generally, brewmasters from Germany and Denmark were hired to oversee the beer production. The company also produces soft drinks (e.g. Egils Appelsín).

Tómas Tómasson went to Copenhagen in 1915 to learn brewing at the Bryggeriet Stjernen and then in Germany, where he spent the next two years. Returning home in 1917, he bought his first building on Njálsgata on the crossroads between Njálsgata, Frakkastigur and Grettisgata, which was later renamed "Ölgerðartorfan". The company was located there for much of the 20th century. In the years 1924–1928, both a brewery and a yeast cellar were in use there. He built up a comprehensive brewery, fermentation and bottling facility.

In 1926, Ölgerðin sold a million bottles in one year. In the same year, Danish King Christian X made an official visit to Iceland. Subsequently, Ölgerðin was given the right to call themselves the "royal brewery".

The production of Egils Pilsner began in 1916; while the company claimed 1917 on the bottle for years. The company was the first to receive an exemption for the production of alcoholic beer in Iceland during the war, when it produced the Polar Ale for the British occupation forces. From 1951, Ölgerðin produced the Polar Beer for the US military base in Keflavik and then Export Beer, which the general population called Egils strong. After the beer ban was lifted in 1989, the brewery's main product was Egils Gull.

The production of soda drinks began in 1930, and Ölgerðin bought the soda drink factories Síríus and Kaldá. Ölgerðin was made into a corporation two years later and was merged with Ölgerðin Þór hf., which had been operating for two years. Þór had built a brewery at Rauðarárstígur, but it was closed during the merger. In 1955, Egils Appelsín (orange soda) was introduced. Sigurður Sveinsson, an employee of Ölgerðin created a recipe that was immediately appreciated by locals and has since then surpassed all other such drinks.

After Tómas died in 1978, in his nineties, his sons, Jóhannes and Tómas Agnar ran Ölgerðin Egill Skallagrímsson for almost a quarter of a century. In 2000, they decided to sell the family's share, and an agreement was reached at the end of the year with Íslandsbanki-FBA and the investment company Gilding. There was a change in ownership in April 2002, when Lind ehf., a subsidiary of Danól ehf., bought Ölgerðin. The operations of Lind and Ölgerðin were merged in the beginning of that year, and with this merger, the product availability of Ölgerðin increased substantially. In 2007, Októ Einarsson and Andri Þór Guðmundsson acquired Ölgerðin with Kaupthing bank, which later sold its shares to several bank executives.

Ölgerðin Egill Skallagrímsson produces 45 million litres of beverages every year, of which 10 million litres are brewed in the brewing boiler.

== Awards ==
Egils Gull earned the "World’s Best Standard Lager" at the World Beer Awards 2011 and Bríó won the best German-style Pilsner at the 2012 World Beer Cup.

Year	Prize	Style	Product	Competition
2004	Silver		Egils Gull	Monde Selection
2004	Silver		Egils Sterkur	Monde Selection
2004	Silver		Pilsner 4,5%	Monde Selection
2006	Silver		Egils Gull	Monde Selection
2006	Silver		Boli	Monde Selection
2006	Gold		Gull Lite	Monde Selection
2006	Bronze		Gull Lite	European Beer Star
2006	Silver		Boli	European Beer Star
2006	Gold	American-style low-carbohydrate light lager	Gull Lite	World Beer Cup
2007	Gold		Egils Gull	Monde Selection
2007	Gold		Boli	Monde Selection
2007	Gold		Gull Lite	Monde Selection
2008	Silver	International-Style Lager	Egils Gull	World Beer Cup
2008	Silver		Egils Gull	Monde Selection
2008	Gold		Boli	Monde Selection
2008	Gold		Gull Lite	Monde Selection
2008	Gold	Beers, waters, soft drink & other Non- Alcoholic Beverages	Gull Lite	World Selection
2008	Silver	Lager Brewery Section	Gull Lite	Australian International Beer Awards
2008	Silver		Boli	Australian International Beer Awards
2008	Bronze		Gull Lite	Australian International Beer Awards
2008	Gold	Metal Beers, waters, soft drink & other Non- Alcoholic Beverages	Boli	World Selection
2010	Bronze	International-Style Lager	Polar Beer	World Beer Cup
2011	Gold		Floridana Andoxun	The InterBev Awards
2011	Gold	World's best standard lager	Egils Gull	World Beer Awards
2012	Gold	German-style Pilsener	Bríó, Borg Brugghús	World Beer Cup
2012	World's Best	Pilsner Lager	Bríó, Borg Brugghús	World Beer Awards
2012	Europe's best	IPA Pale Beer	Úlfur Nr.3, Borg Brugghús	World Beer Awards
2013	Europe's best	Flavoured Beer Chocolate & Coffee	Myrkvi Nr.13, Borg Brugghús	World Beer Awards
2013	Europe's Bronze	Lager, German Pale	Bríó, Borg Brugghús	World Beer Awards
2013	Europe's Silver	Pale Beer IPA	Úlfur Nr.3, Borg Brugghús	World Beer Awards
2013	Europe's Bronze	Lager low carb	Gull Lite	World Beer Awards
2014	Gold	Herb and Spice Beer	Snorri Nr.10, Borg Brugghús	European Beer Star
2014	Silver	Imperial Stout	Garún Nr.19, Borg Brugghús	European Beer Star
2014	Gold	India Pale Ale	Úlfur Nr.3, Borg Brugghús	Global Craft Beer Awards
2014	Gold	Imperial Stout	Garún Nr.19, Borg Brugghús	Global Craft Beer Awards
2014	Gold	Pilsener	Bríó, Borg Brugghús	Global Craft Beer Awards
2014	Silver	Chocolate or Coffee Beer	Myrkvi Nr.13, Borg Brugghús	Global Craft Beer Awards
2014	Europe's Silver	Flavoured Beer Chocolate & Coffee	Myrkvi Nr.13, Borg Brugghús	World Beer Awards
2014	Europe's Silver	Stout & Porter Imperial	Garún Nr.19, Borg Brugghús	World Beer Awards
2014	Silver	International -style lager	Egils Gull	World Beer Awards
2015	Europe's Best	Strong Wheat Beer	Sólveig Nr.25, Borg Brugghús	World Beer Awards
2015	Best beer	By country	Garún Nr.19, Borg Brugghús	Rate Beer
2015	Silver	German-Style Festbier	Boli	European Beer Star
2016	"Certificate of Excellence"	Stout/Porter: Baltic Porter	Gréta Nr.27, Borg Brugghús	Brussel Beer Challenge
2016	Bronze	Baltic-style Porter	Gréta Nr.27, Borg Brugghús	European Beer Star
2016	Gold	Strong Smoke Beer	Surtur Nr. 30, Borg Brugghús	European Beer Star
2016	Gold	German-Style Dunkel Bock/Doppelbock	Boli Doppelbock	Brussels Beer Challenge
2016	Best beer	By country	Surtur Nr.38, Borg Brugghús	Rate Beer
2016	Best Brewery	By country	Borg Brugghús	Rate Beer
2017	Gold	World's best Flavoured Beer / World's best Wood Aged Beer	Surtur Nr.8.2, Borg Brugghús	World Beer Awards
2018	Gold	Best can design	Ástríkur Nr.51, Borg Brugghús	World Beer Awards
2018	Best beer	By country	Surtur Nr.8.8, Borg Brugghús	Rate Beer
2019	Best beer	By country	Garún Nr.19.3, Borg Brugghús	Rate Beer

== See also ==
- Egils Appelsín
- Beer in Iceland
- Beer Day (Iceland)
- Prohibition in Iceland
