= Icelandic referendum =

Icelandic referendum can refer to:

- Icelandic prohibition referendum, 1908
- Icelandic community service referendum, 1916
- Icelandic sovereignty referendum, 1918
- Icelandic prohibition referendum, 1933
- Icelandic constitutional referendum, 1944
- Icelandic loan guarantees referendum, 2010
- Icelandic loan guarantees referendum, 2011
- Icelandic constitutional referendum, 2012
- 2026 Icelandic European Union membership negotiations referendum
