= Sophie de Ronde =

British brewer (born 1983)

- Born: 1983 (age 42–43); England
- Education: Writtle University College
- Occupation: Brewer
- Known for: Founder of International Women's Collaboration Brew Day; Co-founder of Beer Day Britain

Sophie de Ronde (born 1983) is a British brewer. She has been head brewer of Suffolk-based Burnt Mill Brewery since 2017, and previously brewed at Brentwood Brewing Company between 2007 and 2014. In 2019, she was named "Brewer of the Year" by the British Guild of Beer Writers. De Ronde is the founder of the International Women's Collaboration Brew Day as well as being a co-founder of Beer Day Britain. Unusually for a brewer, she is unable to drink most beer as she is allergic to wheat and barley.

== Brewing career ==
De Ronde began her career in the beer industry working as a barperson and later cellar manager at The Hoop, a real ale pub in Stock, Essex. In 2007, she was appointed head brewer at Brentwood Brewing Company, a role she held for around seven years. While at Brentwood, she established International Women's Collaboration Brew Day (IWCBD) to mark International Women's Day (8 March). The event, first held in 2014, sees female brewers from around the world brew the same recipe, with proceeds from sales of the beer being donated to charity. By the following year, IWCBD had grown to more than 100 brewers taking part, and by 2018 there were 126 participants. Along with beer writer Jane Peyton and fellow brewer Sara Barton, de Ronde is also one of the co-founders of Beer Day Britain, an annual event taking place on 15 June intended to celebrate the UK beer scene.

In late 2014, de Ronde left Brentwood and took up a role as a product development and brewing technologist at Muntons, a malt manufacturer based in Stowmarket. The role involved assisting with the development of new beers, as well as creating malt extracts to be used in homebrewing. It was while in this role that de Ronde learned she was allergic to barley and wheat, two ingredients widely used in beer making.

No longer able to drink most beer, de Ronde considered leaving the industry, but eventually decided to continue and in 2017 she returned to brewing, being appointed head brewer at the newly-formed Burnt Mill Brewery outside Stowmarket. Her allergies led her to experiment with creating beers from grains not traditionally used in beer, such as oats. The condition also means that she has to wear a facemask and protective equipment when brewing beer containing barley or wheat. Within a year of opening, Burnt Mill was named "Best New Brewery in the UK" by beer scoring website Ratebeer, and in 2019, de Ronde was personally recognised for her brewing, being named "Brewer of the Year" at the annual British Guild of Beer Writers awards.

== Personal life ==
De Ronde has a bachelor's degree in equine science from Writtle University College.
