= Seafair, Richmond =

Neighbourhood in Richmond, British Columbia

Seafair
- Neighbourhood
- Location of Seafair in Richmond

- Location in Metro Vancouver
- Coordinates: 49.148332°N 123.181354°W
- Country: Canada
- Province: British Columbia
- City: Richmond

Population (2021)
  - Total: 16,070
- Forward sortation area: V7C, V7E

Seafair is a neighbourhood in Richmond, British Columbia, Canada. It occupies the western edge of Lulu Island along the Strait of Georgia. The residential community is bounded by Granville Avenue to the north, Railway Avenue to the east, Williams Road to the south, and the West Dyke Trail to the west.

The neighbourhood is anchored by Seafair Shopping Centre at the intersection of No. 1 Road and Francis Road. This commercial node provides the surrounding low-density residential blocks with grocery options, medical services, banking institutions, and local dining amenities. The area is largely characterized by its extensive single-family housing tracts, quiet residential street networks, and direct proximity to regional waterfront recreational corridors.

== History ==
=== Post-war suburban development ===
The primary development of the Seafair subdivision occurred between 1963 and 1964, spearheaded by Jack Wells of J.M. Wells Construction. Unlike early post-war developments that focused strictly on housing density, Seafair was deliberately marketed by Wells as a complete "lifestyle" destination rather than just a place to live. The promotional focus emphasized a community design that integrated residential blocks with dedicated community facilities, localized shopping infrastructure, and a layout intended to capture aspects of both urban convenience and rural country living.

Architecturally and structurally, the Seafair subdivision was defined by specific master-planned elements that set it apart from typical 1960s developments in Richmond. The neighbourhood was built out by a single developer utilizing wide, 10-metre road widths featuring integrated concrete curb and gutter drainage networks. Wells rejected a standard linear grid, opting instead for a curvilinear street layout characterized by numerous winding roads and quiet cul-de-sacs.

Housing styles were central to the identity of the subdivision, built with a consistency that relied on a curated selection of architectural packages developed and marketed specifically for Seafair. While many homes were variations of the mid-century split-level design, the neighbourhood also introduced highly unique architectural models, such as the "Scandia" design, alongside several distinct West Coast Modern styles. Subsequent developments altered the neighbourhood's uniform housing styles, blending the new with the old.

=== Seafair Arena ===
A major cultural and historical fixture unique to the community's history was the Seafair Arena (originally operating as the Gulf of Georgia Arena), located at the western terminus of Francis Road. Founded by local resident Dr. George Yates, the facility expanded from a grassroots curling rink into a significant regional sports venue. It famously housed the 26-team Seafair Senior Men's Hockey League and the Seafair Sports Lounge. Following the passing of owner Dr. George Yates, escalating real estate development pressures and estate tax restructuring forced the arena to close its doors permanently in the mid-1990s, after which the land was demolished to make way for residential development.

== Demographics ==
The 2021 census found that English was spoken as mother tongue by 52.3% of the population. The next most common mother tongue language was Mandarin, spoken by 17.4% of the population, followed by Cantonese at 14%.

Panethnic groups in the Seafair neighbourhood (2021)
Panethnic group	2021
Panethnic group	%
East Asian (Note: Statistic includes total responses of "Chinese", "Korean", and "Japanese" under visible minority section on census.)	52.6%
European (Note: Statistic includes all persons that did not make up part of a visible minority or an indigenous identity.)	27%
Southeast Asian (Note: Statistic includes total responses of "Filipino" and "Southeast Asian" under visible minority section on census.)	8%
South Asian	7.1%
Middle Eastern (Note: Statistic includes total responses of "West Asian" and "Arab" under visible minority section on census.)	1.3%
Latin American	0.8%
African	0.5%
Other/multiracial (Note: Statistic includes total responses of "Visible minority, n.i.e." and "Multiple visible minorities" under visible minority section on census.)	2.6%
Total population	100%
Note: Totals greater than 100% due to multiple origin responses

== Transportation ==
Commuting patterns within the neighbourhood reflect its low-density suburban design, characterized by a high reliance on private vehicular travel. According to municipal demographic data, 76.5% of employed residents drive to work independently, while 7.4% commute as passengers in a private vehicle. Public transit accounts for 10.2% of daily employment commutes. Active transportation modes represent a smaller portion of local trips, with 2.5% of residents walking and 1.8% cycling to their places of employment.

=== Public Transport ===
Translink serves bus routes through Seafair, providing the neighbourhood with direct connections to major transit hubs in Richmond, such as the Canada Line. It also provides access to other prominent commercial hubs in the city, such as Steveston and Brighouse. These bus routes include the 401 and the 406.

=== Cycling ===
Seafair features some designated bike routes that accommodate local commuting and recreational cycling. These include the Granville, Crabapple Ridge, Williams, Railway Greenway, and West Dyke Trail routes.

== Parks and recreation ==
In addition to smaller neighbourhood green spaces, Seafair features prominent access to municipal and regional recreational networks:

- West Dyke Trail: Extending along the entire western boundary of the neighbourhood, this flat gravel trail runs atop the primary flood-protection dyke. It offers unobstructed views of the Strait of Georgia, Vancouver Island, and the North Shore Mountains, serving as a popular route for walking, cycling, and birdwatching.
- Hugh Boyd Community Park: Situated on the eastern margin of Seafair along No. 1 Road, this expansive multi-use sports complex features tennis courts, the West Richmond Pitch & Putt golf course, and high-performance artificial turf sports fields.
- West Richmond Community Centre: Located adjacent to Hugh Boyd Park, this facility provides fitness amenities, preschool programming, and multi-purpose rooms for community workshops.

== Education ==
The neighbourhood's public schooling is administered by the Richmond School District. Elementary schools operating directly within the community boundaries include James Gilmore Elementary School, Alfred B. Dixon Elementary School, Quilchena Elementary School, and R.M. Grauer Elementary School.

The school board operates one secondary school in the Seafair area, Hugh Boyd Secondary School.
