= Smoking in Canada =

Smoking in Canada is banned in indoor public spaces, public transit facilities and workplaces (including restaurants, bars, and casinos), by all territories and provinces, and by the federal government. As of 2010, legislation banning smoking within each of these jurisdictions is mostly consistent, despite the separate development of legislation by each jurisdiction. Notable variations between the jurisdictions include: whether, and in what circumstances ventilated smoking rooms are permitted; whether, and up to what distance away from a building is smoking banned outside of a building; and, whether smoking is banned in private vehicles occupied by children.

Some municipalities have laws restricting smoking further than the applicable national/provincial/territorial legislation. There have also been significant changes to public smoking regulations across the country following the legalization of recreational cannabis on October 17, 2018. This has resulted in additional regulations pertaining to the public consumption of cannabis in each province, with varying similarity to regulations concerning tobacco consumption.

The federal government's smoking ban in workplaces and on common carriers applies only to the federal government and to federally regulated businesses, such as airports. Smoking rooms are not permitted. As of 2020, 12.9% of Canadians aged 15 and older smoke.

== History ==
The use of tobacco by the First Nations in Canada dates back centuries as a sacred plant with immense healing and spiritual benefits. They primarily consumed tobacco through pipes.

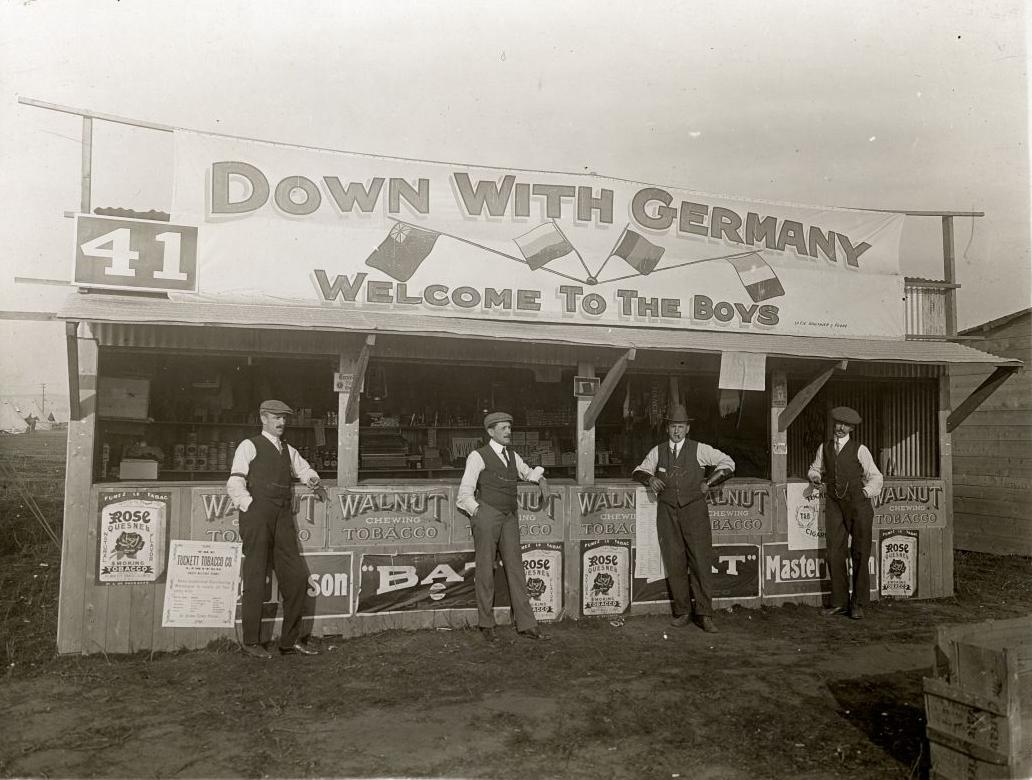
World War I, c. 1915. Free cigarettes for soldiers at Valcartier military base near Quebec City, Canada

The consumption of cigarettes in Canada began to rise in the early 20th century. According to Sharon Cook:

The pathfinders who first articulated women’s right to smoke were members of the middle and upper classes who were “untrammelled by conventional notions of decorum” for women, such as actresses, intellectuals, and “new women.” After all, these were the leaders of the 19th- and early 20th-century enfrachisement campaigns and other public-sphere campaigns which demanded the right to enter the professions, hold membership in artistic associations, and much else. It is not surprising that early examples of women pushing the boundaries of acceptable behaviours like smoking were women of privilege—intellectuals, artists, society women, and the like. The same process was at work in the masculine world of smoking with elitist elements arguing first for snuff, then cigars, pipes, and finally cigarettes.

Cook argues that the tobacco companies were looking for large profits which depended on sales to a much larger base of working women. They pitched their advertising to them, not to the elite. Thus, "The combination of cheap prices, reliable and theatrical possibilities as a wardrobe prop, [short] duration of the smoking experience and workplace norms of peer associations...explain cigarettes’ growing popularity over cigars and pipes for working women after World War I."

By the 1950s, smoking had become increasingly popular, and the Canadian tobacco industry was thriving. In the 1950s and early 1960s, the industry deliberately downplayed the health risks associated with smoking. They sought to stall the smoking and health issue, leading to a lack of awareness among the general public. Before 1960, there were only limited restrictions. Smoking was allowed in most public spaces, including airplanes, classrooms, offices, and even the House of Commons. Tobacco advertising was prevalent, and there were no restrictions on sales or packaging.

== Prevalence ==
In December 2002, Statistics Canada published a report on smoking prevalence from 1985 to 2001. In that report they found from 1985 to 1991, the prevalence of "current smoking" (which they defined as daily smokers and occasional smokers) declined overall, for both sexes and all age groups except for those aged 15 to 24. Even larger declines occurred from 1991 to 2001. While current smoking prevalence for youths did not significantly change from 1985 to 1994–1995, there was a significant decrease of 6 percentage points from 1994–1995 to 2001 (from 28.5% to 22.5%). All of the provinces experienced some level of decline over the entire 1985 to 2001 period. Declines in daily smoking prevalence occurred for both sexes and all age groups over the entire 17-year time span, although youth smoking did not start significantly declining until the mid-1990s. Overall, for daily cigarette consumption, smokers by 2001 had a significantly lower proportion of smoking 26 or more cigarettes daily compared with 1985 (14.0% to 5.8%). Most of the declines in the different sex or age groups occurred after 1991. At the same time, however, smokers in 2001 had a significantly higher proportion of smoking 1 to 10 cigarettes daily compared with 1985 (18.6% to 31.1%). Most of the decline occurred after 1991. As of 2008 the rate was estimated to be 18%, and declining. A 2011 survey estimates that 17% of Canadians smoke.

== Tobacco control ==
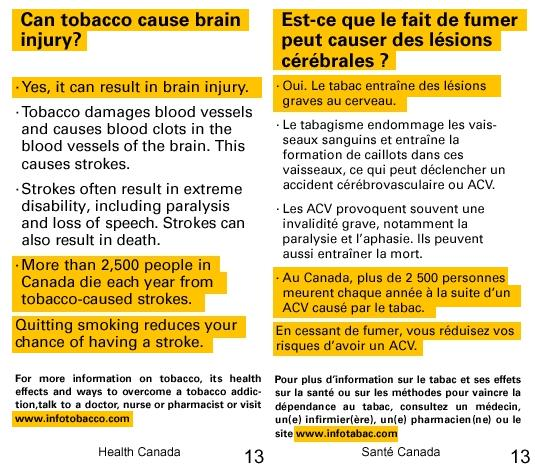
A warning message inside a package of cigarettes—mandatory in Canada

The Government of Canada legislated the mandatory display of warning messages on all cigarette packaging, including images depicting the long-term consequences of smoking. In 2001, Canada became the first country to implement tobacco packaging warning messages with pictures (Iceland introduced pictures in 1985)..

The Government of Canada also banned tobacco advertising. A loophole which allowed the display of a sponsor's logo at cultural events (for example, the Symphony of Fire fireworks display, once known as the Benson & Hedges Symphony of Fire) was closed in the late 1990s. The Government of Ontario sponsors a program named Stupid, with an accompanying website stupid.ca, that seeks to educate adolescents about the danger of smoking. The blue ribbon campaign was started in 1999 by the students at Hugh Boyd Secondary School in British Columbia and has gone national now.

=== Smoking cessation programs ===
There are numerous public and private smoking cessation programs in Canada.

== Overview by jurisdiction ==
=== Alberta ===
Alberta banned smoking in public spaces and workplaces, including within 5 metres (16 ft) of doors, windows, and outdoor air intakes, on 1 January 2008. A tobacco display ban (or "powerwall") law requiring shop-owners to keep tobacco sales out of sight was implemented 1 July 2008. As of 1 January 2009, cigarette sales in Alberta have been banned in all stores containing a pharmacy, at post-secondary educational institutions, and in healthcare facilities. It is illegal to sell to minors, and it is an offence for a minor to possess or consume tobacco in a public place, punishable by a fine up to $100. Retailers who sell tobacco products to minors are subject to a fine of up to $10,000 for a first offence, and up $100,000 for second or subsequent offences. As of November 14, 2014, it has been illegal to smoke in a vehicle with children under the age of 16. No one under the age of 18 is permitted to buy tobacco or vaping products.

On June 23, 2021, Alberta's cabinet amended the regulations enabled by the province's Tobacco, Smoking and Vaping Reduction Act, 2005 to allow for ventilated smoking rooms for the smoking of cigars. Such rooms are permitted so long as they meet the following conditions:

(a) the cigar lounge is designated as a cigar lounge by the manager;

(b) the cigar lounge has floor-to-ceiling walls, a ceiling and doors that separate the lounge visually and physically from any adjacent area in which smoking is prohibited under the Act;

(c) the cigar lounge has doors equipped with a properly functioning self‑closing device;

(d) the cigar lounge is equipped with a separate ventilation system that maintains negative air pressure at all times and exhausts smoke directly to the outside of the building in which the lounge is located;

(e) minors have no access to the cigar lounge;

(f) no service, including cleaning, is allowed in the cigar lounge during the hours of operation.

As of 2021, Alberta and Quebec are the only two provinces or territories which permit cigar lounges or any ventilated smoking rooms outside of nursing homes and long-term care facilities. Alberta is unique in being the sole province or territory which does not restrict the establishment of new lounges; Quebec's remaining lounges are preserved through a grandfather clause in its smoking statutes.

As of 2015, 15.8% of Alberta residents smoke.

=== British Columbia ===
British Columbia banned smoking in all public spaces and workplaces including, as of March 2008, within a 6-metre (20 ft) radius of doors, open windows and air intakes. Additionally, all commercial displays of tobacco visible to people under the age of 19 was banned in public areas under the same legislation. As of March 2008, ventilated smoking rooms are only permitted in nursing homes and care facilities. Smoking in a motor vehicle when a passenger is 16 years or under, regardless of the use of windows or sunroofs to vent smoke, is prohibited by section 231.1 of the Motor Vehicle Act. The smoking ban does not apply to hotel rooms, though many have private bans on the practice.

As of 2015, 10.2% of British Columbia residents smoke, the lowest of any province.

=== Manitoba ===
Manitoba banned smoking in all workplaces and enclosed public spaces on October 1, 2004. Specially ventilated rooms are not allowed in bars and restaurants. A law banning retail displays of tobacco and heavily restricting promotion and advertising of tobacco and tobacco-related products came into effect on 15 October 2005. An act banning smoking in vehicles when children under 16 are present became law July 15, 2010, and applies to all lighted tobacco products.

As of 2015, 14.8% of Manitoba residents smoke.

=== New Brunswick ===
New Brunswick banned smoking in public spaces and workplaces in October 2004. Ventilated smoking rooms are not permitted. Since January 1, 2009 tobacco products cannot be displayed prominently in stores. Since January 1, 2010, the ban has been expanded to include vehicles with children under 16 present. The legal age to purchase tobacco is 19.

As of 2015, 14.2% of New Brunswick residents smoke.

=== Newfoundland and Labrador ===
Newfoundland and Labrador banned smoking within public places such as day cares, schools, taxis, hospitals, retail stores, and recreational facilities in 1994. From 1994 to 2002 public places, such as food establishments, bars and bingo halls, and workplaces could allow smoking in designated smoking areas or rooms. In 2002, through an amendment to the Smoke-free Environment Act, smoking was banned in food establishments, shopping malls, transportation terminals, hotel/motel common areas, games arcades, public libraries and boys and girls clubs. In 2005, smoking was banned in all public spaces and workplaces, under the province's Smoke-Free Environment Act, including licensed liquor establishments and bingo halls. Enclosed, ventilated smoking rooms are permitted only in psychiatric facilities and long-term care facilities. Sales of tobacco are prohibited in places such as in retail stores that have a pharmacy, on university and college campuses, or recreational facilities. Smoking in a motor vehicle, when a person under the age of 16 is present, became illegal in 2011.

As of 2015, 18.5% of Newfoundland and Labrador residents smoke.

=== Nova Scotia ===
Nova Scotia banned smoking in public spaces and workplaces on December 1, 2006. Ventilated smoking rooms are permitted in nursing homes and care facilities. Tobacco products cannot be displayed prominently in stores. On April 1, 2008, smoking in a car with passengers under 19 inside became illegal. Minors are prohibited from possessing tobacco products.

As of 2015, 17.8% of Nova Scotia residents smoke.

=== Ontario ===
Ontario banned smoking in workplaces with some exceptions in 1990. Ontario banned smoking in public spaces and workplaces in 2006 with the passing of the Smoke-free Ontario Act and was the first province to outlaw the sale of tobacco in pharmacies in 1994. In 2008, a ban on retail displays of tobacco was implemented. Since January 21, 2009, smoking is banned in all vehicles if anyone under the age of 16 is present. As of January 1, 2015, smoking is prohibited province-wide on all bar and restaurant patios and within a 20-meter (66 ft) radius of all playgrounds and sports fields. Tobacco sales are prohibited on college and university campuses. As of January 1, 2018, hospital properties must be 100% smoke-free.

Many Ontario municipalities (cities, counties and regions) have passed smoke-free bylaws that are stricter than the provincial Smoke Free Ontario Act, such as City of Toronto, City of Ottawa, Region of Niagara, Region of Peel, City of Hamilton, and City of Barrie.

For example, as of April 2, 2012, in Ottawa, smoke free regulations prohibit smoking on all municipal properties, including parks, playgrounds, beaches, sports fields, fruit and vegetable markets and outdoor areas around City facilities. Outdoor restaurant and bar patios and terraces are also smoke free. Smoking has also been prohibited on all public transit (OC Transpo) properties including station platforms, since 2007. Fines for non-compliance range from $305 to $5000 as per the Provincial Offences Act.

Hamilton banned smoking on all municipal properties, including parks, playgrounds, beaches, sports fields on May 31, 2012. Any person who contravenes a provision of this by-law is guilty of an offence and upon conviction is liable to a maximum fine of $10,000.00.

In Toronto, Municipal Code prohibits smoking within 9 meters (30 ft) of an entrance or exit of any building used by the public. Smoking is also prohibited in all public squares and within 9 meters (30 ft) of park amenities such as playgrounds, sports fields, skate parks, ski hills, picnic areas, swimming pools, theatre space, splash pads, washrooms, beaches, park zoos and farms, and service waiting lines. In April 2019, a proposal brought forward by Councillor Ana Bailão and seconded by Councillor Mike Layton, called for a response to the issue of cigarette butt litter in front of businesses including bars, restaurants, and other establishments. The motion requests a review of the issue of cigarette butt litter, with consideration by the end of the fourth quarter of 2019 about introducing new regulations. Ones that would require business owners and operators to ensure that such litter is removed from in front of their premises as a condition of the issuance of a business licence.

In Ontario, where more than one regulation, act or bylaw exists, the one that is the most restrictive of smoking prevails.

As of 2015, 11.3% of Ontario residents smoke.

=== Prince Edward Island ===
Prince Edward Island banned smoking in public spaces and workplaces in 2003. Ventilated smoking rooms are only allowed in long-term care facilities.

As of 2015, 12.9% of Prince Edward Island residents smoke.

=== Québec ===
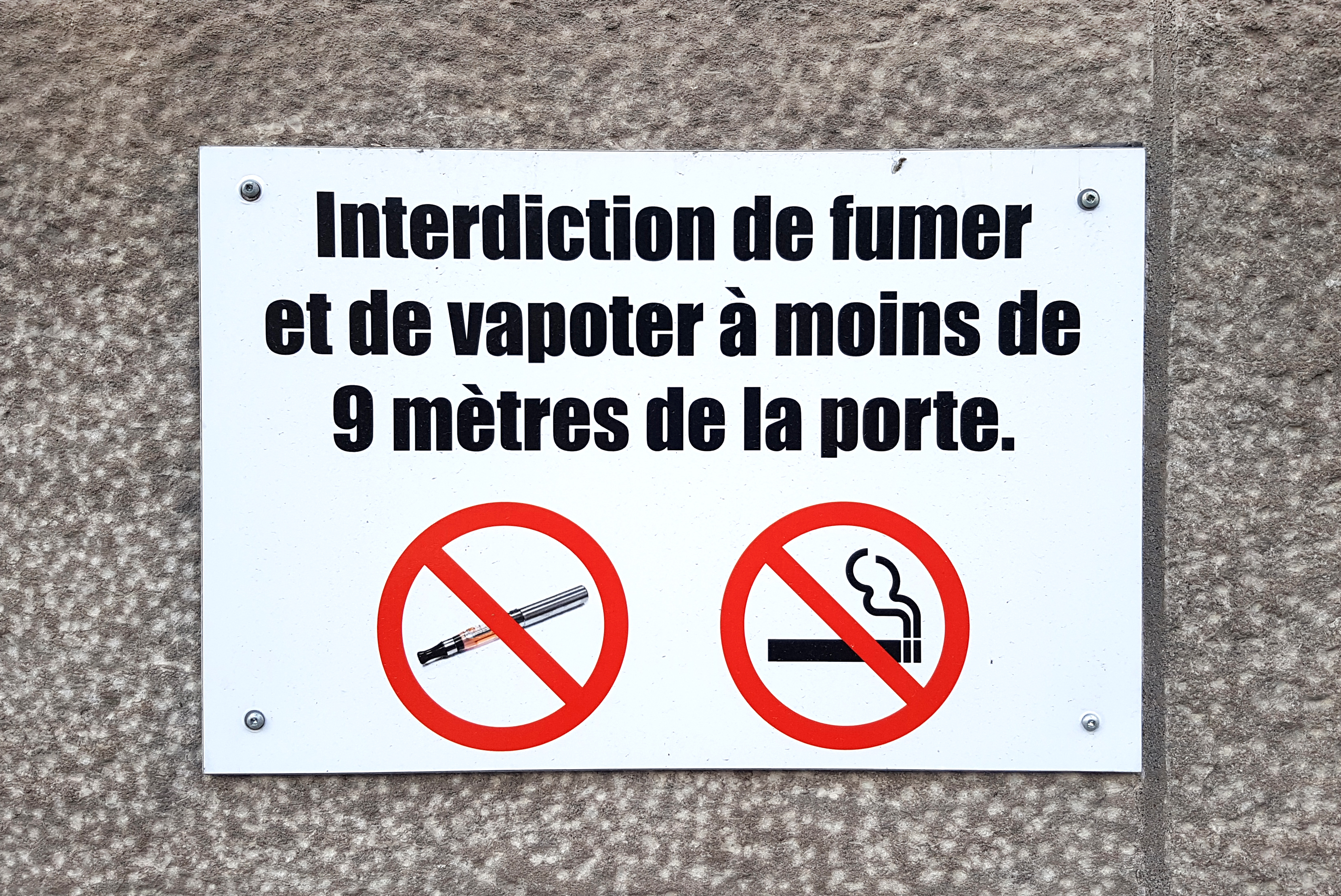
No smoking or vaping within 9 meters of the door (sign in Montreal)

Tobacco taxation in Quebec.

Quebec banned smoking in public spaces and workplaces, such as offices, hospitals, restaurants and bars on 31 May 2006. Smoking is banned within a 9 metres (30 ft) radius of the entrances of social services institutions such as hospitals, community centres, CEGEP, colleges and universities. Smoking is banned on the properties of elementary and high schools. The province eliminated designated smoking rooms in 2008. The law was amended by Bill 44 in November 2015. The sale of electronic cigarettes is regulated like tobacco, including restrictions on advertising. ID requirements for tobacco sales are stricter and fines are increased. It is prohibited to sell flavoured tobacco products, including menthol. All public organizations, such as hospitals and post-secondary education institutions, must adopt a smoke-free and smoking cessation policy and report to the government. Since May 26, 2016, smoking and e-cigarettes are banned on restaurant and bar patios and terraces, playgrounds and sports fields, including a 9 m (30 ft) radius. Smoking in a vehicle with children under 16 is also prohibited. As of November 2016, smoking was banned within a 9 m (30 ft) radius of all doors, windows and air intakes of any building open to the public. Standardized warning label sizes was applied to all tobacco packages.

As of 2021, Quebec and Alberta are the only two provinces or territories which permit cigar lounges or any ventilated smoking rooms outside of nursing homes and long-term care facilities. Alberta is unique in being the sole province or territory which does not restrict the establishment of new lounges; Quebec's remaining lounges are preserved through a grandfather clause in its smoking statutes. In Montreal, all cigar bars opened before May 10, 2005, were allowed to stay in operation, though future establishments were banned. There are also cigar lounges in Gatineau.

Contrary to stereotypes and popular portrayal, Quebec's smoking rate is around the Canadian average, and is lower than the smoking rate of the U.S. and far lower than that of France. As of 2015, 14.2% of Quebec residents smoke.

=== Saskatchewan ===
Saskatchewan banned smoking in public places on January 1, 2005, and banned smoking in workplaces on May 31, 2009. The province reinstated tobacco display ban (2005) requires shop owners to keep tobacco sales out of sight. There are fines of up to $10 000 for violation of the Tobacco Control Act which bans smoking in all public areas, indoor and outdoor, including clubs for veterans. Since October 1, 2010, smoking is prohibited if there are children under 16 years of age in the vehicle.

As of 2015, 16.9% of Saskatchewan residents smoke.

=== Northwest Territories ===
The Northwest Territories banned smoking in public places and workplaces on 1 May 2004.

=== Nunavut ===
Nunavut banned smoking in public spaces and workplaces, including within three metres (10') of entrances and exits to those buildings on May 1, 2004.

As of 2014, 62% of Nunavut residents smoke, the highest of any territory.

=== Yukon ===
The Yukon banned smoking in public spaces and workplaces on 15 May 2008 after passing an anti-smoking bill in 2007. It was the last of the provinces and territories to implement a ban.

== See also ==
- Rothmans, Benson & Hedges, the largest tobacco company
