= State Alcohol and Tobacco Company of Iceland =

Icelandic state-owned company

State Alcohol and Tobacco Company of Iceland Áfengis- og tóbaksverslun ríksins (ÁTVR)
- Company type: Government enterprise
- Industry: Sale of alcohol and tobacco
- Founded: 1961; 65 years ago
- Headquarters: Reykjavík, Iceland
- Key people: Ívar J. Arndal, president
- Website: vinbud.is

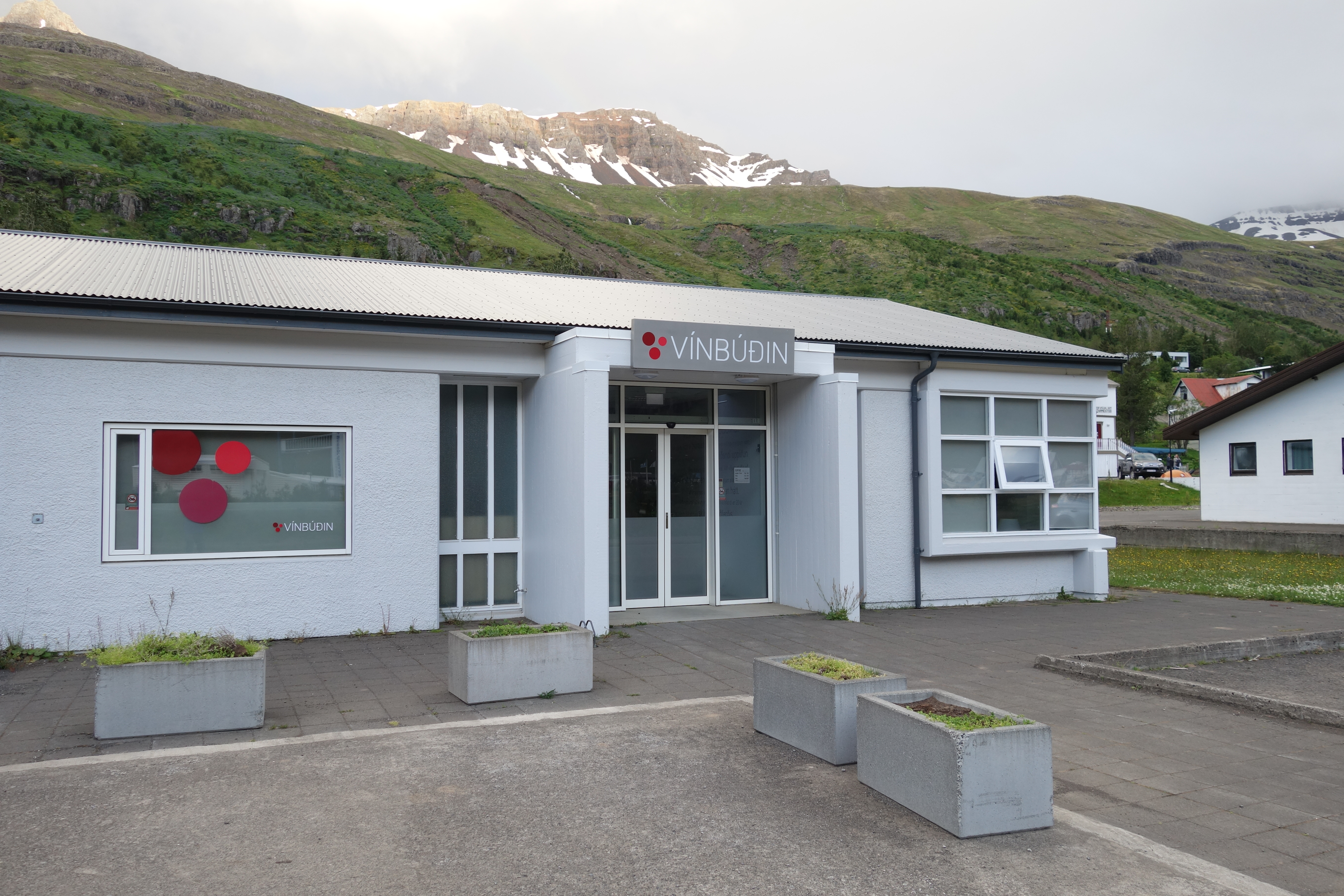
Branch of Vínbúðin (ÁTVR) in Seyðisfjörður.

The State Alcohol and Tobacco Company of Iceland (ÁTVR) is a state owned company that is the sole legal retail vendor of alcohol in Iceland. It runs a chain of 51 retail stores named Vínbúðin (the wine shop), known colloquially as Ríkið (The State). In addition it distributes tobacco to other retailers and assesses and collects tobacco tax.

Iceland has very high taxes on alcohol to curtail consumption and as a government revenue source. Tax rates are proportionate to the alcohol content.

The state run company is under the Ministry of Finance.

== See also ==
- Alcohol monopoly
- Beer in Iceland
- Prohibition in Iceland
- Smoking in Iceland
