= Viking Beer =

Icelandic beer brand

Víking Brewery
- Location: Akureyri, Iceland
- Opened: 1939
- Other products: Einstök – Separate brand, bottled in Akureyri
- Owned by: Coca-Cola European Partners (CCEP)

Active beers
- Víking Gylltur – Lager, 5.6% ABV
- Víking Lager – Lager, 4.5% ABV
- Víking Lite – Light Lager, 4.4% ABV
- Seasonal releases – Christmas, Easter, Summer
- Stout – Dark beer
- Organic Pils – Pilsner, organic
Name	Type

Viking Beer (or Víking bjór [ˈviːciŋk ˈpjouːr̥]) is an Icelandic brand, brewed by CCEP "Víking Brewery". The brewery is located in Akureyri, Iceland, just south of the Arctic Circle.

== History of the brewery ==
The history of the brand of Víking beer can be traced back to 1939 when Efnagerð Siglufjarðar was established in the town of Siglufjörður in Northern Iceland. In 1945, the brewery moved to Akureyri and the name was changed to Efnagerð Akureyrar. In 1962, a new factory was built at Furuvellir 18, where it is still located today. The brewery name was changed to Víking hf. in 1994. The brewery merged several times with other companies, and then in early 2001, the brewery merged with Vífilfell hf. thus creating the largest company in Iceland in the beverage industry. That company was bought by Cobega and later merged with Coca-Cola European Partners (CCEP), and operates as Coca-Cola European Partners Ísland ehf. (in Reykjavík, where Coca-Cola is still bottled), while Víking is still brewed in Akureyri.

== Market-share ==
Viking Gylltur was by far the most sold beer in Iceland in 2017, and all of Víking's beer has over a quarter of the Icelandic market share (or half of all non-imported beer).

=== Einstök brand ===
The Einstök brand (meaning one of a kind), is separate from Viking, while also bottled in Akureyri, and under CCEP, from the beginning mostly sold abroad.

== Beer types ==
Víking mainly produces lager beers (while their craft beer brands are different). The most popular ones are:

- Víking Gylltur, 5.6% ABV.
- Víking Lager, 4.5% ABV.
- Víking Lite, 4.4% ABV.

In addition to the above, the brewery also makes seasonal beers for Christmas, Easter and Summer, as well as some all year round special beers such as Stout and Organic Pils.
