= Women On Tap CIC =

Social enterprise for diversity in beer

- Type: Social enterprise
- Founded: 2016; 10 years ago
- Headquarters: Harrogate, United Kingdom
- Key people: Rachel Auty (Founder & Director)
- Website: womenontap.co.uk

Women On Tap CIC is a social enterprise that focuses on initiatives related to gender diversity and inclusion in the beer industry. Established in 2017, the organisation has hosted multiple festivals, events, and campaigns intended to highlight women’s contributions to brewing and beer culture, as well as to address perceived imbalances in representation and opportunity. As of 2025, Women On Tap CIC takes control of the campaign behind International Women’s Collaboration Brew Day.

== History ==
Women On Tap CIC was founded in Harrogate in 2017, beginning with a beer and arts festival designed to showcase women in the beer sector, including brewers, industry professionals, and enthusiasts. The first festival combined tastings, educational sessions, and creative elements, and subsequent editions continued to offer a mix of live events, workshops, panel discussions, and performances.

During the COVID-19 pandemic, Women On Tap CIC adapted its annual festival by delivering the programme online, including talks, tastings, music, yoga sessions, and panel discussions. By 2024, the organisation had run seven festivals and more than 100 events, along with multiple campaigns aimed at raising the profile of women in the industry.

In response to ongoing data suggesting slow progress in increasing women’s representation in beer, Women On Tap CIC convened a short-term advisory board in 2024 to review its mission, develop impact frameworks, and strengthen its financial resilience.

== Activities and initiatives ==
=== Festivals and events ===
The annual Women On Tap Festival (WOTFEST) remains the organisation’s flagship event. It features beer tastings, tap takeovers, educational panels, art exhibitions, charity fundraising and creative commissions, with a focus on spotlighting breweries and industry professionals who identify as women.

=== Education and outreach ===
The organisation collaborates with breweries, experts, and related businesses to offer discussions, tastings, brewery tours, and training sessions. These efforts aim to encourage dialogue, knowledge-sharing, and practical steps toward a more inclusive industry environment.

=== Creative commissions and partnerships ===
Women On Tap commissions creative works - ranging from podcasts and short films to digital art - on themes of equality and diversity in beer. It partners with breweries for special festival beers, collaborates with various sponsors who support its programming and has worked with the Society of Independent Brewers (SIBA) to create the first “Diversity Champion of the Year” category for their 2025 Independent Beer Awards.

== International Women’s Collaboration Brew Day ==
After International Women’s Collaboration Brew Day (IWCBD) took a hiatus in 2024, Women On Tap CIC agreed to help coordinate its return in 2025. With the theme “Unite Society”, the initiative encourages breweries worldwide to collaborate on new beers and commit to supporting women-focused causes. SIBA, WSET, and Simpsons Malt are among the partners involved in this initiative.

== Support and funding ==
Women On Tap CIC’s work is funded through sponsorships, donations, and partnerships with breweries, pubs, and arts organisations. Contributors have included Thornbridge Brewery, Cloudwater Brew Co, Northern Monk, Rooster's Brewery, Simpsons Malt, and Brew York.
