= Beer Day Britain =

Celebration of beer in the United Kingdom

Beer Day Britain is an annual event celebrating beer in the United Kingdom. The date has been celebrated annually on 15 June since 2015. It is supported by the British Beer and Pub Association, the Society of Independent Brewers (SIBA), and the Campaign for Real Ale (CAMRA).

== Origin ==
The date was chosen because 15 June is also the date that Magna Carta was sealed in 1215 and ale is mentioned in clause 35 of Magna Carta, which states:

Let there be throughout our kingdom a single measure for wine and a single measure for ale and a single measure for corn, namely 'the London quarter'

Beer Day Britain was instigated by beer sommelier, writer and drinks educator Jane Peyton, alongside brewers Sara Barton and Sophie de Ronde. It took place for the first time in 2015. The main focus of the day is the National Cheers To Beer that takes place at 7 pm when people also sing the Cheers To Beer anthem co-written by Peyton.

There had been an earlier attempt to set up a National Beer Day in 2009, when 43 Members of Parliament supported an Early day motion, as follows:

That this House welcomes the forthcoming National Cask Ale Week, the world's largest ale festival, from 6 to 13 April 2009, a week of campaigning across the United Kingdom to promote the importance and pleasures of drinking real ale in pubs; supports the aim of National Cask Ale Week to denote 6 April as National Beer Day; notes the economic strength of the cask ale industry as demonstrated by sales figures from the Small Independent Brewers' Association in November 2008; expresses hope that National Cask Ale Week will succeed in entering the Guinness Book of Records for the world's biggest toast, a record breaking attempt which will take place on 11 April 2009; and encourages hon. Members to support their local pub's participation in National Cask Ale Week.

However, this did not result in the repeated celebration of National Beer Day.

== See also ==
- List of food days
- Beer Day (Iceland)
- Green Beer Day
- International Beer Day
- International Women's Collaboration Brew Day
- National Beer Day (United States)
