= International Women's Collaboration Brew Day =

Annual celebration of women brewers

International Women's Collaboration Brew Day (IWCBD) is an annual event that takes place each year on International Women's Day (8 March). The event gathers women brewers around the world who brew a beer around that year's theme. It was established to raise awareness of women in the brewing industry, especially as beer brewmasters. It also networks women interested in brewing.

From 2025, the event is organised by Women On Tap CIC, marking its return after a year's hiatus with the theme UNITE SOCIETY. Brewers are encouraged to use the event to raise funds for, or donate to, women's causes. Commercial breweries are encouraged to commit to a minimum £100 donation to a non-profit women's organisation or group. The Society of Independent Brewers (SIBA) is the campaign’s headline partner, with Wine & Spirit Education Trust (WSET) on board as an Education Partner, and additional sponsorship pledged from Simpsons Malt.

== History ==
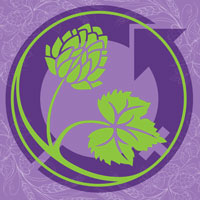
The first IWCBD logo, designed by Monarose Ryan

The idea for the IWCBD came from Project Venus member, Sophie de Ronde, who reached out to the Pink Boots Society in 2013 to start a "unified brew day." De Ronde wanted the day "to encourage women to brew together." The day was meant to coincide with International Women's Day and would "raise awareness of women in the brewing industry and raise money for local charities and Pink Boots Society." Brewing beer is a male-dominated industry and is "struggling with sexism and gender bias." Another participant said, "I'd like to normalize the idea that women can and do work in the brewhouse along with other departments in a brewery."

The first year, 2014, over 60 women in five countries brewed a pale ale called Unite. In 2015, 80 women from eleven countries worked together to brew Unite red ale. In South Africa, Apiwe Nxusani-Mawela, helped organize the first IWCBD event in Johannesburg. For 2016, the type of beer brewed was a gose. By 2018, the number of participating female brewers had increased to 126.

== See also ==
- List of food days
- Ladies' night
- Beer Day (Iceland)
- Beer Day Britain
- Green Beer Day
- International Beer Day
- National Beer Day (United States)
- SheBrew
