= Starobrno Brewery =

Czech beer brewery in Brno

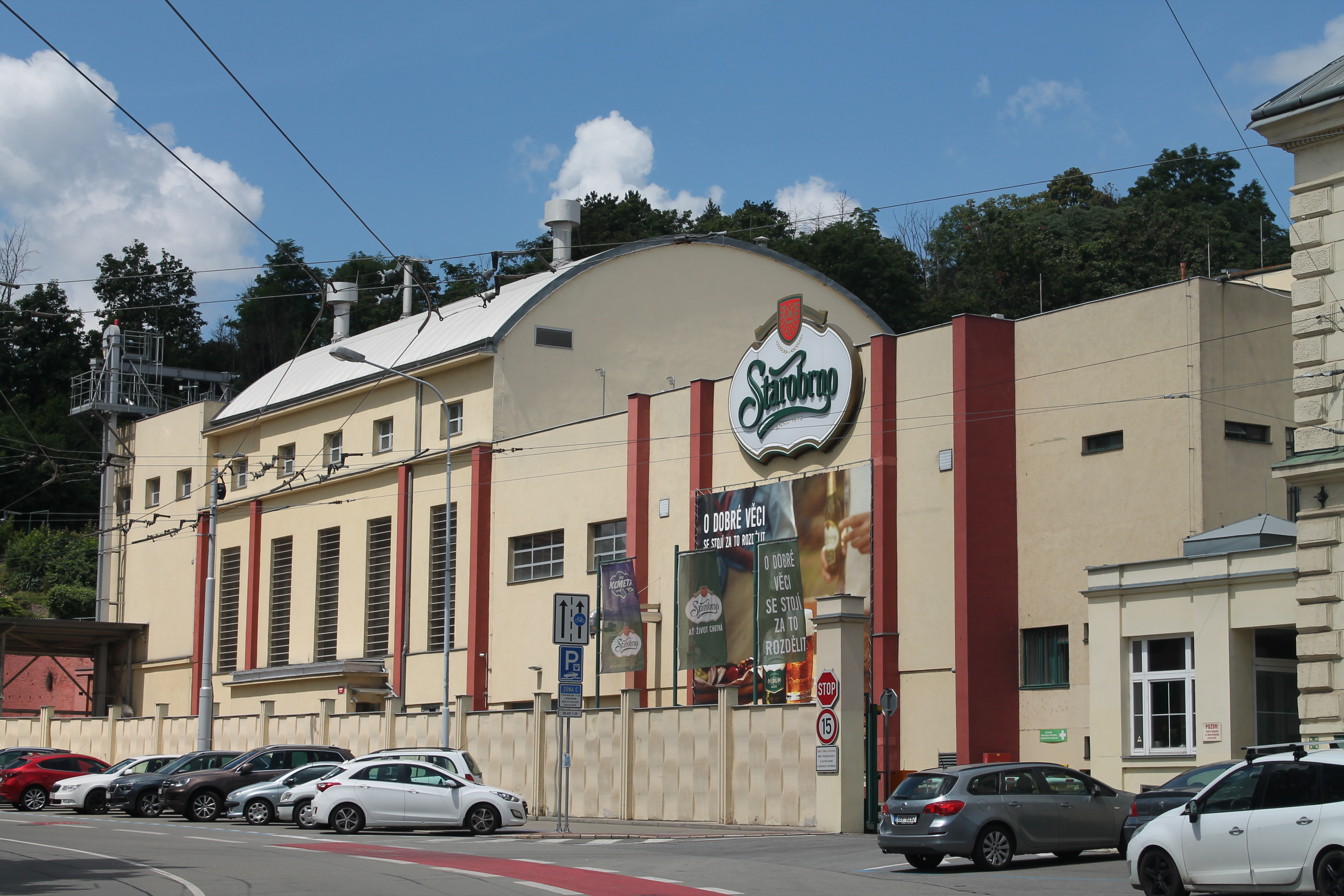
- Interactive map of Starobrno Brewery
- Location: Brno, Czech Republic
- Coordinates: 49°11′27.83″N 16°35′30.29″E
- Opened: 1325
- Owned by: Heineken N.V.
- Website: www.starobrno.cz

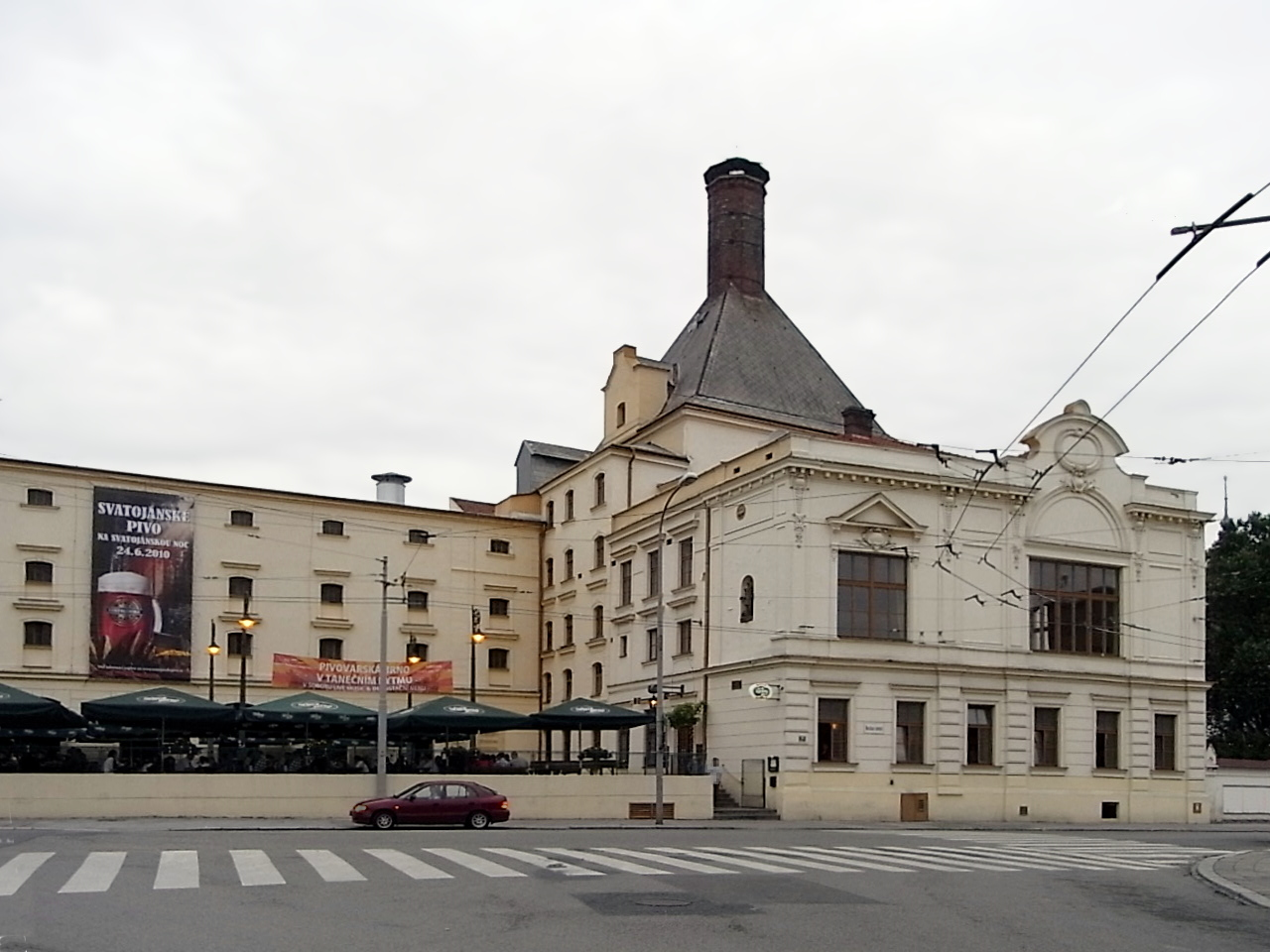
Starobrno Brewery, Brno City

Starobrno Brewery (in Czech: Pivovar Starobrno) is a Czech brewery located in the city of Brno. It was built as a successor of the brewery founded in 1325, as a part of Cistercian convent. The brewery was named Starobrno Brewery only in the second half of the 19th century. In 2009, Starobrno Brewery produced more than one million hectoliters of beer. The same year, the brewery merged with the Royal Brewery of Krušovice and became a part of the Dutch brewing company Heineken N.V.

== History ==
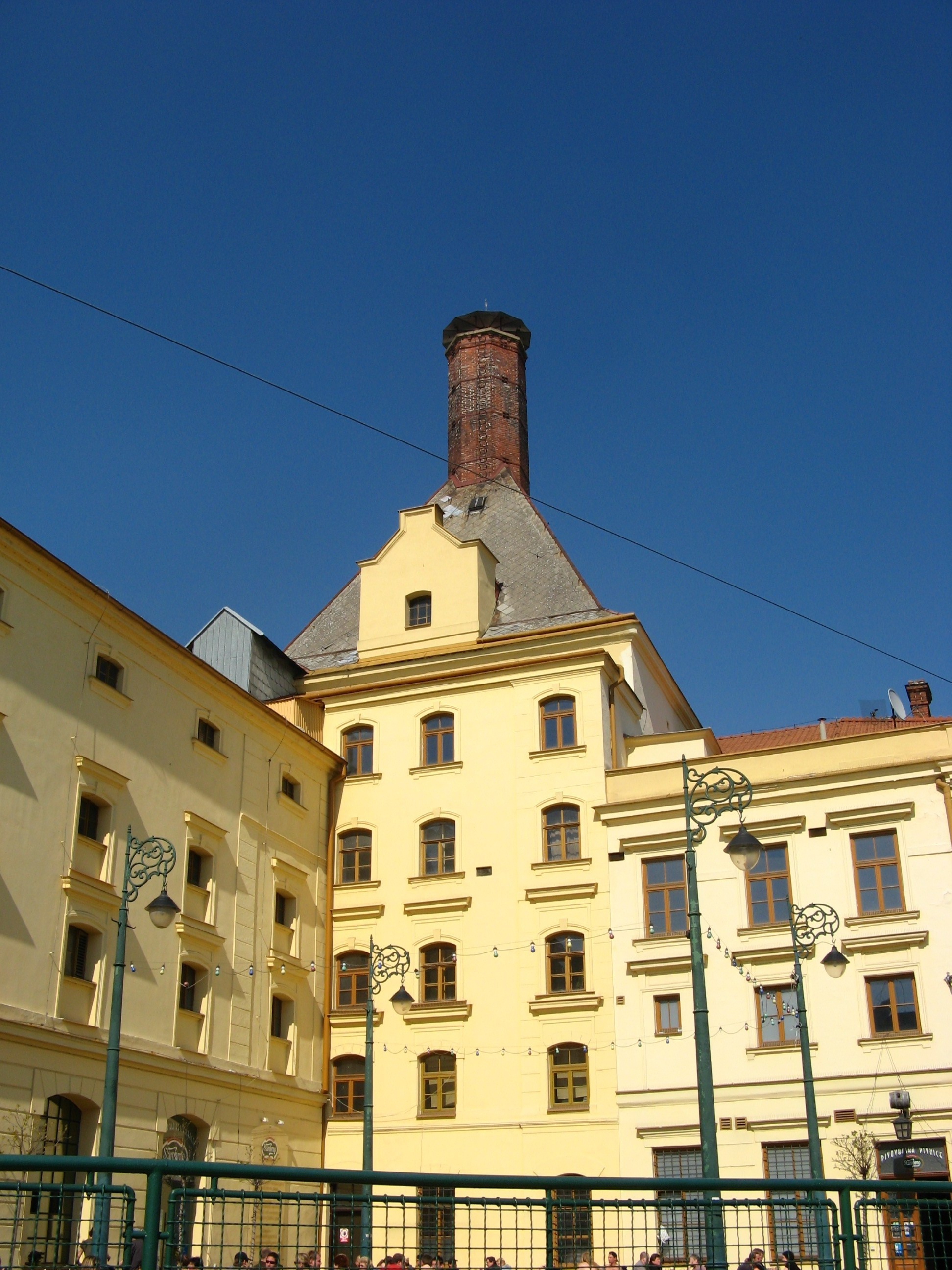
Starobrno Brewery, Brno City

The brewery's beginnings were connected with the Cistercian convent, built by Elisabeth Richeza of Poland, and located in the Old Brno district. The brewery was initially independent from the city council; it was managed by a burgher named Mořic. However, the city councilors strictly controlled the beer's quality.

During the Hussite Wars in the first half of the 15th century, the brewery and convent buildings were burned down several times, but were always restored in something like their old form. Following the Battle of White Mountain, in 1624, the city of Brno was forced to pay a special charge per beer, called "pivní tác". After the successful defense of the city against Swedish sieges in 1645, Brno was allowed to levy the charge for its own purposes.

In 1782, the convent was closed by the decision of the emperor Joseph II, and the property passed to the hands of St Thomas's Abbey. There is no evidence of the existence of the brewery between 1782 and 1825, as the archives were destroyed.

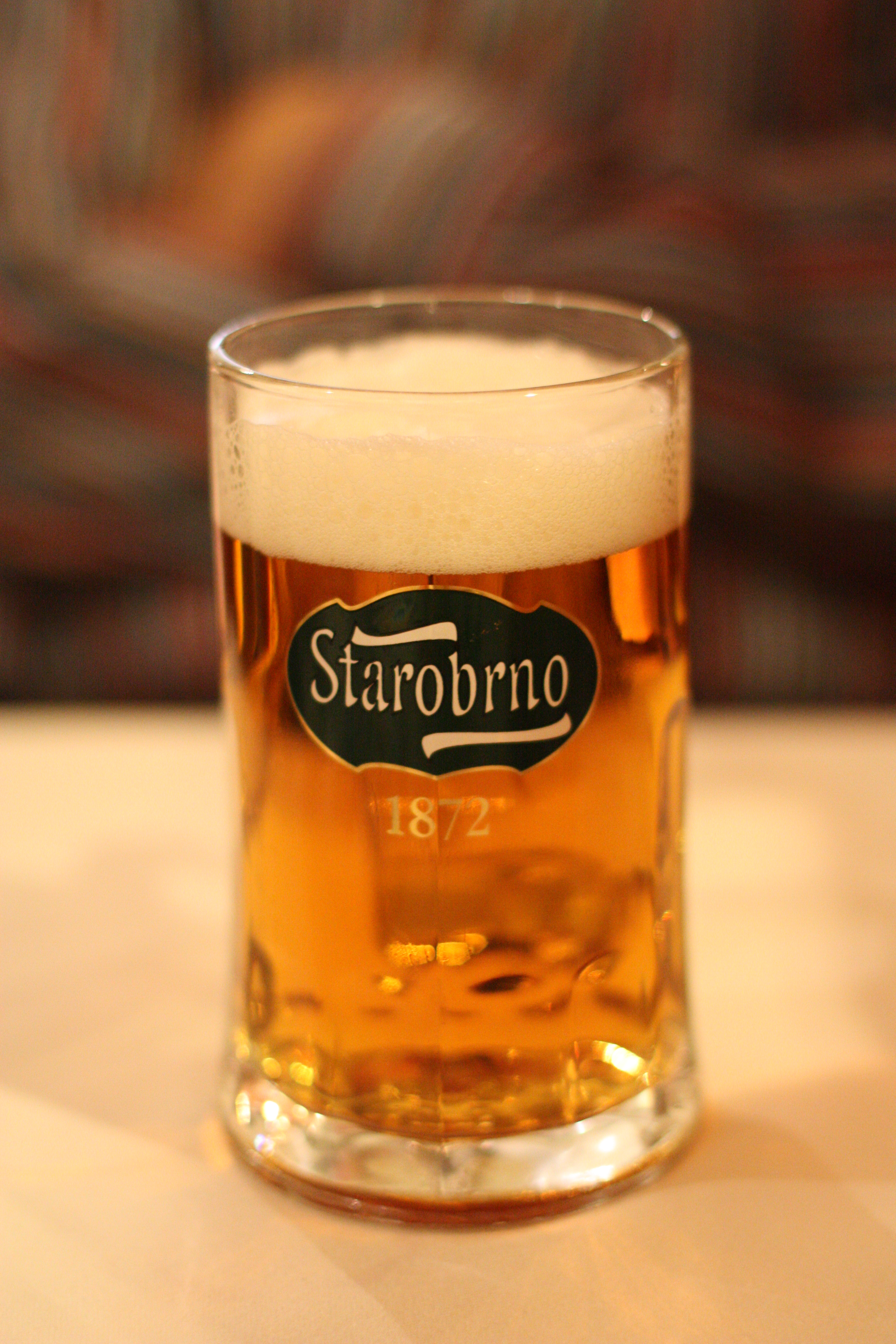
Half-litre of Starobrno

The second half of the 19th century in the Czech lands was marked by the expansion of the brewing industry. The outdated equipment and the low capacity of the Old Brno brewery were insufficient for the increasing demands of the rapidly growing city. The last owners of the original brewery, Josef Mandel and his son-in-law Herrmann Hayek therefore decided to build new, representative and modern brewing buildings. In 1872, the company "Mandel a Hayek" began construction of a new brewery on "V hlinkách" street. The buildings of the former brewery were used to construct a new malt house. In the last decade of the 19th century, the brewery merged with another brewing company, located in Brněnské Ivanovice. The production was moved to the new capacities in Old Brno. At the end of the 19th century, the annual production of the consolidated brewery was 236,490 hectoliters.

Up to the beginning of World War I, the company managed to overtake a major part of the competitors on the market in Brno, and production grew to 250,000 hectoliters yearly. The beer from Brno was exported to Poland and Austria-Hungary; the brewery supplied Vienna market with five wagons of beer daily. The owners of the company in that time were Germans; the first Czech shareholders came to the brewery only in 1911.

In 1918, after the establishment of the new Czechoslovak State, the brewery passed into the hands of Moravian Bank. The import of the beer-focused more on the Slovak market. The business activities of the company reached their highest level around 1927, however, the subsequent Great Depression caused a short decline for the brewery. The final result of the weak years was positive, Starobrno Brewery managed to beat its main rival on the market, Moravia Brewery.

During the World War II, the company was led by Germans. The brewery suffered damages during the bombing of Brno in November 1944, and was subsequently heavily damaged by passing front.

Throughout the second half of the 20th century, the brewery has been modernized on several occasions. Its modern history dates from 1992, when the structure of the brewery changed to a joint-stock company. The same year, it was awarded first prize in the beer exhibition PIVEX. In 1994, Starobrno became a part of the Austrian concern BBAG (Österreichische BrauBeteiligungs AG). The merger between BBAG and Heineken Group in 2003 allowed for the establishment of the most important brewing company in Middle Europe.

== Production ==
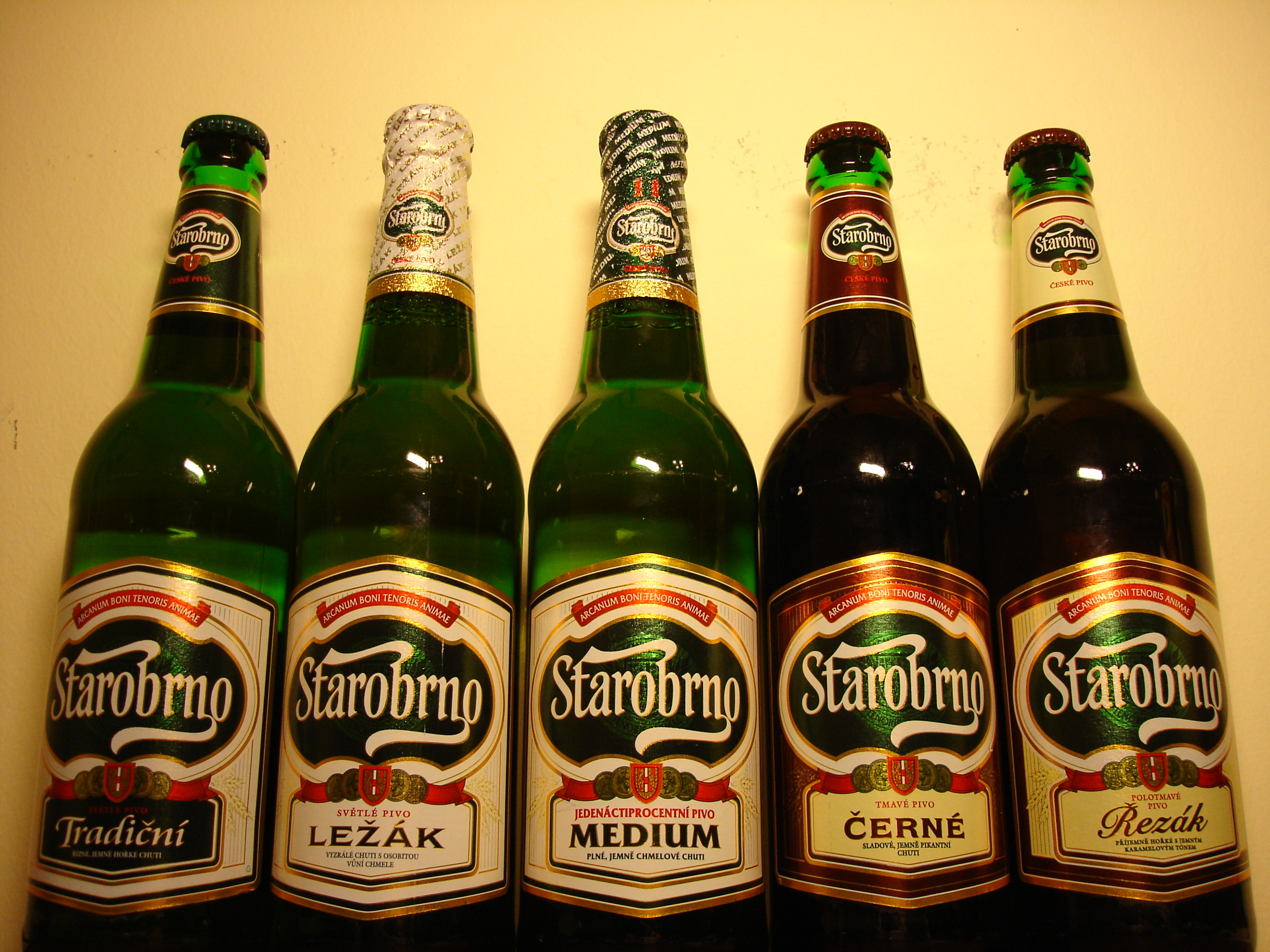
A selection of Starobrno bottles

In 2009, Starobrno Brewery produced more than one million hectoliters of beer, for the first time in its history.

Starobrno produces these different brands of beer in regular production, all beers are unpasteurised:

- Staré Brno – a pale 10° draught beer with 4.0% ABV (in Czech:Výčepní).
- Starobrno Medium – a pale 11° lager with 4.7% ABV (in Czech:Ležák).
- Starobrno Drak – a pale 12° lager with 5.3% ABV (in Czech:Ležák).
- Starobrno Unfiltered – an unfiltered 12° lager with 5.0% ABV (in Czech:Nefiltrovaný).

Aside from its standard production, the brewery produces a special batch of green beer, which is produced only once per year and distributed on Maundy Thursday. The Czech term for this Christian holiday is "Green Thursday" ("zelený čtvrtek") and the unusual color of the beer is inspired by this feast.

=== Craft series ===
On 18 March 2020 Starobrno brewery presented three new kinds of beer, inspired by craft beer styles:

- Indian Pale Lager – IPL – a pale lager with 5% ABV
- American Pale Ale – APA – a top-fermented beer with 5% ABV
- RED – a cherry-flavoured beer with 3.6% ABV.

== See also ==
- Beer in the Czech Republic

== Literature ==
- Verhoef, Berry (2004). Kompletní encyklopedie piva (in Czech). Dobřejovice: Rebo Productions. p. 234. ISBN 80-7234-116-2.
