= National Beer Day (United States) =

Unofficial holiday on April 7

- Observed by: United States
- Type: Unofficial
- Significance: Celebrates the passage of the Cullen–Harrison Act legalizing the sale of some beer
- Date: April 7
- Frequency: Annual

National Beer Day is celebrated in the United States every year on April 7, marking the day that the Cullen–Harrison Act came into force after having been signed into law by President Franklin D. Roosevelt on March 22, 1933. April 6, the day before, is known as New Beer's Eve. The 18th Amendment was later repealed by the ratification of the 21st Amendment on December 5 that year, officially ending Prohibition.

== Background ==
Prohibition in the United States on the national level revolved around the 18th Amendment to the Constitution, which generally banned "intoxicating liquors" but did not define the term, with some members of Congress assuming that the amendment pertained to liquor and not beer and wine. Then head of the Anti-Saloon League, Wayne Wheeler, drafted an enforcement act which was sponsored by Andrew Volstead; the National Prohibition Act, which came to be known as the Volstead Act, defined intoxicating liquors as any containing more than 0.5% alcohol and made it illegal to produce, transport or sell above said percentage. Additionally, while the 18th Amendment provided that "Congress and the several states" would have the power to enforce the Prohibition through legislation with a seven-year time limit to pass said legislation, the Volstead Act removed that flexibility.

In 1932, the Democratic Party adopted a platform of repealing the 18th Amendment and the modification of the Volstead Act to allow the production of beer. The Republican Party did not support repealing the amendment, though it did support the modification of it to allow states to legislate the issue individually. With the victory of Franklin D. Roosevelt in the 1932 presidential election, nine states voted to repeal the Prohibition, with two others supporting a referendum for a national repeal. There was an attempt to fully repeal the 18th Amendment that year, though on December 5 it failed to pass, falling six votes short of a two-thirds majority.

A committee was formed on December 7 to consider another bill, with representative James Collier drafting a bill which would legalize beer with an alcohol content less than 2.75% and the taxation of such beverages. Beer producers lobbied to increase the content to 3.2%, promising that they could create 300,000 jobs and provide $400 million in taxes over the next year. The lobbying succeeded, with the bill being reported on December 15 and passed in the House of Representatives on December 22. It was referred to the Senate Judiciary and Finance Committees the following day. In February 1933, both the House and the Senate approved the 21st Amendment, and on March 22 that year the Cullen–Harrison Act was passed and signed into law by Roosevelt. Upon signing the law, Roosevelt reportedly remarked "I think this would be a good time for a beer." The law took effect on April 7, 1933.

The Abner-Drury Brewery sent a guarded truck to the White House at a minute past midnight with two cases of beer for Roosevelt, though when it arrived, it became apparent he was asleep. The Marine guarding the beer opened the first bottle and drank it, allowing the press to photograph him. Roosevelt later sent the cases of beer to the National Press Club. People across the country gathered outside breweries on April 7, some of whom camped outside the night prior. An estimated 1.5 million barrels of beer were consumed, with an estimated $5 million of beer being sold in Chicago alone. Hundreds of breweries, bars, and taverns could reopen and expand again, hiring workers and buying new equipment, while restaurants could sell alcohol again. In the four months that followed, manufacturing grew by 78%, automobile and heavy equipment sales by almost 200%, the stock market by 71%, and approximately four million people found employment, with approximately 500,000 more jobs being created in related industries. Prohibition officially ended on December 5, 1933 with the passage of the 21st Amendment.

== Recognition ==
National Beer Day started as a conversation between Justin Smith of Richmond, Virginia, and his friend, Mike Connolly, when on March 1, 2009, they were passed by a man who said "happy beer day" to them, a term used to celebrate the repealing of Prohibition in Iceland on March 1. Though he initially believed it to be a "horrible idea", after some convincing by Connolly, Smith researched the history and came upon the passing of the Cullen–Harrison Act. He later started a Facebook group for the day. In 2011, beer-drinking app Untappd created a badge for National Beer Day that rewarded participants that checked a beer into the app on April 7. National Beer Day has been celebrated on social media every April 7 using the hashtag #NationalBeerDay.

National Beer Day was officially recognized by Virginia Governor Terry McAuliffe in March, 2017, and was recognised in the Congressional Record by Congressman Dave Brat on April 6 that year. In 2018, the Virginia General Assembly passed a joint resolution recognizing National Beer Day in the Commonwealth of Virginia. On National Beer Day in 2021, Samuel Adams announced a promotion that would commence on April 12 that year, stating that the first 10,000 people to share proof that they had received the COVID-19 vaccination on social media by May 15 would receive a free Samuel Adams beer.

== See also ==
- List of food days
- Beer Day (Iceland)
- Beer Day Britain
- Green Beer Day
- International Beer Day
- International Women's Collaboration Brew Day
