= Egils Appelsín =

Icelandic soft drink

Appelsín
- Type: soft drink
- Manufacturer: Egill Skallagrímsson Brewery
- Country of origin: Iceland
- Introduced: 1955; 70 years ago
- Color: orange
- Ingredients: Carbonated water, sugar, flavor, acid and dyes
- Variants: Malt og Appelsín

Appelsín is a fizzy orange-flavored soft drink, manufactured by Egill Skallagrímsson Brewery in Iceland since 1955. The products are accompanied by the slogan ‚hið eina sanna‘, meaning 'the one and only‘. During Christmas time, it is traditionally mixed with Malt (Maltextrakt), called Jólaöl (Christmas ale), also available pre-mixed. To prevent the foam from overflowing, the Appelsín can be poured before the Malt.
