= Smoking in Iceland =

Enforcement of smoking bans is strong in Iceland.

Smoking in Iceland is banned in restaurants, cafés, bars and night clubs as of June 2007. A large majority of Icelanders approve of the ban. At the time the ban went into effect, almost one in four Icelandic people were smokers.

Iceland has the third highest proportion of people who never smoke at 81%, when compared to other European countries.

== History ==
In 1971, Iceland became the first country to ban tobacco advertising in the mass media, movie theaters, and outdoors. In addition, the country required that 0.2% of tobacco sales were diverted towards tobacco control.

In 1977, all remaining tobacco promotion was banned.

In 1984, the first full-length Tobacco Control Act passed making warning labels on packages mandatory, sales to those under 16-years of age banned, and smoking in certain public locations prohibited. In 1985, Iceland became the first country to implement tobacco packaging warning messages with pictograms (Canada introduced pictures in 2001).

Changes to this Tobacco Control Act includes provisions on help for quitting and more smoking bans in public locations.

In 2001, all mass coverage of tobacco products was banned and it is required that these products are not visible at the point of sale.

== Bans and policies ==
To legally buy cigarettes in Iceland one needs to be at least 18 years of age. In addition, cigarettes are not allowed to be sold in vending machines and instead are most likely to be found in convenience stores and gas stations.

Smoking is heavily restricted in restaurants, nightclubs, bars, and other public places. Smoking in taxis, buses, healthcare facilities, educational facilities, and private worksites is banned.

Tobacco companies are required to have a health warning or message on their packaging what describes the harmful effects of tobacco use. These warnings must not be obscured in any way and must include a photo or graphic. The law requires that 30% of the front and 35% of the rear of tobacco packages must be covered in health warnings. As of January 2013, 14 new warnings must be regularly rotated.

According to the Regulation No. 790 of 2011 on Picture and Text Warnings on Tobacco, article 3, these 14 warnings include:

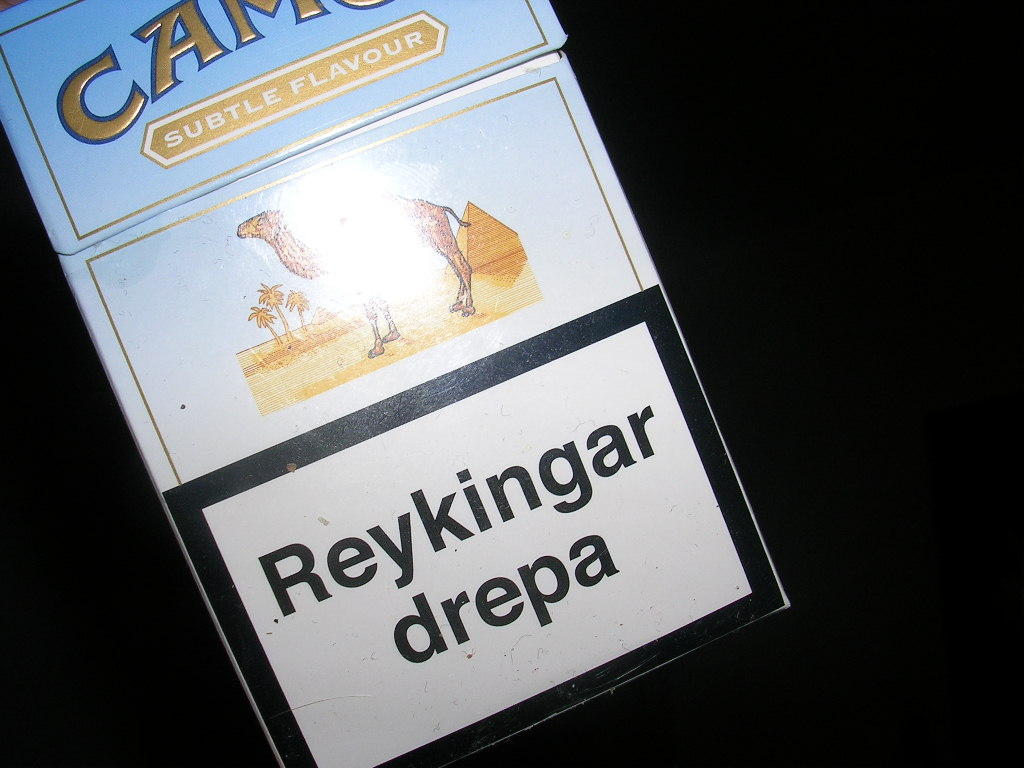
An example of a cigarette packaging warning label in Iceland

1. Those who smoke die before their time.
2. Smoking clogs the arteries and causes heart attacks and strokes.
3. Smoking causes terminal lung cancer.
4. Smoking while pregnant harms your child.
5. Protect children – do not let them inhale smoke.
6. Your doctor or pharmacist can help you quit smoking.
7. Smoking is highly addictive, do not start smoking.
8. If you quit smoking your risk of terminal heart and lung disease decreases. Smoking can cause a slow and painful death.
9. Smoking can cause a slow and painful death.
10. Get help with quitting: Tel. 800 6030.
11. Smoking can inhibit circulation and cause impotence.
12. Smoking speeds up ageing of the skin.
13. Smoking can harm sperm and reduce fertility.
14. Tobacco smoke contains benzene, nitrosamine, formaldehyde and cyanide.

These packages are also required to contain one of the following warnings:

1. Smoking kills.
2. Smoking is very harmful to you and those who are close to you.

Tobacco companies are banned from advertising in certain locations to certain audiences, these direct bans include: national TV and radio, local magazines and newspapers, billboard and outdoor ads, and ads on the Internet. Other indirect bans include: free distribution, promotional discounts, and product placement or appearance in TV and films. Sponsored advertising of events as well as sponsorship or promotion for certain audiences is banned as well.

Tobacco products sold in Iceland cannot contain more than 10 mg of tar, 1 mg of nicotine, and 10 mg of carbon monoxide per cigarette.

== Trends ==
In Iceland there isn't much of a difference between gender in respect to smoking rates: according to the WHO, 15% of adult women are reported to take part, while similarly 15.3% of adult men admit to smoking regularly.

Those with higher income are reportedly less likely to smoke.

== Legislation ==
Tobacco in Iceland is regulated mainly under the Tobacco Control Act of 2002, with the most recent amendment being in 2013. These laws cover the environments in which smoking is allowed or prohibited, tobacco advertising, promotion, sponsorship, and packaging and labeling.

In a nation-wide effort to lower the amount of teen drug and tobacco use, Icelandic governments not only restricted the age to purchase cigarettes in their country, but imposed a curfew and introduced classes in music, dance, and martial arts to their youth. This effort was made in an attempt to offer teens a "natural high alternative" to drug use. Between 1998 and 2016 the percentage of 15 to 16-year-olds smoking daily fell from 23% to only 3%.

== E-cigarettes ==
According to a study done by Iceland's Directorate of Health, around 10,700 Icelanders use e-cigarettes daily. This number equals approximately 5% of the total population, and is greatest among individuals younger than 35 years of age.

== Avenues for tobacco control ==
The last reported amount in 2008 states that government expenditures on tobacco control equal approximately 70,000,000 ISK, or US$562,610.87.

Toll-free telephone helplines are available for help and information on quitting throughout the country. Nicotine replacement therapy treatments are available for legal purchase without a prescription, and are not covered by federal or national health insurance. Other treatments such as naltrexone/bupropion and Varenicline are also sold legally; however, a prescription is required and the cost is not covered by federal or national health insurance.

== See also ==
- State Alcohol and Tobacco Company of Iceland
