= Green beer =

Beer dyed green for a festive occasion

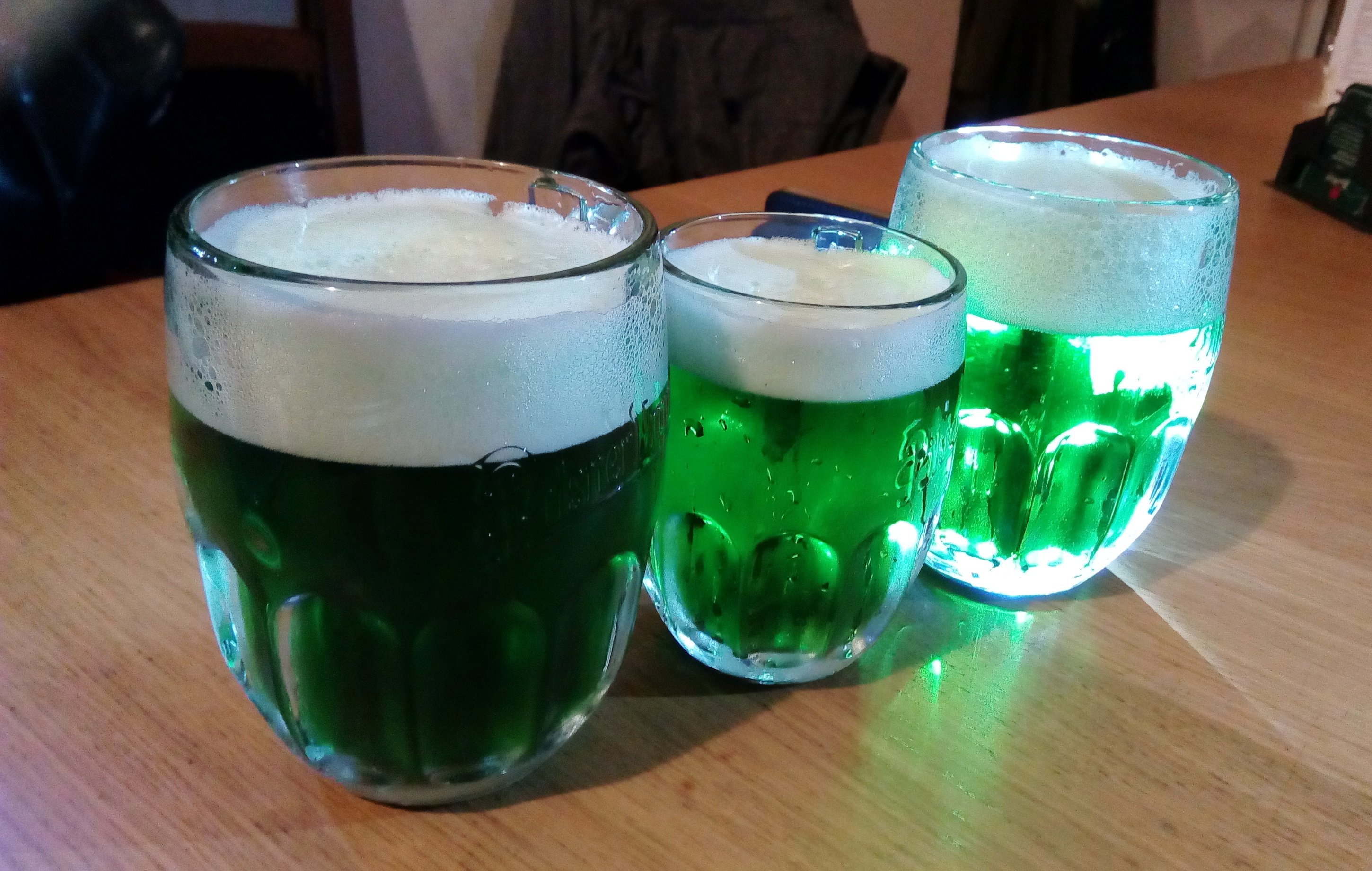
- Green beer on tap on Maundy Thursday in České Budějovice
- Type: beer
- Alcohol by volume: variable
- Colour: green

Green beer is beer that has been festively dyed green for occasions such as Saint Patrick's Day in the United States or Maundy Thursday in the Czech Republic.

== Production ==
The beer is typically green food dye added to beer. A recipe from the 1910s uses wash blue to color the beer. Typically, light beers are used, as dark beers, even ambers, are too dark. Even though much of the green beer sold for St. Patrick's Day in the United States are Molson Coors brands, the company does not produce green beer. It is typically made at the distributor level by adding it to kegs.

Starobrno Brewery in the Czech Republic makes their color with a combination of herbs, a special malt, and a green liquor (blue curaçao), the latter including the dye brilliant blue FCF. The brewery's parent company Heineken brands was fined 50,000Kč for not disclosing the artificial dye. Another dye commonly found in the Czech versions is tartrazine, typically in combination with brilliant blue FCF, but in at least one case (Valášek) with indigo carmine. Similarly to Starobrno, Ground Breaker Brewing in Portland, Oregon also uses blue curaçao to make a green beer, although they also add edible glitter.

Inspired by practices in Myanmar and Thailand, the American brewery Dogfish Head Brewery made a green beer colored with spirulina in 2006. However, one of the most prominent spirulina beers from Southeast Asia is not green. Freetail Brewing in San Antonio also experimented with a green spirulina beer, as did Hokkaido's Abashiri Beer. In Spain and Italy, a green beer colored with olives was released.

== St. Patrick's Day ==
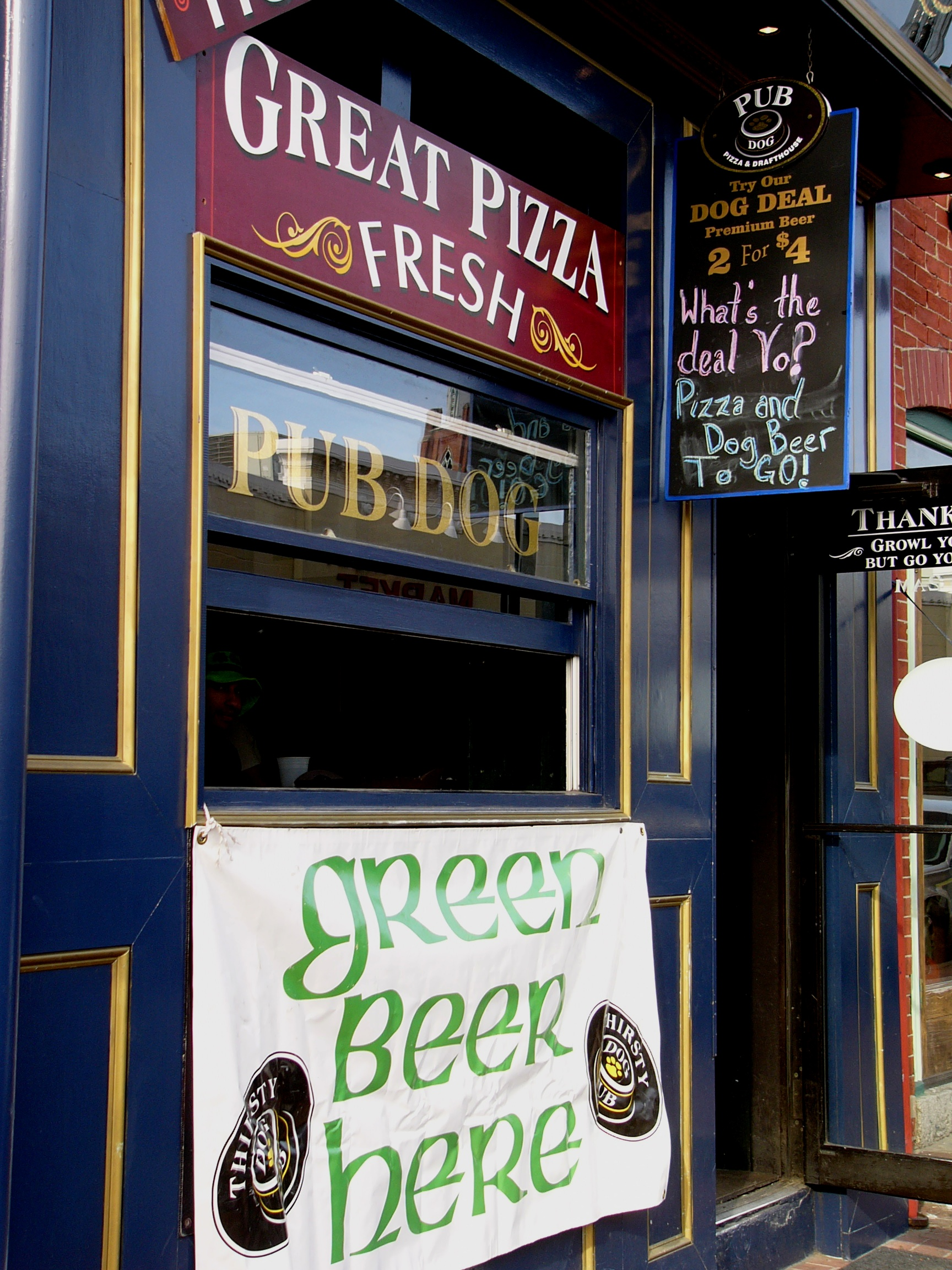
A pub in Baltimore advertising green beer for St. Patrick's Day

Many sources point the origins for the St. Patrick's Day libation to the United States, and not Ireland. The drink is not traditional in Ireland though the trend has been imported to a small degree since the 1980s. One story says it originates with Green Beer Day at a pub in the Tipperary Hill neighborhood of Syracuse, New York, in 1962 or 1963 to kick off the St. Patrick's festivities. An earlier story points to its "discovery" to Thomas H. Curtin in New York City prior to 1914. It was also served in 1910 in Spokane, Washington.

== Maundy Thursday ==
In the Czech Republic, three days before Easter is "Green Thursday", when green vegetables can be washed down with green beer (zelené pivo). The color association with the day comes from the German name of this day, Gründonnerstag, which also translates to "Green Thursday", but the origin of the German term is uncertain. It possibly stems from a custom of green sprigs of herbs being worn by penitents, or it has been speculated that local Catholic priests in the past would wear green vestments for the Holy (Maundy) Thursday mass. There is, however, no record of it, as the official liturgical color for the Holy Thursday mass is invariably white. Drinking green beer for the holiday began in 2005 at Starobrno Brewery in Brno. By 2009, the brewery was making 250,000 liters of green beer and distributing country-wide. The idea was popular and spread and other breweries also began producing their own versions. Purkmistr brewery in Plzeň even released a version for St. Patrick's Day.

== Green Beer Day ==
The drink is the focus of Green Beer Day at Miami University in Ohio, originally stemming from its consumption on St. Patrick's Day when spring break was moved to conflict with the holiday.
