= Prohibition in Iceland =

Prohibition of alcohol (1915–1989)

Prohibition in Iceland went into effect in 1915 and lasted, to some extent, until 1 March 1989 (since celebrated as "Beer Day"). The ban had originally prohibited all alcohol, but from 1922 legalized wine and in 1935 legalized all alcoholic beverages except beer with more than 2.25% alcohol content. As in many other states with prohibition, "illegal brewing and smuggling of alcoholic beverages were widespread during the ban."

According to one study, "Opposition to beer in Iceland was found to be strongest among Alþingi members from rural areas and traditional socialist parties. The most influential argument against beer alone was that adolescents are particularly susceptible to the temptation to drink beer. Opponents of the beer ban in Alþingi pointed out the peculiar nature of the law allowing hard liquor but prohibiting the weaker beverage. More liberal alcohol policies have increased the total amount of alcohol consumed in Iceland in recent years."

== History ==
In a 1908 referendum, Icelanders voted in favour of a ban on all alcoholic drinks, going into effect 1 January 1915. In 1921, the ban was partially lifted after Spain refused to buy Iceland's main export, fish, unless Iceland bought Spanish wines. The ban was then modified after a national referendum in 1933 came out in favour of legalising spirits. Strong beer (with an alcohol content of more than 2.25%), however, was not included in the 1935 vote in order to please the temperance lobby—which argued that beer would lead to more depravity, because it was cheaper than spirits.

As international travel brought Icelanders back in touch with beer, bills to legalise it were regularly moved in the Icelandic parliament, but were shot down on technical grounds. Prohibition lost more support in 1985, when the Minister of Justice and Ecclesiastical Affairs (himself a teetotaler) prohibited pubs from adding legal spirits to legal non-alcoholic beer (called "pilsner" by Icelanders) to make a potent imitation of strong beer. Soon after, beer approached legalisation in parliament—a full turnout of the upper house of Iceland's parliament voted 13 to 8 to permit the sales, ending prohibition in the country.

== Beer Day ==
Following the end of prohibition, some Icelanders have celebrated Beer Day on 1 March. Some people may take part in a "rúntur" (bar crawl), with a few bars staying open until 4:00 a.m. the next day. The legalisation of beer remains a significant cultural event in Iceland as beer has become the most popular alcoholic beverage.

== See also ==
- Prohibition of alcohol
- Beer Day (Iceland)
- Brennivín
- Beer in Iceland
- Vínbúð
