= Green Beer Day =

Traditional party at Miami University in Oxford, USA

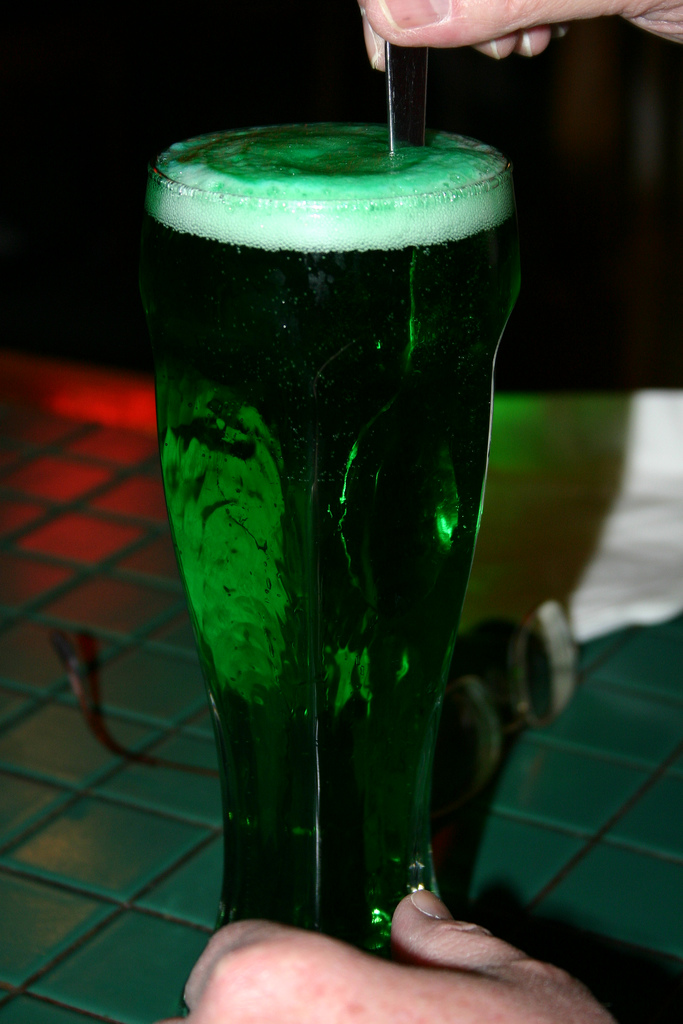
Green beer is created by mixing in another ingredient.

Green Beer Day (GBD) is an unofficial day-long party near the Miami University campus, where celebrants drink green beer dyed with artificial coloring or natural processes. The tradition was started by bar owners in Oxford, Ohio, and is celebrated annually on the Thursday before Miami University's spring break. Green Beer Day started in the early 1980s after a change in Miami University's academic calendar caused St. Patrick's Day to fall during spring break when students were gone. Local bar owners tried various names for their new day of drinking (including "Wild Irish Fun" in 1981) before settling on the name "Green Beer Day" in 1982. Claims that Green Beer Day began in 1952 are therefore incorrect. Green beer was consumed in Oxford on St. Patrick's Day (March 17) prior to the university calendar change just as it was all over the country. Green Beer Day has been called Miami University's "biggest tradition" although it is not sanctioned by the university.

== Tradition ==
Students begin to drink at 12 A.M. on Green Beer Day; bars in Oxford open at 5 A.M. Many students embark on their first successful entrepreneurial venture on Green Beer Day, selling iconic green shirts to drink in throughout the day. The rise in popularity of this annual celebration has given rise to many pop up apparel companies that sell Green Beer Day apparel in the weeks leading up to the event.

== University and City of Oxford response ==
Miami University actively tries to fight Green Beer Day's binge drinking culture and encourages instructors to remove students who arrive to class inebriated on the day. While Miami students recognize Green Beer Day, Miami threatened legal action against the owner of the domain www.greenbeerday.com for using the Miami name without permission. Miami changed its timing of its Spring Break in 2009, allowing students to celebrate both Green Beer Day and St. Patrick's Day; when asked if the change was intended to allow Miami students to celebrate twice, Steve Snyder, the executive assistant to the president of the university, responded, "Miami University has nothing whatsoever to do with Green Beer Day." In 2017, Ohio State Highway Patrol and four other police agencies conducted OVI stops and the Oxford Police Department plainclothes operations to stop underage drinkers.

After the death of a student in 2017 from alcohol-related issues, Miami University president Gregory Crawford met with community leaders to combat binge drinking culture in preparation for Green Beer Day. Oxford liquor license holders agreed to open fewer bars early in the morning, and fraternities agreed to avoid serving hard liquor at parties. Before Green Beer Day, Miami's student government launched a campaign called "Life is Priceless" encouraging students to call 911 and highlighting Miami's Good Samaritan policy.

Students have criticized the university for refusing to recognize one of its biggest traditions, and the Miami Student editorial board has criticized the university for trying to destroy it as a yearly event. Miami alumni have begun to celebrate the event in other cities, with an especially large event occurring annually in Chicago, Illinois.

== See also ==
- List of food days
- Beer Day (Iceland)
- Beer Day Britain
- International Beer Day
- International Women's Collaboration Brew Day
- National Beer Day (United States)
