= International Beer Day =

- Type: Cultural
- Date: First Friday in August
- 2024 date: August 2
- 2025 date: August 1
- 2026 date: August 7
- 2027 date: August 6
- Frequency: Annual

International Beer Day is a celebration on the first Friday of every August founded in 2007 in Santa Cruz, California by Jesse Avshalomov. Since its inception, International Beer Day has grown from a small localized event in the western United States into a worldwide celebration spanning 207 cities, 80 countries and 6 continents. Specifically, International Beer Day has three declared purposes:

1. To gather with friends and enjoy the taste of beer.
2. To celebrate those responsible for brewing and serving beer.
3. To unite the world under the banner of beer, by celebrating the beers of all nations together on a single day.

== Celebration ==
Participants are encouraged to give one another the 'gift of beer' by buying each other drinks, and to express gratitude to brewers, bartenders, and other beer technicians. In the international spirit of the holiday, it is also suggested that participants step out of their domestic/locally brewed comfort zone and sample a beer from another culture.

== Popularity ==
Popular forms of International Beer Day Events include: Tapping of new or rare beers, all-day happy hours, beer flights, trivia nights, binge drinking and other games (such as beer pong), beer/food pairings and beer gear giveaways.

== Date change ==
From 2007 through 2012, International Beer Day was celebrated on August 5. After International Beer Day 2012, the founders took a poll of fans and chose to move the holiday to the first Friday in August.

== See also ==
- List of food days
- Beer Day (Iceland)
- Beer Day Britain
- Green Beer Day
- International Women's Collaboration Brew Day
- National Beer Day (United States)
