= Hugh Boyd Secondary School =

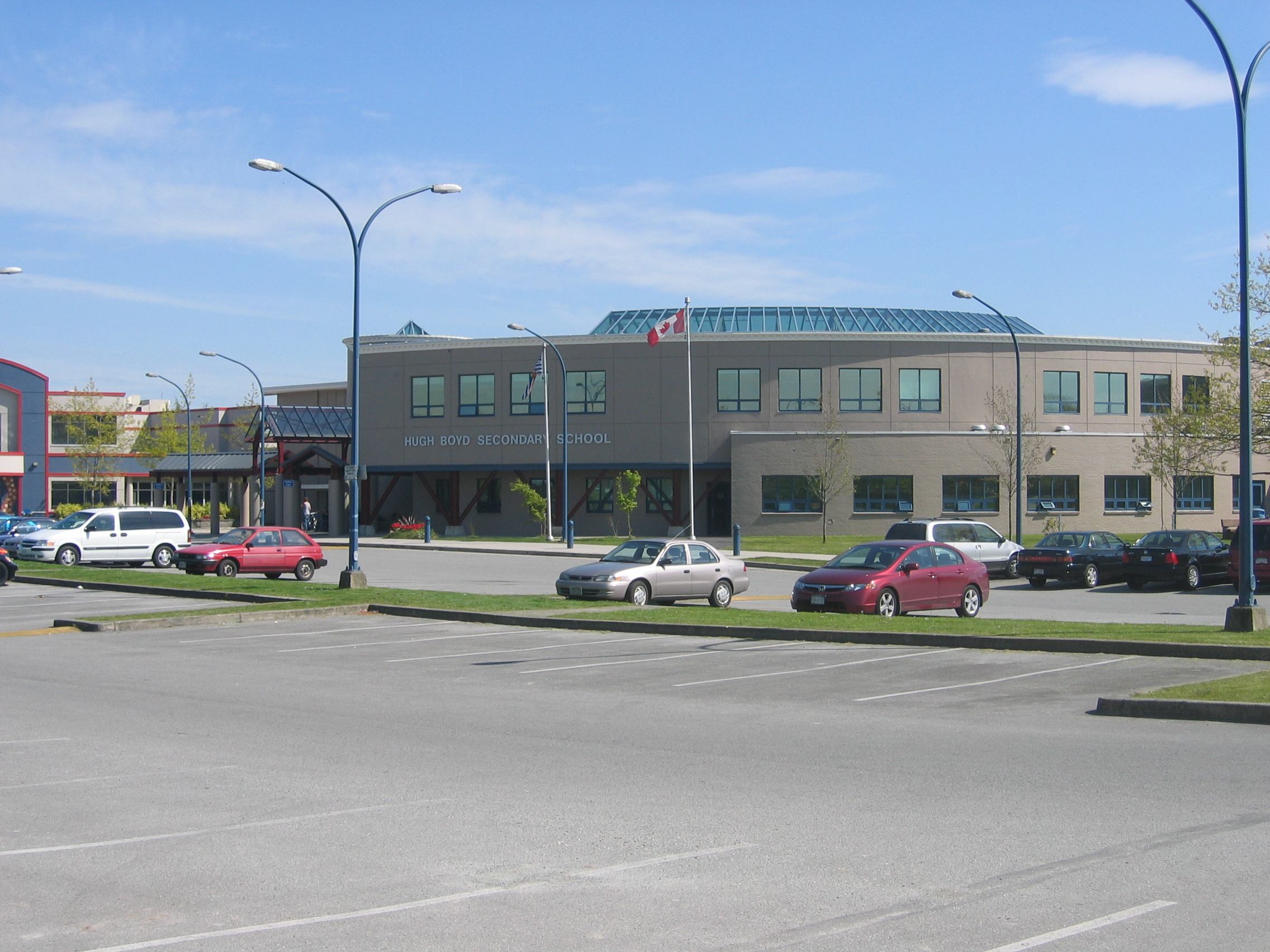
- Photograph of Hugh Boyd taken from the north side of the school's parking lot

Location
- 9200 No. 1 Rd. Richmond, British Columbia, V7E 6L5; Canada; 49.14574°N 123.17871°W

Information
- Other names: HBS, HBSS, Hugh Boyd, Boyd
- School type: Public, secondary school
- Founded: 1960
- School district: School District 38 Richmond
- Superintendent: Christopher Usih
- Area trustee: Ken Hamaguchi
- School number: 03838031
- Acting Principal: Rosalind Poon
- Vice Principal: Ian Felgar
- Acting Vice Principal: Dikaia Vakakis
- Staff: 78
- Teaching staff: 46
- Grades: 8–12
- Years offered: 5
- Age range: 12–18
- Enrollment: 709 (2024-2025)
- Language: English
- Colours: Black; Gold
- Athletics: Basketball, Volleyball, Soccer, Ultimate, Track and Field, Golf, Cross Country
- Mascot: None (formerly Tommy Trojan)
- Team name: Hugh Boyd Hawks
- Feeder schools: Gilmore Elementary School, Dixon Elementary School, Steves Elementary School, Diefenbaker Elementary School, Quilchena Elementary School, and Grauer Elementary School.
- Website: boyd.sd38.bc.ca

Hugh Boyd Secondary School (HBS or HBSS), commonly known as Hugh Boyd or Boyd, is a public, co-educational secondary school part of School District 38 Richmond (SD38), serving and educating 599 (2022–2023) students from grades 8 to 12. Formerly, Hugh Boyd Secondary was the only school in Richmond that formerly the International Baccalaureate Middle Years Programme before it was discontinued in 2025. The school is located on the western side of Richmond, British Columbia, Canada, at 9200 No. 1 Road, stretching as far north to Francis Road and as far south to Pendleton Road. Hugh Boyd consists of the main school building, along with 3 parking lots (2 located at the front and back of the school along with 1 located far north on Francis Road), 2 soccer fields (Boyd Oval and Boyd South) and an artificial turf field with 4 sections (white, yellow, red, blue). Boyd also has 2 small extra buildings to the northwest with them being its Scout Hall and the Boyd Oval Field House. To the east, the school is conjoined with the West Richmond Community Centre with the West Richmond Pitch & Putt Golf Course being located just further east. Hugh Boyd Secondary was named after Hugh Boyd, the first reeve of the Township of Richmond (now the City of Richmond).

Hugh Boyd Secondary opened in 1960 originally as a junior secondary school serving only Grades 8–10 before it expanded in 1996 switching into a junior-senior secondary school serving students Grades 8–12. As of September 2020, the school had completed its needed near-CAD$11m seismic upgrades; replacing the school's previous tech wing with an addition of a new tech wing, library and other minor upgrades towards the building.

Its student population ranges each year, from approximately 500 to 800 students, most of whom come from the surrounding Seafair neighbourhood. Hugh Boyd's school catchment area, as of 2022, consists of the 7 elementary schools of Alfred B. Dixon, James Gilmore, John G. Diefenbaker, Lord Byng, Manoah Steves, Quilchena, and R.M. Grauer.

Hugh Boyd's school colours are black and gold, and the school's sports team name are the Hugh Boyd Hawks (commonly known as Hawks). Hugh Boyd offers sports programs such as Basketball, Volleyball, Soccer, Ultimate (Co-ed), Track & Field, Golf, and Cross-country Running.

== Transportation ==
Common ways of transportation to Hugh Boyd included are by walking, biking, driving, or using public transportation, specifically using bus route 401 One Road/Richmond-Brighouse Station which has bus stops covering most areas within Hugh Boyd's catchment area. Bus stops nearby Hugh Boyd for bus route 401 include NB No. 1 Road @ Osmond Avenue and SB No. 1 Road @ Osmond Avenue. Other ways of transportations include using a school bus from the school district.

Approximate time taken travelling to Hugh Boyd (front entrance) using different methods of transportations (quickest route)
Starting Point	Walking	Biking	Driving	Bus
Dixon Elementary	9 min	3 min	3 min	(Walking)
Gilmore Elementary	17 min	5 min	4 min	13 min
Diefenbaker Elementary	20 min	7 min	5 min	(Walking)
Lord Byng Elementary	27 min	10 min	3 min	9 min
Steves Elementary	18 min	5 min	3 min	15 min
Quilchena Elementary	26 min	8 min	4 min	12 min
Grauer Elementary	23 min	7 min	3 min	13 min
McMath Secondary	28 min	8 min	4 min	13 min
Burnett Secondary	38 min	13 min	5 min	>20 min
Richmond-Brighouse Station	1 hr 13 min	23 min	9 min	>16 min

== Notable programs ==
Hugh Boyd features a Combined Studies Program (shared with Matthew McNair Secondary), the school's very own Performing Arts program, a Learning Centre and Resource Program, and an Incentive Program (INC) for Science, Individuals and Societies, and Language and Literature (Grades 8–10). As of September 1, 2011, the school's candidacy for the International Baccalaureate Middle Years Programme (MYP) had been accepted and was recognized as an International Baccalaureate (IB) candidate school for the MYP. In the year 2013, Hugh Boyd officially became an IB World school with the MYP having applied to the school's Grade 8 to 10 students.

=== Incentive ===
"The Incentive Program challenges motivated students in Grades 8–10 to achieve academic and personal excellence. It is designed to meet the needs of high ability students with potential leadership qualities. Students in each grade will study English, Social Studies, and Science in an environment designed to challenge them. There will be opportunities for cooperative learning, independent study, and out of school field trip experiences. Students must be independent thinkers and risk- takers in their approach to learning and possess critical thinking and creative problem-solving skills."

=== Combined Studies ===
"The Boyd Combined Studies Program is an alternative academic program designed to meet the learning needs of students in Grade 11 and 12 who have not achieved success in the regular classroom. Students must be capable of writing all required provincial exams and complete learning outcomes in a smaller class grouping."

=== Learning Centre and Resource ===
"Boyd also hosts an all-encompassing Learning Centre and Resource Program, with a substantive team of resource teachers and EAs who support students with diverse abilities."

=== Performing Arts ===
"Boyd’s Performing Arts Program offers a wide range of courses in theatre and music including Theatre, Drumming, Jazz and Concert Band, and continues to win competitions and produce professional quality Theatre productions. These programs are complemented by a Visual Arts Program offering courses in Photography, Drawing and Painting, Ceramics and Sculpture and Advanced Placement Studio Arts."

=== IB Middle Years Programme (MYP) ===
Previously, Hugh Boyd Secondary School offered the International Baccalaureate Middle Years Program, before it was discontinued on June 30, 2025, with the 2024/2025 school year being the last year of the program. The quote below is an excerpt from the Hugh Boyd website prior to the program's end.

"The Hugh Boyd Middle Years Program, is an International Baccalaureate program that all of our Grade 8–10 students are enrolled in. Students are all educated using the IB Learner Profile tenets which has been “designed to develop internationally-minded people who, recognizing their common humanity and shared guardianship of the planet, help to create a better and more peaceful world". Learners in this program strive to be: Inquirers, Knowledgeable, Thinkers, Communicators, Principled, Open-Minded, Caring, Risk-Takers, Balanced and Reflective."

In a memo from April 25, 2025, Superintendent Christopher Usih of SD38 cited increasing similarities of teaching and learning approaches between the MYP program and the standard BC Curriculum. Usih also stated that many of the core MYP elements are now a part of the BC Curriculum. After reviewing the program and collecting input from various members of the school community from January 2024 to January 2025, the district made a decision not to continue with the MYP program.

== Learning, courses, and graduation ==
Hugh Boyd's core curricular areas include Mathematics, Sciences, Language arts, Social studies, Physical education (P.E.), and Career Life Education (C.L.E.). Passing the courses of the core curricular area, completing the Graduation Literacy and Numeracy assessments, along with obtaining 80 credits from courses from Grade 10–12 are needed for graduation and post-secondary learning. Courses offered in Boyd usually split up into more specific aspects of the existing course the higher grade a student is (i.e. Mathematics, Grade 8–9 → Foundations/Pre-Calculus, 10 → Foundations, 11–12 OR Pre-Calculus, 11–12).

Obtaining MYP requirements such as passing all core curricular areas, language acquisition, arts/design courses, the MYP Interdisciplinary Unit through Grade 8 to 10, having a minimum of 10 service/volunteer hours per grade (Grade 8–10), and passing the MYP Grade 10 Personal Project awards students with the IB MYP Certificate. The certificate may be used to support applications towards university and post-secondary learning.

Courses of Hugh Boyd (as of 2022, including in-class, out of class, online and MYP learning courses)
Course	Grade 8	Grade 9	Grade 10	Grade 11	Grade 12
Mathematics	Mathematics	Mathematics	Foundations of Math & Pre-Calculus, Workplace Mathematics	Foundations of Mathematics, Pre-Calculus, Workplace Mathematics	AP Calculus, Foundations of Mathematics, Pre-Calculus
Science	Science, Science (INC)	Science, Science (INC)	Science, Science (INC)	Bio-Psychology, Chemistry, Life Sciences (fmr. Biology), Physics, Science for Citizens	Anatomy and Physiology (fmr. Biology), Chemistry, Life Sciences (fmr. Biology), Physics, Bio-Psychology
Individuals and Societies	Individuals and Societies, Individuals and Societies (INC)	Individuals and Societies, Individuals and Societies (INC)	Individuals and Societies, Individuals and Societies (INC)	20th Century World History Asian studies, British Columbia First Peoples, Geography, Law Studies , Social Justice	20th Century World History, Asian Studies, BC First Peoples, Geography, Law Studies, Social Justice
Language and Literature	Language and Literature, Language and Literature (INC)	Language and Literature, Language and Literature (INC)	Composition and New Media, Literacy and Creative Writing, Literacy and Creative Writing (INC)	Creative Writing, Literary Studies, New Media	AP English Language and CompositionAP English, Creative Writing, English studies
Physical and Health Education	Physical and Health Education	Fitness and Conditioning, Physical and Health Education	Fitness and Conditioning, Physical and Health Education	Active living, Fitness and Conditioning, Physical and Health Education	Active Living, Fitness and Conditioning, Physical and Health Education
Language Acquisition	French, Japanese, Spanish	French, Japanese, Spanish	French, Japanese, Spanish	French, Japanese, Spanish	French, Japanese, Spanish
Technology education	Technology Education	Engineering, Metalwork, Woodwork L1, Woodwork L2	Engineering, Metalwork, Woodwork L1, Woodwork L2	Engineering, Metalwork, Woodwork L1, Woodwork L2	Engineering, Metalwork, Woodwork L1, Woodwork L2
Home economics	Home Economics, Textiles	Fashion and Design, Food studies	Fashion and Design, Food Studies	Baking and Pastry, Fashion and Design, Food Studies	Baking and Pastry, Fashion and Design, Food Studies
Music	Band, Drumming	Choir, Concert band, Drumming, Jazz band	Choir, Concert Band, Drumming, Jazz Band	Choir, Composition and Production, Concert Band, Drumming, Jazz Band	Choir, Composition and Production, Concert Band, Drumming, Jazz Band
Fine arts	Art	Ceramics & Sculpture, Studio Art, Photography, Yearbook	Ceramics & Sculpture, Studio Art, Studio Art (Enriched MYP) Photography, Yearbook	Art Careers, Ceramics & Sculpture, Studio Art, Photography, Yearbook	AP Arts, Art Careers, Ceramics & Sculpture, Studio Art, Photography, Yearbook
Performing Arts	Drama	Drama	Drama, Theatre Company, Theatre Production	Directing & Script development, Drama, Performance Acting, Theatre Company, Theatre, Production	Directing & Script Development, Drama, Performance Acting, Theatre Company, Theatre, Production
Design and Information Technology	N/A	Design and Drafting, Design and Drafting (CAD), Web development	Design and Drafting, Design and Drafting (CAD), Web Development	Design and Drafting, Design and Drafting (CAD), Computer programming	Design and Drafting, Computer Programming
Business education	N/A	N/A	N/A	Accounting, Entrepreneurship, Marketing and Promotion	Accounting, Entrepreneurship, Marketing and Promotion
Leadership	N/A	N/A	N/A	Leadership	Leadership
Career Life Education	Career Education	Career Education	Career Life Education	N/A	Career Life Connections & Capstone Project
Middle Years Programme (MYP)	Interdisciplinary Unit – Grade 8	Interdisciplinary Unit – Grade 9	Personal Project, Interdisciplinary Unit – Grade 10	N/A	N/A
Richmond Virtual (RVS)	N/A	N/A	N/A	Digital media, Videography and Photography Production	Digital Media, Peer tutoring, Rec and Service, Videography and Photography Production

== History ==
1960 – Hugh Boyd Secondary School is founded and opens to serve students Grade 8 to 10

1994 – All junior secondary schools in Richmond's School District 38 were converted to junior-senior secondary schools including Hugh Boyd

September 1, 2011 – School's candidacy for the IB MYP accepted

2013 – Hugh Boyd becomes an IB World school for the MYP

June/December 2018 – After 80 years of combined volunteer work, Haddow brothers, Bill and Bruce were set to leave the Trojans' football program

September 2020 – Hugh Boyd's seismic upgrade finished providing a new technology wing for the school. Hugh Boyd also transitions to the Quarter from Linear system due to COVID-19

February 2021 – SD38's 'principal shuffle' affects 7 elementary schools and 5 secondary schools including Boyd

September 2021 – Hugh Boyd transitions from the Quarter to Semester system permanently along with all other schools in SD38 (excl. A.R. MacNeill, Richmond secondary schools)

September 2022 – Hugh Boyd re-establishes Block Rotation (ABCD to BADC) which occurs every Wednesday, Thursday and every other week on Friday. PLT is also re-established (Personal Learning Time) into its schedule occurring every Tuesday and Thursday starting at 8:30–9:25 am

June 2023 – The Trojan moniker of Hugh Boyd sets to change to provide a more neutral, appropriate name.

== Notable alumni ==
- Nicki Clyne, actress
- Nicolas Macrozonaris, athlete
