= Beer Day (Iceland) =

Icelandic holiday

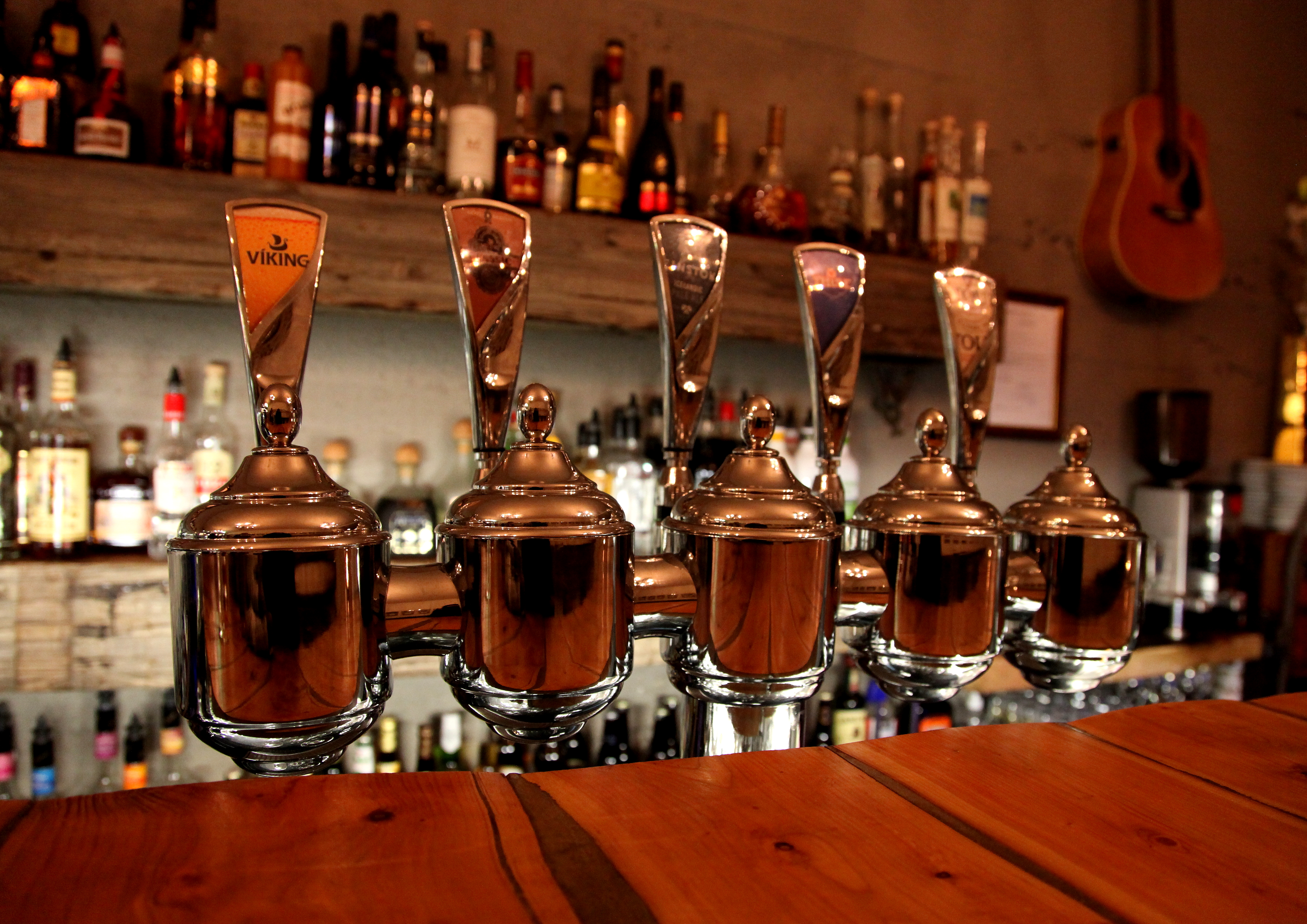

In Iceland, Beer Day (Icelandic: Bjórdagurinn) is celebrated every year on March 1, honoring the elimination of the 74-year prohibition of beer. Prohibition lasted from January 1, 1915 to March 1, 1989.

== Origin ==
In a 1908 referendum, Icelanders voted in favor of a ban on all alcoholic drinks, going into effect January 1, 1915. In 1921, the ban was partially lifted after Spain refused to buy Iceland's main export, fish, unless Iceland bought Spanish wines; then lifted further after a national referendum in 1935 came out in favor of legalizing spirits. Strong beer (with an alcohol content of 2.25% or more) was not included in the 1935 vote in order to please the temperance lobby—which argued that because beer is cheaper than spirits, it would lead to more depravity.

As international travel brought Icelanders back in touch with beer, bills to legalize it were regularly moved in parliament, but inevitably were shot down on technical grounds. Prohibition lost more support in 1985, when the Minister of Justice (himself a teetotaler) prohibited pubs from adding legal spirits to legal non-alcoholic beer (called "pilsner" by Icelanders) to make a potent imitation of strong beer. Soon after, beer approached legalization in parliament—a full turnout of the upper house of Iceland's Parliament voted 13 to 8 to permit the sale, ending prohibition in the country.

== Celebration ==
The first Beer Day, Ölstofan bar owner Kormákur Geirharðsson recalls:

I remember a lot of drinking and a lot of pissing all night long and the next days, and it [was] not stopping. This was the day Icelanders took the step to try to become civilized. Ölstofan was not open then, but the idea of owning a bar started there.

— The Reykjavik Grapevine,

In what many feel is not a coincidence, the 1990 birthrate in Iceland, one year after the introduction of legalized beer, was the highest in 10 years and has never been topped since then..Following the end of prohibition, Icelanders have celebrated every Beer Day by imbibing the drink in various bars, restaurants, and clubs. Those located in Reykjavík, the capital and largest city in Iceland, are especially wild on Beer Day.; A Rúntur (pub crawl) is a popular way of getting to know the various bars and beers in this city, many being open until 4:00 a.m. the next day. The legalization of beer remains a cultural milestone in Iceland, and a major seismic shift in the nation’s alcoholic beverage preference. Beer has today become the most popular alcoholic beverage of choice.

The celebration of Beer Day in Iceland has inspired a similar event in the U.S., known as Iceland Beer Day, or IBD.

== See also ==
- Beer in Iceland
- Prohibition in Iceland
- List of food days
- Beer Day Britain
- Green Beer Day
- International Beer Day
- International Women's Collaboration Brew Day
- National Beer Day (United States)
