= Sara Barton =

British brewer (born 1965)

- Born: 1965 (age 60–61); Grantham, Lincolnshire, United Kingdom
- Occupation: Brewer
- Awards: Brewer of the Year – British Guild of Beer Writers; 2012; Brewer of the Year – Institute of Brewing and Distilling; 2019

Sara Barton (born 1965) owns Brewster's Brewery in Grantham, Lincolnshire. In 2012, Barton was the first woman awarded the British Guild of Beer Writers’ Brewer of the Year Award and was the 2019 Institute of Brewing and Distilling Brewer of the Year. Her beers have won multiple international awards. She started Project Venus, a collaborative brewing group for women brewers, in 2011.

== Personal life ==
Barton was born in Grantham Hospital in 1965 and raised in Redmile, where her parents ran a guesthouse; her father also worked for her grandfather's business, Barton Transport in Nottingham. She attended Belvoir High and King Edward VII school in Melton.

While a Biochemistry student at University College North Wales, Barton took a class on yeast genetics and became interested in brewing. Barton went on to earn her master's degree in Brewing and Distilling from Heriot-Watt University, Edinburgh in 1987. She briefly worked in the pharmaceutical and sugars syrup industries before settling into work as a brewer.

Barton is married to Sean McCardle and they have a daughter who was born in 2005.

== Brewing career ==
Barton worked for Courage Brewery’s production facilities in Bristol, Reading, and Tadcaster; she then spent several years working as a Production Manager at their Berkshire brewery, the largest brewery in Europe at the time. After several years, she left Courage Brewery and enrolled in an MBA program at Bradford School of Management.

She decided to open her own brewery, and named it Brewster’s, which is the old term for female brewer; Brewster's began serving beer in 1998. The first brew was called “Maiden Brew" and the original brewing facility was in a barn behind her parents’ house. Barton also co-owns a pub, the Marquis of Granby in the Vale of Belvoir, which is run by her husband Sean McCardle.

== Women brewers ==
Barton started Project Venus in 2011; this organization female brewers from England and Ireland meet every three months to brew a new beer. Project Venus advances gender equity in the industries “By facilitating communication, education and collaborative brews, they aim to create an approachable networking space for all females involved in beer.” Project Venus was inspired by the Pink Boots Society. The British Guild of Beer Writers chairman Tim Hampson commented specifically on Barton's work when he said “By sharing her experience and skills generously with these emerging brewsters, she is encouraging more of them to start brewing and returning an industry that has been dominated by men back to its roots, when beers were made, like bread, by the woman of the house.” Barton has also been called “a trailblazer for women in the industry, agrees that imagination is what women bring to brewing and it is a big part of their increasing success." and said that "Men can be tied to the more traditional ways of doing things whereas we think outside the boring, brown, bitter box. We're not forever going down the hoppier, stronger route."

Her brewery has also made ales for International Women's Day in March.

== Awards ==
Barton was the first woman awarded the British Guild of Beer Writers’ Brewer of the Year Award in 2012. The award had already been given 20 times before it was awarded to Barton. She was also the 2019 Institute of Brewing and Distilling Brewer of the Year.

Her American Pale Ale won a Gold Medal at the International Beer Challenge in 2011, Helles won a Silver Prize at the 2012 National competition run by the Society of Independent Brewers, and Hophead won an International Brewing Awards Gold medal in 2015. She won a gold medal at the International Brewing Awards in 2016 and Brewer of the Year from the All Parliamentary Beer Group in 2018. Decadence is listed one of Roger Protz's "300 Beers to try before you die.”
