= 1933 Icelandic prohibition referendum =

21 October 1933

Results
Choice	Votes	%
Yes	15,866	57.71%
No	11,625	42.29%
Valid votes	27,491	97.61%
Invalid or blank votes	672	2.39%
Total votes	28,163	100.00%
Registered voters/turnout	62,122	45.33%

A referendum on the prohibition of alcohol was held in Iceland on 21 October 1933. Voters were asked whether to repeal the ban on importing alcohol imposed following a 1908 referendum being lifted. Its repeal was approved by 58% of voters.

== Results ==
Choice	Votes	%
For	15,866	57.71
Against	11,625	42.29
Total	27,491	100.00
Valid votes	27,491	97.61
Invalid/blank votes	672	2.39
Total votes	28,163	100.00
Registered voters/turnout	62,122	45.33
Source: Nohlen & Stöver

== See also ==
- Prohibition in Iceland
