= 1908 Icelandic prohibition referendum =

- 10 September 1908

Results
Choice	Votes	%
Yes	4,850	60.11%
No	3,218	39.89%
Valid votes	8,068	92.65%
Invalid or blank votes	640	7.35%
Total votes	8,708	100.00%
Registered voters/turnout	11,726	74.26%

A referendum on the prohibition of alcohol was held in Iceland on 10 September 1908, alongside parliamentary elections. In the first referendum to be held in the country, voters were asked whether they approved of a ban on importing alcohol. It was approved by 60.1% of voters but was overturned by a second referendum in 1933.

== Results ==
Choice	Votes	%
For	4,850	59.35
Against	3,218	40.65
Invalid/blank votes	640	–
Total	8,728	100
Registered voters/turnout	11,726	74.43
Source: Direct Democracy
