= Women in brewing =

History and modern sociology of women who brew alcohol

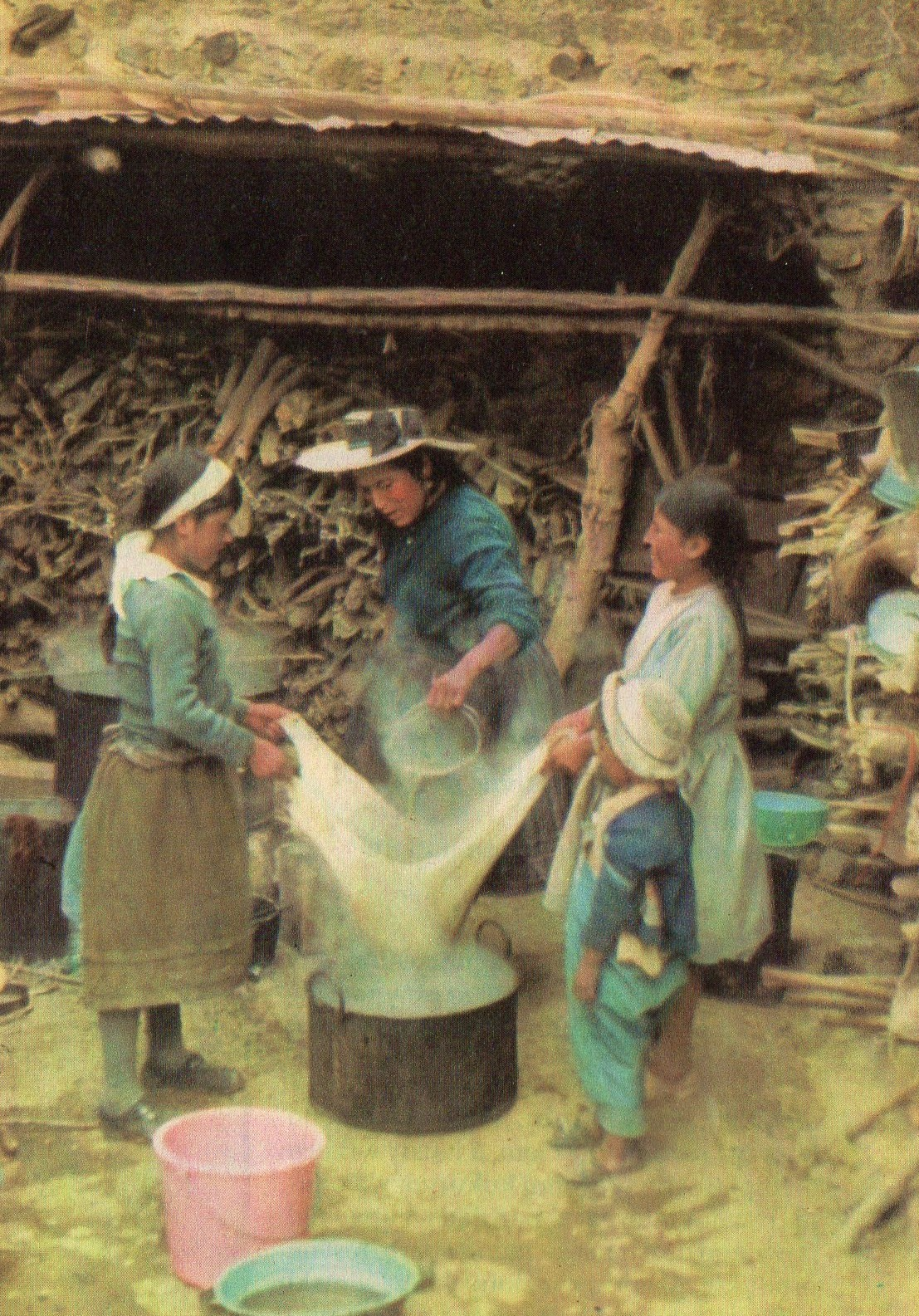
Women making chicha, in the Andean village of Huacho sin Pescado (1980)

Women have been active in brewing since ancient times. From the earliest evidence of brewing in 7000 BCE, until the commercialization of brewing during industrialization, women were the primary brewers on all inhabited continents. In many cultures, the deities, goddesses and protectors of brewers were female entities who were associated with fertility.

From the middle of the 18th century, women had roles as barmaids, pub operators, bottlers or secretaries for breweries. In less industrialized areas, they produced homebrews and traditional alcoholic beverages. From the mid-20th century, women began working as chemists for brewing establishments. Beginning in the 1960s and 1970s, they began re-entering the field as brewers.

== History ==
Ethnographic studies and archaeological records indicate that, until the industrialization of brewing began, brewing beer was primarily an activity engaged in by women. From the 18th century onwards, women were increasingly employed as barmaids, and particularly in Australia as "publicans" or licensees running hotels selling alcohol. By the 19th century, few women were employed in brewing with the exception of labor for auxiliary functions, such as bottling and secretarial posts. In the 20th century, women began to work in a limited capacity in laboratories, but aside from a few exceptions such as Susannah Oland in Canada, women were excluded from directing brewing operations. Professional female brewers in Western society before the trade became "masculinized", were referred to as "brewsters".

In Chinese legend, Yi Di, is credited with making the first alcohol from rice grains. In some accounts Yi Di is the wife of Yu the Great, sometimes a servant of Yu's daughter, sometimes a medical man who created liquor to cure "disorders". A female divine being in Ainu mythology known as Kamui Fuchi was the protector of brewing; brewers prayed to her and offered libations to ensure the warding off of evil spirits which might spoil the batch. Women in both Japan and Taiwan in the modern age engage in chewing rice to begin the fermentation process for making alcohol.

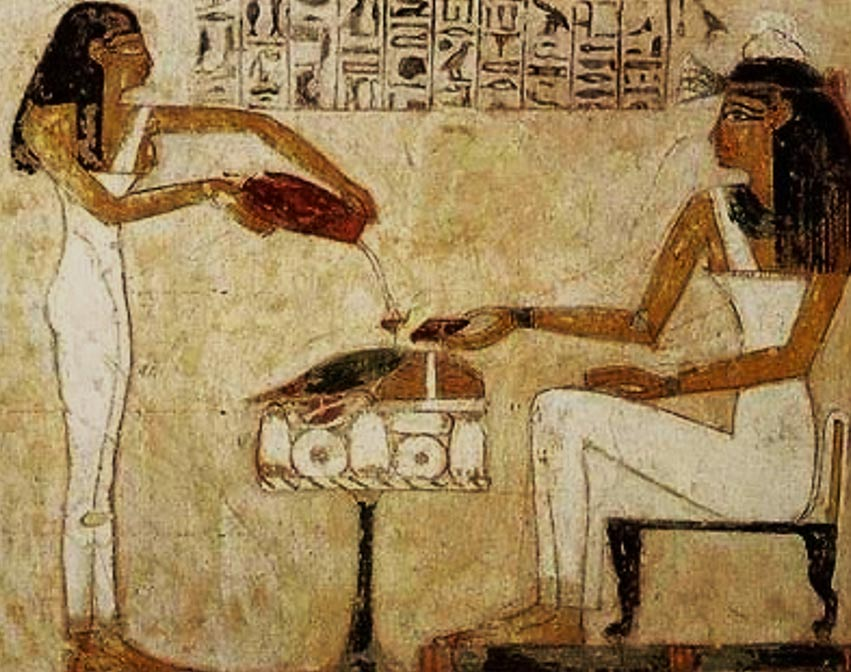
Egyptian hieroglyphics showing women pouring beer

In ancient Sumeria, brewing was the only profession that was "watched over by a female deity", namely Ninkasi. A tablet found dating back to 1800 BCE contains the Hymn to Ninkasi which is also basically a recipe for Mesopotamian beer. Sumerian beer was made from bappir, a bread made from twice-baked barley, which was then fermented. In ancient Babylon, women worked as baker-brewers and were often engaged in the commercial distribution of beer. Archaeologists believe that the Sumerians and Babylonians were responsible for spreading brewing processes into Africa. Brewing in ancient Egypt followed a method similar to Sumerian beer, often using the same dough as a base for both beer and bread. Brewing was considered the province of Egyptian women, "especially the steps of grinding the grain and straining the mash". The goddess Hathor was considered to have invented brewing and Hathor's temple at Dendera was known as "the place of drunkenness". Another Egyptian goddess, Tenenet, was worshiped as beer's deity and hieroglyphics on tombs depict images of women both brewing and drinking the beverage. Other African societies also credited women with creating beer. For example, the Zulu fertility goddess, Nomkhubulwane, is revered for her invention, as is the Dogon deity, Yasigi, who is often depicted dancing with a beer ladle to symbolize her role of distributing the beer made by women in ceremonial gatherings. Women in Burkina Faso have been making mash of fermented sorghum into beer for some 5,500 years. In Tanzania, both women and men help harvest and create different kinds of brew, including ulanzi and pombe. Women in Tanzania have traditionally been the "sole marketers" of drinks, and many use the money they make by selling alcohol to supplement their incomes.

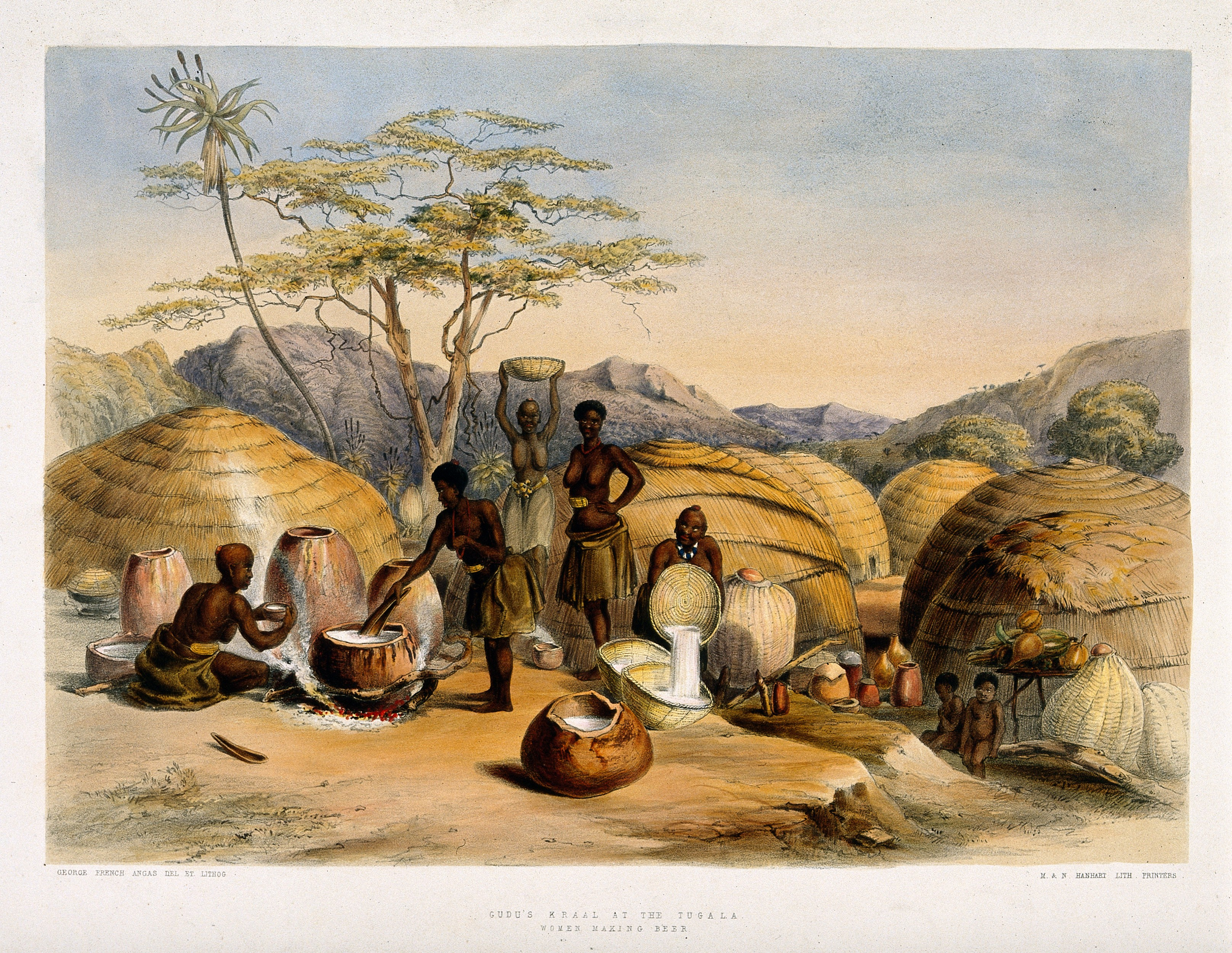
Native South African women brewing beer by their huts

As early as 1600 BCE, Maya civilizations were using cacao beans to produce beer, long before it was used to make the non-alcoholic cocoa. Though actual production methods are unknown, Friar Landa described the process of preparing beverages as involving grinding maize and cacao to a paste before adding liquids and spices. Agriculture was within man's realm in the Mayan world, but food preparation belonged to women. On an ancient ceramic vase, chocolate preparation shows a woman pouring the substance between two vessels to create the highly desired foam favored by the Maya. Pre-Columbian Andean women chewed maize (occasionally using cassava or quinoa) to break down the starch and then spit it out to begin fermentation. Chicha, the resulting drink, is still widely available in Latin America. In the Wari Empire, archaeological evidence has indicated that elite Wari women brewers ran the breweries and that tradition carried forward into Incan society. Throughout the Andean region and Mesoamerica, women were the chief producers of alcoholic beverages. During the 15th century in Peru, women's lives among the Xauxa people of the Upper Mantaro Valley were changed by the process of producing chicha. After the Xauxa were conquered by the Inca, women were forced to work harder to produce more alcohol. In Mexico, a female deity, "Mayahuel" was revered among the Aztec for having discovered how to extract agave sap for the manufacture of pulque. After the Spanish invasion, women in Brazil and Mexico, as well as throughout Andean territories, became not only producers of alcoholic beverages, but also its main market vendors.

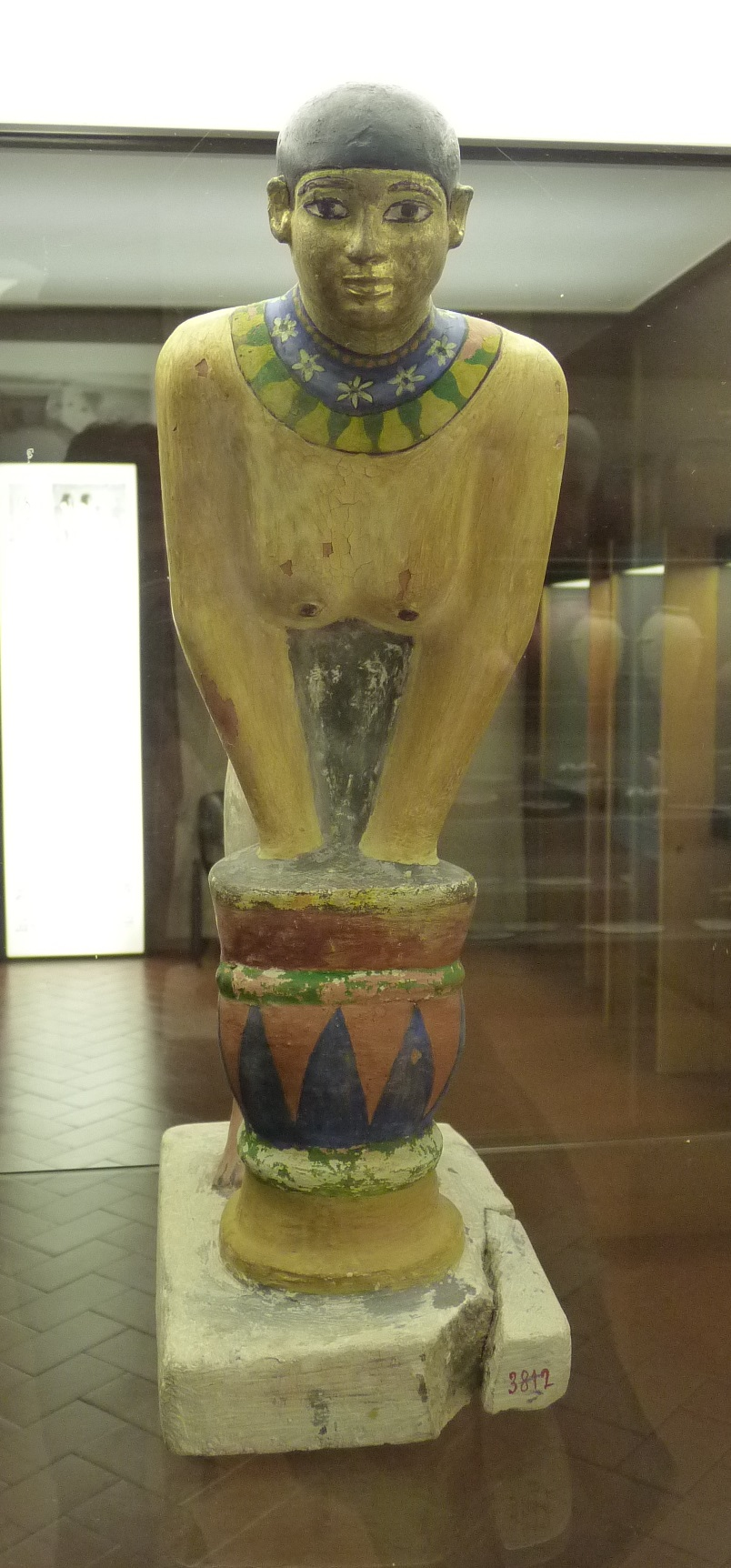
Brewing woman

Traditional Germanic societies were reported by the Romans to drink ale, made predominantly of fermented honey, produced by women. Until monasteries took over the production of alcoholic beverages in the 11th century, making it a profession for monks and nuns, brewing was the domain of tribal Germanic women. Migratory Germanic tribe women typically brewed their meads and ales in the forest, to avoid pillages by invaders. Their beverages did not contain hops, which were first recommended as an additive by St. Hildegard of Bingen. Because hops served as a preservative, beer's suitability for consumption became longer, though the addition of hops also increased the cost of brewing. In the decades before the Black Death in Europe, many households required a large amount of ale, because of a lack of potable water and expense of other beverages. Women used the opportunity of brewing to make extra money at home. In Brigstock, some women obtained licenses to brew over several months. Women in northern England were the main brewers for the community. As elsewhere in Europe, the founding of guilds often forced women out of the brewing industry; however, in Haarlem in the Netherlands, because women were allowed to inherit guild membership from spouses, many continued in the profession. Data collected on the period between 1518 and 1663, showed that 97 brewsters, three-quarters of whom were widows, were operating among a total of 536 brewers in the city.

For around a thousand years in Finland, women brewsters created a beer called sahti in villages throughout the country. The recipe usually contained hops, juniper twigs, and barley and rye grains which had been malted and then smoked in a sauna. Finnish legends include the story of Louhi in the Kalevala, a woman who brewed beer by mixing bear's saliva with honey. Raugutiene, was a Baltic and Slavic goddess, who was the protector of beer. Alan D. Eames, a beer anthropologist, wrote an article in 1993 stating that the Norse Vikings, allowed only women to brew their ale. Archaeologists have uncovered graves of pre-Viking Nordic people which indicate that women were the ones who made and served alcohol. In the grave of the "Egtved Girl", a bucket of grog buried at her feet showed that the drink was made from a mixture of wheat, rye and barley as a base and included cranberries, honey, and lingonberries, as well as herbs, including birch resin, bog myrtle, juniper, and yarrow, to spice the drink. Danish women were the primary brewers until the establishment of guilds in the Middle Ages. While guilds controlled production for the crown and military, as well as for those in cities, women continued to be the primary brewers in the countryside. Even within the guilds, while higher positions were occupied by men, many of their wives held lower positions; in addition, there is evidence to suggest that the majority of the brewing performed by these families was carried out by the wives. Beer was supplied to Temple Newsam, Yorkshire, by local woman Elizabeth Pease for over thirty years, during the eighteenth century (1728-1758). Pease brewed ale, strong beer, table beer, and small beer; however, because she brewed seasonally, her income was inconsistent and she was quite poor.

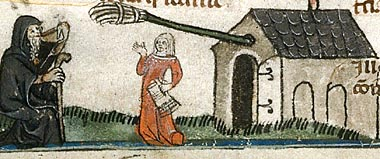
Depiction of an alewife from the Smithfield Decretals, c. 1300

During the 16th and 17th centuries, brewing in Europe changed from being mainly small scale operations by solo women or groups of monks to being mainly large scale commercial operations involving large numbers of men; although women were still involved in the sale of beer. As women were forced out of brewing, the creation of a new ideology about women brewers took place which included "the construction of women as incapable of brewing; the link of this construction to the witch; and the position of widows as both brewers and ale-sellers". Popular depictions of alewives described them as witch-like, untrustworthy, corrupt and grotesque. In Ballad on an Ale-Seller, John Lydgate describes an alewife "who uses her charms to induce men to drink". The alewife in the popular poem The Tunning of Elynour Rummyng by John Skelton, is "strikingly vicious and nasty". Other depictions of alewives in England showed them "condemned to eternal punishment in hell". However, "it is difficult to tell whether alewives or women who brewed beer were accused of witchcraft directly.".

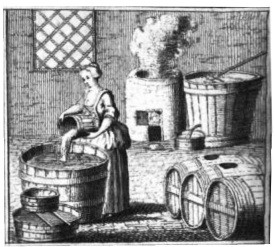
Woman brewing beer

Women of Native American societies in North America including the Apache, Maricopa, Pima, and Tohono O'odham brewed a Saguaro cactus beer or wine, called tiswin for rituals. Apache women also produced a product made from corn, which was similar to Mexican beers, known as tulpi or tulapa which was used in girls' puberty rites. The puberty ceremony includes four days of prayer, fasting, consumption of ritual food and drink, and runs dedicated to the White Painted Lady, an Apache deity. The Coahuiltecan and other tribes from their Texas vicinity made an intoxicant from yucca and the red beans of the mountain laurel.

In the North American colonies women continued with homebrewing which, for at least a century, was the predominant means of beer production. While Thomas Jefferson may have been famous for his brewing, Martha Jefferson was equally renowned for her wheat beer. The first commercial brewster in the Thirteen Colonies was Mary Lisle, who inherited her father's brewery in 1734 and operated it until 1751. In 1713, Elizabeth and John Haddon built a three-story brick mansion called New Haddonfield Plantation, where Elizabeth Haddon managed the family property and her husband tended to his missionary journeys; the Brew House she built in 1713 still stands in the backyard. Although the first recorded commercial female brewer in the Colonies was Mary Lisle, who inherited her father's Philadelphia brewpub in 1734, there is reason to believe that across the river in South Jersey, Haddon was running a more-than-average homebrew operation.

In Canada, Susannah Oland, an Englishwoman who immigrated to Canada in 1865, and her husband established a popular brewery called the Navy and Army Brewery. After her husband died, Oland established a brewery of her own, though she concealed her gender by naming the business "S. Oland Sons and Company," using her initials to hide the fact that she was a woman. She was the creator of a beer recipe which became the basis for founding Canada's oldest independent brewery, Moosehead Brewery.

In Australia evidence points to Indigenous labor divisions with men responsible for hunting and women tending to gathering and food preparation. Aboriginal women prepared alcoholic beverages from flowers. Flowers were steeped in water, or pounded to extract the nectar and mixed with honey ants to ferment.

== Modern day ==
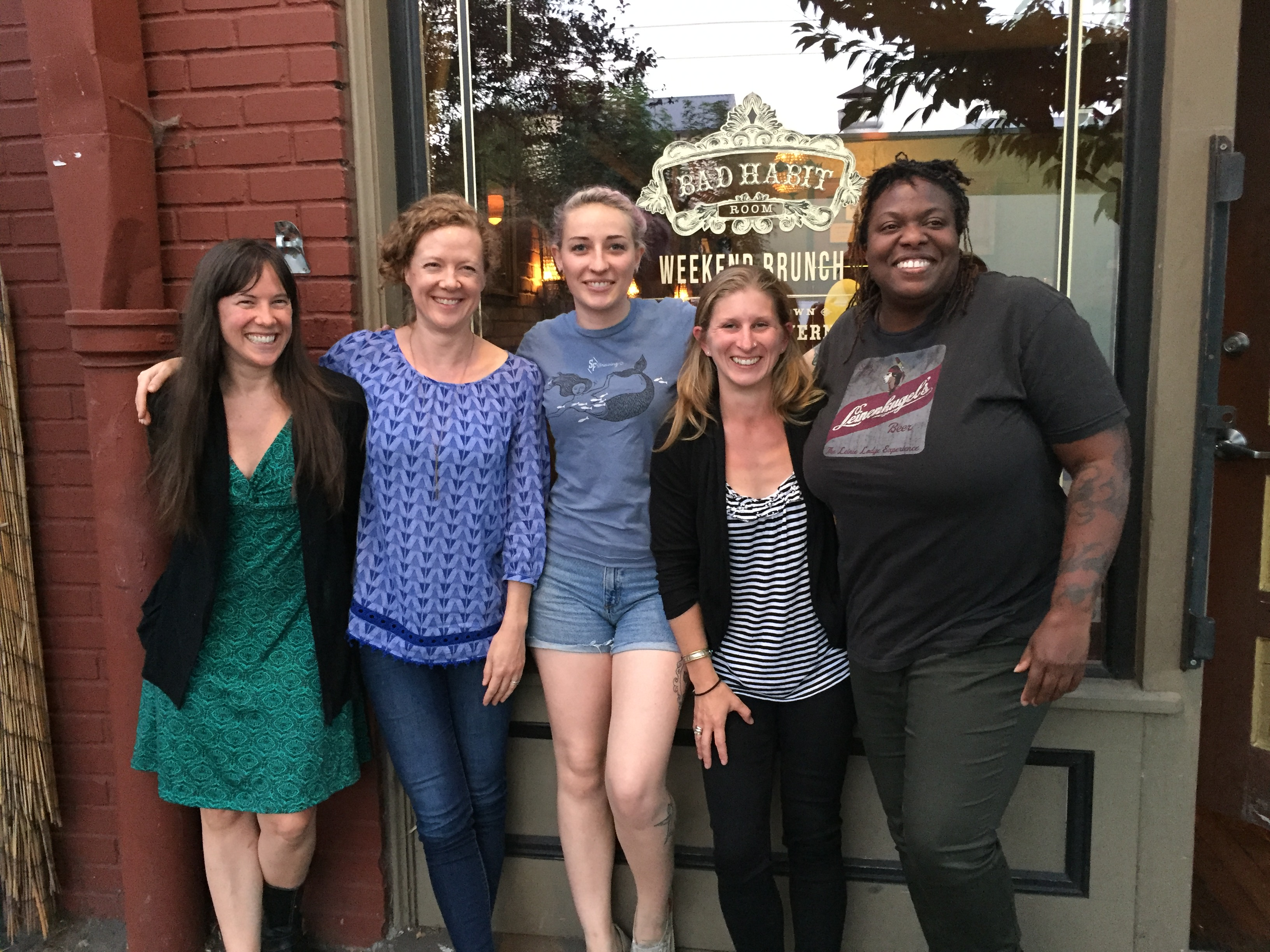
Oregonian women who work in the industry include (left to right) Sarah Pederson, owner of Saraveza, Lucy Burningham, writer, Natalie Baldwin, brewer, Emily Engdahl, director of the Pink Boots Society, and Lee Hedgmon, homebrewer and professional distiller.

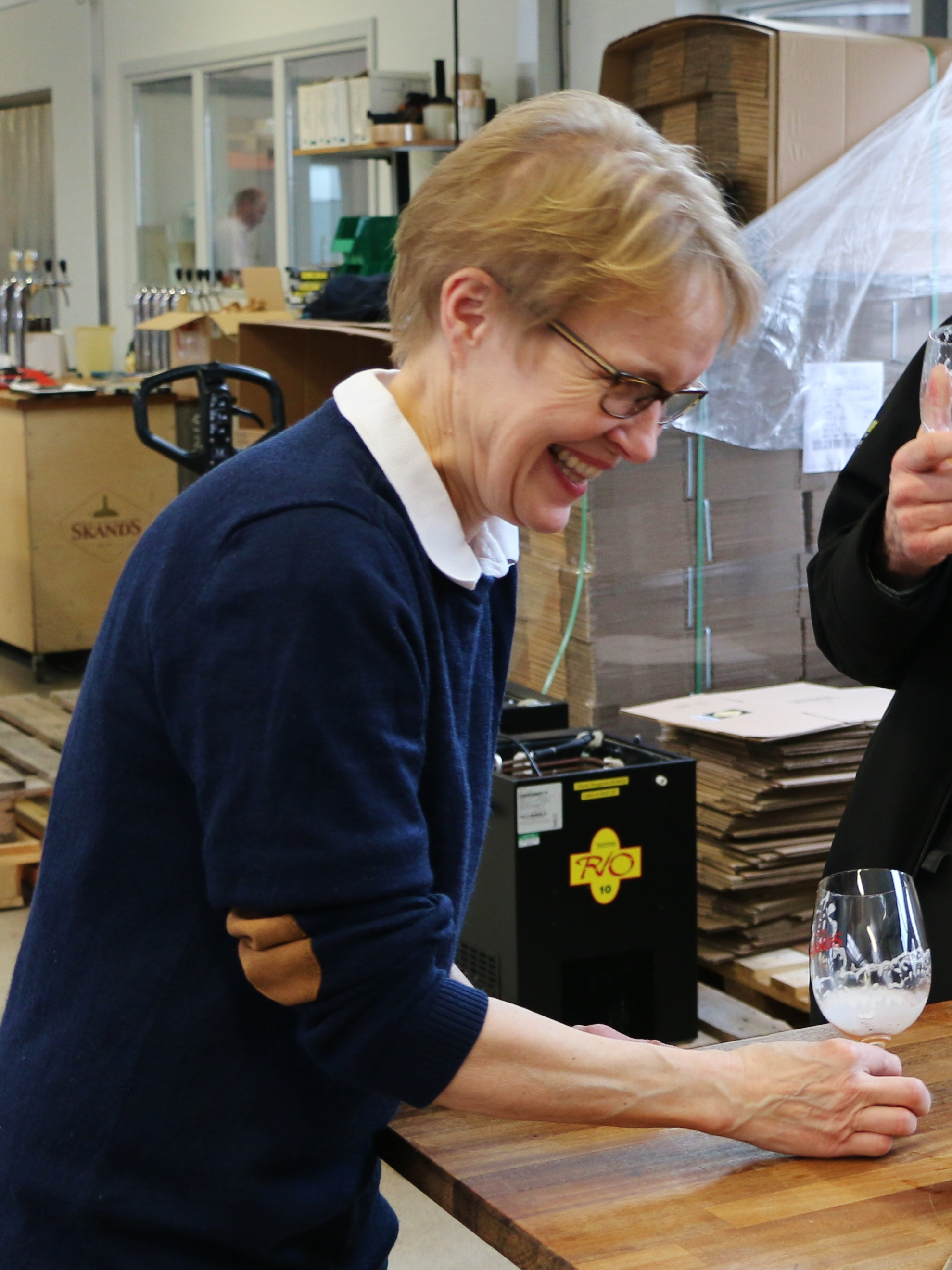
Birthe Skands (born 29 March 1956)^{da} is a Danish brewmaster and business woman who, together with her husband Morten Skands, manages Skands Brewery in Brøndby in Denmark and she is also the director of the Skands Microbrewery^{da}.

From the beginning of industrialization to the 1960s and early 1970s, most women were moved out of the brewing industry, though throughout the world, they continued to homebrew following ancestral methods. "The main obstacles that women continue to face in [the] industry include perceptions of taste, media influence, and preconceived notions about their skill and ability", according to journalist Krystal Baugher.

American women such as Jill Vaughn and Rebecca Bennett have been successful at becoming top brewmasters at Anheuser-Busch, where they developed brands such as Bud Light Platinum, Shock Top and the Straw-Ber-Rita. I. Patricia Henry is the first African American woman to manage a major American brewery Miller Brewing Company, now MillerCoors, in Eden, NC. Suzanne Stern Denison and Jane Zimmerman worked at and invested in Sonoma, California's long-shuttered New Albion Brewing, established in 1976 and the first new brewery in America since Prohibition; Jack McAuliffe is most often the only person mentioned as founder. Hart Brewing was co-founded by Beth Hartwell and Tom Baune in 1984 in Kalama, Washington; they were early pioneers of craft brewing in the Pacific Northwest and Hart was the first known woman to co-own a brewery in the post-Prohibition era. Mari Kemper and husband Will opened Thomas Kemper Brewing on Bainbridge Island (near Seattle) in 1985 and now co-own Chuckanut Brewery & Kitchen in Bellingham. Mellie Pullman is a professor at Portland State University; where she became the first known female brewmaster in the United States when she took a job at Schirf Brewing in Park City, Utah in 1986. Carol Stoudt founded Stoudts Brewing Company in Adamstown, Pennsylvania in 1987; she was one of the first female brewmasters since Prohibition in the country and the nation's first known female sole proprietor. Teri Fahrendorf was the third female craft brewmaster in the country; she worked as a brewer at Golden Gate Brewery and Triple Rock Brewery in Berkeley, California, Steelhead Brewery in Eugene, Oregon. Fahrendorf later founded the Pink Boots Society. Kim Jordan co-founded New Belgium Brewing Company with husband Jeff Lebesch in 1991 in Fort Collins, Colorado. Leah Wong Ashburn took over for father Oscar Wong, who opened Highland Brewing Co. in 1994; it is one of North Carolina's oldest breweries. Mariah and Sam Calagione co-founded Dogfish Head Craft Brewery in 1995. Natalie and Vinnie Cilurzo, Russian River Brewing's original brewer, acquired the rights to the brand and opened a brewpub in Santa Rosa, California in 2004. Other women opened early craft breweries in America and have served in numerous capacities other than as the brewer. These include Marcy Larson, who co-founded the Alaskan Brewing Company with husband Geoff in 1986 in Juneau, Alaska; Irene Firmat, who founded Full Sail Brewing Company in 1987 in Hood River, Oregon; Rose Ann Finkel co-founded Pike Brewing Company with husband Charles Finkel in Seattle, Washington in 1989 (and Merchant du Vin in 1978); and Deborah Carey, who founded New Glarus Brewing Company with husband Daniel in 1993 in New Glarus, Wisconsin.

More recently, women in America have opened breweries across the country. Ting Su, her husband Jeremy Raub, and her father-in-law, Steven Raub, opened Eagle Rock Brewery in Los Angeles in 2009; they are considered founders of the craft brewing scene there. CEO and head brewer Eilise Lane learned to brew beer in the Northwest and now runs the Scarlet Lane Brewing Company in 2014 in Indiana. Kate Power, Betsy Lay, and Jen Cuesta co-founded Lady Justice Brewing in 2016 in Aurora, Colorado; their brewery donates to human rights and social justice organizations, specifically supporting organizations that benefit women and girls. In 2018, brewers Celeste Beatty and Briana Brake co-founded Rocky Mount Brewing, which is a "brewery incubator" space for new brewers in Rocky Mount, North Carolina. Brake owns and brews for her company, Spaceway Brewing, which she started in 2018. Beatty, who opened the Harlem Brewing Company in New York in 2000, is the first known Black woman to own a brewery in the United States in the post-Prohibition era. Carol Pak is the founder of Makku, America's first canned craft makgeolli company (she calls it "Korean rice beer"); the business was started in New York City in 2018 and is hand-crafted in Maine. In 2019, Tamil Maldonado Vega co-founded Raices Brewing in Denver, Colorado; it is a Latino owned and operated brewery that also acts as a reference center for those interested in learning about Latin culture. In 2016, Shyla Sheppard and Missy Begay founded Bow and Arrow Brewing Co. in Albuquerque, New Mexico, which is known for drawing on indigenous ingredients for their beers; it is the only known Native woman-owned brewery in the U.S.

Among Canada's women brewers are Emily Tipton, co-owner and brewmaster of Boxing Rock Brewing, and Kellye Robertson, who began her career at Garrison Brewing before heading the brewing team at Spindrift Brewing.

There are several women involved in the brewing business in Mexico City, Mexico. Elizabeth Rosas is the co-founder of Cervecería Calavera and head of branding and marketing; she and husband Gilbert Nielsen started the brewery in 2008. Lucía Carrillo is the co-founder and brewer of Cervecería Itañeñe, which opened in 2011. Cervecería Dos Mundos (“Two Worlds Brewery”) was co-founded in 2014 by British-Mexican couple Caroline King and David Meza in the Iztapalapa neighborhood of Mexico City. Antonieta Carrión founded Casa Cervecera Madrina in 2014 and is likely the first female sole owner and brewer of a cervecería in Mexico City; she is also one of the founding members of the Adelitas beer collective. Jessica Martínez opened Cervecería Malteza in 2014. Sandra Navarro is a founding partner and lead brewer at the Turulata Brewing Company, Monterrey, Nuevo León, Mexico. Paz Austin is the General Director for the Mexican Association of Beer Makers (ACERMEX).

In Latin America, chicha is still widely produced by women and consumed daily by adults and children, as it typically has a low alcohol content. In Ecuador women harvest yucca, boil the roots, pound it into a paste and then chew the paste, in much the same way as their ancestors did, to break down the starches and begin the fermentation process. Peruvian women make their version of chicha using the same method, but with corn. In Brazil, Argentina and Paraguay, among Amazonian Indians, chicha, made from corn, or algarroba beer made from carob seed, as well as beer produced from mixing corn or manioc with apples, melons, papaya, pears, pumpkin, quince, strawberries and sweet potatoes are brewed by women. Bolivian women make beer from roasted barley, which is then chewed to begin the fermentation process and is served daily as a dietary supplement.

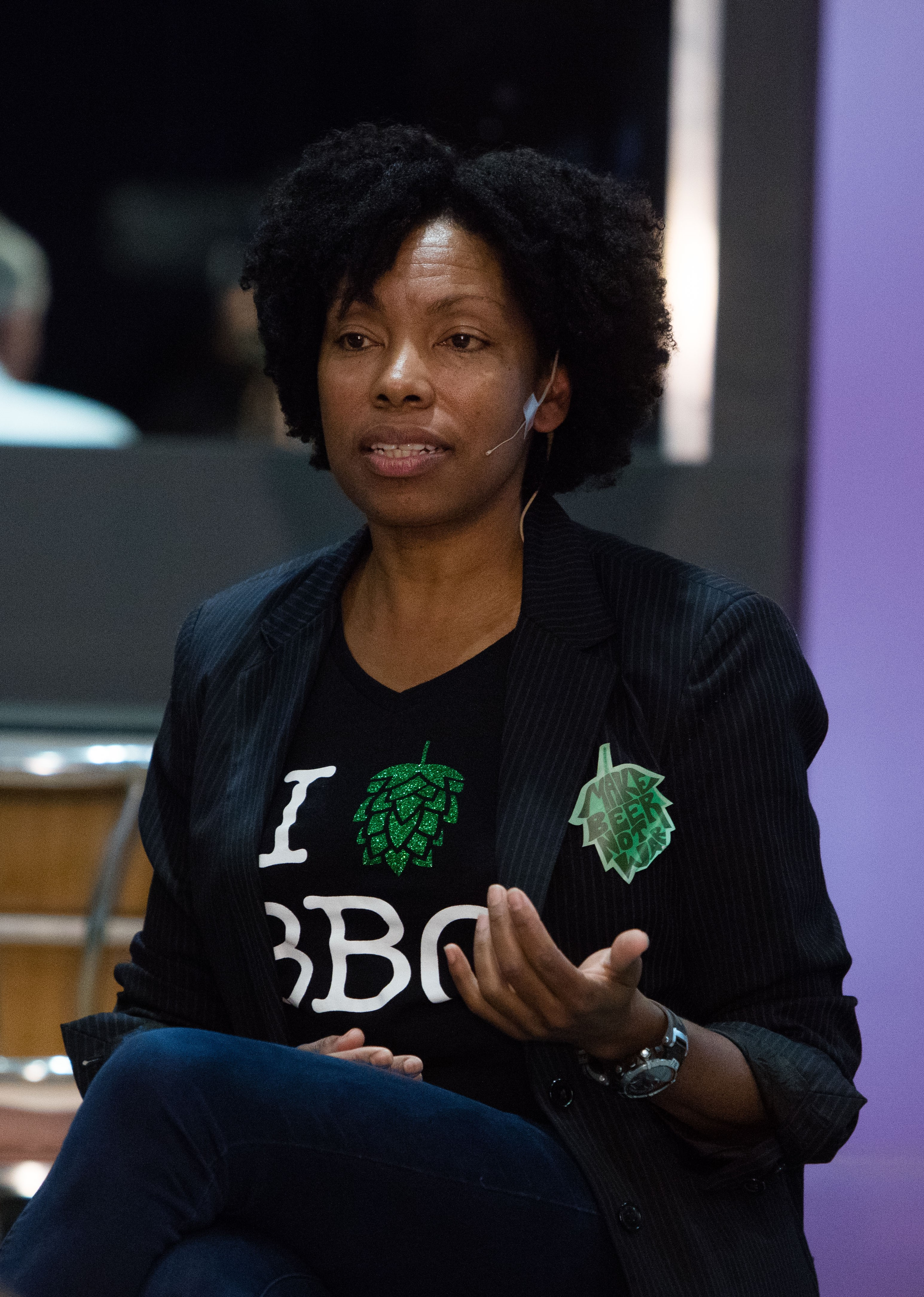
Celeste Beatty

In Britain, Hester Parnall was director and chair of St Austell Brewery from 1916 to 1939. In 2013, Sara Barton, owner and director of Brewster's Brewery, won the Brewer of the Year award, becoming the first woman to receive the honor bestowed annually by the British Guild of Beer Writers. Emma Gilleland, who heads the supply chain at Marston's Brewery, the leading independent brewer in Britain, was called the most influential brewer in the UK by the BBC.

Women Brewing 2015 Common Thread Beer for Madison Craft Beer Week.

A noted German brewster, who is also Bavaria's last masterbrewer nun, Sister Doris Engelhard, has been creating beer at Mallersdorf Abbey for over 40 years. Other female Bavarian brewers are Sigi Friedmann of Friedmann's Brewery (German: Brauerei Friedmann) in Gräfenberg and Gisela and Monika Meinel of the Meinel-Bräu Brewery in Hof. An de Ryck is one of the few women brewers in Belgium. She has run the De Ryck Brewery (Dutch: Brouwerij De Ryck) since the 1970s, winning several awards for the beers she has produced. Rosa Merckx became the first official female brewmaster and operations director in Belgium when she took over the Liefmans Oudenaarde brewery in 1972, where she had worked since 1946. An ambitious brewery in Iceland run by Þórey Björk is called Lady Brewery. The brewery started late 2017 releasing the breweries signature beer named First Lady - IPA.

In 2015, the BBC's "100 Women" project, honored Leimin Duong, a Vietnamese-Australian woman, who brews strawberry beer, as one of the most influential women of the year. In Australia, the first all-female brewery in the country, Two Birds Brewing, has won multiple awards for their beers, but in 2016, owners Jayne Lewis and Danielle Allen were honored with the Champion trophy for Medium Australian Brewery by the Australian International Beer Awards.

In many traditional African cultures, beer is still made only by women and often their sole source of attaining economic autonomy. For example, in Cameroon women of the Gbaya people make a traditional beer from maize and sorghum called amgba, which is a dietary staple and women of the Mafa people brew bilbil – called dong-long in the Tupuri language, uzum in the Giziga language, and zom in the Mafa language – from millet. Both originated as ritual drinks for ceremonies, but now are used as a means of economic survival for many women. Sorghum beers produced by women in other African nations include bili bili in Chad, burkutu or pito in Ghana and Nigeria, chibuku or doro in Zimbabwe, dolo in Burkina Faso, ikigage in Rwanda, kaffir in South Africa, merissa in Sudan, mtama in Tanzania, and tchoukoutou in Benin and Togo. In South Africa's Xhosa and Zulu ethnicities, women were traditionally in charge of brewing umqombothi, a homemade beer made from maize malt, sorghum malt, yeast, and water. Umqombothi is prepared over an open fire and poured into a large drum called a gogogo.

In African commercial breweries, though women are often partners with their spouses, only about six are operated by women brewers. One of these, Apiwe Nxusani-Mawela, is a brewer, brewery owner and the first black South African accredited as a trainer for the Institute of Brewing and Distilling and as a certified beer judge for the South Africa Beer Judging Certification Program. Another is Thea Blom, who began as a chef and then added a craft brewery to her business, Oakes Brew House, and hired brewer Happy Sekanka to create the firm's beers. Josephine "Fina" Uwineza, a restaurateur in Rwanda began evaluating whether opening the first craft beer brewery in the country could be used as a platform to empower women and offer them employment. In 2016, she partnered with the Ontario Craft Brewers Association to explore creating the venture.

In Nepal, as they have for centuries, women brew raksi, a pungent distilled alcoholic beverage made from rice. It was originally used for ceremonial purposes in Hindu and Buddhist rites, but is such a key part of customary life in the Kathmandu Valley, that authorities routinely ignore legal prohibitions against production and consumption. Women traditionally engage in the month-long brewing process and sell their excess raksi to restaurants. Other important Nepali brewed drinks are Chhyang, Jaandh, Thon, and Tongba, (known by various names and spellings), which are traditionally made by women. Made in both Nepal and Tibet, the drinks are made from barley, rice or millet. After soaking the grain in water, it is steamed and then mixed with a starting agent known as marcha, which is prepared from either wheat flakes (called mana) or rice or millet flour (known as manapu). The recipe for making marcha is sometimes a highly guarded secret and passed on only to daughters-in-law.

In Japan, after the commercialization of brewing, sake brewers, known as tōji (Japanese: 杜氏) were for generations, migrants who traveled between breweries and worked during the winter season. As sake sales declined along with the number of trained tōji, owners started brewing themselves. Though most sake brewers are men, as of 2015, there are approximately 20 female tōji brewing in Japan and The Women's Sake Industry Group has been formed to increase their numbers. Emi Machida (Japanese: 町田恵美さん) has run her family's 130-year-old brewery for ten years as the masterbrewer and has won seven gold medals for her sake from the Annual Japan Sake Awards. Miho Imada (Japanese: みほ いまだ) is noted for her Hiroshima-style junmai ginjo method which uses very soft water, low temperatures and a slow fermentation process to bring out the fruity flavors and aromatics. Minoh Brewing, which opened in 1997 near Osaka, is run by Kaori Oshita.

In South Korea, Seolhee Lee is Magpie Brewing Company's pioneering female brewer; the company is co-owned by Tiffany Needham.

The Pink Boots Society is an organization that supports women working in the beer industry. It was founded by Teri Farhrendorf, who was in turn inspired by an early brewmaster, Carol Stoudt, who launched her own brewery in 1987. There are Pink Boots Society chapters in Canada, Australia and the United States. The Female Beer Tasters in Mexico is an NGO created in 2012 to promote the culture and education of beer; in 2020, it had over 2,000 members with representatives and coordinators in 15 cities in Mexico and San Diego, California. Adelitas Cerveceras, a collective of 130 Mexican women that was established in 2019, promotes the participation of women in the beer industry through a support and career network.

Bière de Femme, in North Carolina, was founded in 2017 as an event to bring women in the beer industry together, but also to meet consumers and craft beer enthusiasts of all genders. FemAle Brew Fest, a Florida beer festival, was established in 2016 to support the growth of women in brewing. In Sweden, they produced a beer named "We Can Do It", modeled on the Rosie the Riveter poster by Westinghouse in 2015. The goal was to create a beer made by women, which was not fruity or mild, but rather based on a scientific review of what women actually wanted to drink. Women have also been recognized in home brewing. In 2013, Annie Johnson won the American Homebrewers Association's Homebrewer of the Year award.

== See also ==
- Agnes Bugge medieval English brewer
- Apiwe Nxusani-Mawela South African brewmaster
- Sophie de Ronde British brewer
- Beer
- International Women's Collaboration Brew Day
- History of beer
- Pink Boots Society
- SheBrew
- Winemaking
