= Uwineza =

Uwineza is a surname. Notable people with the surname include:

- Beline Uwineza, Rwandan politician
- Josephine Uwineza, Rwandan entrepreneur
