= Rebecca Bennett =

Rebecca Bennett may refer to:

- Rebecca Bennett (canoeist) (born 1977), American slalom kayaker, married name Rebecca Giddens
- Rebecca Bennett (brewer) (born 1983), American executive at AB InBev
- Rebecca Bennett (politician) (born 1987), American politician
- Rebecca Bennett (sprinter) (born 1999), Australian medalist in running competitions
