= Rebecca Bennett (brewer) =

American brewmaster (born 1983)

- Born: Rebecca Reid; 1983 (age 42–43)
- Education: Purdue University
- Occupation: Brewer/brewmaster
- Employer: Anheuser-Busch InBev

Rebecca Bennett (née Reid; born 1983) is an American brewmaster. She has worked in various positions at Anheuser-Busch InBev, most recently serving as a senior quality manager in Baldwinsville, New York. She also held the assistant brewmaster post (2015–2018) at the Baldwinsville facility and previously was a product development specialist (2010–2015) and group manager (2005–2010) at the St. Louis, Missouri, facility. She graduated from Purdue University with a bachelor's degree in chemical engineering in 2005.

== Early life ==
Rebecca Bennett was born in 1983 to Vickie and Christopher Reid; she and her brother, Timothy, grew up in Fort Wayne, Indiana.

Bennett's father was an electrical engineer, and as a high school student she learned about a women in engineering outreach program, something that increased her awareness of her father's work and made that a plausible career for her. In her freshman year at Purdue, Bennett learned more about the versatility of chemical engineering and spent two summers at Eastman Chemical working on chemicals used in plastics and gas-collection systems. Those internships showed her that she didn't want to work for large chemical companies and caused her to question her major; she met staff from Anheuser-Busch at Purdue's Industrial Roundtable and it shifted how she thought about her career possibilities. Pete Kraemer, a fifth-generation brew master at Anheuser-Busch, was a guest lecturer in one of her classes, and that experience showed her that her schoolwork was applicable to making beer.

== Work at Anheuser-Busch ==
She graduated in May 2005 and was working for Anheuser-Busch in June. Before joining Anheuser-Busch, Bennett said she "always liked beer, but I honestly didn't know a lot about it when I got here." She learned quickly, working first as a production supervisor at the main brewery (2005), a member of the innovation group (2010), and head of the pilot brewery (2013). Unlike Pete Kraemer, Bennett didn't grow up in a house where beer or brewing were prevalent, but her science background was helpful. In her work at the pilot brewery, Bennett experimented with new beers in a scaled-down replica of the main brewery; each batch of beer is 10 barrels and most of the 500 recipes she and her team brewed each year never moved beyond the experimental stage. She liked being able to combine her STEM studies with management, marketing, and tasting.

Bennett developed the recipe for Bud Light Platinum and Michelob Ultra-Light Cider. She and Jill Vaughn developed Shock Top and the Straw-Ber-Rita. After her move to Anheuser-Busch's Baldwinsville Brewery, Bennett worked on Bud Light Seltzer.

Bennett is creative with ingredients; she mixed hibiscus flowers with wheat and lemon peels to approximate the taste of a “strawberry lemonade” beer, an idea that emerged from a baking recipe with chocolate chili powder cupcakes and hibiscus frosting. She has also found inspiration in cocktails: "from an ingredient perspective, there's a lot of fun things happening in cocktails, and being able to cull inspiration from that and work that into beer is exciting."

== Impact and demographics ==
Bennett says she doesn't feel like a trailblazer in a brew master's masculine world, citing an increase in women brewers and her work at Anheuser-Busch InBev with Jane Killebrew and Jill Vaughn. There was, as of 2013 a substantial gender imbalance in brewer masters. In 2013, Teri Fahrendorf, brew master and founder of the Pink Boots Society, estimated that 99% of brew masters are men; the Siebel Institute, a brewing academy, says only about 5% of its students are women.

As an African American millennial in the brewing industry, Bennett is outside the norm of industry demographics. She said that "People have a perception that brewers are all guys with beards and are surprised when they see me, an African-American female. I tell them that I am a brewer, and that the brewing process is really rooted in science. There is so much you can do with a STEM degree."
