= Showa Women's University Junior College =

Private junior college in Setagaya, Tokyo, Japan

Coordinates: 35°38′35.8″N 139°40′32.9″E

- 昭和女子大学短期大学部
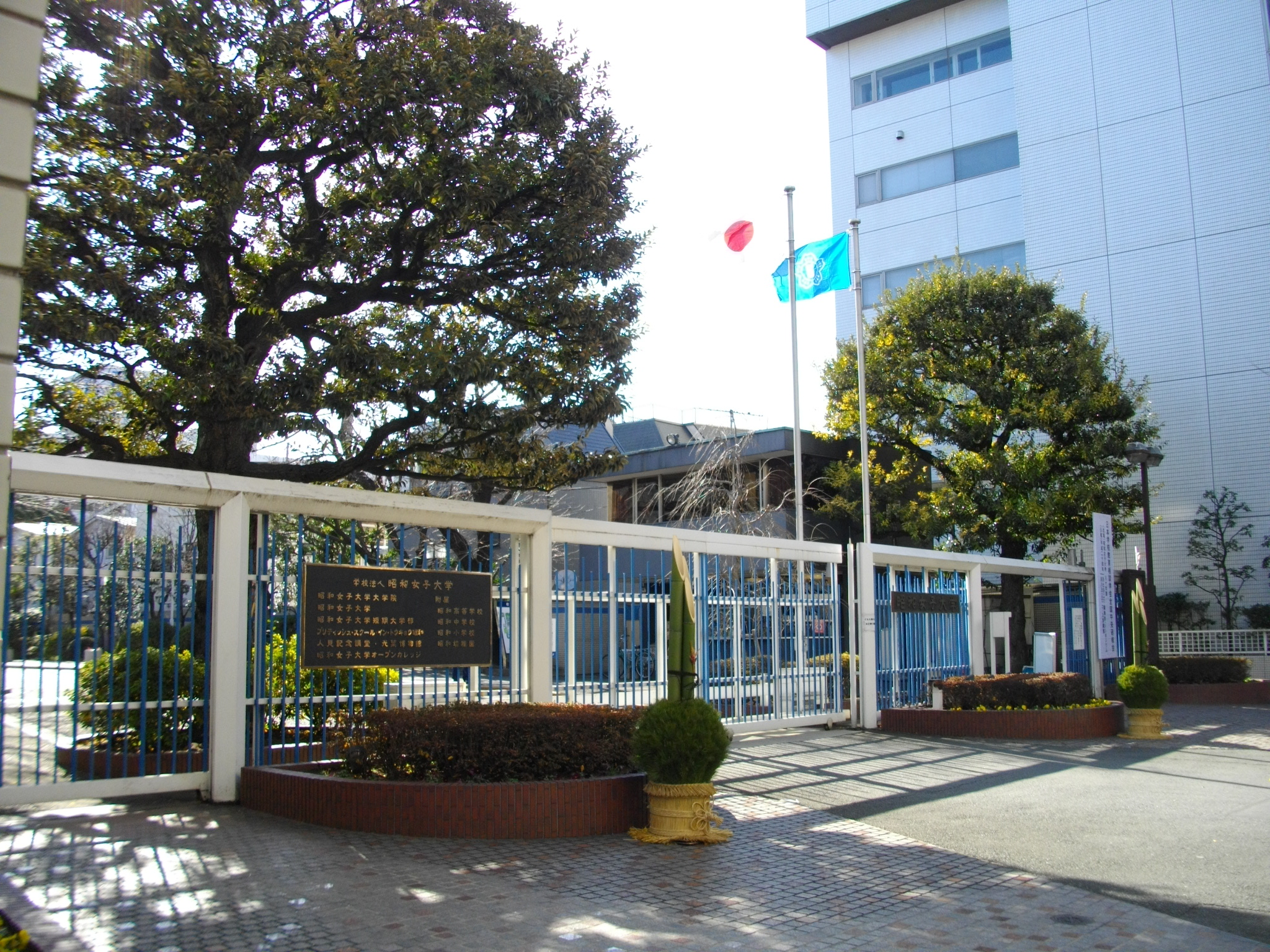
- Showa Women's University entrance
- Type: Private
- Location: Setagaya, Tokyo, Japan
- Website: www.swu.ac.jp/university/j_index.html

Showa Women's University Junior College (昭和女子大学短期大学部, Shōwa Joshi Daigaku Tanki Daigakubu) is a private junior college in Setagaya, Tokyo, Japan. It was established in 1950.

== See also ==
- Showa Women's University
- List of junior colleges in Japan
