= Mariko Bando =

Japanese writer, critic, and university president

- 坂東 眞理子
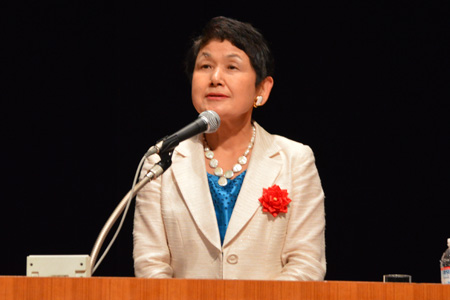
- Bando speaking at conference in 2013
- Born: 1946 (age 79–80); Toyama Prefecture, Japan
- Education: University of Tokyo
- Occupations: Writer, critic, civil servant
- Notable work: The Dignity of a Woman (女性の品格)

Mariko Bando (坂東 眞理子, Bandō Mariko) is a Japanese writer, critic, and former bureaucrat. Bando started her career in the Prime Minister's office, later becoming a consul general and the first director general of the Japanese Cabinet Office's Gender Equality Bureau. Her 2006 book The Dignity of a Woman has sold more than three million copies in Japan. She is currently the president and chancellor of Showa Women's University.

== Early life and education ==
Bando was born in Toyama Prefecture and attended Toyama Chubu High School. Bando completed her undergraduate education at the University of Tokyo. In 2001 she received an honorary doctorate from Queensland University of Technology.

== Career ==
After graduating from the University of Tokyo in 1969, Bando entered the Japanese civil service. She became the first woman in a career post in the office of the Prime Minister of Japan. Her civil service career included numerous posts in the office of the Prime Minister of Japan, the Bureau of Statistics, and the Cabinet Secretariat, including posts overseeing policy on gender equality, youth, and the elderly. In 1978 she wrote the first white paper on gender inequality in Japan. In 1981 she spent a term at Harvard University's Mary I. Bunting Institute studying women managers.

From 1995 to 1998 Bando was the Vice Governor of Saitama Prefecture. In 1998, with her appointment as consul general in Brisbane, Australia, she became the first woman to hold a Japanese consul general post.

From 2001 to 2003 Bando was the inaugural director general of the Japanese government's Gender Equality Bureau. During Bando's tenure Japan enacted the 2001 Law on Prevention of Spouse Violence and Protection of Victims, which expanded the range of possible domestic violence offenses and penalties and increased government support for survivors. In 2003 she led the Japanese delegation to the United Nations Committee on the Elimination of Discrimination against Women. Bloomberg Businessweek described Bando as "the Japanese government's front-and-center spokeswoman, cheerleader, and champion of its policy of leveling the playing field for women". In the same year, Bando ran for governor of Saitama Prefecture but lost to Kiyoshi Ueda.

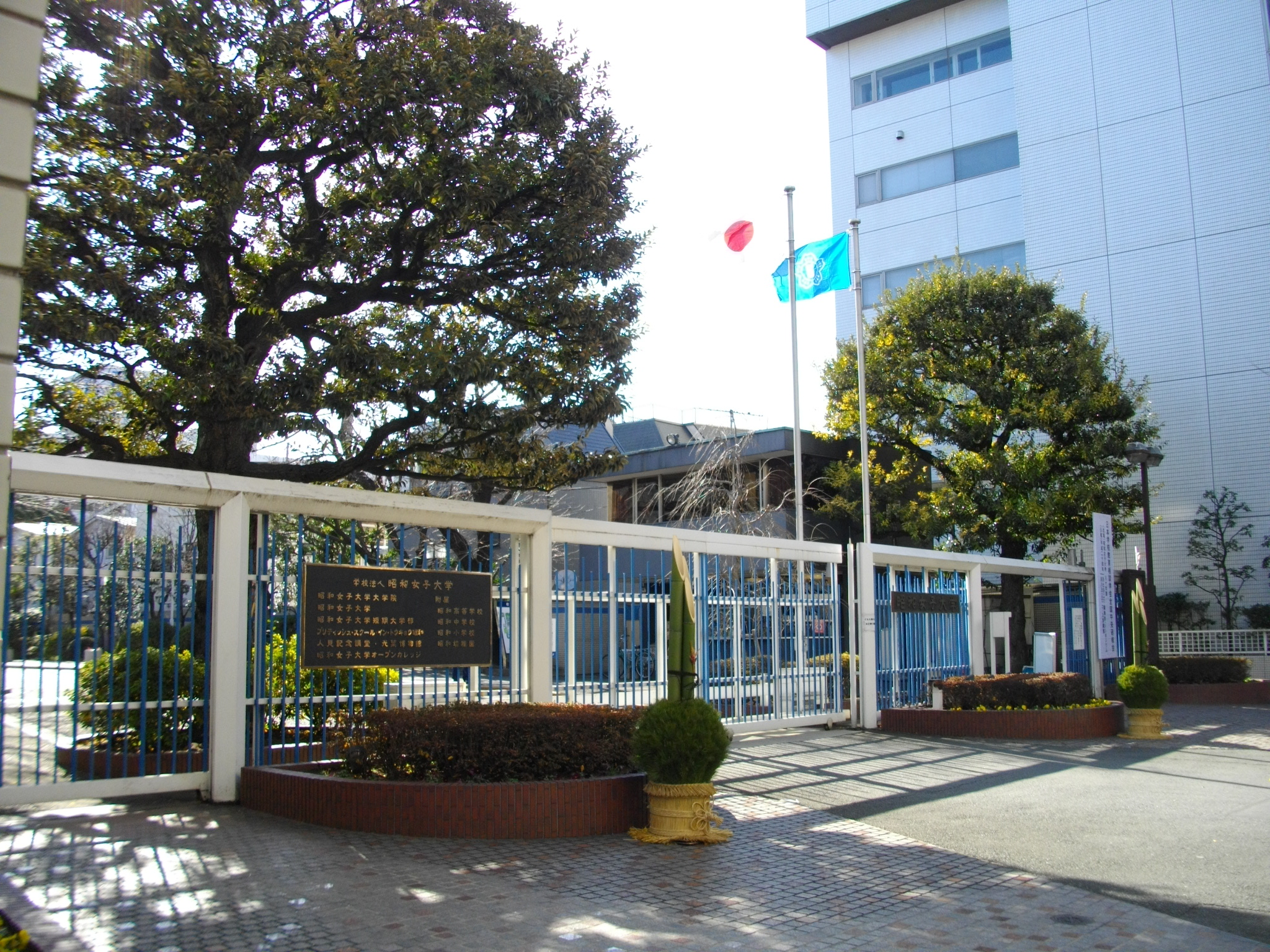
Showa Women's University

Since 2003 Bando has worked in various capacities at Showa Women's University, most recently as president and chancellor. She has claimed that the career change reflected her desire to help women workers more directly through education. During her tenure as chancellor, Showa Women's University eliminated its junior college and partnered with Temple University to move the Temple University, Japan Campus to the Showa Women's University campus.

== Writing ==
Bando has written books on a variety of topics, including aging, leadership, and etiquette. At age 60 she wrote The Dignity of a Woman (女性の品格, Josei no hinkaku), a practical guide for women, especially younger working women, on how to maintain "dignity" in speech, manners, and dress. The Dignity of a Woman, published in 2006, became the number one bestseller in Japan in 2007. Bando attributed its sales success to "the public's appetite for books on traditional values". A study by scholar Hiroko Hirakawa found that many women objected to the book's portrayal of the "dignified woman" as a "superwoman who projects an upper-class aura while remaining ever modest and grounded in an appreciation for the old-fashioned values of frugality, respect, and sentiment". The Dignity of a Woman sold over three million copies in Japan.

== Personal life ==
Bando married at the age of 24, while working in the office of the Prime Minister of Japan, and had her first child at age 26. She has two children.

== Selected works ==
- Toward a Gender Equality Society (男女共同参画社会へ, Danjo kyōdō sankaku shakai e), Keisō Shobō, 2004, ISBN 9784326652990
- The Dignity of a Woman (女性の品格 : 装いから生き方まで, Josei no hinkaku: Yosooi kara ikikata made), PHP Kenkyūjo, 2006, ISBN 9784569657059
- Utsukushii nihongo no susume (美しい日本語のすすめ), Shōgakukan, 2009, ISBN 9784098250516
- Iiwake shiteru bāi ka : datsu mō osoikamo shōkōgun (言い訳してる場合か! : 脫・もう遅いかも症候群), Hōken, 2017, ISBN 9784865134384
