= Emi Machida =

Japanese master sake brewer

Emi Machida (町田 恵美, Machida Emi) is a toji, or master sake brewer in Japan. Machida is the first toji in her family, who have owned the Machida Brewery in Gunma for over 130 years. Machida is also an active member of the Women's Sake Industry Group. Machida's featured sake is the Junmai 60 Wakamizu (純米60 若水). Her other well-known brand is the Liao Sei. Her sakes have won seven gold medals at the Annual Japan Sake Awards.

== Biography ==
Machida was born in 1975 in Maebashi in the Gunma Prefecture of northern Japan and raised along with her two sisters at the brewery her family established 1883. Machida was the oldest daughter in her family of three sisters. After graduating from the local girl's high school, Machida attended college in Tokyo, graduating in 1996 with a degree in literature from Showa Women's University. After working in an unsatisfying career for three years, in 2000 she decided to go into the family business, Machida Brewery, and left her life in Tokyo where her next youngest sister is a dancer and her youngest sister is a chef.

Machida's knowledge about brewing sake comes from working with older brewers and studying recipes in books. Machida faced some gender discrimination when she entered the family business. Brewing sake, while once the job of women, had become completely male-dominated. She was the first woman tōji in Gunma Prefecture. During the time her grandfather ran the brewery, he kept women out of the brewery because they were "seen as dirty, unclean." When Machida started working in the brewery, she said that at first, her all-male employees refused to listen to her, and deliberately put things in the wrong place. In addition, some customers refused to buy sake created by a woman.

When she married in 2001, her husband, Akiya, adopted her surname and joined the family business. In 2006, her brewery won their first gold medal for sake production, the first time a woman had won. Since the first win, Machida has won seven gold medals at the Annual Japan Sake Awards, as well as three gold medals in 2008 from the "Excellence Award of the Kanto Shinetsu Tax Bureau Liquor Review Committee", the "National Shuzo Kaikai" prize, and the "Honorable Examination of Gunma Prefecture".
