= Agnes Bugge =

English female brewer

- Born: before 1417
- Died: after 1430
- Occupation: Brewer
- Spouse: Stephen Bugge

Agnes Bugge (fl. 1417–1430) was an English female brewer in London, who was notable for running a brewery independently of her husband during the 15th-century.

== Life ==
Agnes Bugge was the wife of draper Stephen Bugge and lived in London. At the time, wives usually assisted their husbands in breweries with their contributions never being identified in records. In Bugge's case, her husband worked as a draper while she was the one managing the brewery. She paid her fees to the Brewer's Company gild independently of her husband throughout the 1420s. However, despite Bugge running the brewery, in the eyes of the law it was owned by her husband.

In 1419 and 1420, during the brewers' dispute with the City of London, the brewers decided to create a fighting fund. Stephen Bugge made the largest contribution to the cause, donating 20 shillings. Fellow female brewer Idonea Hatton's husband also made a contribution, but unlike Bugge, she operated her brewery jointly with her husband. Nineteen out of the twenty-four breweries involved in the dispute included women. Although, Bugge's brewery appeared to be the only one operated by a woman, however it was noted that 80% of the breweries were run in part by married women. The funds raised helped them win the case against the city of London. At that time, the Lord Mayor of London was Dick Whittington.

As Stephen Bugge legally owned the brewery, he bequeathed "his brewhouse" to Agnes in his will after he died in 1429.

Agnes Bugge died sometime after 1430.
