= Happy Sekanka =

South African brewmaster

- Occupation: Brewmaster

Happy Sekanka is a South African brewmaster. She is currently the brewmaster at the all-women brewery, Oakes Brew House, created by Thea Blom.

Sekanka is from the Limpopo province. She never imagined she would become a brewer, and at one time, hated the taste of beer. Sekanka was recruited to work at Oakes Brew House by Thea Blom, who had been her manager at a previous restaurant also owned by Blom. She was taught how to brew beer by Delia Bailey, a microbiologist and co-owner of Oakes Brew House.

Like many women in brewing, Sekanka has faced gender and racial stereotypes in the industry, where some men are surprised a black woman is making their beer.
