= Showa Women's University =

Women's private university in Tokyo, Japan

Coordinates: 35°38′37.4″N 139°40′32.3″E

- 昭和女子大学
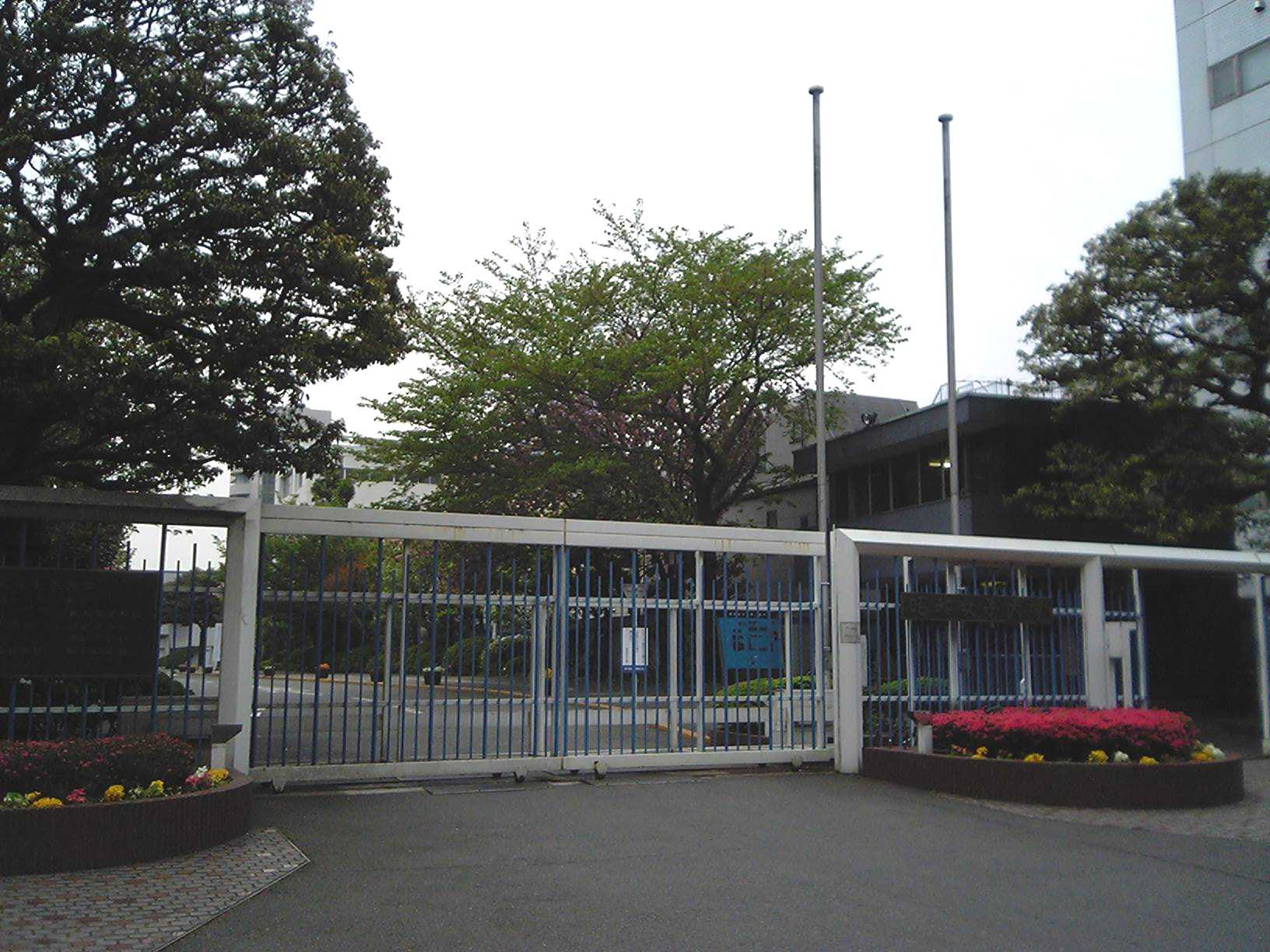
- Motto: 世の光となろう
- Motto in English: "Be a Light to the World"
- Type: Private
- Established: 1920
- Chancellor: Mariko Bando
- President: Natsuko Kohara
- Undergraduates: 6,098
- Postgraduates: 87
- Location: Setagaya, Tokyo, Japan
- Campus: Urban
- Member of: Setagaya 6 Universities consortium
- Website: swu.ac.jp

Showa Women's University (昭和女子大学, Shōwa Joshi Daigaku) is a women's private university in Setagaya, Tokyo, Japan.

== Programs ==
The university has undergraduate, graduate, and doctoral programs and five research institutes. It also contains affiliated schools that span from kindergarten to high school. Aside from the main campus in Setagaya, the university has two satellite campuses: Tomei Gakurin in Kanagawa, and Boshu Kaihin Gakuryo in Chiba. There is also an international campus in Boston, Massachusetts. The Setagaya campus is home to The British School in Tokyo Showa Campus.

The university is heavily inspired by the Tolstoyan movement. The university was based on the principles of "love, compassion, and harmony" (Japanese: 清き気品, 篤き至誠, 高き識見) according teachings of Leo Tolstoy. The university's education system was inspired by Tolstoy's teaching style at his estate in Yasnaya Polyana.

Despite similar names, the university has no affiliation with Showa University or Showa Academia Musicae.

== History ==
The university's history can be traced back to the Association of Cultural Exchange (文化懇談会, bunka kōndan-kai), an intelligentsia group founded by poet Enkichi Hitomi (人見圓吉, Hitomi Enkichi, pseudonym: Tōmei Hitomi) that later evolved into Japanese Ladies' Society (日本婦人協会, Shin-fujin kyokai).

In September 1920, Enkichi Hitomi and his wife Midori (人見緑, Hitomi Midori) established the Japan Women's School of Higher Education (日本女子高等学院, Nihon Joshi Kōtō Gakuin) in Bunkyō Ward, Tokyo. The university aimed to create a new Japanese culture that supported the well-being of humanity by educating the next generation of women, who would lead the way towards progress. In his work Opening Remarks (開講の詞, Kaikō no kotoba), Hitomi encouraged students to "be a Light to the World," (世の光となろう, yo no hikari ni narou), which later became the university's official motto. The Showa Senior High School (日本女子高等学校, Nihon Joshi Kōtō Gakkō) was established soon after in 1922 as a five-year institution.

The university's original buildings were destroyed in a bomb raid during World War II, and the university was moved to its current location in Setagaya Ward, Tokyo, in 1945. The university was renamed to Showa Women's University in 1949. The kindergarten was opened in 1951, and the elementary school was opened in 1953. The International Campus Boston (Showa Boston Institute for Language and Culture) was created in 1988.

== Influence of Leo Tolstoy ==
The founding of the university was based on the teachings of Leo Tolstoy, a famous Russian author and thinker. Tolstoy believed that education should be made up of culture, which is the sum of a person's surroundings. He opposed schools at the time as "exclud[ing] the possibility of all progress" and focusing too much on rote memorization of knowledge. Tolstoyan education advocates for practical skills in a "free state," close interactions between the student and the teacher, and the universal right to free education. It also promotes balance between man and nature, and encourages learning within and fostering an appreciation of nature.

Hitomi Midori had heavily pushed for an education system inspired by the Tolstoyan movement, remarking that she wanted the university to be "a university of love as Tolstoy might have founded." In his work Memoirs from a Half-Century at the University (学園の半世紀, Gakuen no Hanseiki), Hitomi Enkichi discussed his impressions of the Tolstoyan education and noted:

"How happy it would be if there were such a school that strived for the perfect balance between love and reason."

This "perfect balance between love and reason" later became the founding principles for the university's psyche.

Today, Tolstoyan principles feature prominently at the university on the administrative and educational level. For example, the university administration is currently pursuing eco-friendly policies that preserve the environment on the local and global level and "reflect Tolstoy's teachings on the importance of balancing humans and nature." Additionally, the university teaches in seminars, a policy in place since its founding in 1920. This is based on the close-knit cohabitation of teachers and students found at Yasnaya Polyana. In terms of education style, the university actively encourages students' active interest and involvement, which is reflective of Tolstoy's belief that education should be meant to encourage critical thinking skills and self-reliance in students. The university also encourages students to cultivate real-world practical experience, which mirrors Tolstoy's emphasis on practical skills as a cornerstone of education.

There is a statue of Tolstoy in front of the auditorium. For Tolstoy's 190th birthday, the University Museum held a special exhibition on artwork by Natalya Tolstaya, a descendant of Tolstoy. The exhibit ran from December 8 to December 17, 2018, and was jointly hosted by the university and the Museum of Yasnaya Polyana.

== Organisation ==
=== Undergraduate programs ===
- Faculty of International Humanities
- Faculty of Humanities and Culture
- Faculty of Food and Health Sciences
- Faculty of Humanities and Social Sciences
- Faculty of Global Business
- Faculty of Environmental Science and Design

=== Graduate programs ===
- Letters
- Human Life Sciences

=== Others ===
- Research Institutes
  - Institute of Modern Culture
  - Institute of Women's Culture
  - Institute of International Culture
  - Institute of Psychological Studies
  - Institute of Women's Health Sciences
- Center for General Education
- Junior College

== Hitomi Memorial Hall ==
Completed in 1980, The Hitomi Kinen Kōdō on the university campus at Setagaya is famous for its great acoustics and has been used for many classical concerts with many famous conductors. Since the opening of Suntory Hall at Akasaka in central Tokyo in October 1986, the number of such prominent concerts have decreased, but it is still sometimes used for concerts open to the public.

== Primary and secondary schools on campus ==
University-affiliated

- Showa Women's University Junior-Senior High School (昭和女子大学附属昭和中学校・高等学校)
- Showa Women's University Primary School (昭和女子大学附属昭和小学校)
- Showa Women's University Kindergarten (昭和女子大学附属昭和こども園)

British School in Tokyo Showa Campus was established in 2006 and is located in Building 5.

== Notable people ==
- Mitsu Dan – actress, model, and writer
- Keiko Fukuda – highest-ranked female judoka in history
- Satoko Kitahara – Catholic saint (The Venerable)
- Emi Machida – master sake brewer (toji)
- Yui Ogura – voice actress (graduated in 2018)
- Junko Tabei – first woman to reach the summit of Mount Everest
- Yuko Nagayama - architect and professor
