= Hitomi Memorial Hall =

Concert hall at Showa Women's University, Tokyo, Japan

Coordinates: 35°38′41.33″N 139°40′35.33″E

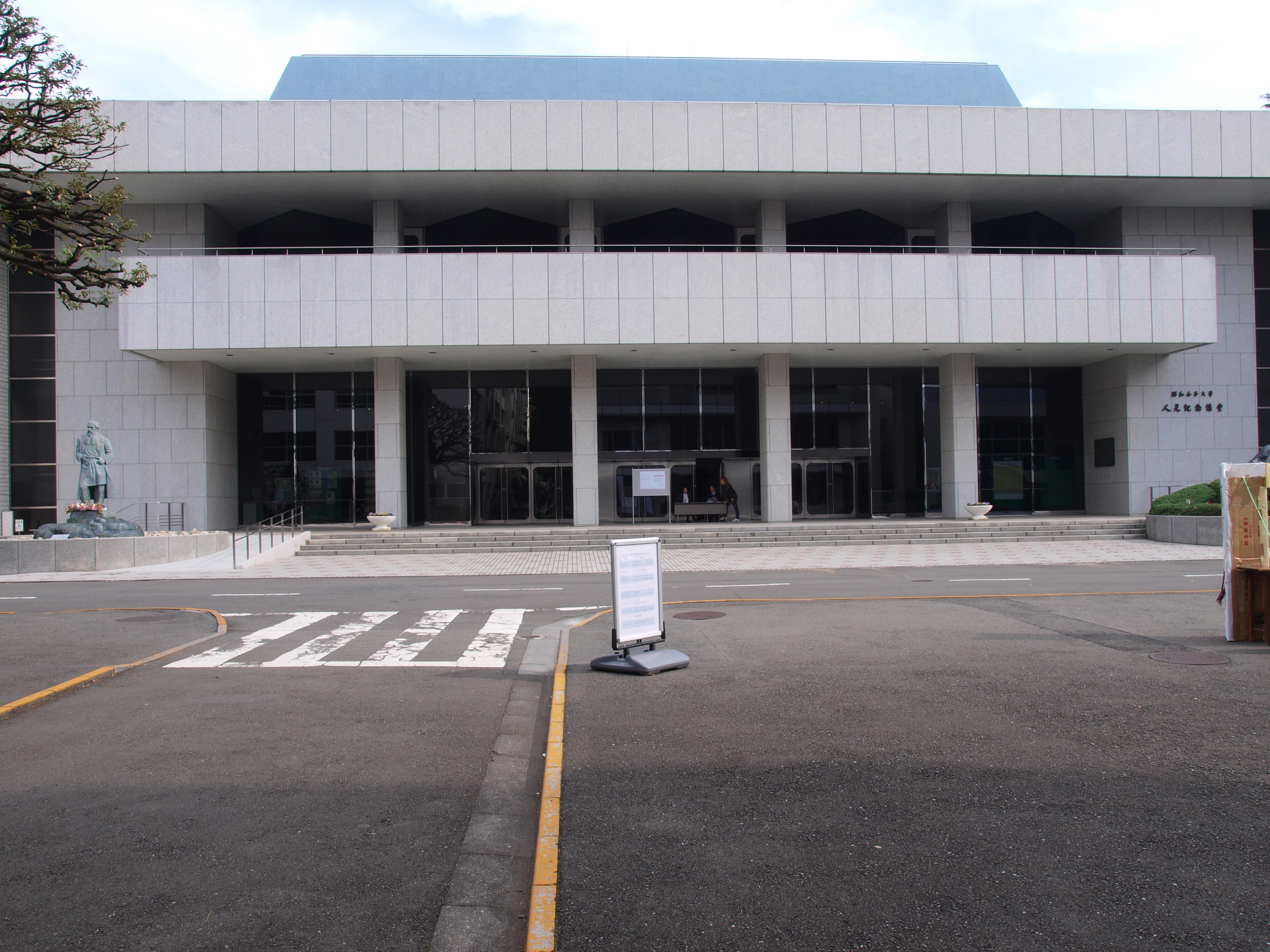
- Interactive map of Hitomi Memorial Hall
- Location: Showa Women's University, Setagaya, Tokyo, Japan
- Owner: Showa Women's University
- Capacity: 2,008
- Type: Concert Hall

Construction
- Built: 1980
- Opened: 1980

Website
- hall.swu.ac.jp/

Showa Women's University Hitomi Memorial Hall (Japanese: 昭和女子大学人見記念講堂, Hepburn: Shōwa Joshi Daigaku Hitomi Kinen Kōdō) was built by Showa Women's University in Tokyo, Japan on its campus in 1980 to celebrate the 60th anniversary of the foundation of its predecessor, the Japan Women's School of Higher Education. It is a concert venue.
