= An de Ryck =

Belgian brewster

- Born: Herzele
- Occupation: brewer
- Known for: first woman brewing engineer in Belgium in the modern age

An de Ryck (also known as Ann de Ryck or Anne de Ryck) is a Belgian brewster and the first woman brewing engineer in Belgium in the modern age. She is the granddaughter of Gustaaf de Ryck, the founder of De Ryck Brewery. During her time as brewmaster at the firm, they have won best Belgian tripel at the 2008 and 2013 European Beer Star, and the bronze medal from the World Beer Cup, in both 2006 and 2008.

== Early life ==
An De Ryck was born and grew up in Herzele, in the Flemish Region of Belgium and from a young age wanted to become a brewster. Her father, Paul De Ryck's dissuasion only reinforced her desire and resolve. As an only child, An grew up playing in the brewery and from age twelve began to do chores in the family business. After completing her secondary education, she enrolled in a brewing engineering degree at KaHo Sint-Lieven University College in Ghent, where she studied brewing technology along with biochemistry, chemistry and microbiology. When she graduated, she became the first woman brewing engineer in Belgium.

== Career ==
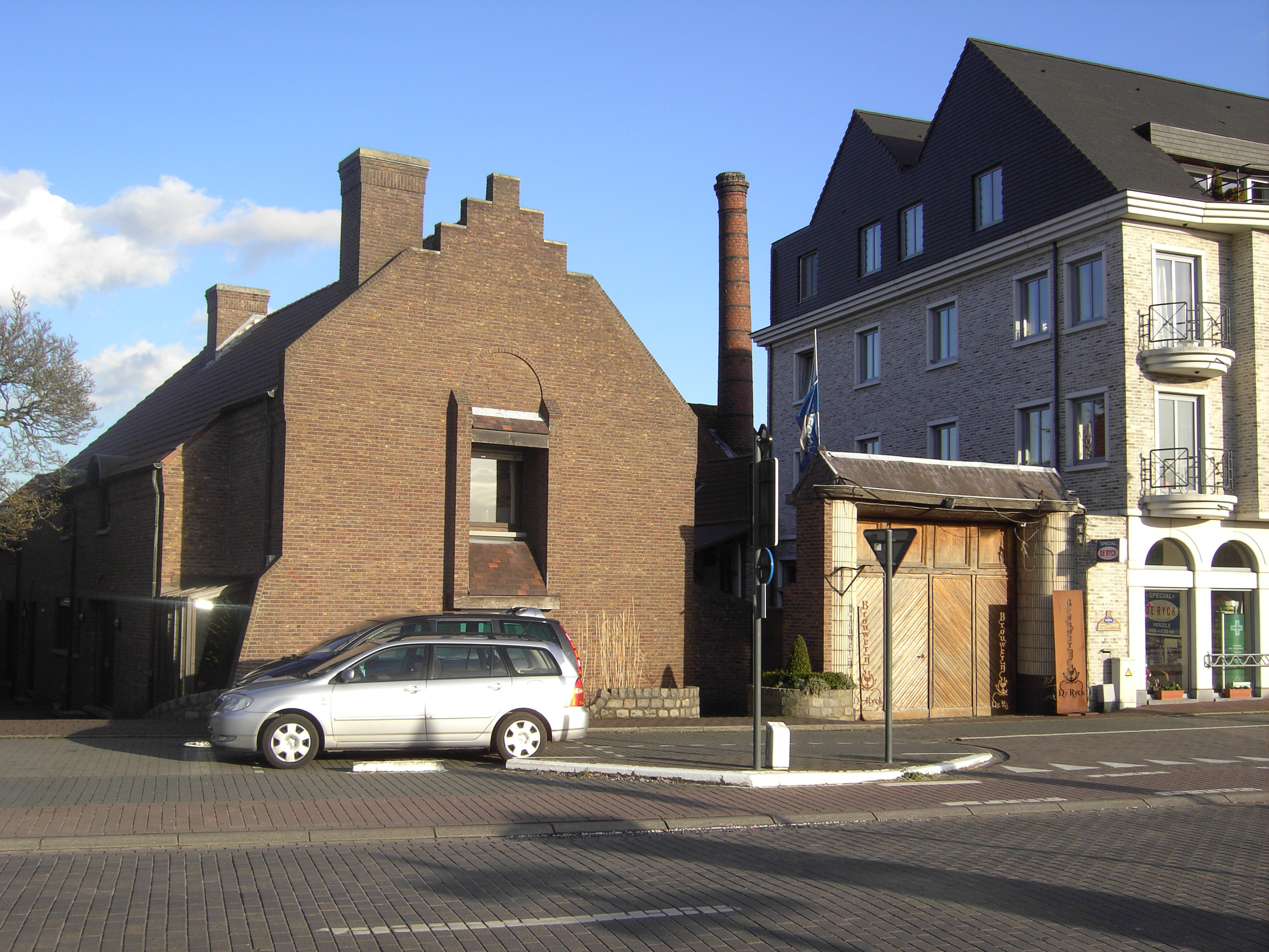
Herzele - Brouwerij De Ryck, Herzele

After graduation, An De Ryck completed an internship in Bavaria, working at several other facilities, before returning and taking over the brewing at the family brewery in the 1970s. She introduced six new flavors, and took the business from a local level to an international distributorship by adding a bottling facility. In addition to working as a masterbrewer at the De Ryck Brewery, De Ryck belongs to a consortium of thirty breweries and two universities which are studying beer. A recent project evaluated how quickly beer stales, as well as flavor stability.

An De Ryck's daughter, Miek Van Melkebeke and son, Bram Van Melkebeke now operate the commercial side of the brewery, while she continues as brewmaster. She produced nine beers most in the traditional style, but a few, like Jules de Bananes, flavored with banana, are sweet and fruity. In 2011, she added a tenth beer, creating a special beer, "Gouden Arend" (Golden Eagle) for the brewery's 125th birthday. An De Ryck has won multiple awards for her beers, including best Belgian tripel at the 2008 European Beer Star and the bronze medal from the World Beer Cup, in both 2006 and 2008. In 2013, her Arend Tripel won gold at the European Beer Star competition held in Munich, Germany.

An De Ryck's husband, Omer Van Melkebeke is a pharmacist.
