= Pink Boots Society =

Organization for women who work with fermented beverages

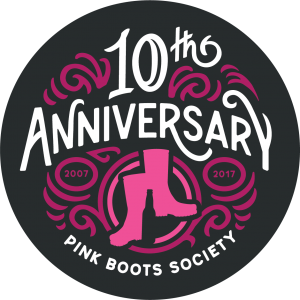
- Abbreviation: PBS
- Formation: 2007
- Founder: Teri Fahrendorf
- Type: Nonprofit
- Website: https://www.pinkbootssociety.org/

The Pink Boots Society (PBS) is a non-profit organization with international membership which supports women and non-binary people working in the fermented beverages and allied industries. PBS started with women beer professionals and expanded that definition as its members and the industry have evolved. The majority of its members are involved with craft beer. The organization helps women fermented beverage professionals advance their careers through educational opportunities. Sub goals include mentorship, networking with other women in the profession, and raising awareness of women in these male-dominated industries. PBS also helps teach the skills needed to become beer judges. PBS raises money for scholarships for women to continue their education in order to break through remaining glass ceilings. There are around 2,500 members across the world. All members must be women or non-binary and have some type of career in the fermented beverages industries, which includes beer, wine, spirits, cider, saki, kombucha, and any other fermented beverage.

== Organization history ==
The Pink Boots Society was founded during a 2007 cross-country trip taken by Teri Fahrendorf, which she documented on her blog "The Road Brewer." Fahrendorf had recently left her position as brewmaster at Steelhead Brewing Company in Eugene, Oregon, and wanted to visit the breweries of her professional peers and brew with them, meet more brewers, and visit her aging relatives.

Armed with a pair of pink rubber boots gifted to her by her mother-in-law, Fahrendorf set off for California and across to Maine in June 2007. Fahrendorf met a surprising number of women brewers, including Laura Ulrich, Carol Stoudt, and Whitney Thompson while on this road trip. She had not known of most of the women brewers she met, and they had also never heard of her.

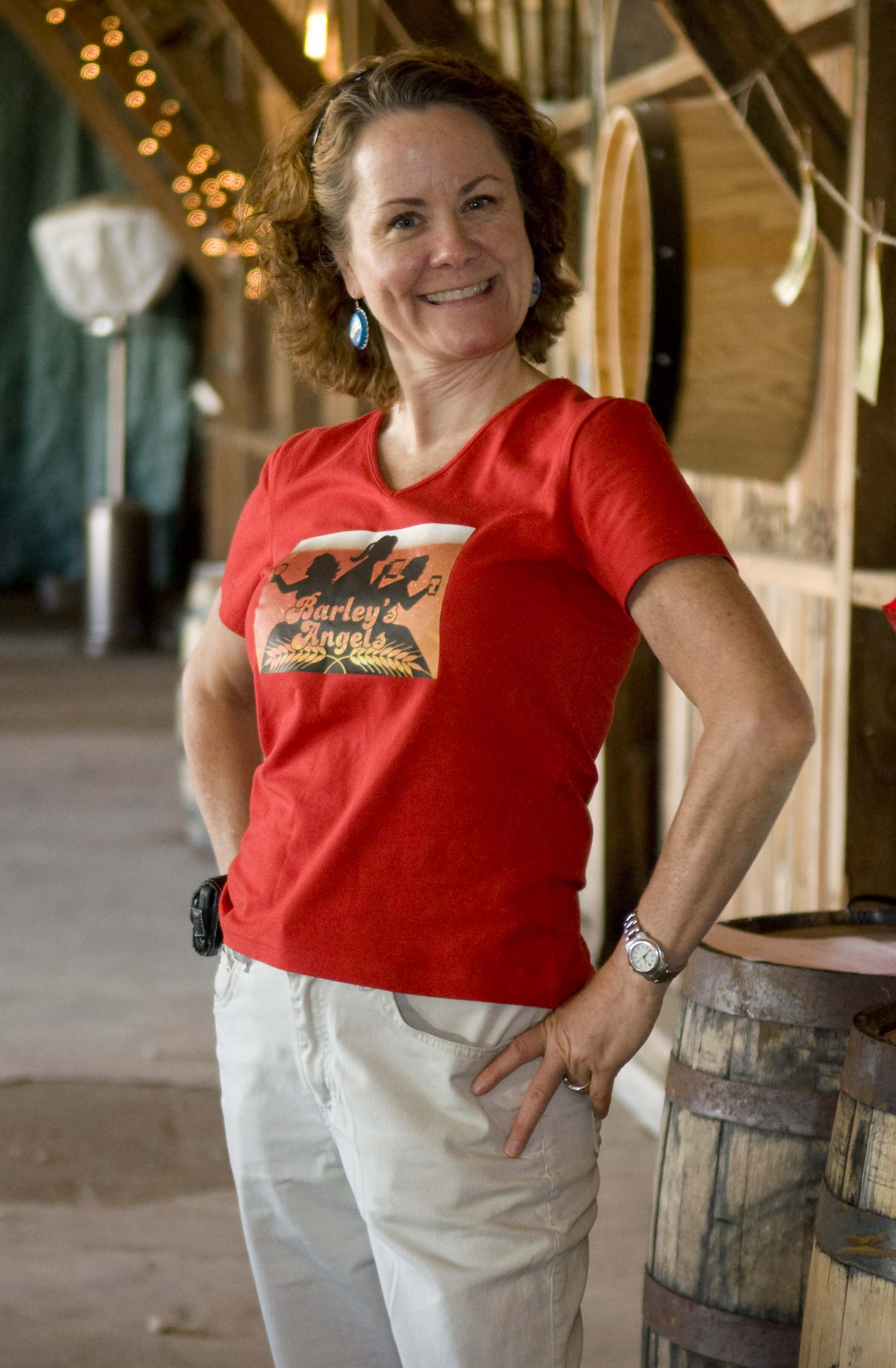
Teri Fahrendorf, founder of the Pink Boots Society at a Barley's Angels event, August 22, 2012, at the Rogue Hop Farm.

Meeting Laura Ulrich on June 16, 2007, became the founding date of what Fahrendorf named Pink Boots Society two months later, when she posted the original list of 60 women brewers on her blog. Fahrendorf visited 70 different breweries and participated in 38 brews on her "Road Brewer" trip. The young women brewers she met clearly wanted to connect with other women, so Fahrendorf was inspired to ask about, and try to meet, as many women brewers as possible during the trip. She documented every woman brewer she met or heard about, and that list was posted under the headline "Pink Boots Society" on August 5, 2007, on her website.

The first meeting of the Pink Boots Society occurred during the Craft Brewers Conference in 2008. This meeting was attended by 16 women brewers from the list, and 6 women beer writers. Male beer writers had asked to attend, but were told to "send a woman." It was important to the group to see what it felt like to be in a room filled with estrogen and not testosterone within the beer industry. Votes were taken and the 16 women brewers present voted to become an organization that stood for three things: Women. Beer. Professionals. Thus the 6 women beer writers instantly became new members. Later, the Pink Boots Society became a non-profit organization. Also later, the 3 definitions were expanded to include non-binary people, and all fermented beverages.

The original mission statement was "Pink Boots Society was created to Inspire, Encourage and Empower women beer professionals to advance their careers." The focus of education was added at the second Pink Boots Society meeting, attended by 35 members during the Great American Beer Festival in October 2008, where members voted to become a 501(c)3 charity to raise money for a scholarship program. Currently the mission statement is "The Pink Boots Society aims to assist, inspire and encourage women and non-binary individuals in the fermented/alcoholic beverage industry to advance their careers through education." Friendship, mentoring and networking are unofficial outcomes of women gathering together within Pink Boots Society's meetings and conferences. An industry goal of Pink Boots Society is to raise awareness of gender issues in the fermented beverages industries. The Pink Boots Society and its members have been involved in many major beer events, including the Great American Beer Festival, Craft Brewers' Conference, and World Brewing Conference. Over time, Pink Boots Society has also developed their own annual events, such as Big Boots Brew (now Collaboration Brew Day), Bring Mom Out for a Beer (on Mother's Day), and the North Carolina chapters' Biere de Femme Festival. In 2013, PBS was contacted by Sophie de Ronde to create the International Women's Collaboration Brew Day (IWCBD). The day helps raise awareness about women in the beer industry and also helps raise money for PBS.

In 2018, Yakima Chief Hops (YCH) created a special hop blend to benefit the Pink Boots Society. Proceeds from the Pink Boots Blend help fund the organization's scholarship fund. Working with its distribution partner, Country Malt Group, YCH contributed $117,807 this year; the program has raised over $257,000 for the Pink Boots Society since 2018. Pink Boots Society raises money for its scholarships each year, with the big push being March for Women's History Month, with many collaboration beers being brewed specifically on March 8, International Women's Day.

== Barley's Angels and consumer education ==
With the October 2008 vote to pursue education as a goal, Pink Boots Society tried to include consumer education as well as professional. To this effect, Fahrendorf and Lisa Morrison founded Barley's Angels as a subgroup of Pink Boots Society, hoping it would become a source of income for PBS as it encouraged women consumers to learn about beer through local Barley's Angels chapter meetings. Barley's Angels did take off with the rapid growth of chapters, but it did not achieve the fundraising goal and was a time distraction from Pink Boots Society's focus on its members. At the time PBS became a 501(c)3, the Board decision was made to spin off Barley's Angels as a separate entity. Christine Jump took over as President of Barley's Angels in 2012, and continues to run it today. Barley's Angels was modelled on the successful consumer group created by Left Hand Brewing Company, called "Ales-4-FemAles." At about the same time other women's beer consumer groups sprouted independently around the US, several utilizing the chapter model, including Girls Pint Out.

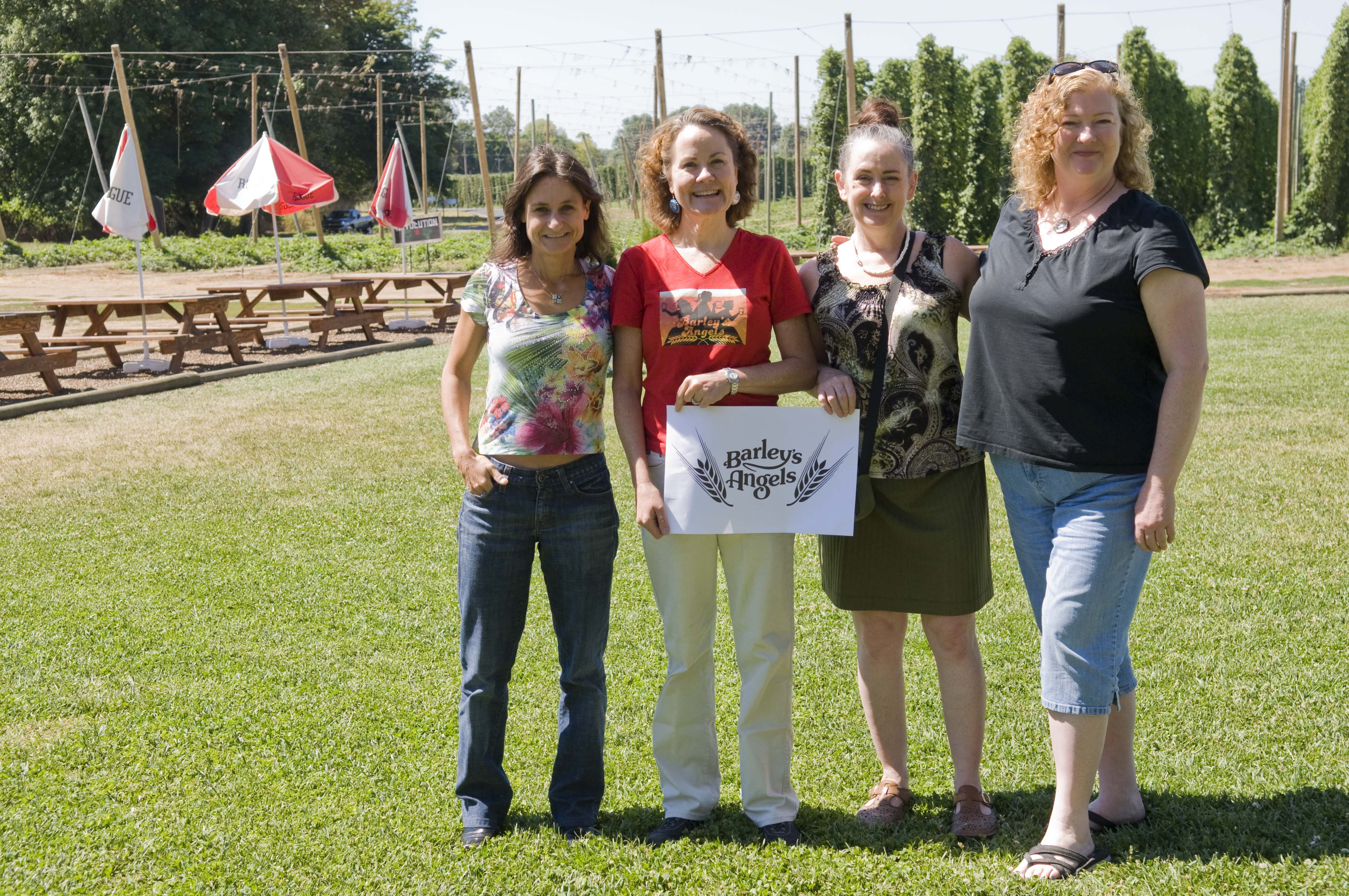
Barley's Angels Hop Farm Event

== Staff and volunteers ==
Emily Engdahl was Executive Director 2013–2018. Fahrendorf was President 2007–2016. Laura Ulrich was President 2016–2020. Jen Jordan was president in 2021. Ellen Sherrill was president in 2022. Blanca Quintero became president in 2023.

== Archival records ==
The Pink Boots Society's archival collections are housed in the Oregon Hops and Brewing Archives (OHBA) at Oregon State University. This collection helps document the creation, growth, administration, and members of the Pink Boots Society.
