= Apiwe Nxusani-Mawela =

South African brewmaster

Apiwe Nxusani-Mawela (b 1984) is a South African brewmaster. Nxusani-Mawela is the first person from South Africa to earn a National Diploma in clear fermented beverages. She is also the first black woman in South Africa to found a microbrewery. Her company, Brewsters Craft, introduces students to the science of beer making through training and provides professional breweries a service through beer quality testing. She helped organize International Women's Collaboration Brew Day (IWCBD) events in South Africa.

== Early life ==
Apiwe Nxusani was born in 1984 and grew up in Butterworth in the Eastern Cape. Her parents are school teachers; she is the middle of three children. She is married to Rudzani Mawela and they have two kids. She had an early interest in science, and though her parents wanted her to pursue medicine, she was more interested in Biology, Microbiology, and Biotechnology.

== Education ==
When she was in 11th grade, she visited an open day at the former Rand Afrikaans University and was intrigued by the science of beer making. She has a BSc degree from the University of Witwatersrand and an Honours in Microbiology from the University of Pretoria. In 2006, she joined South African Breweries (SABMiller) through the company’s graduate recruitment program; she completed an 18-month brewing internship. She completed both a Diploma in Brewing and the Master Brewer Diploma through the Institute of Brewing and Distilling. She was certified as a trainer for the Institute, becoming the first black African to be accredited. Nxusani-Mawela was also the first person in South Africa to complete the NQF6 National Diploma in Clear Fermented Beverages through FoodBev SETA. She earned a certification to judge beer from the Beer Judge Certification Program (based in the United States).

== Professional Brewing Work ==
She first experienced brewing at various family events where traditional beer, known as umqombothi, is often drunk, and began professionally brewing in 2007. Throughout her career, she has found ways to incorporate non-Western ingredients and techniques; reflecting on her work at SABMiller she said “I was busy mastering the art of Western brewing, while knowing nothing about what we as Africans have been brewing for generations." She enrolled at the University of South Africa (UNISA) where she participated in the short course “Thought Leadership for Africa’s Renewal," offered through the Thabo Mbeki African Leadership Institute (TMALI) in partnership with the Thabo Mbeki Foundation." The principal goal of TMALI is to "train Africans for the political, economic, social and cultural renewal of the African continent and its people."

Nxusani-Mawela worked at SABMiller for 8 years, working as brand brewer, brewery manager, project brewer, and craft brewer. She left in 2014 and partnered with Hoggshead to start Brewhogs Microbrewery in Kyalami, where she was brewmaster and co-owner. While at Brewhogs, she brewed a pilsner, a red lager, an India Pale Lager (IPL) and a black IPL. In 2017, she sold her shares at Brewhogs to focus on her own company, Brewsters Craft. While there she also made Loxton Lager, a lager brewed with honey, buchu, and fynbos herbs.

In 2015, she opened, Brewsters Craft, which provides training, quality analysis and consultant services to the South Africa brewing industry. The company’s academy is accredited by the FoodBev SETA to offer NQF3 brewing qualifications and internships; they are accredited by the Institute of Brewing and Distilling to offer training towards the General Certificate in Brewing and Diploma in Brewing. Brewsters Craft is based in Roodepoort, Johannesburg and is a 1000L contract brewing facility that offers accredited brewing training, quality testing services, and contract brewing. It is notable for being the first black female majority owned brewing company in South Africa. The first beer she brewed there was a sorghum pilsner, which had the traditional taste and feel of umqombothi, but without it being thick."

Brewsters Craft does contract manufacturing, but in 2019 launched own beer and cider brand, Tolokazi, which includes an alcohol-free beer. Tolokazi is Nxusani-Mawela's clan name, which she says "are like family names with more significance by the Xhosa people than a surname. Tolo is the clan name and women from that clan name are called Tolokazi." Tolokazi uses indigenous African ingredients: their pilsner uses sorghum, lager and African pale ale use South African hops, rooibos in the cider, and hibiscus in the non-alcoholic beer.

Nxusani-Mawela is involved more generally with the brewing profession as well. She is the Chairperson for the Institute of Brewing and Distilling, Africa Section and Distilling and the Beer Association of South Africa. She is on the Board of Directors for both the Craft Brewers Association of South Africa and African Manufacturers Association; and was Chairperson of the Board for the Beer Association of South Africa. Further, to educate her community about traditional beer making and raise awareness about the industry, Nxusani-Mawela gives talks at high schools. Through these key roles she has been able to advance brewing qualifications, especially for black women, across the African continent.

== Women in Brewing ==
Nxusani-Mawela is passionate about providing opportunities for women brewers in a male-dominated brewing industry. Reflecting on the role of women in brewing, Nxusani-Mawela said “The biggest stereotype is that brewing and beer are only for men. I am changing this notion by employing mainly women to help introduce more women into the industry.” Traditionally, up to the 18th century, beer was brewed primarily by women. "Like in any other industry, we need equal representation of women, she said, "we all face similar challenges [in opening a brewery] like licensing and funding. But for women, it’s more challenging because there are not as many women in the industry.” In 2020, Nxusani-Mawela noted that "[o]ur struggles today are paving a path for the next generation of women in our workspace, so they do not have to go through what we went or are going through ... One day, having women in male-dominated fields will be the norm."

She organized International Women's Collaboration Brew Day events and led the brewing process for the 2019 South African Breweries “Bold Brew” (also called Brewing the Bold) beer, which was a limited edition beer designed and brewed by women and released on International Women's Day. The beer’s ingredients were selected by a poll on the South African Breweries' social media pages and made by five women in the industry. Of this beer, Pranisha Maharaj (SAB & AB InBev’s Corporate Reputation Manager), said “We wanted to make a beer that embodied the characteristics of strong, independent women."
