= Teri Fahrendorf =

American brewer (b. 1960)

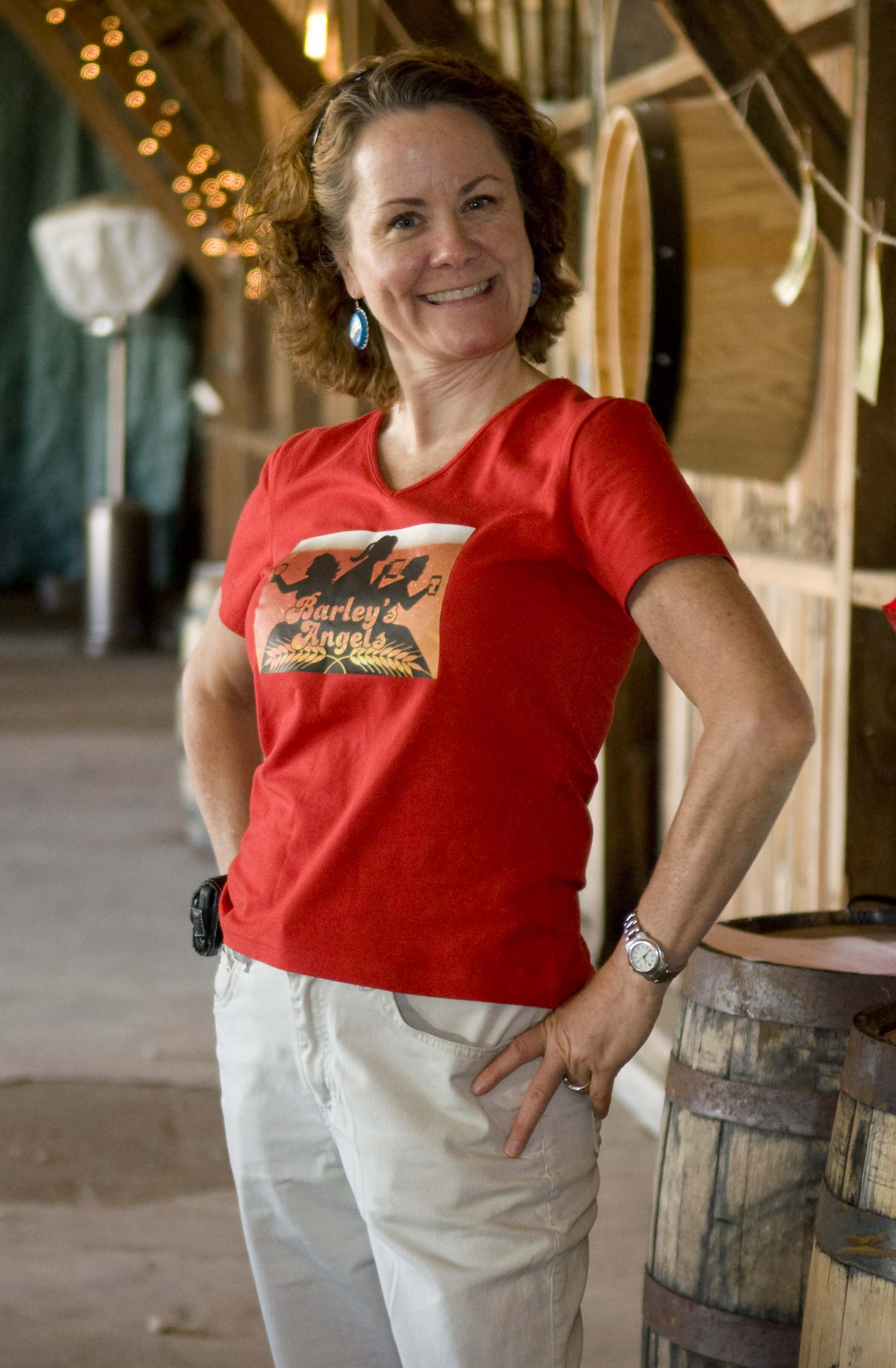
- Fahrendorft, at a Barley's Angel's event, August 22, 2012 at the Rogue Hop Farm
- Born: February 18, 1960 (age 66); West Bend, Wisconsin, U.S.
- Education: University of Wisconsin–Eau Claire (1984); Siebel Institute
- Occupations: Brewmaster and Manager at the Malt Innovation Center of Great Western Malting
- Known for: Brewing and Founding the Pink Boots Society
- Website: terifahrendorf.com

Teri Fahrendorf (born February 18, 1960) is an American brewer and founder of the Pink Boots Society, an organization that supports women in the brewing industry.

Fahrendorf was one of the first women to enter the craft brewing industry, and her brews have won awards from the Great American Beer Festival and the Brewer's Association, among others.

== Early life and education ==
Fahrendorf was raised in a German family in Wisconsin and is the oldest of four children. She began baking bread at the age of 10, which she credits as her first attempt at fermentation. While she was creative with cooking, Fahrendorf pursued a college degree at the University of Wisconsin at Eau Claire, studying Management Information Systems (business major with an emphasis on computers, COBOL programming); the project management skills she developed helped her later in her brewing career. During college years, a classmate's presentation on making wine sparked her interest; she used the “Balloon wine” method, combining Welch's grape juice concentrate, yeast, and sugar. Following her college graduation in 1984, she moved to the San Francisco Bay area to work at two Fortune 100 companies (Honeywell and Burroughs, which became Unisys) doing software services and software support. She continued homebrewing, but since wine in the area was cheap, in 1985 she turned to homebrewing beer instead. She joined a homebrewing club, the San Andreas Malts, where she learned the foundational ingredients and processes for beer brewing: malts, hops, yeast, and temperature. During this time, she also attended events such as the American Homebrewers Association Conference and the Great American Beer Festival.

== Early work as a brewmaster ==
In 1988, Fahrendorf quit her job as a computer programmer to attend the Siebel Institute in Chicago, where she earned a degree in Brewing Technology and worked at an internship at the Sieben River North Brewpub. Upon her return to California from Chicago, she began her career in brewing at the Golden Gate Brewing Company in Berkeley in March 1989. Golden Gate Brewing changed management prior to her hire and a variety of factors, such as improper layout, led to what Fahrendorf refers to as her "worst brewing experience". As she brewed 10 barrels in a 7 barrel system on May 1, 1989, she filled a kettle with 50 gallons of water to sterilize it and to later use to top off the kettle after mash-in. During the brewing process at Golden Gate, the design of the kettle required the brewmaster empty the kettle of its last 2-3 gallons when the pump drew air, cavitating loudly. On the day of the accident, Fahrendorf began her routine, and as she worked she heard the pump cavitating, marking the time to drain the remaining 2-3 gallons from the kettle. As she removed the tri-clamp to begin this process, 50 gallons of boiling water gushed out, filling Fahrendorf's left boot. The improper layout of the brewery left her with no clear escape route; however, she was able to duck between the bars on the railings and escape the boiling water, but not before there was severe damage done to her legs and feet, particularly her left side. The accident resulted in 3rd degree burns on 11% of her body, which required surgery and skin grafts from her scalp. Following her accident, Fahrendorf became an advocate for promoting safety in breweries and continues to include the story of the injury in her public talks or interviews. Fahrendorf left Golden Gate for a position at Triple Rock Brewing, also located in Berkeley, California, where she was the Head Brewer. In 1990, she attended the Oregon Brewers Fest, which led her to a job in Oregon at Steelhead Brewing.

== Work at Steelhead Brewing Company ==
After time spent at Triple Rock Brewing, Fahrendorf moved to Oregon when she took a job at Steelhead Brewing Company in Eugene, Oregon. Steelhead was the second craft brewery to open in Eugene, and Fahrendorf began work there on September 17, 1990. She became the Brewmaster, working for Steelhead for 17 years. Her alcoholic creations won awards, including a Bombay Bomber that had "near cult status" when she brewed it in Eugene and a Great American Beer Festival Silver Medal for "U.C.I.P.A.", but she was also known for creating the recipe for the company's well-regarded root beer. She recounts on her time spent at Steelhead through the 1990s, and notes of the large expansion of craft breweries that occurred on the west coast during this time. In her reflections on that time, she noted that although many brewers transferred to different breweries of worked in many different locations, she preferred to stay in Eugene. She credits this longevity with her survival during the craft brewery crash of the early 2000s.

== Road brewer ==
In 2007, Fahrendorf left her job at Steelhead Brewing Company to become what she termed as a "road brewer". She traveled from June 4 to October 20 and traveled across the United States from Oregon to Maine and back, a trip totaling 12,656 miles. During her trip, Fahrendorf visited a total of 70 breweries and brewed at 38 of them, forming connections with brewers across the country in the process. During her trip, Fahrendorf met female brewers who reported feelings of isolation as the only women working in the brewery; as a result, she recognized a need for an organization that would act as a community for women brewers to connect and share information, and collected the names of the women she met for the duration of her trip. That list formed the kernel of the Pink Boots Society.

== Founding of the Pink Boots Society and Barley's Angels ==
Fahrendorf is an advocate for other women and has worked to increase the number of women in the brewing industries. She created the Pink Boots Society (PBS) after traveling through the country as a Road Brewer. In her oral history interview, she claims there is no glass ceiling in brewing, with the exception of the brewery education system. She does recognize that the most difficult part of breaking into the industry had to do with her physical size since brewing is a very physical job. She credits Mellie Pullman as a large influence in her early career; Pullman the first female brewmaster in the United States after she started working at Park City, Utah's Schirf Brewing (later Wasatch Brewery) in 1986.

Using the connections she made on her trip, she organized the first meeting of the Pink Boots Society (so named after the pink rubber boots Fahrendorf wore while brewing on her trip) in San Diego in April 2008. This meeting included 16 brewers and 6 beer writers; these women decided Pink Boots Society should be a professional organization to support women involved in the brewing industry around the world. The second meeting of the Pink Boots Society was held in December 2008 and there were 35 attendees; the organization continued to grow and in 2017 had nearly 1,900 members. They are recognized as a 501(c)(3) nonprofit and currently focus on scholarship, education, and outreach for women in brewing. The archival material for the Pink Boots Society is held within the Oregon Hops and Brewing Archives in the Special Collections and Archives Research Center (SCARC) of Oregon State University (OSU).

Fahrendorf was also involved in Barley's Angels, an organization with chapters across the country which focuses on expanding the knowledge and appreciation of craft beer among women.

== Present day work ==
Since her road trip and creation of the Pink Boots Society, Fahrendorf continue to work in the craft brewing industry and her current position is as a Malt Innovation Center Manager for Great Western Malting. Her career accomplishments include the brewing eight of Steelhead's 24 award-winning beers for the Great American Beer Festival, being a published technical author and speaker, and receiving the Brewers Association 2014 Recognition Award.
