= Sigi Friedmann =

Sigi Friedmann (b 1961) owns Friedmann's Brewery (Brauerei Friedmann) in Gräfenberg, Bavaria, Germany. She was the youngest master brewer in Germany when she replaced her father managing their family brewery in 1982. She is a 4th generation brewmaster.

Friedmann was born in 1961 into a brewing family. The first mention of the brewery was in Gräfenberg's documents in 1875. She didn't intend to become a brewer, wanting to spend time with her family and travel. However, her father sent her to Munich to train to be a chemical and technical assistant to work in a laboratory; but without her knowledge, he had enrolled her to train to be a master brewer. She was a model student and performed better than most of her male colleagues in the exam. When she replaced her father in the company management in 1982, she was the youngest master brewer in Germany.

Friedmann runs a brewery that is modern and environmentally sustainable; she installed an automatic filling, environmentally friendly cleaning system, and rebuilt the brewhouse. The delivery area for the brewery is 30 kilometers around the city of Gräfenberg. The beers produced by Friedmann's Brewery includes the "Ritter Wirnt Trunk", a beer specialty named after a character from the history of Gräfenberg; a popular Festbier, an uncharacteristic Pils, and "Sigis Lager." Their beer has won a European Beer Star Award.

She plans to pass the business to her daughter, Barbara, who studied brewing and beverage technology in Weihenstephan. Presently, Barbara Friedmann-Merkel is a brewer and managing director at the brewery.
