= Carol Stoudt =

American brewmaster (born 1950)

Carol Stoudt (born 1950) is an American brewmaster who founded Stoudts Brewing Company in Adamstown, Pennsylvania in 1987. In addition to owning the company, she was the brewmaster, salesperson, and mentor. She was one of the first female brewmasters since Prohibition in the United States and the nation's first female sole proprietor of a brewery in 1987.

== Pre-brewing ==
Stoudt was born in 1950 and grew up in a teetotaling family. She was a kindergarten teacher, has a master's in early childhood education, and was a negotiator for her teachers union. She married Ed Stoudt in 1975 and they have five children.

== Brewing career ==
Carol Stoudt's husband Ed opened the Kountry Kitchen, which specialized in Pennsylvania Dutch food, in October 1962. After a few years, he converted the business to The Black Angus, specializing in prime cuts of beef, and concurrently opened the space to antique dealers in 1971. Carol joined the business after she and Ed were married. There was a fire in 1977, and after the business reopened the Stoudts added a European beer garden. They wanted to serve their own beer, but brewpubs were not legal in Pennsylvania until 1989, and a married couple could not legally own a restaurant and brewery.

Carol Stoudt became enamored with beer during her 1975 honeymoon in Germany; a pilsner at Augustiner-Bräu was the beer that sparked her imagination. She founded Stoudts Brewing Company in 1987 on the grounds of Black Angus Restaurant and Pub and was the sole proprietor. Stoudt was not a homebrewer and knew little about making beer, though she had a background in chemistry and microbiology. She attended the Siebel Institute and had Karl Strauss and Greg Noonan as mentors. The brewery meant adding a 30-barrel brewhouse to an already thriving business; an on-premise bakery and cheesemaking facility would follow.

Her brewery's first beer was Stoudts Gold Lager. "Stoudt’s beers are made solely with spring water and the finest barley, hops and brewers yeast, to provide an all-natural product with no preservatives and are brewed in accordance with the Bavarian Purity Law of 1516." "Originally they used a vintage 1902 bottler combined with a hand labeler that for years sat in a museum and had been stored in an old barn. The filler just happened to fit champagne bottles which became a virtual trademark of Stoudt's beers. Those original green bottles have been replaced with brown to better protect the beer." At the time, it was Pennsylvania's first “microbrewery” and one of just 73 breweries in the country. They founded a local Oktoberfest celebration in 1979.

== Awards and recognition ==
Stoudt won four medals at the 1992 Great American Beer Festival: gold medals in the Märzen/Oktoberfest and the Helles/Dortmunder categories, silver medals in the Helles/Dortmunder and Bock categories. The brewery has won more than 20 prizes from the Great American Beer Festival, the country's top brewing competition. She also earned a gold (1996) and bronze (1998) at the World Beer Cup International Competition, as well as several World Beer Championship awards.

In 2018, Stoudt was the first recipient of the Presidential Award given by state trade group Breweries in Pennsylvania (BOP). They gave it to her “in recognition of and appreciation for outstanding achievement and extraordinary contributions to the Pennsylvania Craft Beer Industry” and BOP president Chris Lampe noted that she “has been an industry trailblazer for over three decades and has had a significant influence on women getting into the craft beer business. Every Pennsylvania brewer can find her persistence, dedication, talent, and longevity inspiring.”

== Retirement ==
Stoudt retired in spring 2020 and ceased brewing operations at her namesake brewery.
