= Siebel Institute =

College in Illinois, United States

Siebel Institute of Technology
- Type: For-profit, Unaccredited Trade school
- Established: 1868
- Location: Chicago, Illinois, United States
- Campus: Urban
- Campus locations: Chicago; Munich; Online
- Website: siebelinstitute.com

The Siebel Institute of Technology is a for-profit trade school located in Chicago that focuses on brewing science. The school is the oldest brewing school located in the United States and has been in operation since its founding in 1868 by German immigrant chemist John Ewald Siebel (1845–1919). Prior to immigrating to the United States in 1866, Siebel earned his doctorate in chemistry from the University of Berlin Originally named the Zymotechnic Institute, the school was renamed after its founder in 1872. During Prohibition, the institute diversified by adding courses in baking, refrigeration, engineering, milling, carbonated beverages and related topics; after the repeal of Prohibition, courses not concerned with brewing were discontinued.

In 2013 the institute was moved to the Kendall College’s building, and subsequently moved to 322 S. Green St. in Chicago in 2019. Through its affiliation with Doemens Academy under the World Brewing Academy partnership, brewing programs are also conducted in Munich, Germany.

In January 2026, the institute will move to Montreal. It stated that the reason for the move was due to international students, who became the majority of the school's student body, were having difficulties to acquire visas to study in United States. The institute also plans to open a baking academy at the Montreal location.

== Notable alumni ==
- Joseph F. Fanta (1914–1988), Illinois state representative
- Teri Fahrendorf (born 1960), American brewer and founder of the Pink Boots Society
- Dan Carey, Master Brewer at New Glarus Brewing Company
- August Anheuser Busch III, former President of the Anheuser-Busch Companies, Inc. (ABC)
- John W. Stroh Jr., Stroh Brewing Company
- August Pabst, Pabst Brewing Company
- Gregory Hall, Brewmaster, Goose Island Brewing Company
- John Mallett, VP - Operations, Bell's Brewery
- John W. Stroh III, Stroh Brewing Company
- Ray Daniels, Founder of the Cicerone certification program
- Gari M. Stroh III, Stroh Brewery Company
- Tonya Cornett, 2024 Russell Schehrer Award for Innovation in Craft Brewing
