= Stoudt's Brewery =

Microbrewery and restaurant in Pennsylvania, US

- Interactive map of Stoudt's Brewery
- Location: Adamstown, Pennsylvania, US
- Coordinates: 40.2384°N 76.0727°W
- Opened: 1987
- Closed: 2020
- Owner: Stoudt's Brewing Company
- Website: http://www.stoudtsbeer.com/

Inactive beers
Name	Type
Pils	Pilsener
Gold Lager	Lager
American Pale Ale	Ale
Scarlet Lady Ale	Ale
Triple	Abbey Ale
Double IPA	Ale
Fat Dog Stout	Stout
Weizen	Wheat
Oktoberfest	Lager
Pumpkinfest	Pumpkin Ale
Winter Ale	Ale
Blonde Double MaiBock	Lager

Stoudt's Brewery was a microbrewery and restaurant located in the Lancaster County borough of Adamstown. It was one of the commonwealth's first microbreweries, having been started in 1987 by Ed and Carol Stoudt. The brewery closed in 2020, after Carol Stoudt's retirement. Their restaurant, Stoudt's Black Angus Restaurant and Pub, closed the following year after more than 50 years of operation.

== Beers ==
Beers regularly available at Stoudt's Brewery included a pils, a Munich-style pale lager, an American pale ale, and "Scarlet Lady Ale", an English-style ale. Heavier offerings included "Triple", a Belgian-abbey style ale, an American-style double IPA, and Fat Dog Stout, a British-style stout. Stoudt's also offered seasonal beers.

In 2022, Philadelphia based brewery Evil Genius Beer Company partnered with Stoudt's to rerelease Stoudt's beer throughout Pennsylvania through 2023.
