= Rosa Merckx =

Rosa Merckx (15 June 1924 - 16 May 2023) was the first official female brewmaster and operations director in Belgium. She began work at the Liefmans Oudenaarde brewery in 1946 and took over as brewmaster in 1972.

In 2016, UNESCO recognized the historic significance of Belgian beer culture, adding it to their list of intangible cultural heritage of humanity. Brouwerij Liefmans, Oudenaarde in East Flanders was founded in 1679.

== Early life ==
As a girl growing up in Belgium in the 1940s, Merckx took English and drama lessons, did classical dance, volunteered at the Red Cross, played basketball, and was the first woman in her town to drive a car. She was also trilingual, speaking French, Dutch, and English, which was rare.

== Work in brewing ==
It was this language ability that got her the job at the brewery. In 1946, Paul Van Gheluwe, owner of the Liefmans brewery, was in need of a trilingual secretary. He knew of Merckx and visited her house to gauge her interest; he offered her the job and she accepted. It turned out that Merckx had a particular talent for tasting beer; taking her advice, Liefmans took on a milder taste.

Her work ethic and passion for brewing resulted in a larger role in beer production; she began taking wort density measurements, fermentations temperatures, and tasting, but eventually began brewing with her boss. Van Gheluwe asked her to taste the Liefmans Goudenband and she told him it was much too sour. So she reworked the recipe for Liefmans Goudenband, turning it into a fairly sweet red-brown beer. She said "I realized that the men were no longer the only ones who ended up at the cafe, there were also young people and women. It was also the time of Coca-Cola. It was therefore necessary to have a beer that could satisfy all palates."

Another example of her influence is the renaming of the beer Azenband to Goudenband. In 1956–1957, the original name for Liefmans brown ale "Azenband" was contested after another Belgian brewery registered a patent on the name Azenband, and subsequently threatened the Liefmans with a lawsuit and perpetual payment for every bottle of Azenband sold. "Azenband" means "the iron rings," evocative of the rings or hoops around wood barrels, and Merckx suggested "Golden Ring" (Goudenband) was a more appropriate name. Van Gheluwe agreed and took the legal steps to secure the name. The brewer that owned the name Azenband went out of business.

When Van Gheluwe died in 1972, his family asked her to take over. She held that top leadership position until 1990 when it was purchased by Riva, an ownership that lasted until 2002 when the brewery went broke; it was revived in 2008 by Duvel-Moortgat. She said that the day that Liefmans was taken over by Duvel Moortgat was "one of the happiest of my life" and she was happy to see the increase in international distribution.

When she became brewmaster, she also worked to create exportation avenues for Liefmans. Under her direction, Kriek style beer became an international success story. She was also instrumental in the spread of the Kriek style to the United States; reportedly selling to American women, who had traditionally been targeted by the "Lite" beer market.

Reflecting on her work in the brewery, Merckx said "Beer is a live product. It has a soul. I would not have been able to continue working for such a long time with a soulless product or in an admin office." https://belgium.beertourism.com/about-beer/women-and-beer Her signature still adorns the silk wrappers enveloping bottles of Liefmans Goudenband and Cuvée Brut.

Merckx still lived next to the Liefmans Brewery.

== Recognition ==
Apero Global is an event organized every year on International Women's Day by Sofie Vanrafelghem. She noted that "Rosa has opened the door for many female beer lovers. For me she has always been an important source of inspiration and a great example. She has certainly lowered the threshold for other women who like to pursue their passion in a man's world like the beer sector." Brewery Ommegang also named a Rosetta beer for her.
