= Wari women brewers =

Part of Peruvian history

On the Cerro Baúl mesa, in the central highlands of Peru, elite women from the Wari Empire made a drink called chicha in the years before 600 AD.

== Chicha ==
Chicha is a drink made of fermented grains and fruit products, and for this group, the drink was made from corn flavoured with a small Peruvian pepper berry. For brewers on the Cerro Baúl mesa "Corn and Peruvian pepper-tree berries were used to make the beer, which was drunk from elaborate beakers up to half a gallon in volume."

== The brewery ==
The brewery, which was located on a mountaintop, produced hundreds of gallons of chicha de mole beer every week; it was consumed on a daily basis and as a part of trade negotiations, celebrations, marriages, and funerals. "Around A.D. 1000, the Wari ritualistically abandoned the mesa-top fortress in the Moquega river basin. They brewed one last batch of chicha and drained it before smashing the keros (ceremonial drinking mugs) and setting fire to the brewery, the last building to be torched."

== Women brewers ==
Most modern chicha brewers are women, but women like the aclla cuna, Inca's chosen women, also brewed in the past. Accounts from Spanish conquerors in the 15th century described Incan women as master brewers and weavers; the Incans were a successor culture of the Wari. "Historical accounts relate that Inka chicha was brewed by the chosen women or aqlla who were given in service as part of the tribute payments of conquered polities." Chicha was also an important element in local community rituals and the discovery of brewing and serving vessels among common household possessions showed that families produced chicha as a daily beverage. Because there are parallels between the practiced of the better-known Incas and the earlier Waris, "it is very likely that maize beer production during Wari times was already an activity carried out by women, who more than likely were the predecessor of the aqllas." An archaeological discovery of a 1,000-year-old brewing facility from the Wari empire, which predates the Incas, showed that women played a crucial role in ancient Andean societies and the Cerro Baúl mesa brewery was staffed by elite women.

Researchers found several elegant metal tupu shawl pins in the brewery; pins were not found in other parts in the city. These pins, which look like long needles with flattened heads, likely belonged to the most privileged Wari women. Donna Nash noted these women "weren't slaves, and they weren't people of low status ... the fact that they made the beer probably made it even more special." Young women were trained in the facilities; this included minding the brewing, but also "using a drop spindle to create very fine thread [that] may have gone into weaving fine, gauzy cotton cloths for straining the dregs from the chicha." Researchers further concluded from the complexity of the brewery, which had spaces for grinding, cooking, and fermenting beer, that the Baúl brewery was the "largest specialized chicha production facility known for its time, and numerous shawl pins implicate a staff of elite women."
