= Josephine Uwineza =

Rwandan entrepreneur and social activist

Josephine "Fina" Uwineza
- Born: 1964 (age 61–62); Rwanda
- Occupation: Entrepreneur

Josephine "Fina" Uwineza (born 1964) is a Rwandan entrepreneur and social activist.

== Early life ==
Uwineza was born in 1964 to a family with five other siblings. In 1974, her father was assassinated during the 1973 Rwandan coup d'état which led Fina's mother into exile from Rwanda with all of her children in tow. The Uwineza family went to a few neighboring countries where other exiled family members had been staying but eventually ended up in Canada. Uwineza later returned to Rwanda in 1998 to provide aid to the nation following the Rwandan genocide which led to a large chunk of the population dead and the nation in shambles.

== Career ==
Upon returning to Rwanda with her husband and child, Uwineza managed a Chinese restaurant, Flamingo, within the city of Kigali. She managed the restaurant for 13 years before deciding to close it down in 2015 after deciding that she wasn't getting enough satisfaction from the business and wanted to spend more time with her family. Following the closing of Flamingo, Uwineza became a member of the Peace Through Business program held by the Institute for Economic Empowerment of Women which targets women in the countries of Rwanda and Afghanistan who are starting their own businesses. Through the Peace Through Business program, Uwineza met Nancy Coldham, a consultant who aids in the financial pursuits of women in low-income nations. Uwineza had the beginnings of an idea to open a new business within Kigali which Coldham encouraged and even helped instigate by helping Uwineza find an outside source for help with this start-up.

Coldham found help in the form of Beau's All Natural Brewing Company, a brewing company in Ontario, Canada. Beau's had interest in providing resources and training to someone who wanted to start their own brewery, which Uwineza could take advantage of. A team of leads from Beau's visited Rwanda in 2016 to assess the situation firsthand, which ultimately led to agreeing to aid Uwineza with her start-up. Following the visit from Beau's, Uwineza and her newfound friends in Beau's launched a Kickstarter campaign to raise funding for the brewery, citing the importance of a brewery within Rwanda as well as the business plan for the brewery to be owned and operate entirely by women. The Kickstarter campaign raised over CAD $95,000 with over 1,000 backers.

== Rwanda Brewery ==
Uwineza's brewery, planned to open in 2018, will feature a staff composed entirely of women from areas surrounding Kigali. The brewery will make use of ingredients that are sourced mostly from Rwanda. The main ingredients for the majority of the brews that will be produced include banana and sorghum which are popular ingredients to use within African brews. Uwineza hopes that the implementation of Rwanda's first microbrewery will be a positive step for the country as a whole since Rwanda enjoys the consumption of beer and being able to have a locally produced microbrew will be a source of unifying strength for the nation.
