= Oregon Hops and Brewing Archives =

Coordinates: 44°33′54.2″N 123°16′33.8″W

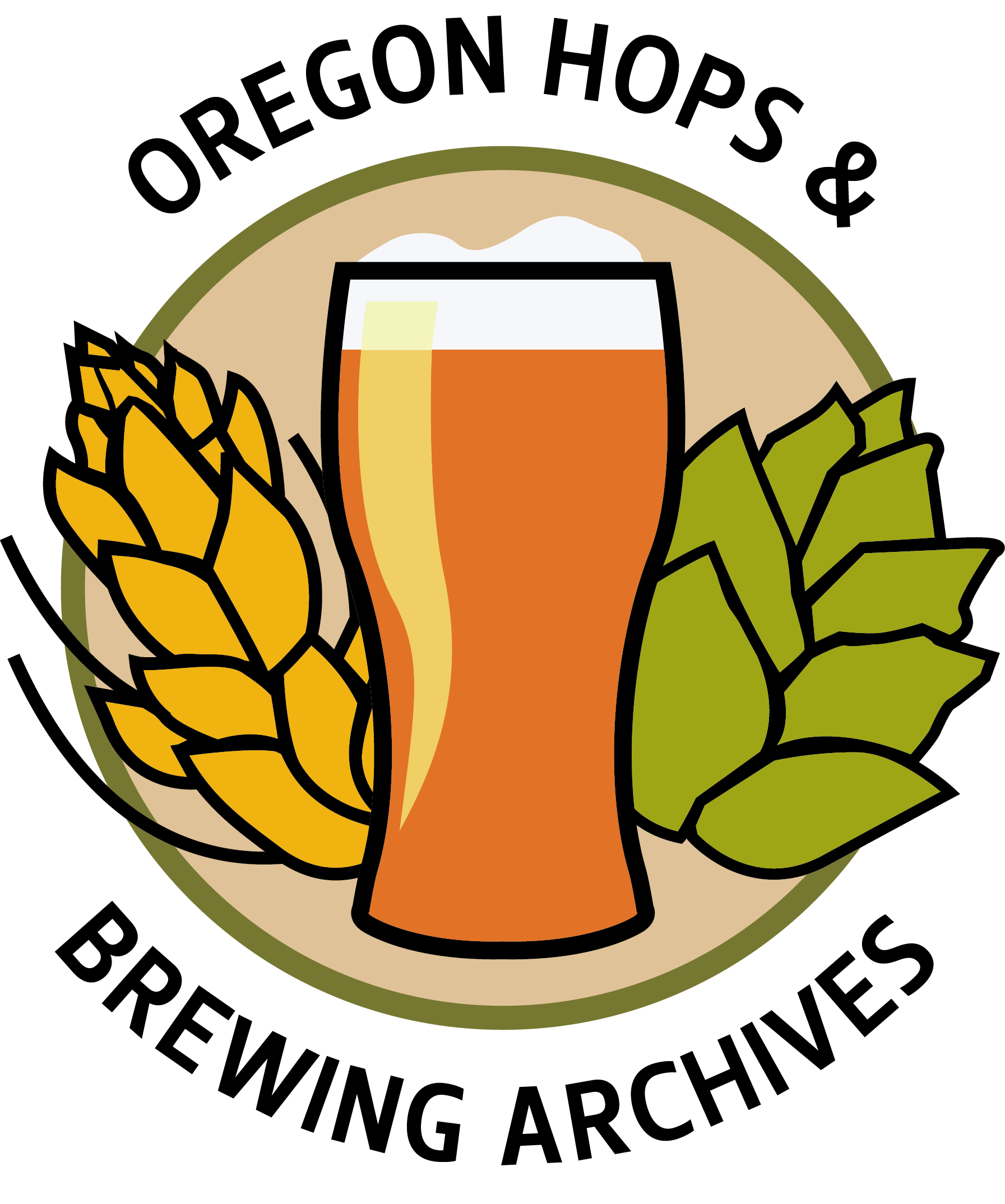

The Oregon Hops and Brewing Archives (OHBA), established in 2013, is a community archive in the United States dedicated to collecting, preserving, and sharing materials about the story of Northwest hops and brewing.

== Background ==
The Oregon Hops and Brewing Archives are unique in that it intertwines the history of hops and beer, as well as uniting and contextualizing the social and cultural aspects of brewing. They focus on materials related to the regional hops and barley farming, craft and home brewing, cider, mead, and the Oregon State University (OSU) research on hops and brewing that dates to the 1890s. Housed at OSU's Special Collections and Archives Research Center (SCARC) in Corvallis, OHBA contains the archives of brewers and breweries from the Pacific Northwest, as well as an extensive oral history collection. The physical and digital collections are curated by Tiah Edmunson-Morton and serve not only as a collecting initiative, but also as an educational initiative to encourage people to preserve their ongoing work. Edmunson-Morton argues that people underestimate the importance of what they've created, especially craft brewers, when in reality they are contributing to the history of American beer.

Oregon State University (OSU) began planting and experimenting with hops as early as 1893. Alfred Haunold influenced modern and popular hop varieties through his work with food studies. The Fermentation Science Program established itself in 1995 and further aided the study of hops and brewing at Oregon State, followed by the creation of the Oregon Hops and Brewing Archives in 2013.

== Methods ==
OHBA is a community archive, and its collections come from donations. These donations include a variety of items, from beer lists and promotional posters to business records and photographs. Digitized collections also make up a portion of OHBA, whether it be the collections themselves or publications about hops and brewing. Community archiving makes up a large part of OHBA and works to keep the archive local to the Pacific Northwest. Archivists work with these local hops and brewing communities to document their work and experiences. Materials of interest include technical and legal documents, press releases, marketing materials, recipes, as well as practice and production methods. Additional collecting items include information related to figures in the brewing industry such as biographical information, and OHBA conducts many oral history interviews with members of the local hops and brewing community.

== Hops and Brewing Publications and Newsletters ==
Various Hops and Brewing Publications and Newsletters are all housed within the OHBA archives and Oregon State University Library and cover a span from 1895 to present. The contents range from notable brewing publications, to technical information and reputable books on the subject. Some notable highlights from the Brewing Publication Collections include All About Beer (issues from 1979 to 2014), Oregon Beer Growler (issued from 2010–present), and American Brewer (issues from 1957 to 2013). OHBA also houses hop publications, which vary from the Oregon Hop Grower and The Pacific Hop Grower (issues from 1933 to 1940) to The Hopper (issues from 1945 to 1954).

== Collections ==
The Oregon Hops and Brewing Archives contains the collections of over 45 people and organizations. Aside from personal collections and papers, OHBA contains oral histories as well as hops and brewing newsletters and publications.

=== People, businesses, and groups ===
Some notable people represented through the OHBA collections include: Fred Eckhardt, homebrewer and pioneer in the field of beer journalism, Godfrey R. Hoerner, a specialist in hop production, and Pete Dunlop, author of Portland Beer: Crafting the Road to Beervana. Furthermore, OHBA's collections include that of notable businesses in Pacific Northwest Brewing. These include the records of Barley's Angel's, an organization dedicated to helping women in craft brewing by establishing chapters across the country, and the records of the Hop Growers of America Records, which is an organization founded with the purpose of increasing and improving knowledge on hops. The Oregon Hops and Brewing Archives contain collections of noteworthy brewing organizations from Oregon. These include archival material from McMenamins Brewery Collection, Ninkasi Brewing Company Collection, and the Zoller Hop Company Records.

=== Oral histories ===
The oral histories are a unique aspect of OHBA's archival collections is its extensive collection of oral history interviews, conducted from 2014 to 2019. Some notable interviews from each year has been included.

==== 2014 ====
- Teri Fahrendorf: One of the first female brewers in the Pacific Northwest
- Dr. Alfred Haunold: released the Cascade, Willamette, Sterling, Liberty, Mt. Hood, and Santiam hop varieties in the Willamette Valley while working with the USDA/ARS
- Blake Crosby: Fifth generation hop grower and owner of Crosby Hop Farm, alongside his father Kevin
- Fred Eckhardt: Prominent beer writer and critic based in the Pacific Northwest

==== 2015 ====
- Jeff Edgerton: Master Brewer at BridgePort Brewing Company
- Larry Sidor: Founder and brewmaster at Crux Fermentation Project
- Irene Firmat: Founder and CEO of Full Sail Brewing Company

==== 2016 ====
- Theodore "Ted" Cox: Founder and Owner of Old World Deli in Corvallis, housing the Oregon Trail Brewer
- Natalie Baldwin: Brewer at Burnside Brewing
- Dana Garves: Brewing chemist and owner/operator of BrewLab
- Lee Hedgmon: Portland based home and commercial brewer, as well as an advocate for women in brewing

==== 2017 ====
Oral histories from 2017 encompass people such as:

- Karl Ockert: Director of Brewery Operations at Deschutes Brewery
- Denny Conn: Homebrewer, author, and podcaster
- Mark McKay: Sixth generation hop grower in St. Paul, Oregon
- Veronica Vega: Brewmaster at Deschutes Brewery

==== 2018 ====
Notable interviews from 2018 include:

- Tim Gossack: Production Manager at Bell's Brewery
- Tony Lawrence: Co-founder and Brewmaster at Boneyard Brewery
- Lucy Burningham: author on topics of food, drink, and travel

==== 2019 ====
So far in 2019, oral histories have been conducted with figures such as:

- Walter Schuerle, a retired brewmaster and microbrewery consultant
- Jeff Alworth, a beer writer and podcaster based in Portland, Oregon

== See also ==
- Fermentation
- Oregon wine
- Zymology
