= List of food days =

This is a list of food days by country. Many countries have designated specific days as celebrations, commemorations, or acknowledgments of certain types of food and drink.

== Global or international ==
Date	Event	Origin	Notes	Image
52 days before Easter	Fat Thursday			
47 days before Easter	Shrove Tuesday (Pancake Day)	Medieval, United Kingdom		
March 8	International Women's Collaboration Brew Day	2013		
March 14	Pi Day	1988 at San Francisco Exploratorium. March 14th is written 3/14 in Month/Day format which looks like the first three digits of Pi: 3.14.		
March 28	International Saucisson's Day			
March 30	World Idli Day	2016		Idli Sambar
April 17	Malbec World Day	2011		
May 13	International Hummus Day	2012, in Egypt		
May 21	International Tea Day	2005 originally Dec 15th, 2019 U.N. declared on May 21		
June 1	World Milk Day	2001, Food and Agriculture Organization of the United Nations		
July 7	World Chocolate Day			
July 21	International Lamington Day			
July 22	Pi Approximation Day		(22/7 in the day/month date format)	
July 23	Chocolate and Peanut Butter Day	2013		
First Friday of August	International Beer Day	2007		
October 1	International Coffee Day	2015		
October 1	World Sake Day	2007		
October 1	World Vegetarian Day	1977, North American Vegetarian Society		
October 10	World Porridge Day	2009		
October 16	World Food Day	1945, Food and Agriculture Organization of the United Nations		
October 24	World Tripe Day	2013, Tripe Marketing Board		
November 18	World Egg Day	International Egg Commission		

== Africa ==
Date	Event	Origin	Notes	Image
October 31	Africa Day for Food and Nutrition Security			

== Brazil ==
Date	Event	Origin	Notes	Image
February 3	National Carrot Cake Day			
March 21	Pão Francês Day			
July 10	Pizza Day			
September 10	Brigadeiro Day			
September 13	Cachaça Day			

== Canada ==
Date	Event	Origin	Notes
Varies; 2023 date is February 9	Food Freedom Day	Canadian Federation of Agriculture	
February 23	Jamaican Patty Day	Toronto, Canada	
Saturday of Civic Holiday weekend (August)	Food Day Canada	Anita Stewart	

== Georgia ==
Date	Event	Origin	Notes	Image
February 27	National Khachapuri Day	2020 Intangible cultural heritage of Georgia		

== Germany ==
Date	Event	Origin	Notes	Image
November 19	National Soup Day	Pictured is Hochzeitssuppe, a German soup.		

== Iceland ==
Date	Event	Origin	Notes	Image
Two days before Lent	Bolludagur, also known as Cream bun or Cream puff day	Other regions in Scandinavia		
March 1	Beer Day		Beer was banned for decades in Iceland, but allowed again on March 1, 1989.	

== India ==
Date	Event	Origin	Notes	Image
November 26	National Milk Day	India		

== Japan ==
Date	Event	Origin	Notes	Image
November 11	Pocky Day	Ezaki Glico, 1999. Pictured are sticks of original-type Pocky.		

== Korea ==
Date	Event	Origin	Notes	Image
April 18	Black Day	A single people's day celebrated with jajangmyeon, the black noodle dish which gave the day its name.		
November 11	Pepero Day	Begun in 1994, this is an observance in South Korea similar to Valentine's Day, but held on November 11. The original purpose of the day was to exchange peperos with each other in hopes of becoming taller and thinner. The current purpose is to exchange peperos to show affection for friends and loved ones. Pictured are pepero almond sticks.		

== Luxembourg ==
Date	Event	Origin	Notes
Fourth Sunday in Lent	Pretzel Sunday (Bretzelsonndeg)		

== Netherlands ==
Date	Event	Origin	Notes	Image
Tuesday before Ash Wednesday	National Pancake Day (Nationale Pannenkoekdag)			

== Sweden ==
Date	Event	Origin	Notes	Image
March 25	National Waffle Day (Våffeldagen)	Celebrated on Our Lady Day. In Swedish that is "Vårfrudagen", and it sounds like "Våffeldagen", meaning Waffle day. Celebrations with waffles have been documented since the 19th century.		
October 4	National Cinnamon Bun Day (Kanelbullens dag)	Created in 1999 on initiative of Swedish lobbyists "Hembakningsrådet", i.e. approximately "Home Baking Counsel". The organisation started 1959 working for yeast, sugar, flour and margarine manufacturers and later for Nordzucker.		

== Turkmenistan ==
Date	Event	Origin	Notes	Image
Second Sunday in August	Melon Day			

== United Kingdom ==
Date	Event	Origin	Notes	Image
April 21	National Tea Day	Tea Houses across the UK participate by offering discounts and special promotions on afternoon and cream tea		
June 3	National Fish and Chips Day			
June 15	National Beer Day			
August 27	National Burger Day	Restaurants across the UK participate in the day by offering discounts on burgers.		

== United States ==
As of 2014, the United States had over 365 days related to awareness of specific foods or drinks.

=== January ===
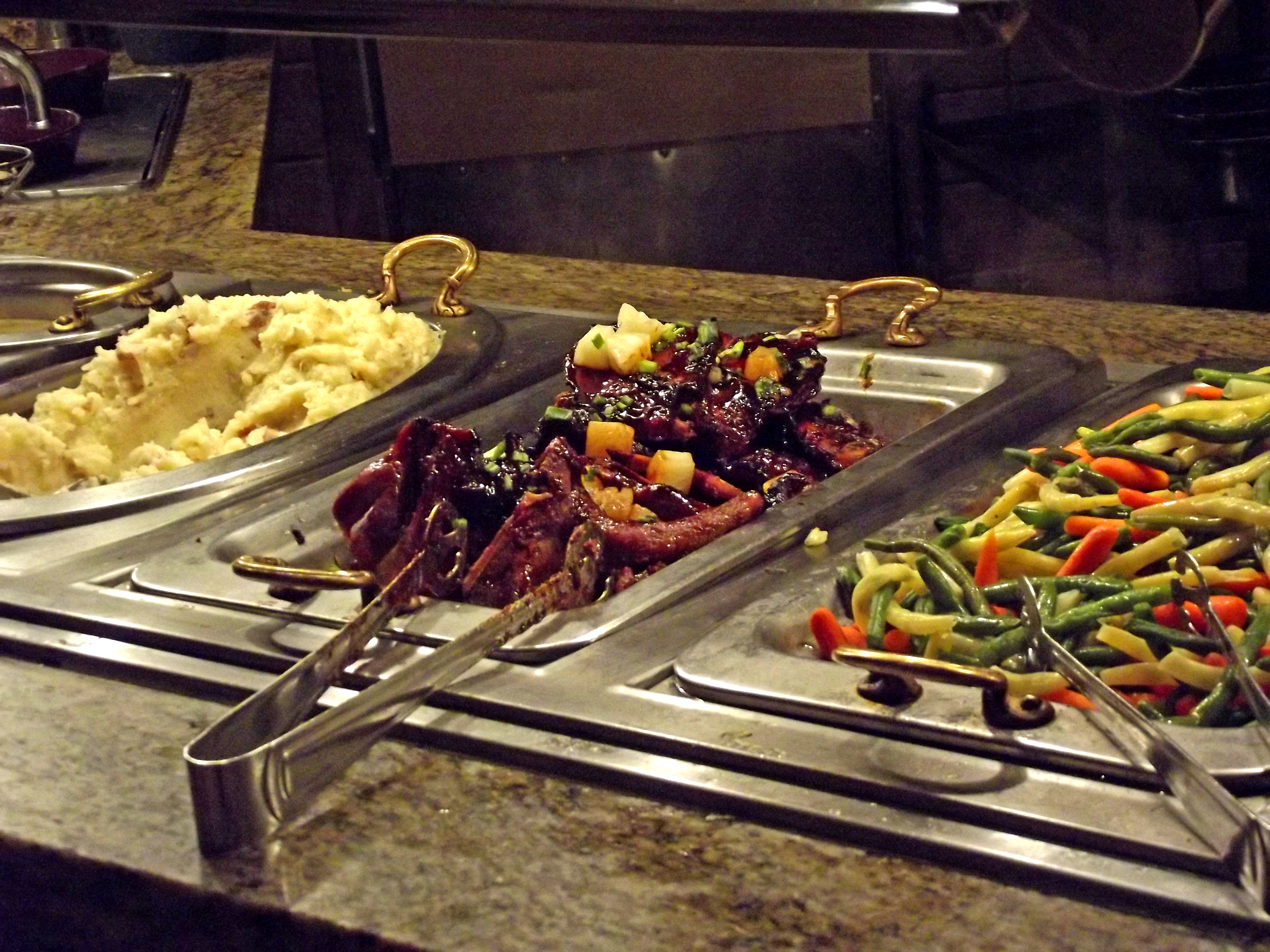
Foods at a buffet. National Buffet Week begins on January 2 each year in the United States.

Date	Event	Origin	Notes
January 5	National Whipped Cream Day		
January 23	National Pie Day	In 1975, Charlie Papazian, a teacher in Boulder, celebrated National Pie Day on his birthday, January 23. In 1986, the American Pie Council took over promotion of the day.	Also celebrated on Good Friday in south Louisiana.

=== February ===
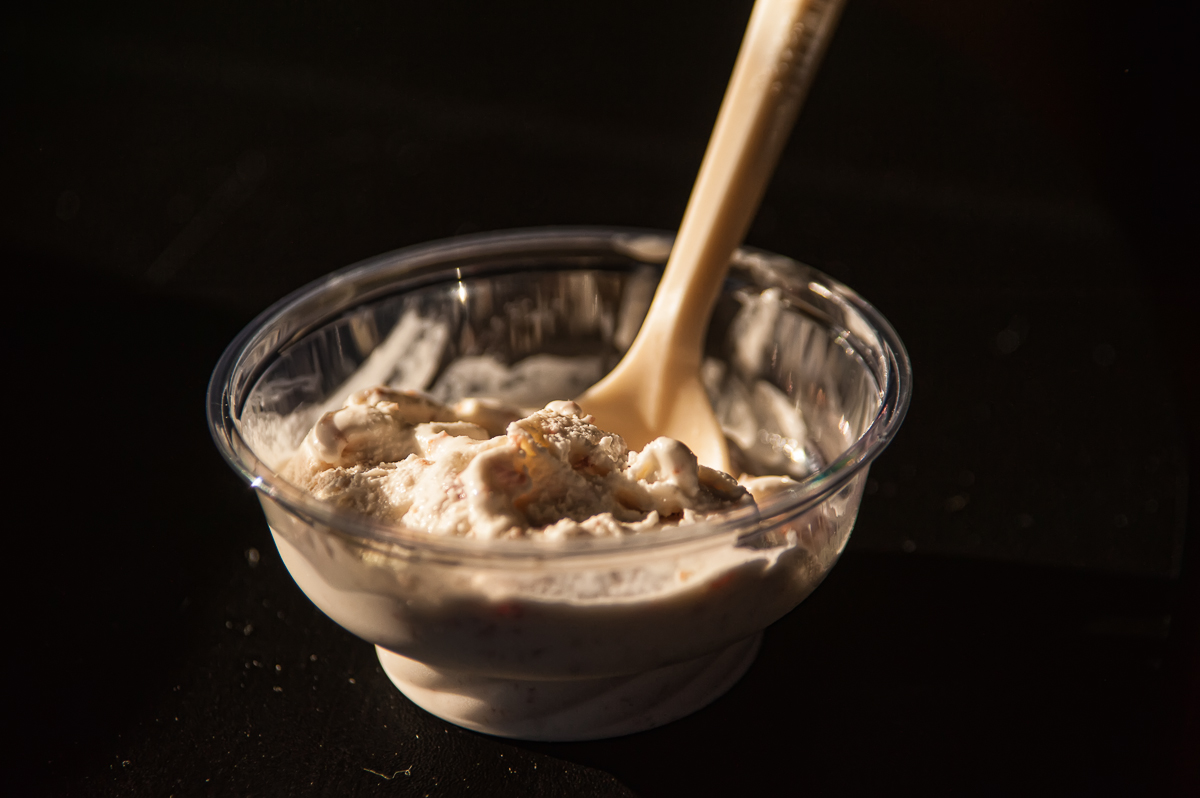
A bowl of ice cream offered for free by an ice cream vendor in celebration of Ice Cream for Breakfast Day, 2014

Date	Event	Origin	Notes
First Saturday of February	Ice Cream for Breakfast Day		
February 9	National Pizza Day		
February 9	National Bagel Day		
February 15	National "I Want Butterscotch" Day		
First Friday of Lent	Friday Fish Fry Day		
February 22	National Margarita Day		
February 23	National Banana Bread Day		

=== March ===
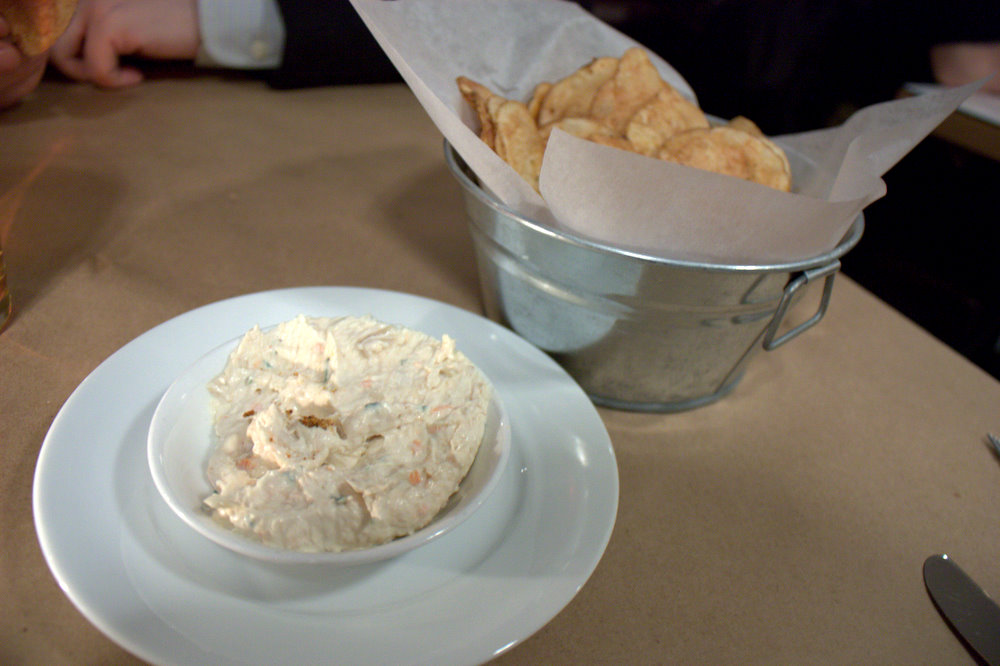
In the United States, March 23 is National Chips and Dip Day

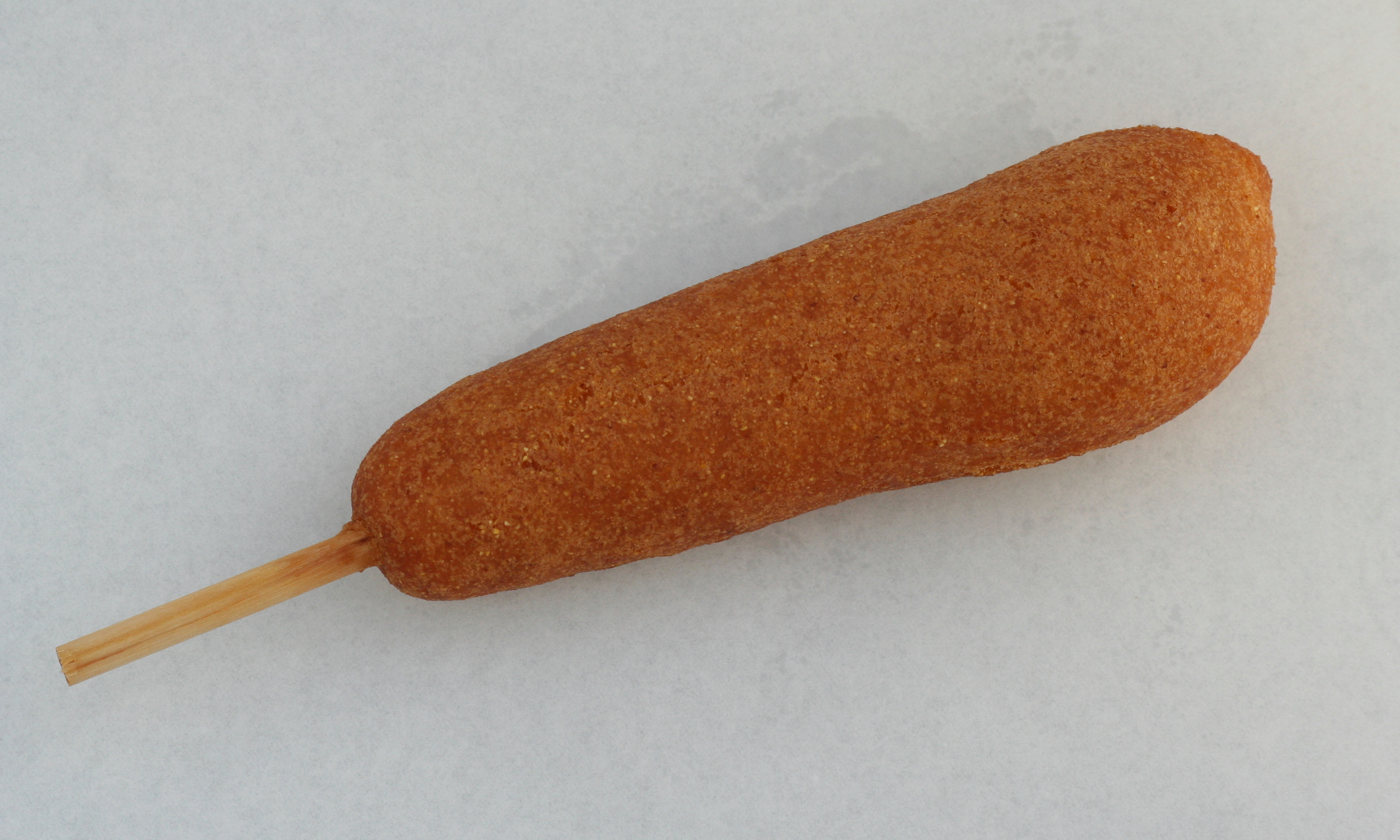
A corn dog; National Corndog Day occurs on March 22 in the United States

Date	Event	Origin	Notes
March 1	National Peanut Butter Lover's Day	National Peanut Board	
March 2	National Bananacreme Pie Day		
March 7	National Crown Roast of Pork Day		
March 8	National Peanut Cluster Day	National Peanut Board	
March 8	National Crabmeat Day		
March 9	National Blueberry Popover Day		
March 10	Oatmeal Nut Waffles Day		
March 12	National Baked Scallops Day		
March 22	National Corndog Day		
March 23	National Chips and Dip Day		
March 27	International Whiskey Day		
March 31	National Clams on the Half Shell Day		

=== April ===
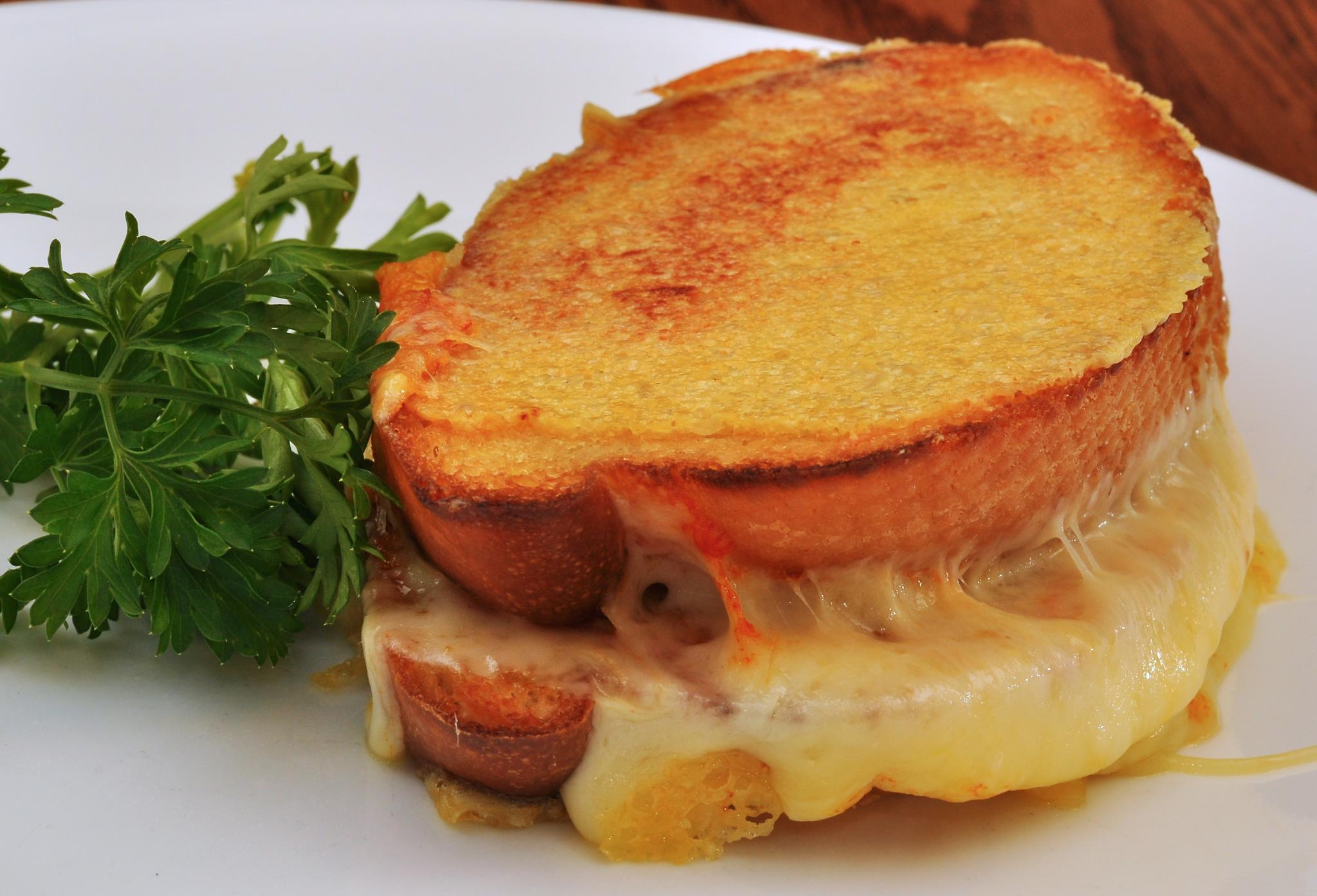
A grilled cheese sandwich; April 12 is National Grilled Cheese Sandwich Day

Date	Event	Origin	Notes
April 2	National Peanut Butter and Jelly Day		
April 5	National Caramel Day		
April 7	National Beer Day		
April 12	National Licorice Day		
April 12	National Grilled Cheese Sandwich Day		
April 17	National Cheeseball Day		
April 19	National Rice Ball Day		
April 24	National Pigs in a Blanket Day		
April 25	National Zucchini Bread Day		
April 26	National Pretzel Day		
April 27	National Prime Rib Day		
April 29	National Shrimp Scampi Day		

=== May ===
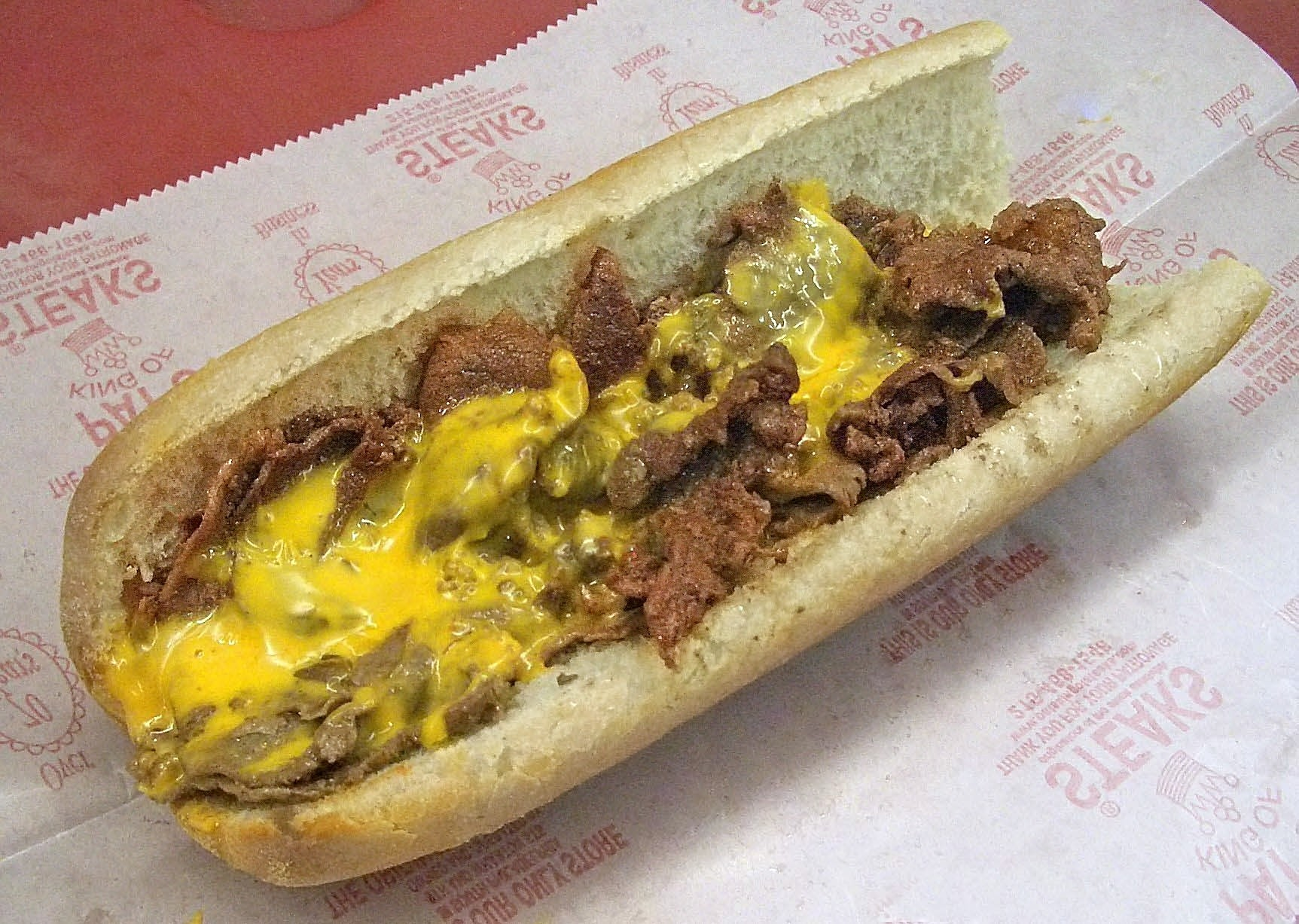
May 5 is National hoagie day in the United States. Pictured is a cheesesteak sandwich prepared with a hoagie roll.

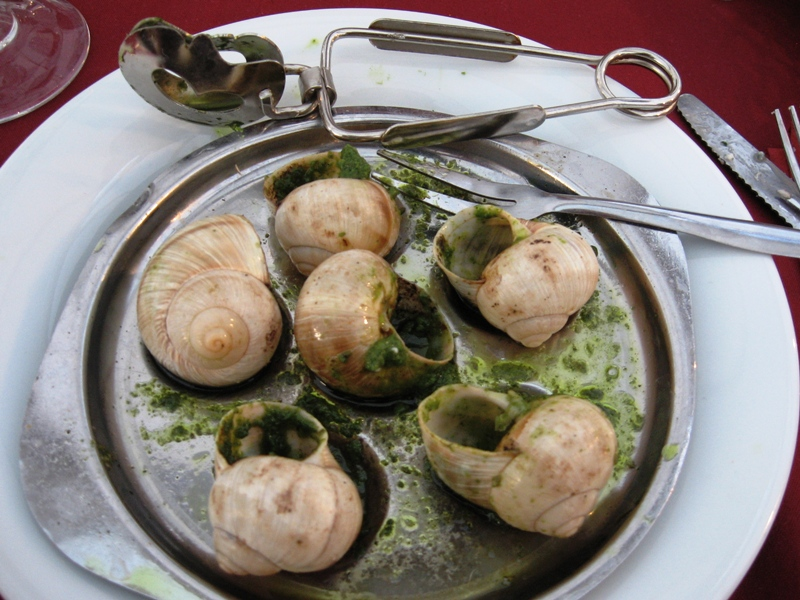
Escargot at a restaurant. May 24 is National Escargot Day.

Date	Event	Origin	Notes
May 4	National Candied Orange Peel Day		
May 5	National Hoagie Day		
Third Friday of May	National Pizza Party Day		
May 17	National Walnut Day	1949, Walnut Marketing Board; 1958, presidential proclamation by U.S. President Dwight Eisenhower	
May 23	National Taffy Day		
May 27	National Italian Beef Day		
May 28	National Brisket Day		
May 28	National Burger Day (Hamburger Day)	Hamburg, Germany	

=== June ===
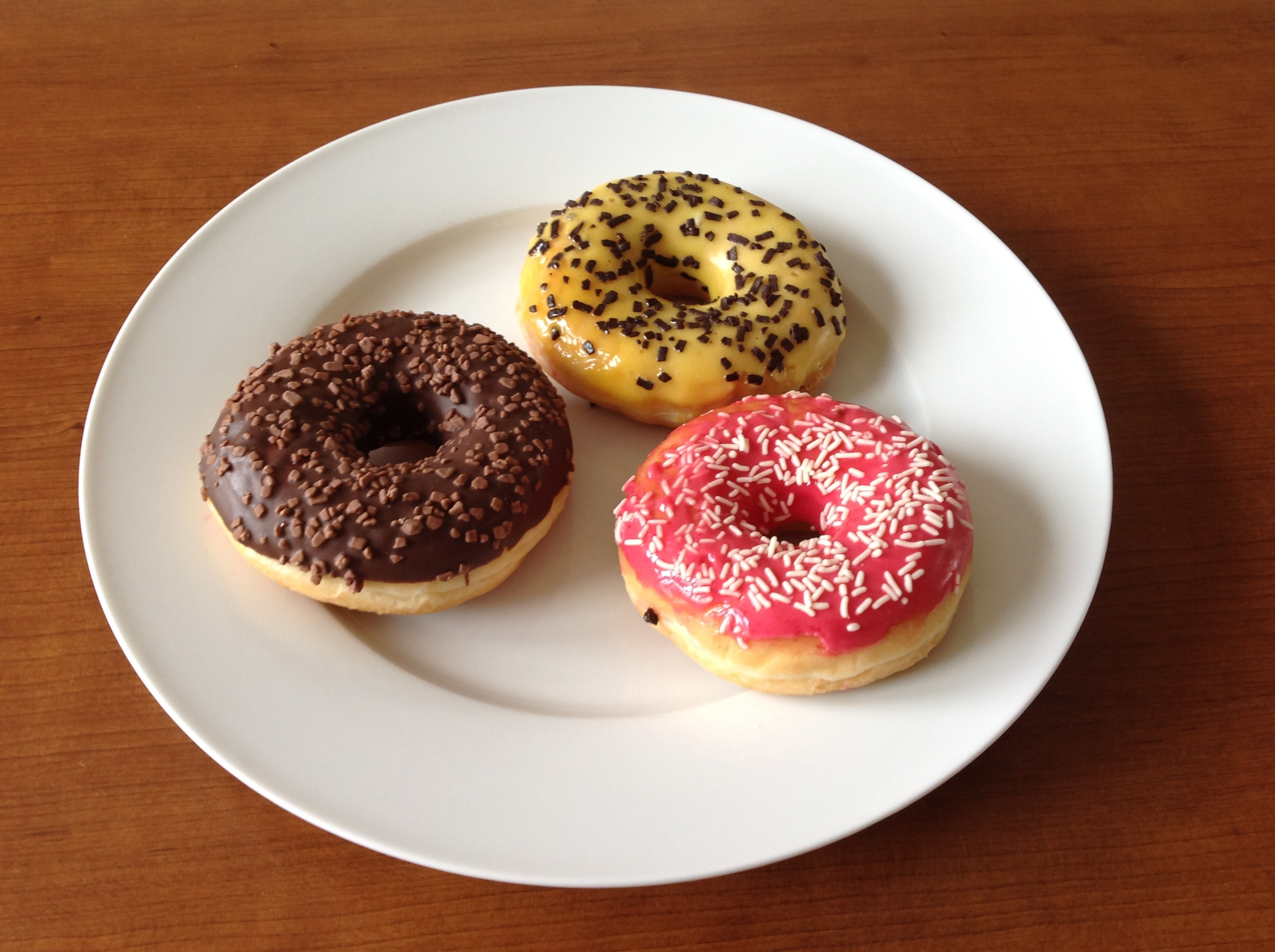
National Doughnut Day occurs on the first Friday of June every year.

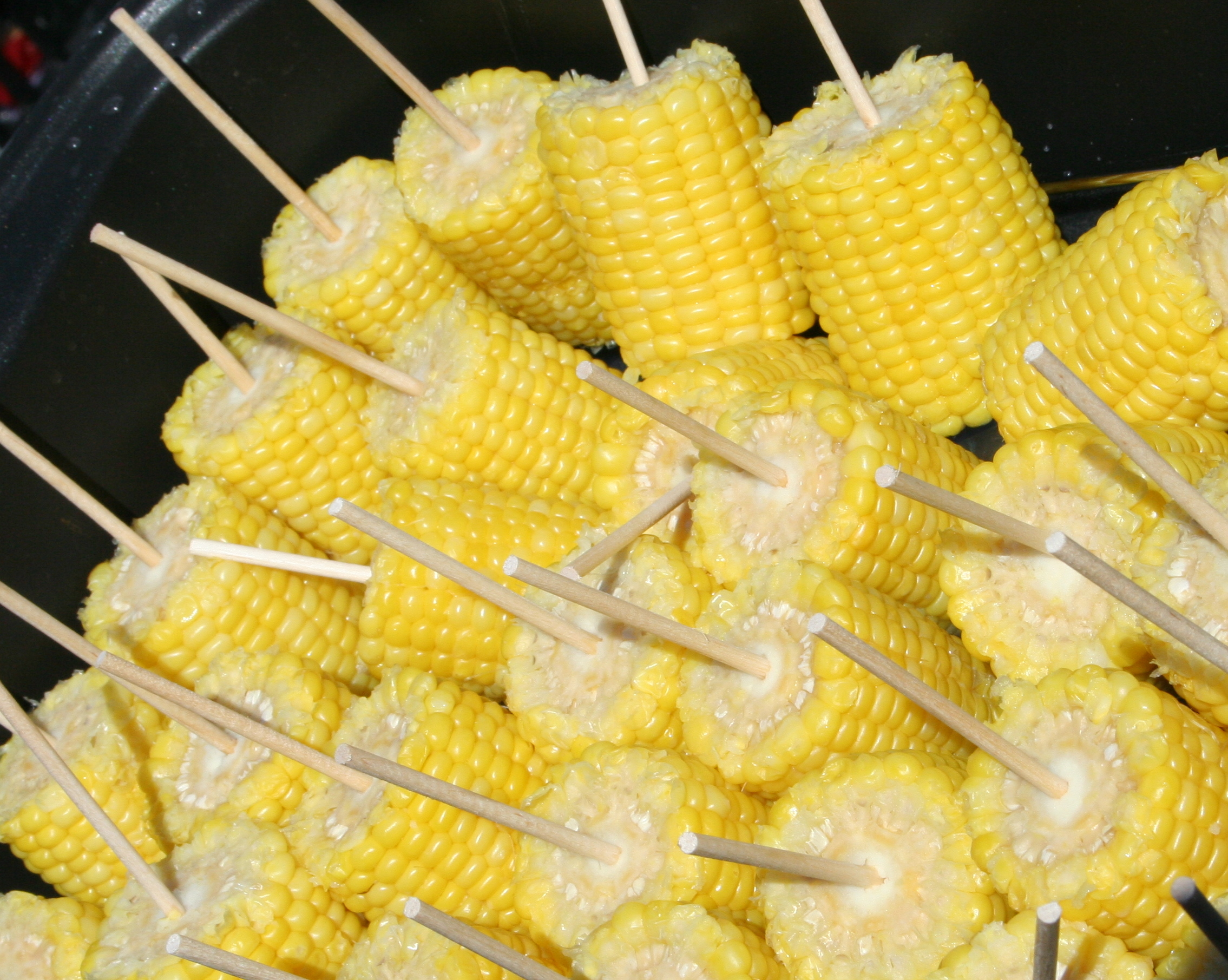
National Corn on the cob day occurs on June 11.

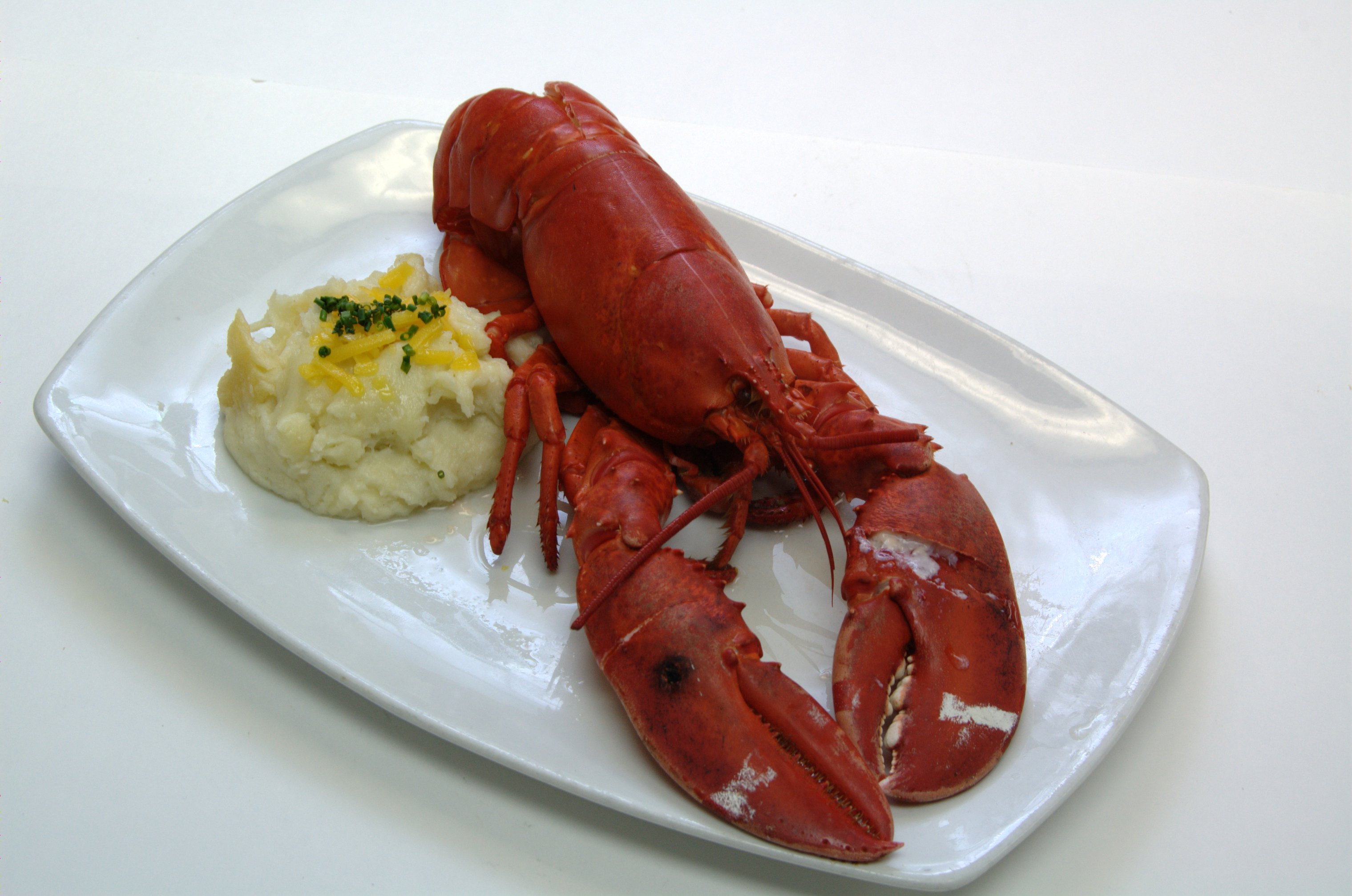
June 15 is National Lobster Day.

Date	Event	Origin	Notes
First Friday of June	National Donut/Doughnut Day	1938, The Salvation Army	
June 2	National Rotisserie Chicken Day		
June 2	National Rocky Road Day		
June 3	National Chocolate Macaroon Day		
June 3	National Egg Day		
June 4	National Cognac Day		
June 5	National Gingerbread Day		
June 5	National Moonshine Day		
June 6	National Applesauce Cake Day		
June 9	International Lemon Drizzle Cake Day		
June 10	National Iced Tea Day		
June 11	National Corn on the Cob Day		
June 12	National Peanut Butter Cookie Day	National Peanut Board	
June 15	National Lobster Day		
June 16	National Fudge Day		
June 20	National Vanilla Milkshake Day		
June 20	National Ice Cream Soda Day		
June 20	National Kouign Amann Day	A San Francisco bakery, to acknowledge the day they opened	
June 21	National Wagyu Day	2022, Steve Haddadin	
June 25	National Catfish Day	Presidential proclamation by U.S. President Ronald Reagan on June 25, 1987	
June 26	National Chocolate Pudding Day		
June 28	National Ceviche Day		
June 28	National Tapioca Day		

=== July ===
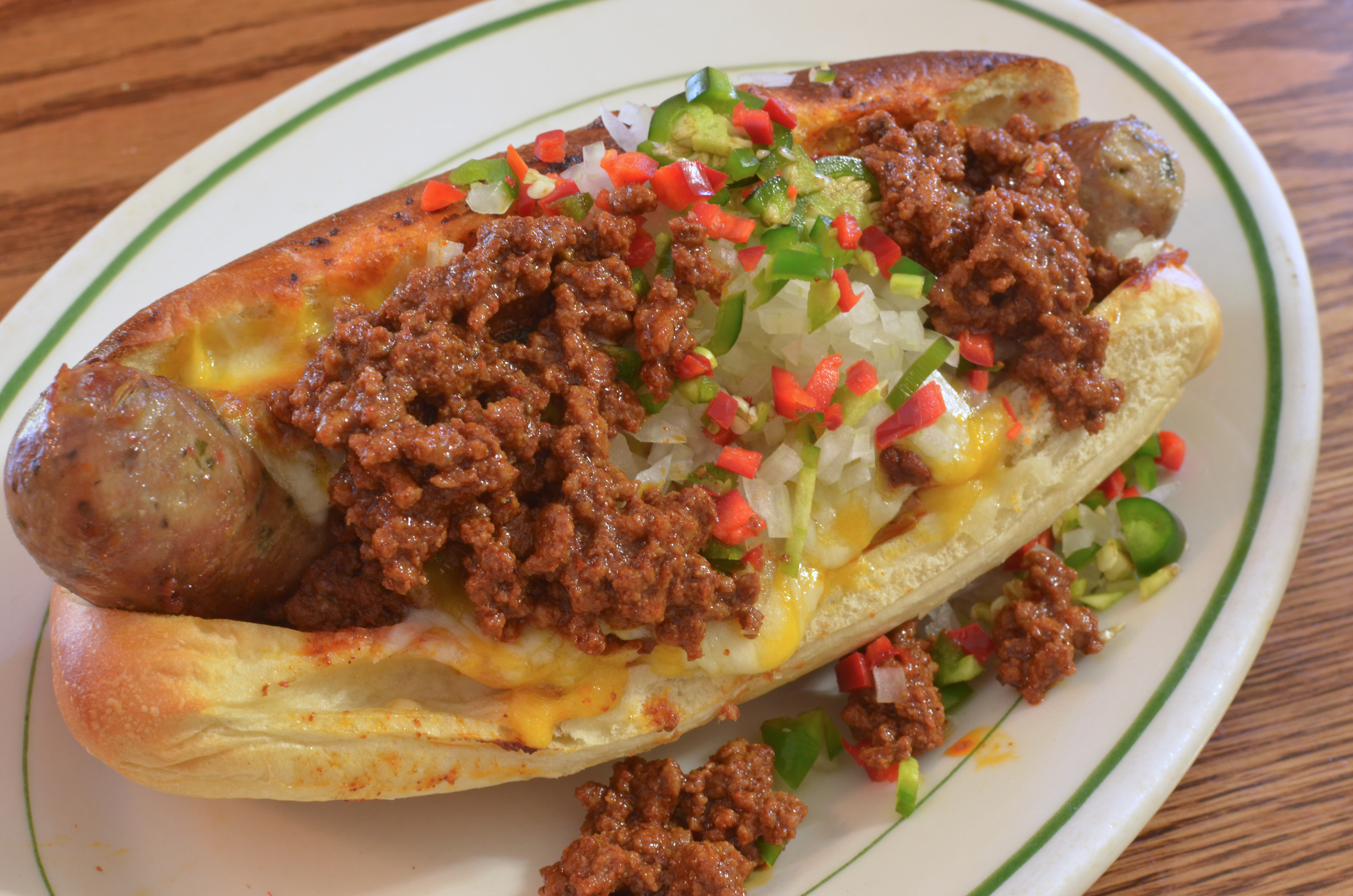
National Chili Dog Day occurs on the fourth Thursday of July.

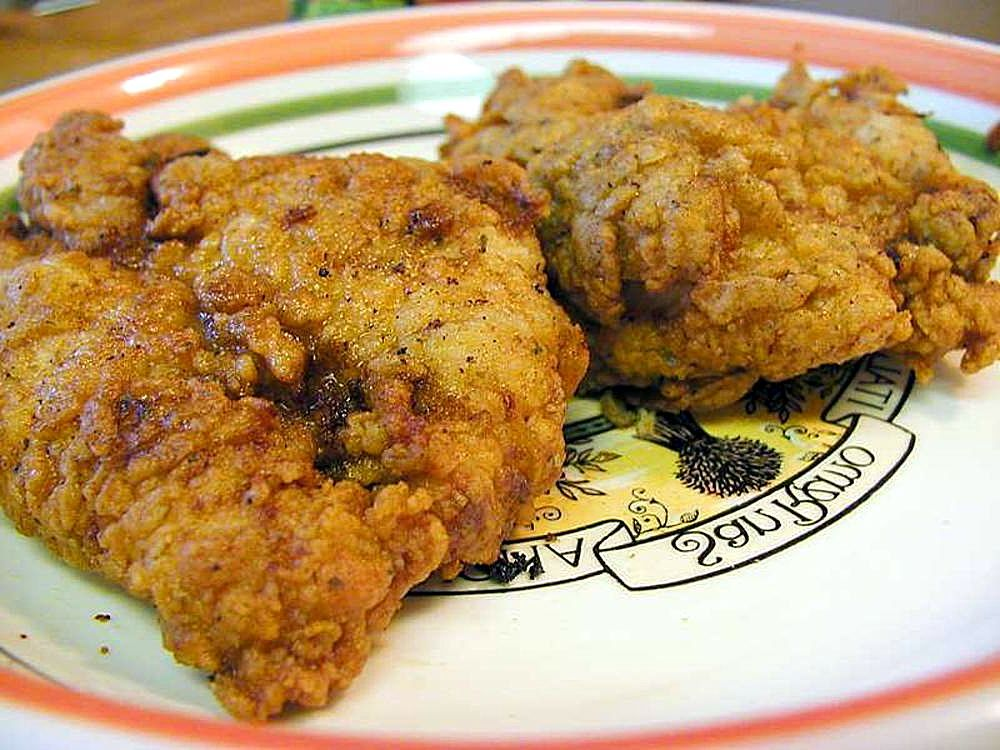
National Fried Chicken Day occurs on July 6.

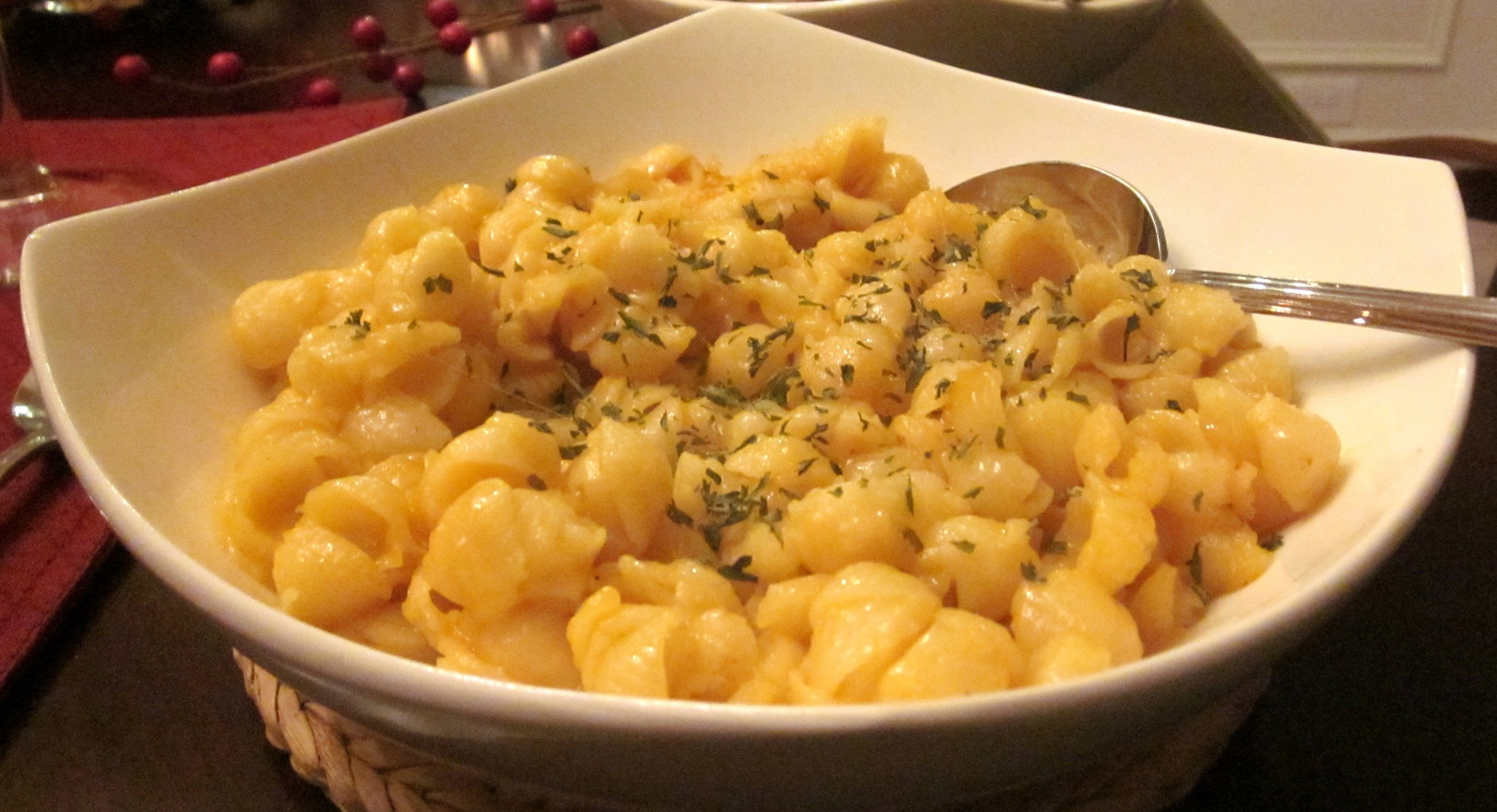
July 14 is National Mac & Cheese Day.

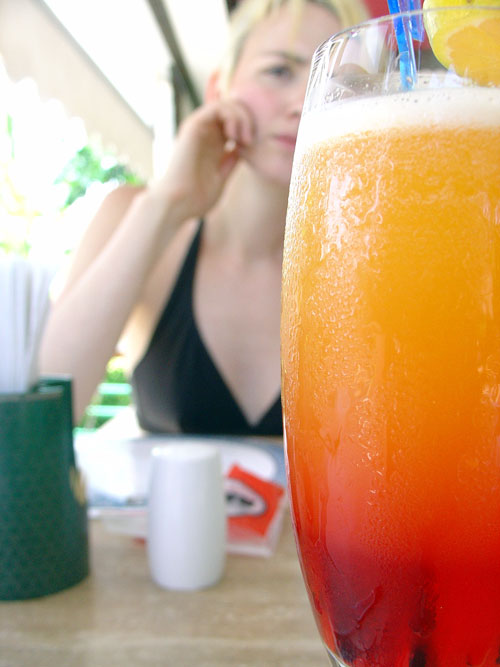
July 24 is National Tequila Day. Pictured is a Tequila Sunrise.

Date	Event	Origin	Notes
Third Sunday of July	National Ice Cream Day	1984, presidential proclamation	
Fourth Thursday of July	National Chili Dog Day		
July 1	National Gingersnap Day		
July 2	National Anisette Day		
July 3	Eat Beans Day		
July 5	National Apple Turnover Day		
July 6	National Fried Chicken Day		
July 7	Macaroni Day		
July 7	National Strawberry Sundae Day		
July 8	National Chocolate with Almonds Day		
July 9	National Sugar Cookie Day		
July 10	National Piña Colada Day		
July 11	National Blueberry Muffin Day		
July 12	National Pecan Pie Day		
Second Fry-day of July	National French Fries Day		
July 15	National Tapioca Pudding Day		
July 15	Gummi Worm Day		
July 16	Fresh Spinach Day		
July 16	National Corn Fritter Day		
July 17	National Peach Ice Cream Day		
July 20	National Fortune Cookie Day		
July 20	National Lollipop Day		
July 21	Junk Food Day		
July 22	National Penuche Fudge Day		
July 23	National Vanilla Ice Cream Day		
July 24	National Tequila Day		
July 24	National Drive-Thru Day		
July 25	National Hot Fudge Sundae Day		
July 26	National Coffee Milkshake Day		
July 27	National Creme Brulee Day		
July 27	National Scotch Day		
July 28	National Milk Chocolate Day		
July 29	National Lasagna Day		
July 29	National Chicken Wing Day		
July 30	National Cheesecake Day		
July 31	National Raspberry Cake Day		

=== August ===
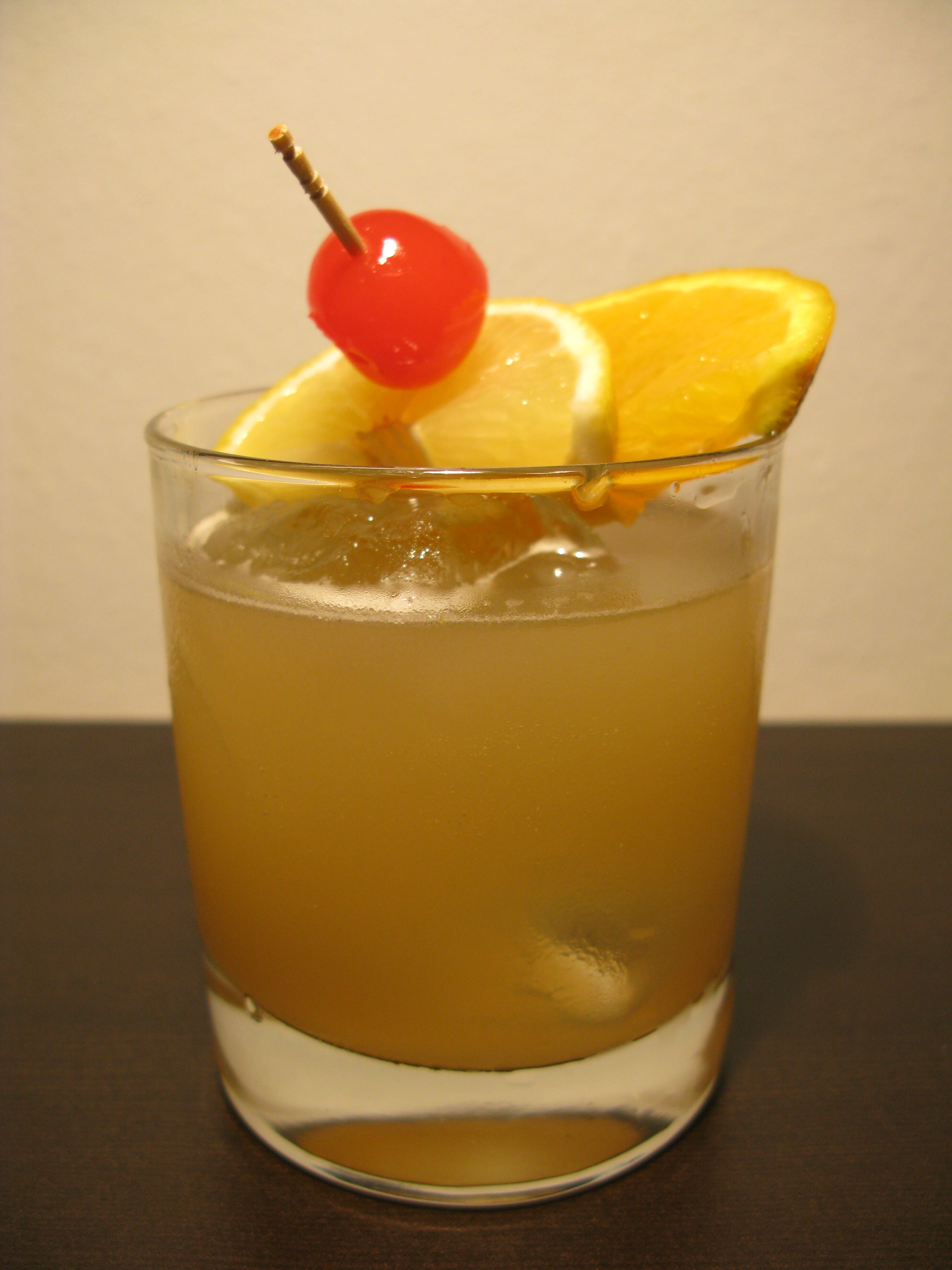
August 25 is National Whiskey Sour Day.

Date	Event	Origin	Notes
First Saturday of August	National Mustard Day	Mount Horeb Mustard Museum	
First Saturday of August	National Mead Day	American Homebrewer's Association, 2002	
August 3	National White Wine Day		
August 4	National Chocolate Chip Cookie Day		
August 6	National Root Beer Float Day		
August 13	National Filet Mignon Day		
August 14	National Creamsicle Day		
August 15	National Lemon Meringue Pie Day		
August 16	National Rum Day		
August 17	National Vanilla Custard Day		
August 18	National Pinot Noir Day		
August 19	National Potato Day		
August 21	National Spumoni Day		
August 22	National Pecan Torte Day		
August 22	National Eat A Peach Day		
August 23	National Sponge Cake Day		
August 24	National Peach Pie Day		
August 24	National Waffle Day		
August 25	National Banana Split Day		
August 25	National Whiskey Sour Day		
August 26	National Cherry Popsicle Day		
August 27	National Pots de Crème Day		
August 27	National Banana Lovers Day		
August 28	National Cherry Turnover Day		
August 30	National Toasted Marshmallow Day		
August 31	Trail Mix Day		

=== September ===
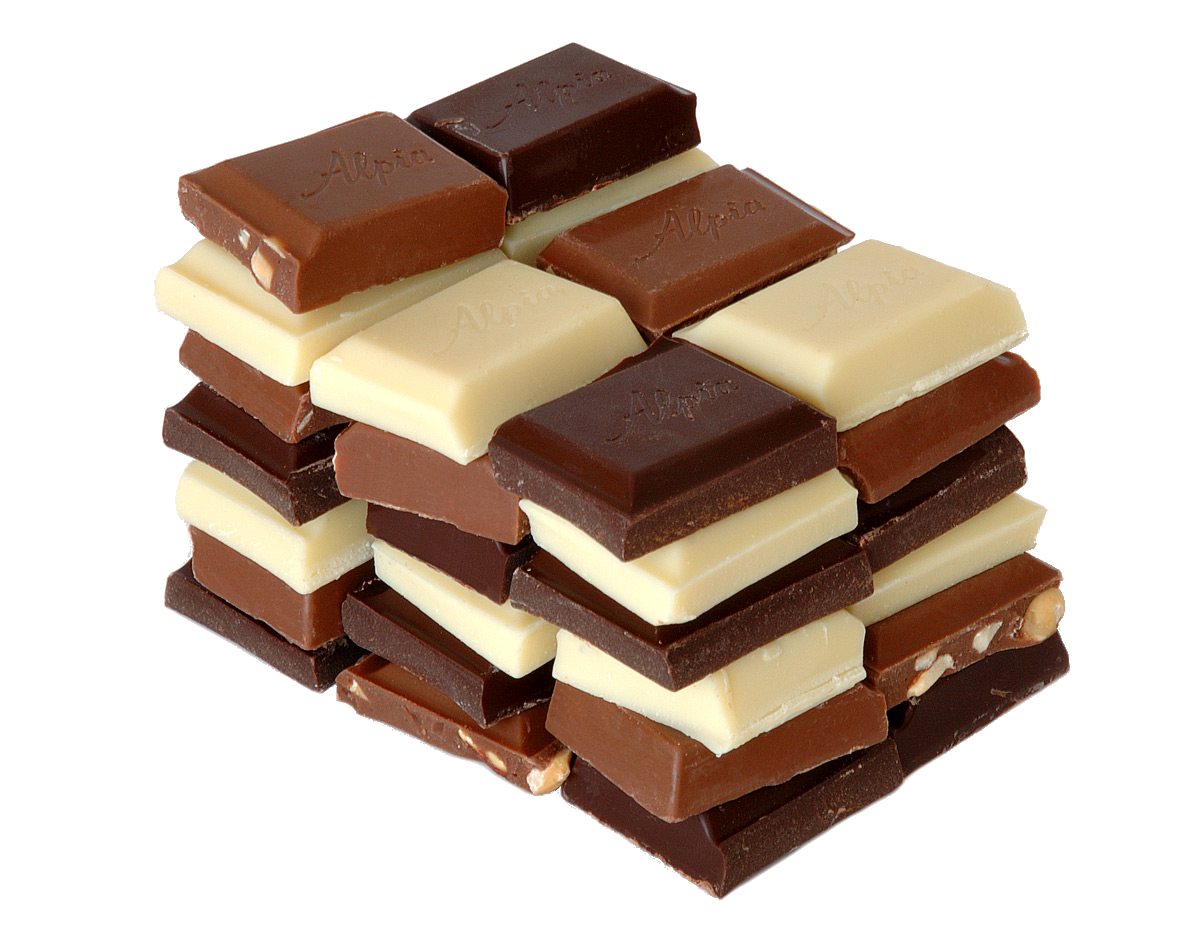
September 13 is International Chocolate Day in the United States.

Date	Event	Origin	Notes
September 1	National Cherry Popover Day		
September 2	National Blueberry Popsicle Day		
September 3	National Welsh Rarebit Day		
September 4	National Macadamia Nut Day		
September 5	National Cheese Pizza Day		
September 6	National Coffee Ice Cream Day		
September 7	National Acorn Squash Day		
September 7	National Salami Day		
September 9	National Steak Au Poivre Day		
September 9	Wiener schnitzel Day		
September 10	National TV Dinner Day		
September 11	National Hot Cross Bun Day		
September 12	National Chocolate Milkshake Day		
September 13	National Peanut Day		
September 14	National Eat a Hoagie Day		
September 14	National Cream-Filled Donut Day		
September 15	National Crème de Menthe Day		
September 15	National Double Cheeseburger Day		
September 15	National Linguine Day		
September 15	National Cheese Toast Day		
September 16	National Guacamole Day		
September 16	National Cinnamon-Raisin Bread Day		
September 17	National Apple Dumpling Day		
September 17	National Monte Cristo Sandwich Day		
September 18	National Cheeseburger Day		
September 19	National Butterscotch Pudding Day		
September 20	National Punch Day		
September 20	National Rum Punch Day		
September 20	National Queso Day		
September 25	National Lobster Day		
September 25	National Quesadilla Day		
September 26	National Better Breakfast Day		
September 27	National Chocolate Milk Day		
September 28	Family Day – A Day to Eat Dinner with Your Children		
September 29	National Coffee Day		
September 29	National Biscotti Day	Biscotti Goddess	
September 30	National Hot Mulled Cider Day		

=== October ===
Date	Event	Origin	Notes
October 2	National Fried Scallops Day		
October 4	National Vodka Day		
October 9	International Beer and Pizza Day		
October 9	National Baking Soda Rocket Day		
October 11	National Sausage Pizza Day		
October 20	National Brandied Fruit Day		
October 20	National Office Chocolate Day		
October 23	National Boston Creme Pie Day		
October 24	National Bologna Day		
October 24	National Food Day	Center for Science in the Public Interest	
October 25	National Greasy Food Day		
October 28	National Chocolate Day		
October 29	National Oatmeal Day		
October 30	National Candy Corn Day		
October 31	National Candy Apple Day		

=== November ===
Date	Event	Origin	Notes
First Thursday of November	National Men Make Dinner Day	1998, Sandy Sharkey	
Fourth Thursday of November	Thanksgiving Day		
Day after Thanksgiving	Sinkie Day		
First Wednesday of November	National Eating Healthy Day	American Heart Association	
November 1	National Vinegar Day		
November 1	National Cook For Your Pets Day		
November 2	National Deviled Egg Day		
November 2	National Pico de Gallo Day		
November 3	National Sandwich Day		
November 4	National Candy Day		
November 6	National Nachos Day		
November 7	National Bittersweet Chocolate with Almonds Day		
November 8	National Harvey Wallbanger Day		
November 8	Cook Something Bold and Pungent Day	Thomas Roy	
November 9	National Scrapple Day		
November 10	National Vanilla Cupcake Day		
November 11	National Sundae Day		
November 12	National Pizza with the Works Except Anchovies Day		
November 12	Chicken Soup for the Soul Day	Chicken Soup for the Soul Enterprises Inc.	
November 14	National Pickle Day		
November 15	National Spicy Hermit Cookie Day		
November 16	National Fast Food Day		
November 17	National Baklava Day		
November 17	Homemade Bread Day		
November 18	National Vichyssoise Day		
November 18	National Apple Cider Day		
November 19	Carbonated Beverage with Caffeine Day		
November 20	National Peanut Butter Fudge Day	National Peanut Board	
November 21	National Stuffing Day		
November 23	National Cashew Day		
November 23	National Eat A Cranberry Day		
November 23	National Espresso Day		
November 25	National Parfait Day		
November 26	National Cake Day		
November 28	National French Toast Day		
November 29	Throw Out Your Leftovers Day		
November 29	National Chocolates Day		
November 30	National Mousse Day		

=== December ===
Date	Event	Origin	Ref(s)
December 1	Eat a Red Apple Day		
December 2	National Fritters Day		
December 4	National Cookie Day	1987, Blue Chip Cookies	
December 8	National Brownie Day		
December 9	National Pastry Day		
December 11	National Noodle Ring Day		
December 15	National Cupcake Day		
December 20	National Cortado Day		
December 25	National Pumpkin Pie Day		
December 27	National Fruitcake Day		
December 31	National Champagne Day		

== See also ==
- List of awareness days
- Chase's Calendar of Events
- Hallmark holiday
- International observance
- List of commemorative days
- List of foods named after people
- Lists of holidays
- List of unofficial observances by date
- Traditional food
- List of vegetarian festivals

== Sources ==
- "Ever wonder where all those national food holidays come from? The answer is complicated". Tampa Bay Times. August 15, 2016.
- "Why We Keep Getting More Holidays Devoted to Your Favorite Snack". Bloomberg. July 17, 2021.
- Randolph, Laurel (December 1, 2015). "The Story Behind National Food Holidays". Paste.
- Fleming, Ebony C. (July 29, 2014). "National food days: A food for every day". Chron.
- Snider, Mike (August 4, 2020). "Coronavirus reality: What day is it? Remove the mundane with days to celebrate white wine, cookies, beer and more". USA Today.
- Morillo, Alexis (November 1, 2021). "88 Food And Drink Holidays You Need To Mark On Your Calendars For Free Food". Delish.
- "14 National Food Holidays That Offer Free Meals and Treats". U.S. News & World Report.
- McSwain, Megha (June 24, 2022). "Ranking the 12 worst national food holidays". Chron.
- "National Food Days: An American Tradition". VOA. August 12, 2017.
- Smith, A. (2013). The Oxford Encyclopedia of Food and Drink in America. OUP USA. p. 643. ISBN 978-0-19-973496-2. (subscription required)
- Schaltegger, Megan (November 1, 2021). "71 National Food Days To Know About If You Like Free Food". Delish.
