= Chocolate Day (Ghana) =

National celebration on Valentine's Day

- Official name: National Chocolate Day
- Observed by: Ghana
- Type: National
- Significance: Celebration to promote Ghanaian made chocolate and cocoa based products
- Date: 14 February
- Frequency: Annual
- First time: 2005; 21 years ago

The Chocolate Day (known as National Chocolate Day) is a celebration instituted by the Ghana Tourism Authority in 2005 to coincide with Valentine's Day. The celebration which is earmarked for 14 February annually, is targeted at boosting the domestic consumption of Ghanaian chocolate and other cocoa based products, to promote domestic tourism and to give a healthy orientation to the celebration of Valentine's Day.

== History ==
The National Chocolate Day in Ghana was established in 2005. The initiative is also aimed at shifting the attention of the youth from engaging in sexual activities towards showcasing love to their loved ones through a gift of chocolate. The activity was instituted by the Ghana Tourism Authority in partnership with the Cocoa Processing Company of Ghana, the idea was instituted as part of the Ghana@50 celebrations by the Minister of Tourism at the time, Jake Obetsebi Lamptey.

At the launch of the celebration, the Minister made reference to the low consumption of cocoa products in the country even though the country was the second largest producer of cocoa in the world and hoped that the institution of the day will encourage consumption among Ghanaians. The ministry also mentioned the proposed establishment of a cocoa museum following the initiation of the day.

== See also ==
- World Chocolate Day
- National Chocolate Day
- List of food days
