= International Coffee Day =

International observance

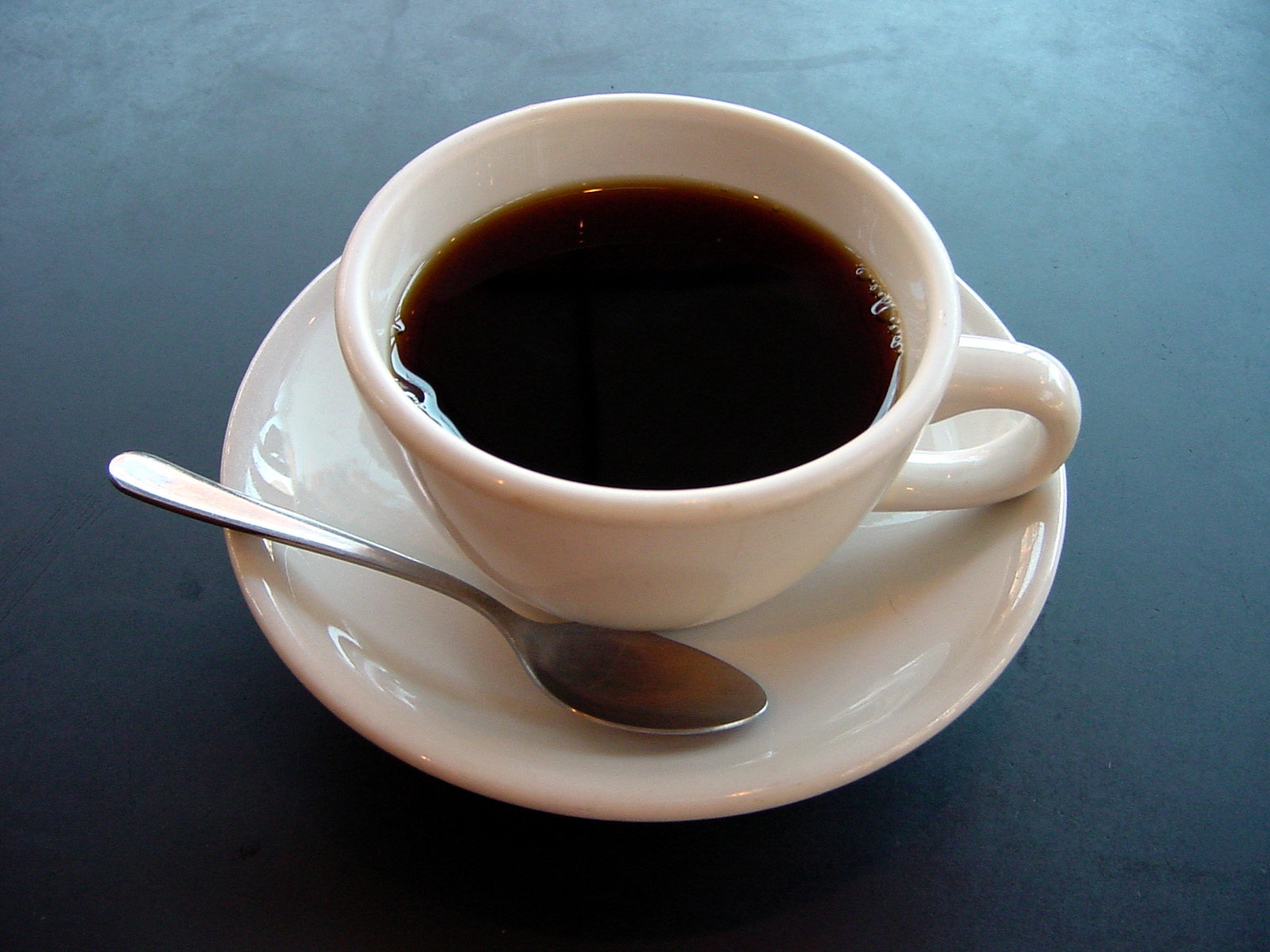
A cup of coffee

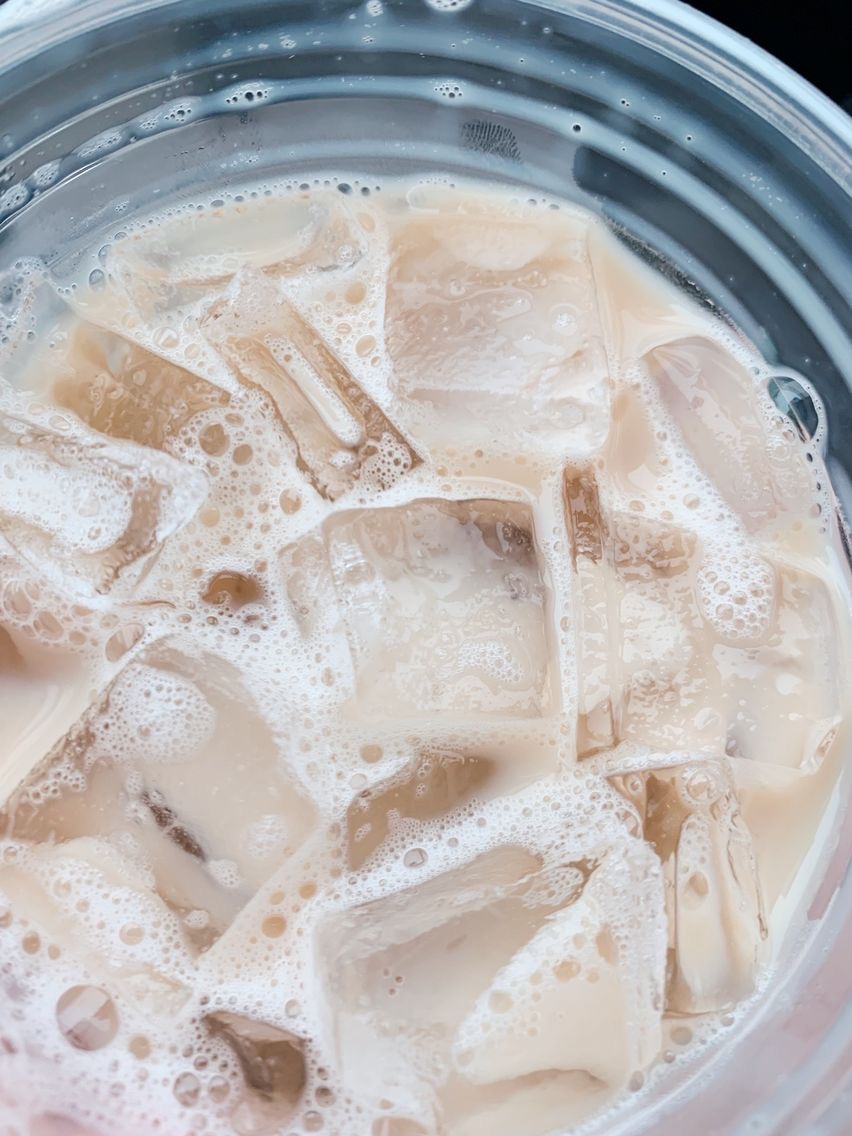
Iced coffee

International Coffee Day is an occasion that is used to promote and celebrate coffee as a beverage, with events now occurring in places around the world. The first official date was 1 October 2015, as agreed by then International Coffee Organization and was launched in Milan. This day is also used to promote fair trade coffee and to raise awareness for the plight of the coffee growers. On this day, many businesses offer free or discounted cups of coffee. Some businesses share coupons and special deals with their loyal followers via social networking. Some greeting card companies sell International Coffee Day greeting cards as well as free e-cards. Many countries around the world celebrate their own national coffee days at various dates throughout the year. In March 2014, the Member States of the ICO (International Coffee Organization) agreed to organise International Coffee Day on 1 October to create a single day of celebration for coffee lovers around the world.

== History ==
At a meeting on 3–7 March 2014, a decision was taken by the International Coffee Organization to launch the first official International Coffee Day in Milan as part of Expo 2015.

Various events have been held, called Coffee Day or National Coffee Day, with many of these on or around September 29.

The exact origin of International Coffee Day is unknown. An event was first promoted in Japan in 1983 by the All Japan Coffee Association (全日本コーヒー協会). In the United States "National Coffee Day" was mentioned publicly as early as 2005. The name "International Coffee Day" was first used by the Southern Food and Beverage Museum, which called a press conference on 3 October 2009 to celebrate it and to announce the first New Orleans Coffee Festival. It was promoted in China by the International Coffee Organization, first celebrated in 1997, and made into an annual celebration in early April 2001. Taiwan first celebrated International Coffee Day in 2009. Nepal first celebrated National Coffee Day on 17 November 2005.

On 10 March, 2026, the UN General Assembly adopted 1 October as International Coffee Day.

== National coffee days ==
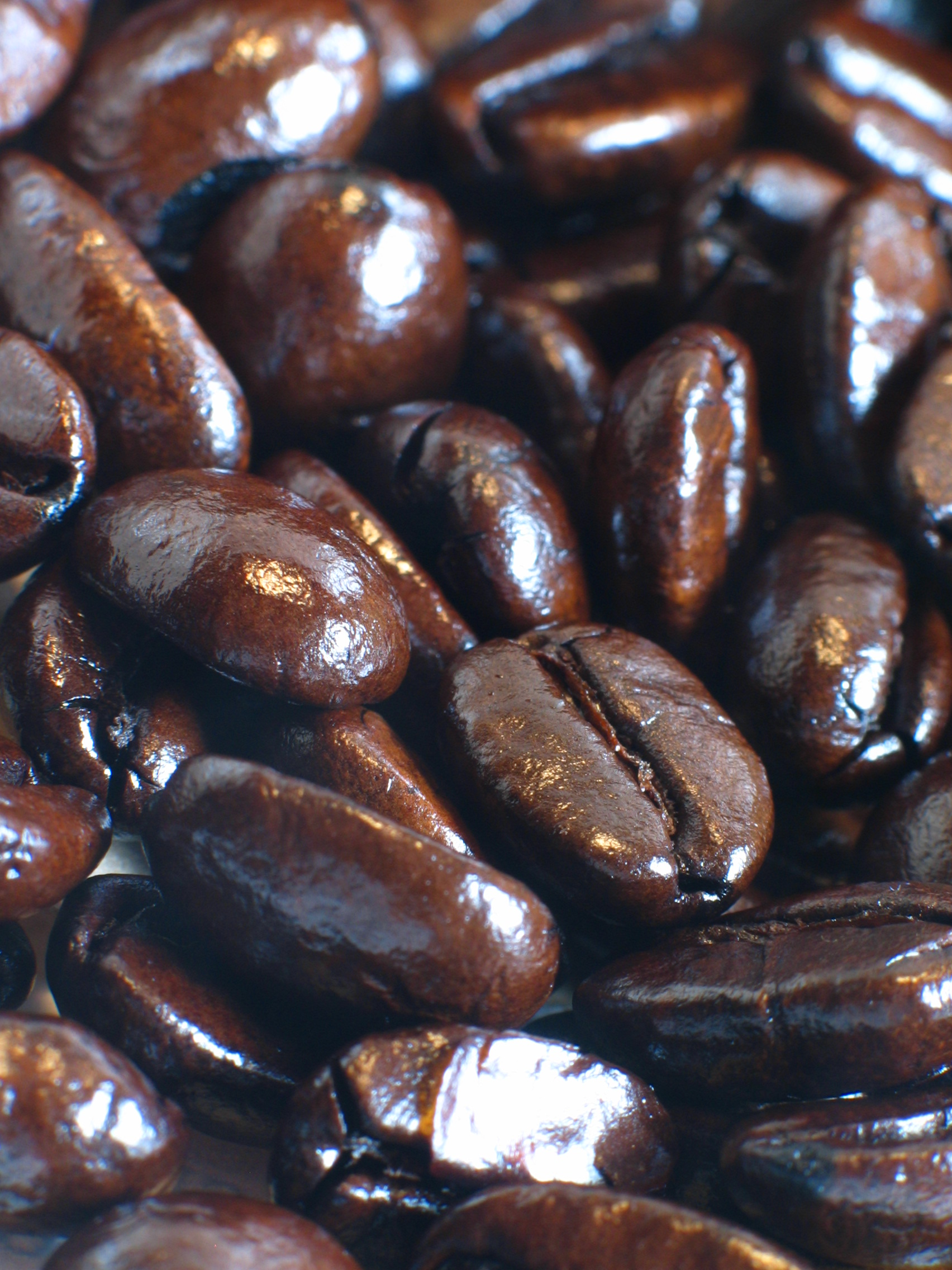
Roasted coffee beans

Date	Countries
January 3	Mongolia
March 11	Indonesia
March 23	Italy
April 14	Portugal
May 24	Brazil
June 6	Finland
June 27	Colombia
August, 4th Friday	Peru
September, 2nd Friday	Costa Rica
September, 4th Tuesday	Netherlands
September, Last Friday	Germany
September 15	Ethiopia
September 28	Switzerland
September 29	Austria; Canada; Hungary; Iceland; India; Norway; Romania; South Africa; Taiwan; United States; Pakistan, Karachi; Poland
October 1	Australia; Belgium; Chile; Honduras; Ireland; Slovakia; Sweden; Japan; Malaysia; Mexico; New Zealand; Singapore; Sri Lanka; United Kingdom; Bangladesh; Greece
October 21	Philippines – Conceived to showcase Lipa City as the longstanding "Coffee Granary of the Philippines"
December 5	Turkey
December 10	Vietnam

== See also ==
- List of food days
- International Tea Day
