= Milk Day =

Milk Day may be a reference to:

- Harvard Milk Day, an unofficial celebration in Harvard, Illinois
- Harvey Milk Day, a celebration of the life of Harvey Milk, a murdered gay rights activist
- World Milk Day, a United Nations organized day to celebrate the importance of milk
- National Milk Day (India), an observance of Verghese Kurien's birthday by the Indian milk industry

== See also ==
- Martin Luther King Jr. Day, often written as MLK Day
