= Food Day =

American holiday

Food Day in the United States is celebrated annually on October 24 and often throughout the month. The celebration was started in 1975 by the Center for Science in the Public Interest (CSPI) in an attempt to create an event similar to Earth Day. Food Day in the U.S. was created to raise awareness about the increasing industrialization of American agriculture, rising food prices, hunger, and the American diet and health crisis. Food Day in the U.S. only lasted until 1977, until 2011, when CSPI revived the National Food Day campaign. The Food Day initiative is now run by FoodDay.org within CSPI.

Food Day is still focused on raising awareness and changing behaviors related to food in the U.S. Issues of concern include: nutrition education, food rescue, sustainable agriculture, hunger, farm animal welfare, and farm and food service worker rights. Food Day in the U.S. is typically celebrated by nationwide and local events to educate people about the food system and/or to gain support for policies that event hosts deem to be improvements for the current food system, such as improved nutrition labels, funding for SNAP, and decreased use of antibiotics in food-producing animals typically in factory farms.

2,300 events took place across the country during Food Day in 2011, 3,200 in 2012, and over 4,700 events in 2013. Events have been hosted by a variety of different groups including local governments, food co-ops, schools, college campuses, non-profits, businesses, government agencies, food banks, farms and farmers, and restaurants.

Food Day or Food Day Canada is a culinary celebration that originated in Canada as "The World's Longest BBQ" in reaction to the BSE crisis of 2003. This economic crisis for farmers was a trade embargo by the US on Canadian beef, based on a single case of BSE (or mad cow disease) in Alberta, Canada. Since that year, Food Day has evolved into a celebration by chefs from across Canada. Food Day happens every day in Canada on the Saturday of the August long weekend (also known as the Civic Holiday Weekend). Food Day was founded by Canadian culinary pioneer, Anita Stewart.

== See also ==
- List of food days
