= National Donut Day =

Holiday in the United States

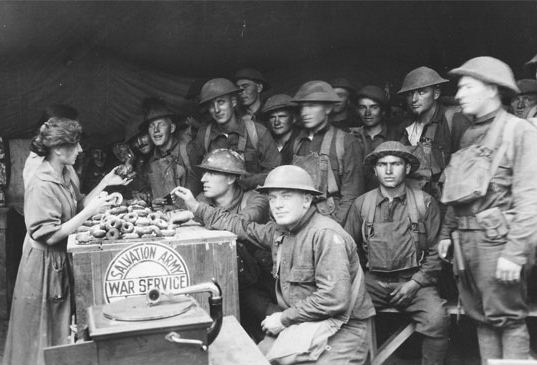
Salvation Army volunteers traveled overseas to set up service huts located in abandoned buildings near the front lines where they could serve baked goods.

National Donut Day or National Doughnut Day, celebrated in the United States and in some other countries, is on the first Friday of June of each year, succeeding the donut event created by The Salvation Army in Chicago in 1938 to honor those of their members who served donuts to soldiers during World War I. Many American donut stores offer free donuts on the occasion.

== History ==
National Donut Day started in 1938 as a fundraiser for Chicago's The Salvation Army. Their goal was to help those in need during the Great Depression, and to honor the Salvation Army "Lassies" of World War I, who served donuts to soldiers.

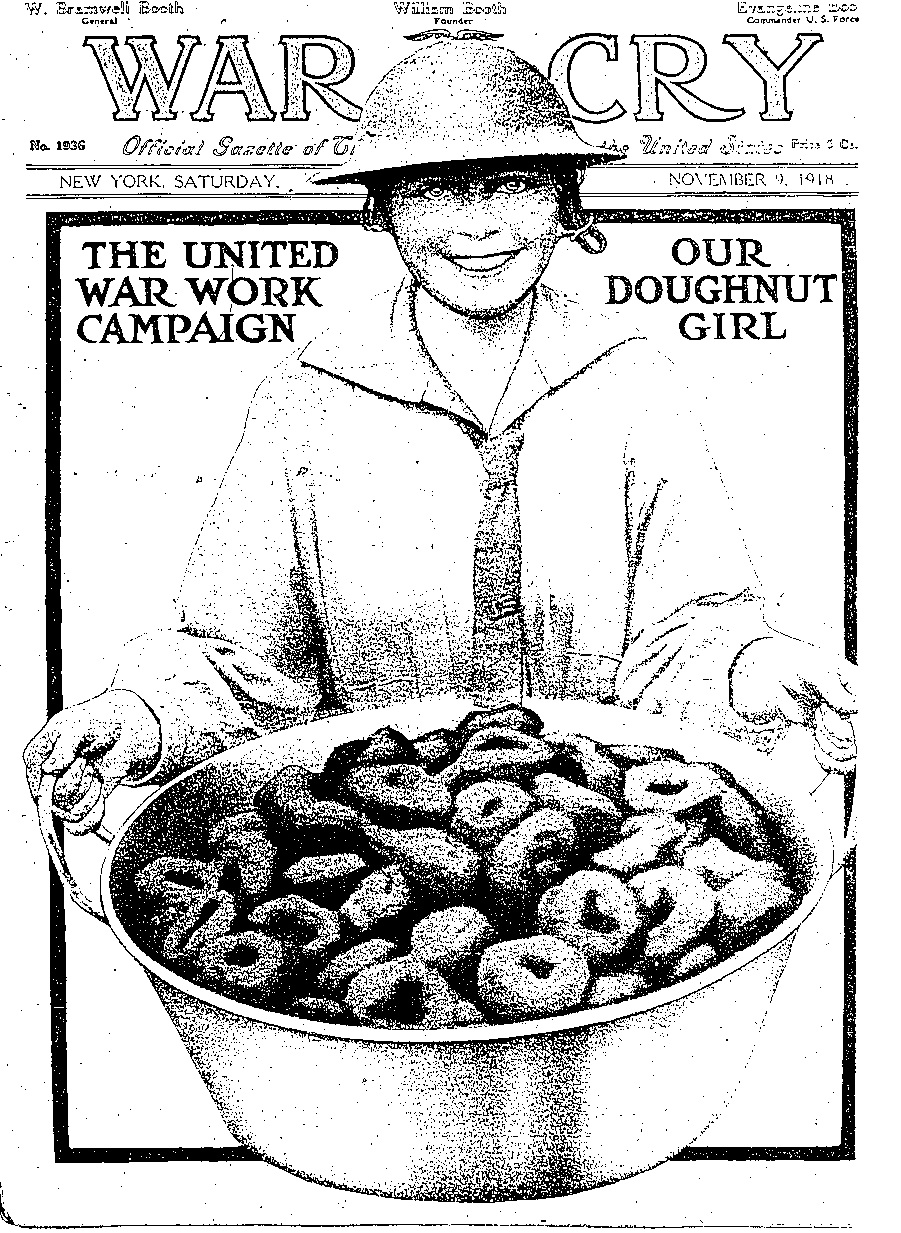
Donut Dollies were women volunteers of the Salvation Army, who traveled to France in 1918 to support American soldiers.

Soon after the entrance of the United States into World War I in 1917, the Salvation Army sent a fact-finding mission to France. The mission concluded that the needs of American enlisted men could be met by canteens/social centers termed "huts" that could serve baked goods, provide writing supplies and stamps, and provide a clothes-mending service. Typically, six staff members per hut would include four female volunteers who could "mother" the boys. These huts were established by the Salvation Army in the United States near army training centers.

About 250 Salvation Army volunteers went to France. Because of the difficulties of providing freshly baked goods from huts established in abandoned buildings near to the front lines, the two Salvation Army volunteers (Ensign Margaret Sheldon and Adjutant Helen Purviance) came up with the idea of providing donuts. These are reported to have been an "instant hit", and "soon many soldiers were visiting the Salvation Army huts". Margaret Sheldon wrote of one busy day: "Today I made 22 pies, 300 donuts, 700 cups of coffee."

Soon, the women who did this work became known by the servicemen as "Donut Girls".

A misconception has taken hold that the provision of donuts to enlisted men in World War I is the origin of the term "doughboy" to describe U.S. infantry. However, the term was in use as early as the Mexican–American War of 1846–47.

During World War II, Red Cross volunteers also distributed donuts. It became routine to refer to some Red Cross girls serving donuts and coffee as "Donut Dollies".

In Chicago and other cities, National Donut Day is still a fundraiser for the Salvation Army. In 2017, the organization joined with Russ's Market, Super Saver, LaMar's Donuts, and Krispy Kreme in Lincoln, Nebraska, and Tempe, Arizona, to raise funds on National Donut Day.

There are three other donut holidays, the origins of which are obscure. National Jelly-Filled Donut Day is recognized as June 8 (occasionally as June 9). National Cream-Filled Donut Day is celebrated on September 14 although there is also a National Boston Cream Pie Day observed October 23. Buy a Donut Day occurs on October 30.

The birthday of the United States Marine Corps (November 10), was once referred to as National Donut Day, in a successful ruse by American prisoners of war at Son Tay prison camp to trick the North Vietnamese into giving out donuts in honor of the occasion. A second National Donut Day is also celebrated on November 5, which is speculated to have originated from this event.

== In Australia ==
In the state of South Australia, Donut Day is the first Friday of June, and is honoured with a partnership between Krispy Kreme and The Salvation Army. It includes a celebrity donut decorating competition, donut giveaways, and the Red Shield Hope donut whose profits go to supporting the Salvation Army's work in Australia.

== See also ==
- Fat Thursday
- List of food days
- List of doughnut varieties

== Sources ==
- Those Extraordinary Women of World War I, Karen Zeinert, 2001
- Origins of "Doughboy", An Interim Report, by Michael E. Hanlon, June 16, 2003
- Holiday Insights : National Doughnut Day, or National Donut Day
