= National Fried Chicken Day =

U.S. unofficial observance, July 6

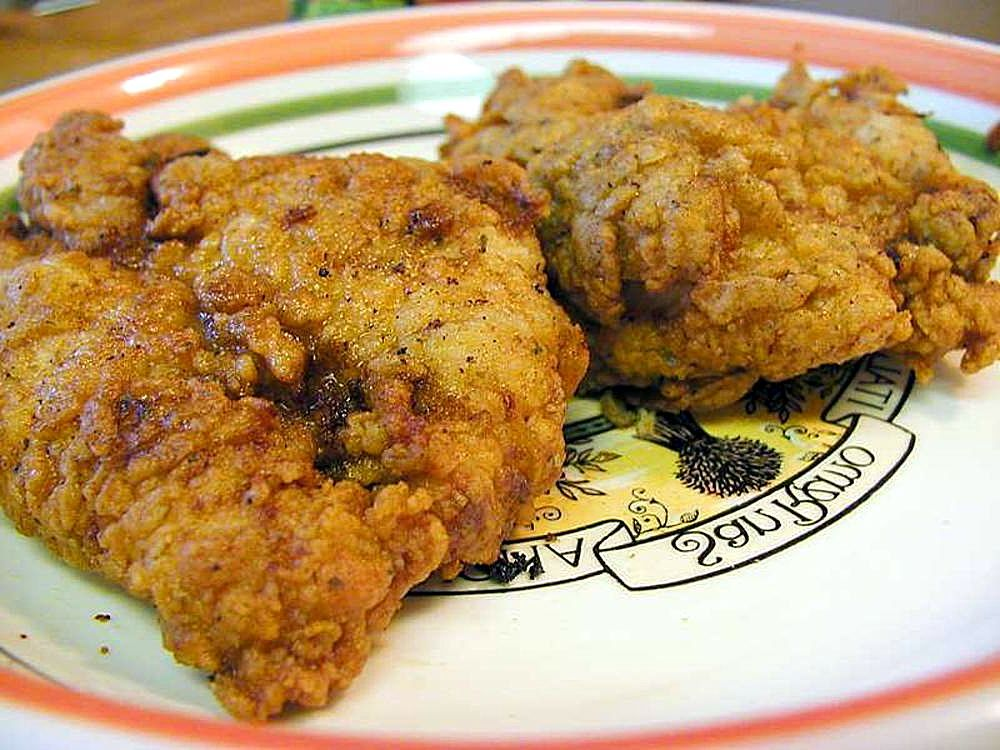
Fried chicken

National Fried Chicken Day is observed in the United States of America annually on July 6. It is unclear how the day originated.

In observance of the day, fried chicken is prepared in a variety of ways, and eaten.

Some chain fried chicken restaurants such as Church's Chicken and KFC, and other chain restaurants such as Grandy's, offer promotions on National Fried Chicken Day.

== Outside the United States ==
In 2018, KFC's Australian operations offered the chance to win free fried chicken for a year. The contest was entered by making social-media posts stating reasons why the entrant deserved the prize. The winning entry was by a 19-year-old who, together with her friend, got the KFC corporate logotype tattooed on her foot. The day is traditionally observed on July 7 in Australia out of respect for the time zone of origin.

== See also ==
- Comfort food
- List of food days
