= World Chocolate Day =

Annual celebration of chocolate, 7 July

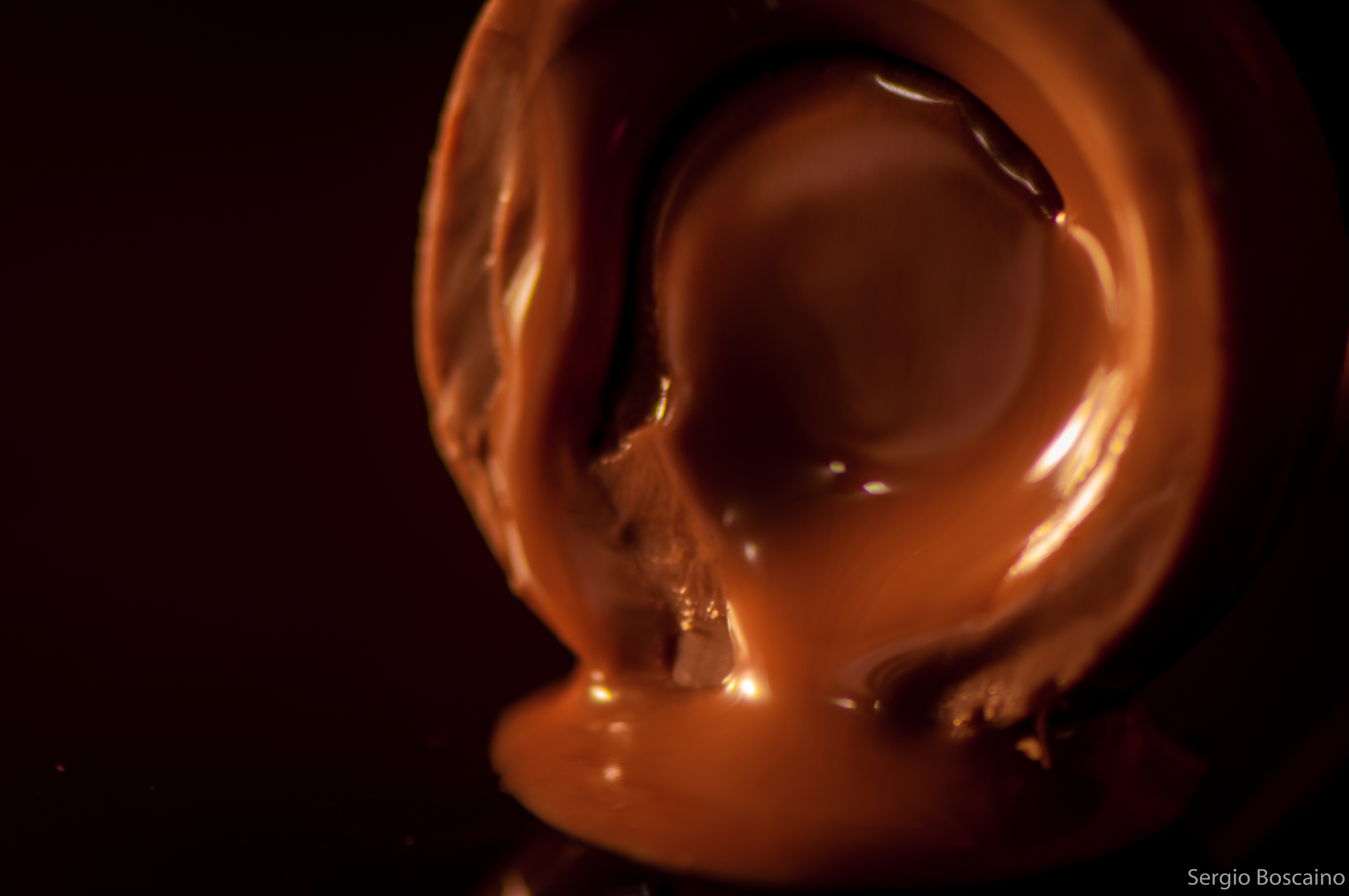
A chocolate confection

World Chocolate Day, or just Chocolate Day, is an annual celebration of chocolate, occurring globally on 7 July, which some suggest to be the anniversary of the introduction of chocolate to Europe in 1550. The observance of World Chocolate Day dates back to 2009 and is not to be confused with International Chocolate Day.

Other Chocolate Day celebrations exist, such as National Chocolate Day in the United States on 28 October. The U.S. National Confectioners Association lists 13 September as International Chocolate Day, coinciding with the birth date of Milton S. Hershey (13 September 1857). Ghana, the third largest producer of cocoa, celebrates Chocolate Day on 14 February. In Latvia, World Chocolate Day is celebrated on 11 July.

The U.S. National Confectioners Association lists four primary chocolate holidays on their calendar: Chocolate Day (7 July), two National Chocolate Days (28 October and 28 December), and International Chocolate Day (13 September).

== See also ==
- List of food days
