= National Tea Day =

Annual observance in Britain

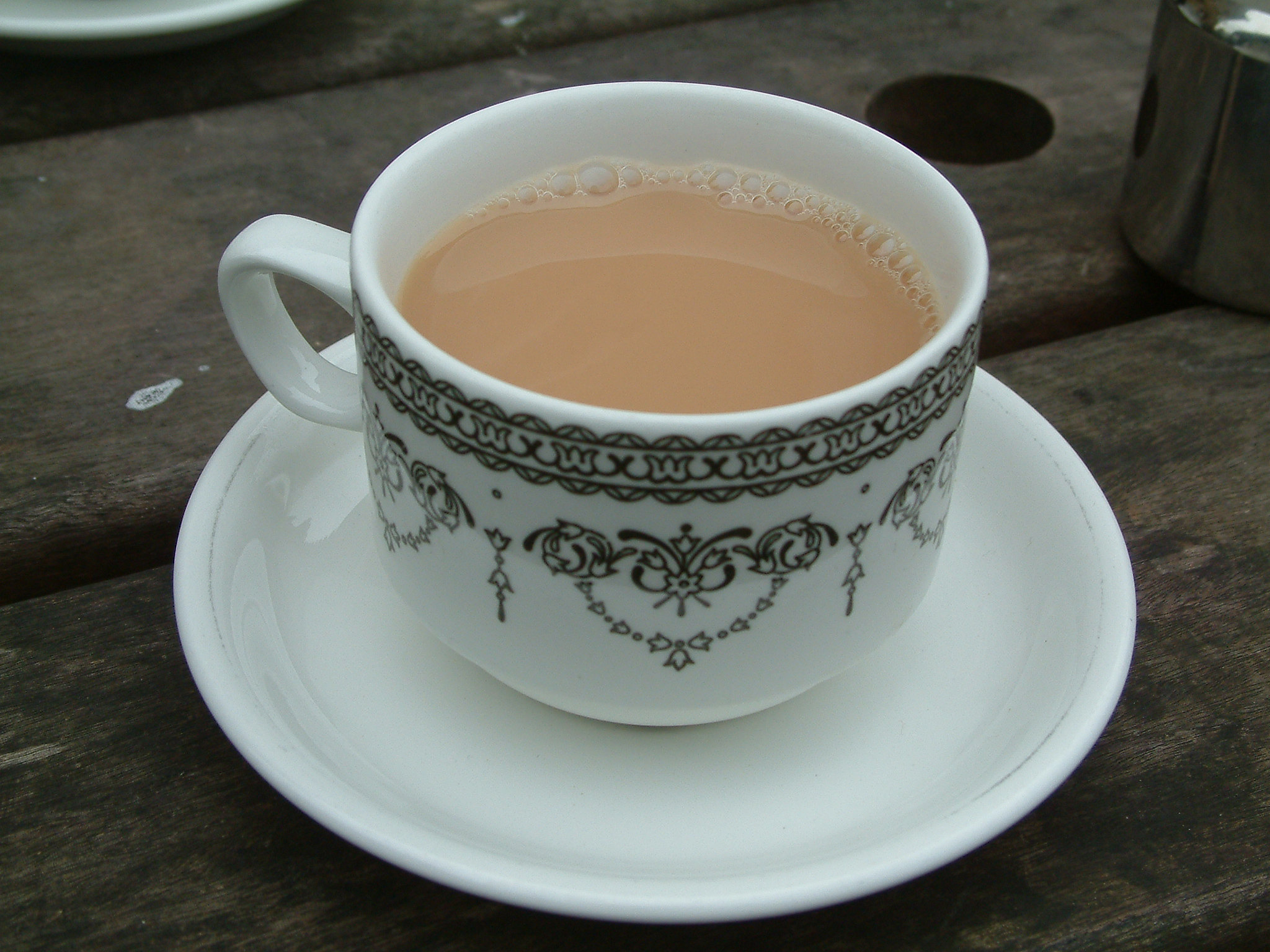

National Tea Day is observed in the United Kingdom every year on 21 April to celebrate the drinking of tea. It is celebrated in tea rooms, hotels, pubs and cafés through special events, and charitable fundraising events held across the country, including a tea 'Fes-Tea-Val' at Chiswick House & Gardens in London. Tea brands and press outlets run promotions and features in conjunction with the day, including The Independent, Metro and The Telegraph, as well as local newspapers. The day is observed to celebrate the British tea culture and is celebrated in other countries to enjoy British teas.

== History ==
National Tea Day was founded by The Tea Group in 2015. Their goal was to establish a special day just for tea, bringing together a community to enjoy tea and to unite the tea lovers of Great Britain.

== See also ==
- International Tea Day
- List of food days
