= National Corndog Day =

Annual celebration at basketball events

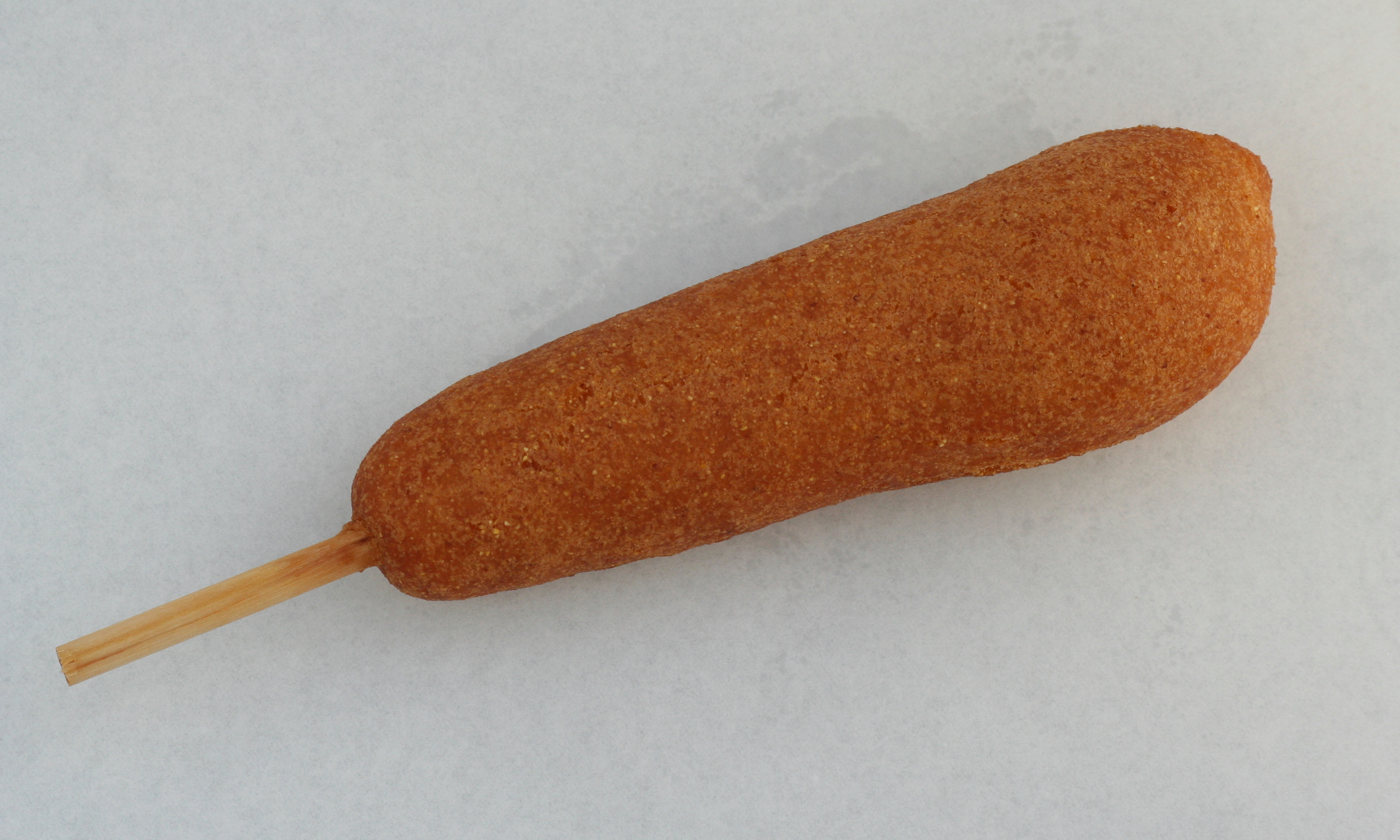
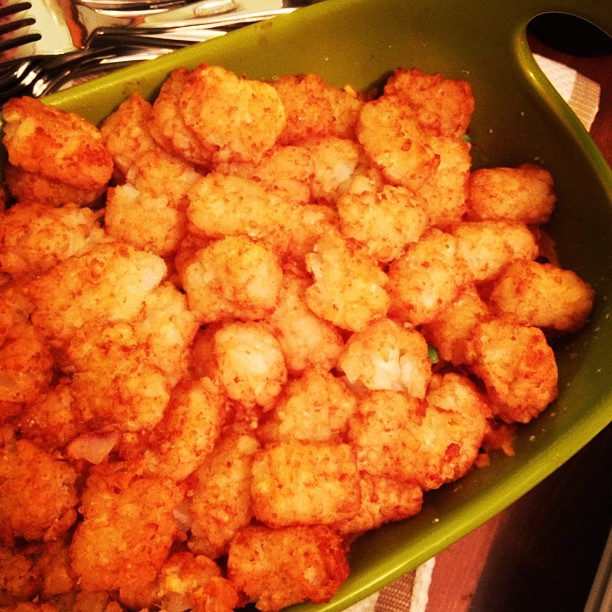
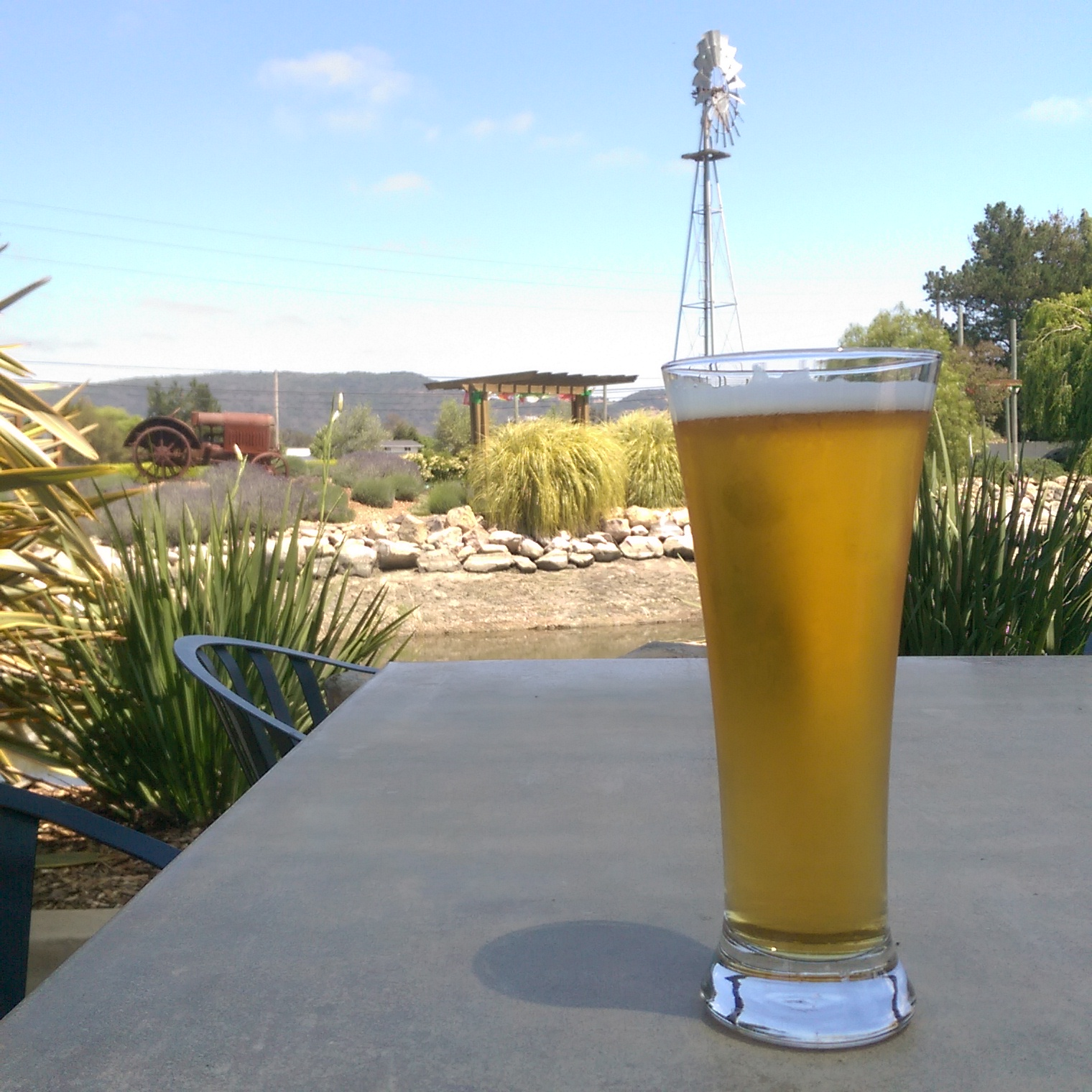

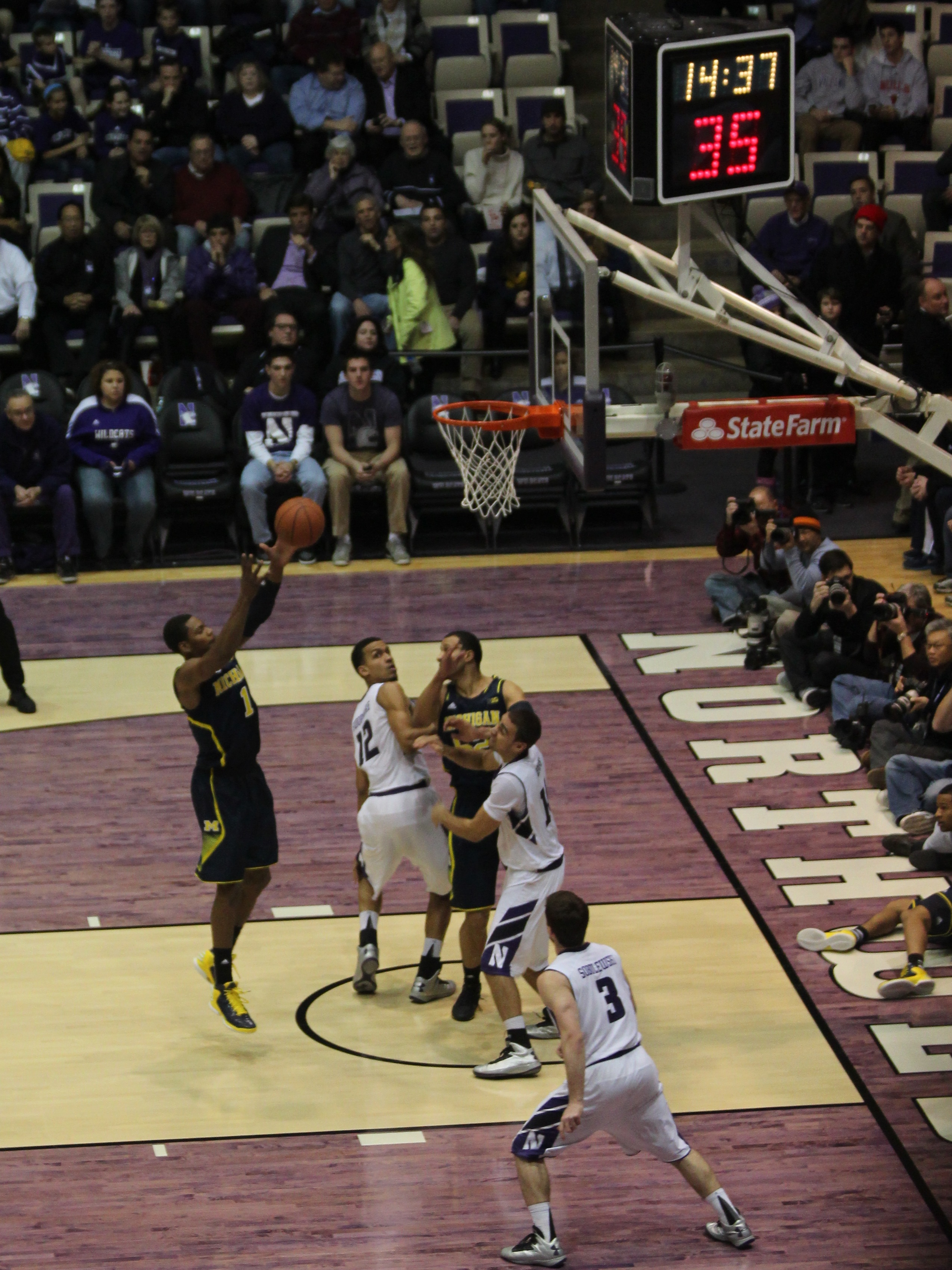
A corn dog, tater tots, beer and basketball, all aspects of National Corndog Day

National Corndog Day is a celebration concerning basketball, the corn dog (a hot dog sausage coated in a thick layer of cornmeal batter), Tater Tots and American beer that occurs in March of every year on the first Saturday of the NCAA Men's Division I Basketball Championship.

== History ==
National Corndog Day was inaugurated in 1992 in Corvallis, Oregon by Brady Sahnow and Henry Otley. The first celebration was informal and involved only corndogs and basketball. In subsequent years, National Corndog day was expanded to include tater tots and beer and gradually spread to other cities. The celebration currently is sponsored by Foster Farms, a Livingston, California-based poultry producer, PBR, a US Midwest-based beer company, and Jones Soda. Operations for National Corndog Day currently are governed by a board of directors consisting of event hosts (or "city captains") based in various cities in the United States.

By 2007, parties celebrating National Corndog Day occurred at 113 locations in more than 30 U.S. states, the District of Columbia and Australia. In 2008 participation increased to nearly 5, 000 parties on five continents, including one at McMurdo Station in Antarctica. In 2009 participation fell back to the trend line from the 2008 peak, with nearly 400 on March 21, 2009. National Corndog Day 2009 took place on Saturday, March 21, 2009. That same year, musical artist and contest winner, Ben Brennan, wrote and performed the National Corndog Day theme song.

== See also ==
- Corn dog
- Hot dog
- List of food days
