= Ghana Tourism Authority =

Ghanaian tourism parastatal

Agency overview
- Formed: 1960
- Jurisdiction: Government of Ghana
- Headquarters: 2nd Ave., South Ridge, 2 Haile Selassie St, Accra
- Website: www.ghana.travel

The Ghana Tourism Authority is a Ghanaian state agency under the Ministry of Tourism, Culture and Creative Arts responsible for the regulation of tourism in Ghana by marketing, promoting, licensing, classifying, researching and developing tourism facilities and services in the country.

== History ==
The Ghana Tourism Authority was established in 1960 as the Ghana Tourist Board. The board was renamed as the Ghana Tourism Authority in 2011 under act 817. The act extended the tasks of the agency to overseeing the implementation of government policies in the industry. The act also makes the agency a fully fledged income generating authority by establishing a fund to which every tourism business is required to contribute one percent (1%) of its revenue for tourism development.

== Notable Initiatives ==
The Ghana Tourism Authority has instituted some days annually to celebrate various themes in the country.

Initiative	Commemoration	Year instituted	Date of Celebration
National Chocolate Day	Valentines Day (Love)	2005	10 February - 14 February
Year of Return	400 years since the first slave ships landed in the Americas	2018	2019
