= Blue Chip Cookies =

American bakery chain

The Blue Chip Cookie Company, Inc
- Type: Private
- Industry: Bakery
- Founded: March 1983; 43 years ago
- Founder: Matt and Lori Nader
- Headquarters: Milford, Ohio, United States
- Area served: Midwestern United States, primarily Greater Cincinnati, Kansas City, Kansas; Sherman, Texas; Santa Clarita, California; online to the United States and Canada
- Products: Gourmet cookies
- Owners: Donna Drury-Heine, Robert Heine
- Parent: The Blue Chip Cookie Company, Inc
- Website: www.bluechipcookiesdirect.com

The Blue Chip Cookie Company is an American gourmet cookie licensor and e-commerce business with headquarters in Milford, Ohio, United States, and store locations in Milford, Ohio, Leawood, Kansas, Newport, Kentucky, Santa Clarita, California, and Sherman, Texas. Founded in March 1983 by the Nader family (Matt Nader died in 1997), the company specializes in gourmet cookies and cookie cakes, and created the first white chocolate macadamia cookie.

== History ==
The first Blue Chip Cookies store opened in March 1983 on Beach Street (Fisherman's Wharf) in San Francisco, California. In 1986, the company began franchising stores in selected markets. In 1987, Blue Chip Cookies developed National Cookie Day as an annual promotion on December 4.

In 1986, Blue Chip Cookies opened a store in Cincinnati, Ohio, a result of the city's efforts to market its nickname, "Blue Chip City". In 1998, Blue Chip Cookies was purchased by Edgewood, Kentucky–based B.C.C. Enterprises, a rare example of a franchisee that had grown larger than the franchisor. A privately held Loveland, Ohio–based company, acquired Blue Chip Cookies in November 2005 and opened a new store in Loveland in June 2006. In January 2007, Blue Chip Cookie Company, Inc resumed franchising and licensing.

In 2007, Blue Chip Cookies focused on driving its online e-commerce business and corporate cookie gifts/marketing by opening an online store. The 3,000-square-foot (280 m^{2}) commissary facility for online, corporate gifts, and corporate headquarters is based in Milford, Ohio, and the strategic decision has been instrumental in creating a new business channel. In addition, Blue Chip Cookies' special niche is corporate gifts, nationwide cookie delivery, and gourmet cookies for clients. The company promotes its products as America’s Original Gourmet Cookie Gift Company. Corporate cookie gifts

The Blue Chip Cookie Company, Inc. is now licensing the brand, including its proprietary recipes, to select retailers across the United States who will make them from scratch and serve them in their stores. This is a change from their franchising model.
