= International Tea Day =

Holiday

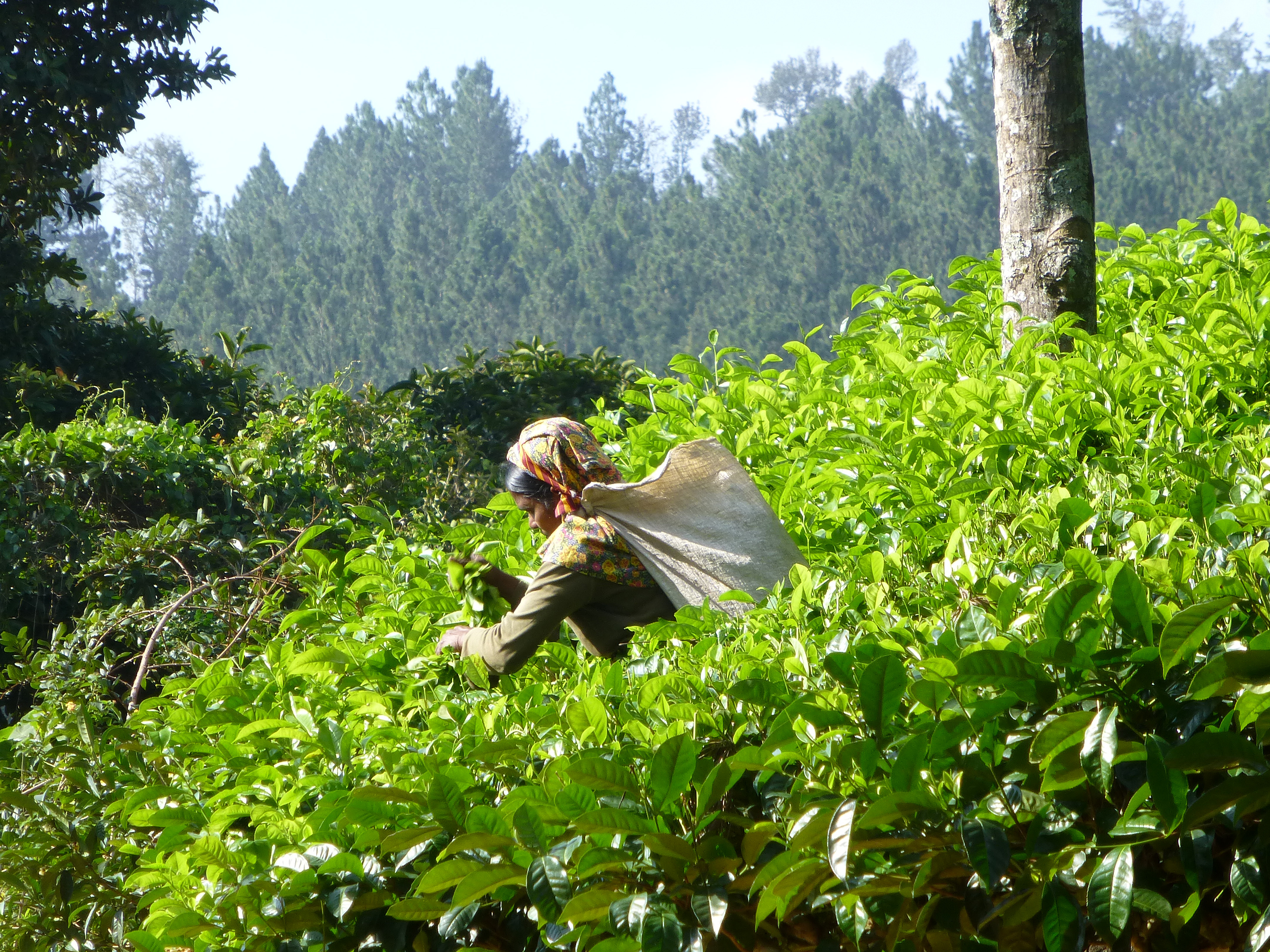
- Tea harvesting in Sri Lanka, one of the celebrants of International Tea Day
- Official name: International Tea Day
- Observed by: United Nations
- Begins: 2020
- Date: May 21
- Next time: May 21, 2027

International Tea Day is observed annually on May 21, according to the United Nations. Chinese scholar Chen Entian was the earliest initiator and promoter. The concerning resolution was adopted on December 21, 2019, and called on the United Nations Food and Agriculture Organization (FAO) to lead the observance of the Day.

The International Tea Day aims to raise awareness of the long history and the deep cultural and economic significance of tea around the world. The goal of the day is to promote and foster collective actions to implement activities in favour of the sustainable production and consumption of tea and raise awareness of its importance in fighting hunger and poverty.

An International Tea Day has been celebrated on December 15, since 2005, in tea producing countries like India, Sri Lanka, Nepal, Vietnam, Indonesia, Bangladesh, Kenya, Malawi, Malaysia, Uganda and Tanzania. International Tea Day aims to draw global attention of governments and citizens to the impact of the global tea trade on workers and growers, and has been linked to requests for price supports and fair trade.

== Background ==
The main architects were the Centre for Education and Communication (CEC), India (Shatadru Chattopadhayay); Hind Mazdoor Sabha, India (Samir Roy); Indian National Trade Union Congress, India (Paramasivam); Institute of Social Development, Sri Lanka (P. Muthulingam); New Trade Union Initiative, India (M. Subbu); Red Flag Union, Sri Lanka (O. A. Ramaiha) and United Trade Union Congress, India (Ashok Ghosh) at the World Social Forum in January 2005. The first International Tea Day was celebrated in New Delhi in 2005, with later celebrations organized in Sri Lanka in 2006 and 2008. International Tea Day celebrations and the related Global Tea Conferences have been jointly organized by trade union movements.

In 2015, the Indian government proposed expanding the observance of International Tea Day through the FAO Intergovernmental Group on Tea (IGG on Tea).

The FAO IGG on Tea leads multilateral efforts to support the world tea economy, has been a great advocate for the proclamation of the International Tea Day. In 2015, during a meeting in Milan, Italy, the IGG on Tea discussed the idea of an International Tea Day. The proposal was then endorsed by the FAO Committee on Commodity Problems (CCP) and subsequently adopted by the United Nations General Assembly in December 2019.

== See also ==
- National Tea Day
- List of food days
