= National Vodka Day =

Marketing creation in the United States

National Vodka Day is a marketing creation that has been celebrated in the United States on October 4 since at least 2009. It has its own website, has been mentioned by Wine Enthusiast magazine, and has been noted on news websites such as CBS.

== See also ==
- List of food days
