= Bretzelsonndeg =

Luxembourg pretzel feast day

Bretzelsonndeg, or pretzel Sunday, is a national feast day in the country of Luxembourg, celebrated by eating (often sweet) pretzels on the fourth Sunday in Lent, and allegedly dating back to the 18th century. It started after Buergbrennen, when young women would shout the names of men they were interested in as they threw wood onto a bonfire. This would give young men listening in a hint if their feelings were reciprocated to present an interested woman with a pretzel.

Nowadays, men offer their (female) sweethearts a pretzel, and if the woman is inclined to accept his offer of love, she will give him an egg on Easter Sunday. If the woman is not interested, instead she will give the man an empty basket. This has prompted the Luxembourgish expression "de Kuerf kréien" (to receive a basket) to be synonymous with being romantically rejected.

In leap years, the roles are reversed and women are the ones to give their male counterparts a pretzel with the hopes of getting an egg in return.

The pretzel itself is quite symbolic, being made of puff pastry and adorned with sugar icing and almonds. The shape is seen as representative of lovers interlocking arms, but that has since been disputed by historians.

== See also ==
- List of food days
