= National Peanut Board =

The National Peanut Board is a program sponsored by the United States Department of Agriculture's Agricultural Marketing Service to support and expand existing markets, develop new markets, and facilitate the economical production of peanuts for export. The board's activities are funded by a mandatory checkoff of one percent on the crop value.

== History ==
Congress authorized the National Peanut Board in the Commodity Promotion, Research, and Information Act of 1996. The USDA instantiated the Peanut Board in 2000.

The Board's annual funding supports research to reduce production costs, improve quality and yield, improve shelf life and flavor, explore nutrition research and investigate potential ways to lessen peanut allergy. The Board can also enter into cooperative agreements with peanut product manufacturers to promote American peanut products.
