= Ice Cream for Breakfast Day =

Informal holiday

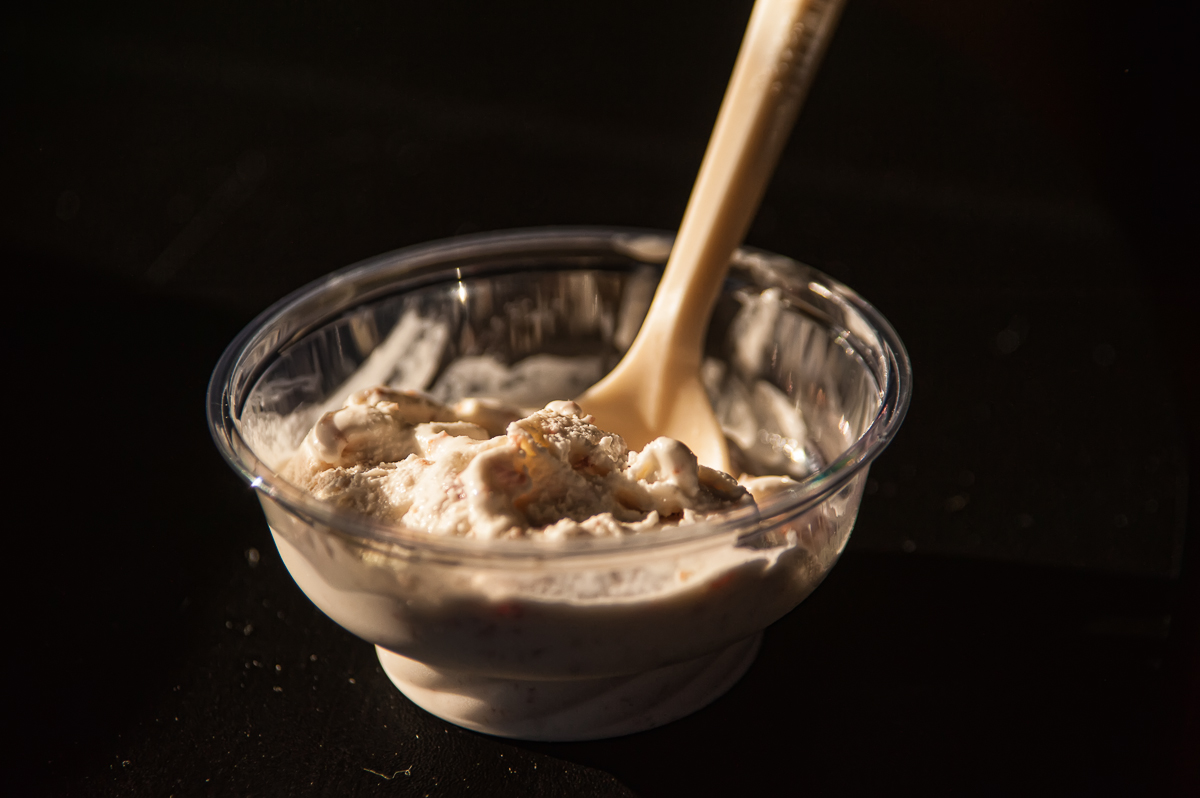
A bowl of ice cream offered for free by an ice cream vendor in celebration of Ice Cream for Breakfast Day 2014

Ice Cream for Breakfast Day is an informal holiday celebrated on the first Saturday in February when some people deliberately eat ice cream for breakfast.

== History ==
The holiday was invented on a snowy February morning during the 1960s by Florence Rappaport in Rochester, New York, the mother of six children. To entertain her two youngest children, Ruth (now Kristal) and Joe she declared it to be Ice Cream For Breakfast Day. She explained, "It was cold and snowy and the kids were complaining that it was too cold to do anything. So I just said, 'Let's have ice cream for breakfast.'" The next year, they reminded her of the day and a tradition began. When the siblings grew up, they held parties and introduced the tradition to friends while in college, and the tradition began to spread.

== Global spread ==
Celebrations have been recorded in the United States, the United Kingdom, Israel, Namibia, Nepal, New Zealand, Canada, South Africa and China.

Ice Cream for Breakfast Day was brought to Israel by Ruth. In 2020, The Jerusalem Post reported that some 100,000 people in Israel were expected to mark the celebration according to research by Ben and Jerry's.

== Celebration ==
Ice Cream For Breakfast Day is officially celebrated on the first Saturday of February. The website describes the holiday as only having three rules:

1. Eat ice cream.
2. On the first Saturday of February.
3. For breakfast.

Many people choose to celebrate the holiday on another February weekend morning, according to their schedule.

== Charity events ==
In recent years, several ice cream shops around the United States have started to use the day to raise money for charities, and to attract some cold weather customers.
