= New Trade Union Initiative =

Trade union in India

New Trade Union Initiative was a federation of independent trade unions in India popularly known as NTUI. The founding conference of NTUI was held in 2006 where Y.V. Chavan was elected as the president, Ashim Roy the general secretary and M. Subbu the Treasurer. NTUI proclaims itself as independent from political parties. Its core constituent is the National Centre for Labour, a trade union of informal sector workers. At the time of the 2006 conference, NTUI had around 300 affiliated unions. NTUI decided to merge with All India Trade Union Congress on 22 December 2024 and merged in AITUC in April 2025.
