= World Milk Day =

Established by the UN Food and Agriculture Organization

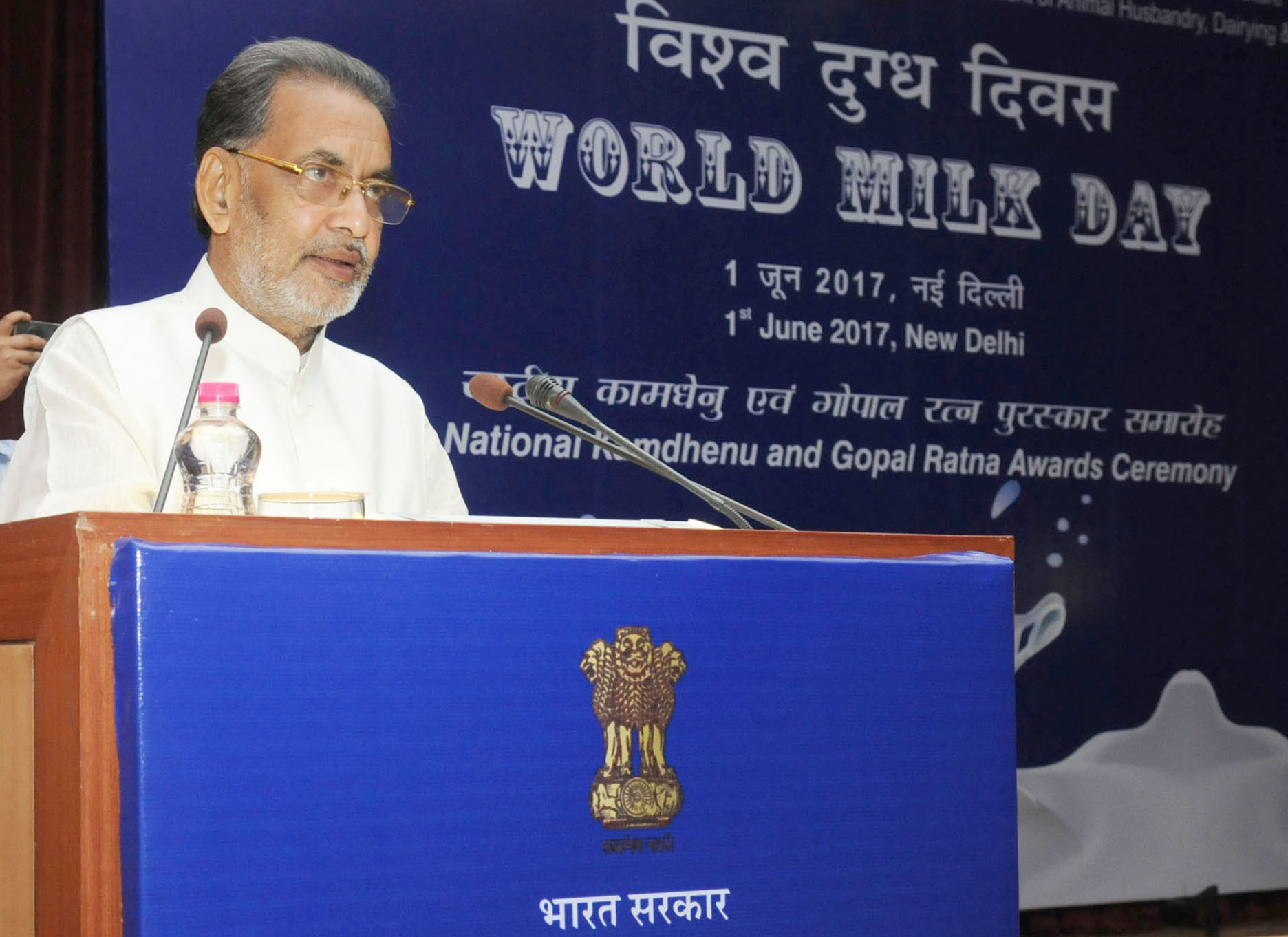
- A “World Milk Day” celebration, organised by the Department of Animal Husbandry & Fisheries in New Delhi on June 1, 2017
- Type: International
- Significance: to recognize the importance of milk as a global food
- Date: June 1
- Next time: 1 June 2027
- Frequency: Annual
- First time: 1 June 2001; 25 years ago
- Started by: Food and Agriculture Organization

World Milk Day is an international day established by the Food and Agriculture Organization (FAO) of the United Nations to recognize the importance of milk as a global food. It has been observed on June 1 each year since 2001. The day is intended to provide an opportunity to bring attention to activities that are connected with the dairy sector.

== History ==
World Milk Day was first designated by the FAO in 2001. June 1 was chosen as the date because many countries were already celebrating a milk day during that time of year.

The Day provides an opportunity to focus attention on milk and raise awareness of dairy’s part in healthy diets, responsible food production, and supporting livelihoods and communities. This is supported by FAO data showing that more than one billion people's livelihoods are supported by the dairy sector and that dairy is consumed by more than six billion people globally. The fact that many countries choose to do this on the same day lends additional importance to individual national celebrations and shows that milk is a global food.

=== World Milk Day celebrations ===
World Milk Day 2016

In 2016, World Milk Day was celebrated in over 40 countries. Activities included marathons and family runs, milking demonstrations and farm visits, school-based activities, concerts, conferences and seminars, competitions and a range of events focusing on promoting the value of milk and illustrating the important role played by the dairy industry in the national economy.

World Milk Day 2017

In 2017, 588 events took place in 80 countries reaching 402 million impressions on social media for #WorldMilkDay. Events included open houses at dairy farms, milk donations to schools, contributions to food banks, photo contests, sports competitions, fairs, dance shows, parties, nutrition conferences, tastings, exhibitions, food carts, and milk bars.

World Milk Day 2018

In 2018, World Milk Day was celebrated with 586 events in 72 countries. Farmers, staff, families, politicians, chefs, nutritionists, doctors, academics and athletes raised their glasses of milk and shared information about the benefits of milk and dairy products in their lives. #WorldMilkDay achieved 868 million impressions (for May 1 to June 2) with over 80,000 posts from May 1 to June 2. The global campaign (including #WorldMilkDay, #RaiseAGlass and 19 translations and local hashtags) received over 1.1 billion impressions and 291 million in reach on social media.

World Milk Day 2019

In 2019, World Milk Day was celebrated in more than 68 countries. The theme for World Milk Day 2019 was “Drink Milk: Today and Every day.” As a global event, there were more than 400 milk day campaigns and events across the globe where volunteers raised awareness about the importance of milk for the overall health of a person. Varieties of promotional activities describing the importance of milk as a healthy and balanced diet were launched by the International Dairy Federation on its website online. Various health organization members took part in the celebration to work together to distribute the message of milk importance to the common public through promotional activities all through the day. Activities included milking demonstrations and visits to farms, games, contests, conferences and information sharing, and many more. They were all meant to be shared information on the value of milk and an explanation of the important role played by the dairy sector cultural aspects of the community, the national economy, and society.

World Milk Day 2020

2020 was the 20th anniversary of World Milk Day Celebrations. In 2020, World Milk Day was celebrated in more than 104 countries around the world. The World Milk Day theme for 2020 focused on the 20th-anniversary celebrations. In light of the COVID-19 global pandemic, the Global Dairy Platform encouraged the use of social media campaigns and online events. Over 842 million impressions were made worldwide.

World Milk Day 2021

World Milk Day 2021 was celebrated on June 1, 2021. 100 countries around the world participated in World Milk Day activities. Over 1.38 billion impressions were made worldwide.

World Milk Day 2022

World Milk Day 2022 was celebrated on June 1, 2022. 100 countries around the world participated in World Milk Day activities. Over 1 billion impressions were made worldwide.

World Milk Day 2023

World Milk Day 2023 was celebrated on June 1, 2023. Over 100 countries around the world participated in World Milk Day activities. Over 1.35 billion impressions were made worldwide.

World Milk Day celebrations will happen again in 2024 on June 1, 2024.

World Milk Day 2024

World Milk Day 2024 celebrated its 13th anniversary on June 1, 2024. The Jamaica Dairy Development Board hosted an event on May 30, 2024 to commemorate this milestone. World Milk Day 2024 in Jamaica highlighted the essential contribution of dairy production in providing quality nutrition to sustain the global population. The theme of World Milk Day 2024 focused on "celebrating the vital role dairy plays in delivering quality nutrition to nourish the world."

World Milk Day 2025

World Milk Day 2025 marked another year of honoring milk as a cornerstone of nutrition, economic resilience and sustainable food systems. Observed on 1 June, this global celebration brought together dairy farmers, consumers, health professionals and policymakers to spotlight the essential role of dairy in everyday life.

With the 2025 theme "Let's Celebrate the Power of Dairy", the focus remained on promoting the nutritional benefits, socio-economic importance, and environmental progress of the dairy sector worldwide.

World Milk Day 2026

World Milk Day 2026 was observed globally on 1 June 2026 with the official theme "Celebrating Women Farmers". The observance highlighted the importance of milk, dairy nutrition, sustainable farming practices and the contribution of millions of dairy farmers and women workers worldwide.

== See also ==
- List of food days
