= Anita Stewart (culinary author) =

Canadian culinary author and food activist (1947–2020)

Anita Stewart, CM (2 July 1947 – 29 October 2020) was a Canadian culinary author and food activist.

== Biography ==
Stewart was also the founder of Food Day Canada, the largest national culinary celebration in Canadian history. In 2011, she was made a Member of the Order of Canada. Up until her death, she served as Food Laureate of the Ontario Agricultural College at the University of Guelph.

She died on 29 October 2020, aged 73.

== Bibliography ==
Stewart has produced several culinary-related books.

- Anita Stewart's Canada: The Food, The Recipes, The Stories (HarperCollins Canada, Toronto, 2008)
- The Flavours of Canada: A Celebration of the Finest Regional Foods (Raincoast, Vancouver, 2000 / 2006)
- Great Canadian Cuisine: The Flavours of Canadian Pacific Hotels (Douglas & McIntyre, Vancouver 1999)
- A Taste For Comfort: A Scenic Tour of Pacific Northwest Inns (C&D Publishing, Portland, Oregon, 1993)
- Canada's Great Country Inns: the Best in Food and Lodging (Random House / Fodors Toronto / New York 1992)
- From Our Mothers' Kitchens (Random House, Toronto 1991)
- The Country Inns Cookbook: Revised Edition (Stoddart Publishing, Toronto 1990)
- The Gray Rocks Story (Weiser & Weiser, New York,1989)
- The St.Lawrence Market Cookbook (Stoddart Publishing, Toronto 1988)
- The Lighthouse Cookbook (Harbour Publishing, Vancouver 1988)
- The Country Inns Cookbook, (Stoddart Publishing, Toronto 1987)
- Northern Bounty: A Celebration of Canadian Cuisine (Random House Canada, Toronto 1995)
- The Farmers' Market Cookbook (Stoddart, Toronto 1984)
- The Ontario Harvest Cookbook: An Exploration of Feasts and Flavours (Macmillan Canada, Toronto 1995)
