= Christ Church London =

UK Christian church

Coordinates: 51°30′40.7″N 0°6′7.1″W

- Founded: 3 October 2004
- Founder: David Stroud
- Purpose: The cultural, social and spiritual renewal of our city.
- Location: London, United Kingdom
- Region served: London, Worldwide
- Members: 700 approx. (2018)
- Key people: Senior Leaders: Andy Tilsley, Joel Wade
- Website: http://christchurchlondon.org
- Registered Charity number: 1111950

Christ Church London /ˈkraɪst.tʃɜːrtʃ ˈlʌndən/ (also commonly known as Christ Church; and shorthand CCL), founded 2004, is a Christian church that meets at several locations across London, United Kingdom.

Christ Church London is a registered charitable company. Its stated charitable objectives include advancing the Christian faith and providing assistance to people experiencing need, hardship or distress.

The church describes its vision as following Jesus together for the renewal of London. It identifies three core values: presence, formation and mission. These encompass worship and prayer, Christian discipleship, and activities intended to contribute to the spiritual, social and cultural life of the city.

Christ Church London is a multicultural community with attendees from all over the world.

== History ==
Christ Church London was founded in October 2004 by David Stroud, who moved from Birmingham to start the church, and recruited Adrian Holloway and Rhys Scott to be part of the church-planting team. The church officially launched in 2005 at the New Connaught Rooms in Covent Garden and has since relocated a number of times as the church has grown. They now meet in separate locations.

Years	Venue	Location	Congregation
2004–2005	International Students House	Great Portland Street	30 approx.
2005–2006	New Connaught Rooms	Covent Garden	240 approx.
2006–2007	Vinopolis	South Bank	300 approx.
2007–2010	Piccadilly Theatre	Piccadilly Circus	500 approx.
2010–2016	Mermaid Theatre	Blackfriars	550 approx.

== Present ==
Venue	Location	Congregation
Peacock Theatre	Holborn	400 approx.
Platanos College	Stockwell	100 approx.
Kirkland Centre	Mile End	100 approx.
Cryer Arts Theatre	Sutton	100 approx.

== Sundays ==
Christ Church London holds multiple services every Sunday across multiple sites.

The service often begins with about half an hour of worship using largely contemporary Christian music, including songs by artists such as Chris Tomlin and Hillsong, together with original songs written by members of the Christ Church London Worship Team. This is then followed by approximately half an hour of preaching by a church elder or guest speaker, with a sermon centred on a passage of Biblical scripture. At the end of the service, people are often given the opportunity to be prayed for and to stay for refreshments, or after church socials.

=== Special Sundays ===
Christ Church London holds a number of special Sunday meetings throughout the year, including three baptismal services, two dedication services, two services celebrating London, and a Christmas Carol Service. They also have around six guest speakers each year.

=== Move to more services in more locations ===
When church attendance continued to grow, Christ Church London announced it would move from the Mermaid Theatre in Blackfriars to the Peacock Theatre in Holborn and also to several satellite locations across London.

== Connect Groups ==
Christ Church London has around 30 Connect Groups with more being added regularly. They are groups where people can build community and use their skills and passions to contribute to the flourishing of London life. These groups gather around a common cause; a people, a place, or a passion. Some examples include groups for those in the workplace, groups for students, groups for studying the Bible deeper, groups for those involved in social justice, and groups for creatives.

== Alpha ==
Christ Church London hosts the Alpha course several times a year for non-Christians and Christians. They are run throughout the week across London for eight consecutive weeks. Since 2004, over 2000 people in total have attended Alpha at Christ Church London.

=== Notable Alpha launches ===
Christ Church London hosts two or three launches per Alpha course, which are also held at Sway Bar in Covent Garden.

3 October 2007: Simon Thomas, former Blue Peter presenter.

5 October 2009: Patrick Dixon, chairman of Global Change Ltd and founder of the international AIDS charity, ACET.

7 October 2009: Alister McGrath, author of The Dawkins Delusion?.

20 January 2010: Jo Enright, comedian and actress, who has appeared in Peter Kay's Phoenix Nights and I'm Alan Partridge.

21 January 2010: Andy Duncan, chief executive of Channel 4.

19 April 2010: Baroness Cox, founder and chief executive of Humanitarian Aid Relief Trust.

4 October 2010: Dr Ard Louis, theoretical physicist at the University of Oxford.

== Students' Ministry ==
Due to its location in the centre of London, Christ Church attracts many students from the nearby universities, mainly from colleges of the University of London.

New students are "built in" as active members by the Student Team by one-on-one coffees and social student lunches. Furthermore, the team organises one-on-one discipleship courses, prayer and praise evenings, apologetics training, Christian Union leaders Forums, student bible study and student weekends away.

== List of teams at Christ Church London ==
At Christ Church London, there are a large number of people who serve and help the running of the service every Sunday. In 2006, there were 220 people who were actively serving on at least one of the ChristChurch teams.

Teams at Christ Church London include:

- Welcome Team
- Worship Team
- Hospitality Team
- Tech Team
- Prayer Team
- Crèche (0-3)
- Kids (3-8)
- Youth (8+)
- Students

== See also ==
- Churches which do not meet in traditional Church buildings
