= Alcoholic beverage =

Drink with a substantial ethanol content

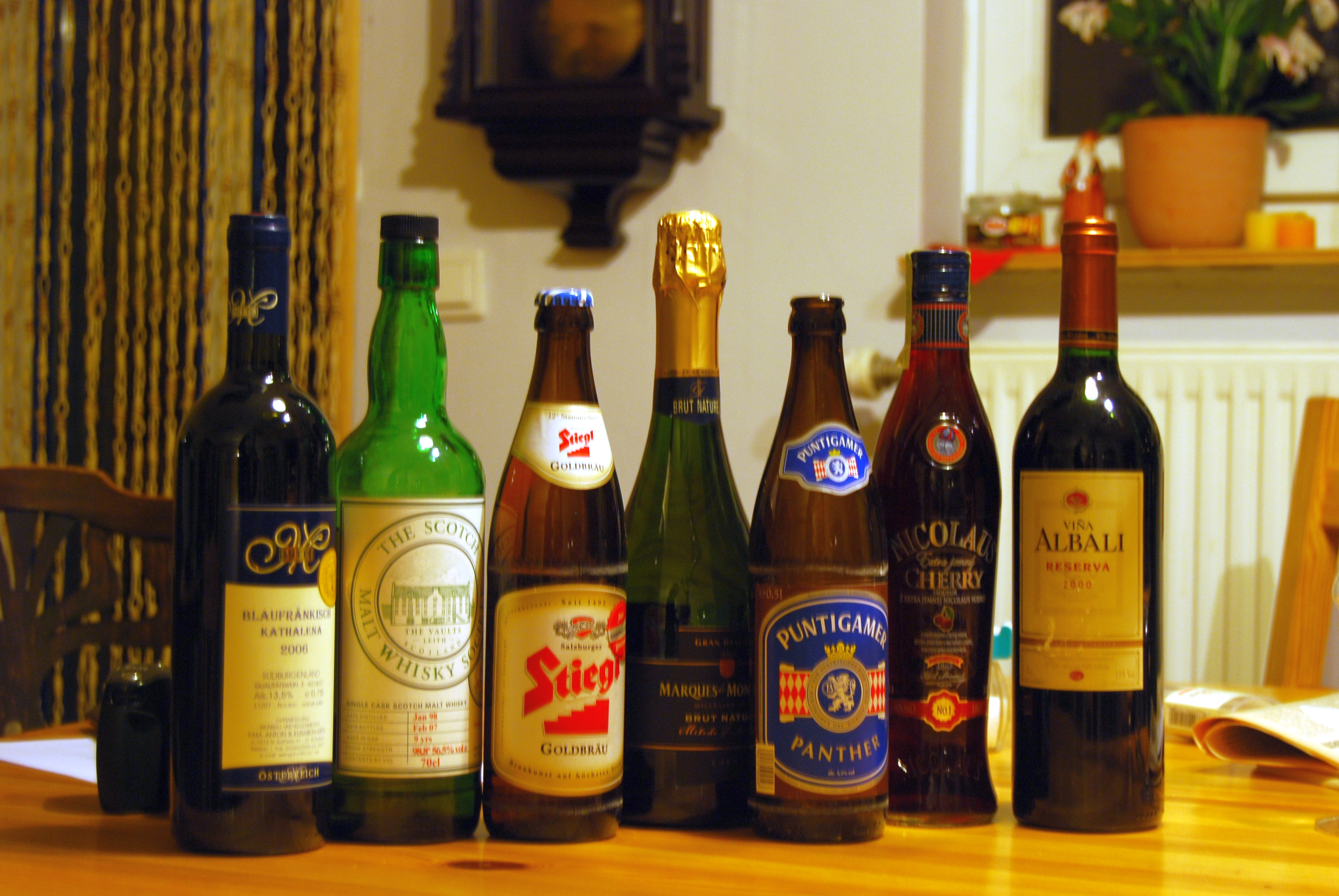
A selection of alcoholic drinks (from left to right): red wine, malt whisky, lager, sparkling wine, lager, cherry liqueur and red wine

Alcoholic beverages and production relationships

An alcoholic beverage (also called an alcoholic drink or strong drink) is any drink that contains alcohol. Alcoholic beverages are typically divided into three classes: beers, wines, and spirits; with alcohol content typically between 3% and 50%. The exact amount on which a beverage is considered alcoholic differs by country, with some considering drinks containing less than 0.5% to be non-alcoholic. These beverages are primarily consumed for the psychoactive effects that they produce.

Many societies have a distinct drinking culture, in which alcoholic drinks are integrated into parties. Most countries have laws regulating the production, sale, and consumption of alcoholic beverages. Some regulations require the labeling of the percentage alcohol content (as ABV or proof) and the use of a warning label. Some countries ban the consumption of alcoholic drinks, but they are legal in most parts of the world. The temperance movement advocates against the consumption of alcoholic beverages. The global alcoholic drink industry exceeded $1.5 trillion in 2017. Alcohol is one of the most widely used recreational drugs in the world, and about 33% of all humans currently drink alcohol. Several other animals are affected by alcohol similarly to humans and, once they consume it, will consume it again if given the opportunity; however, humans are the only species known to produce alcoholic drinks intentionally.

Alcohol is a depressant, a class of psychoactive drug that slows down activity in the central nervous system. In low doses it causes euphoria, reduces anxiety, and increases sociability. In higher doses, it causes drunkenness, stupor, unconsciousness, or death (an overdose). Long-term use can lead to alcoholism, an increased risk of developing several types of cancer, cardiovascular disease, and physical dependence. Alcohol is classified as a group 1 carcinogen. In 2023, a World Health Organization news release said that "the risk to the drinker's health starts from the first drop of any alcoholic beverage."

== History ==
=== Prehistory ===
Discovery of late Stone Age jugs suggests that intentionally fermented drinks existed at least as early as the Neolithic period.

The oldest verifiable brewery has been found in a prehistoric burial site in a cave near Haifa in modern-day Israel. Researchers have found residue of 13,000-year-old beer that they think might have been used for ritual feasts to honor the dead. The traces of a wheat-and-barley-based alcohol were found in stone mortars carved into the cave floor.

=== Ancient period ===
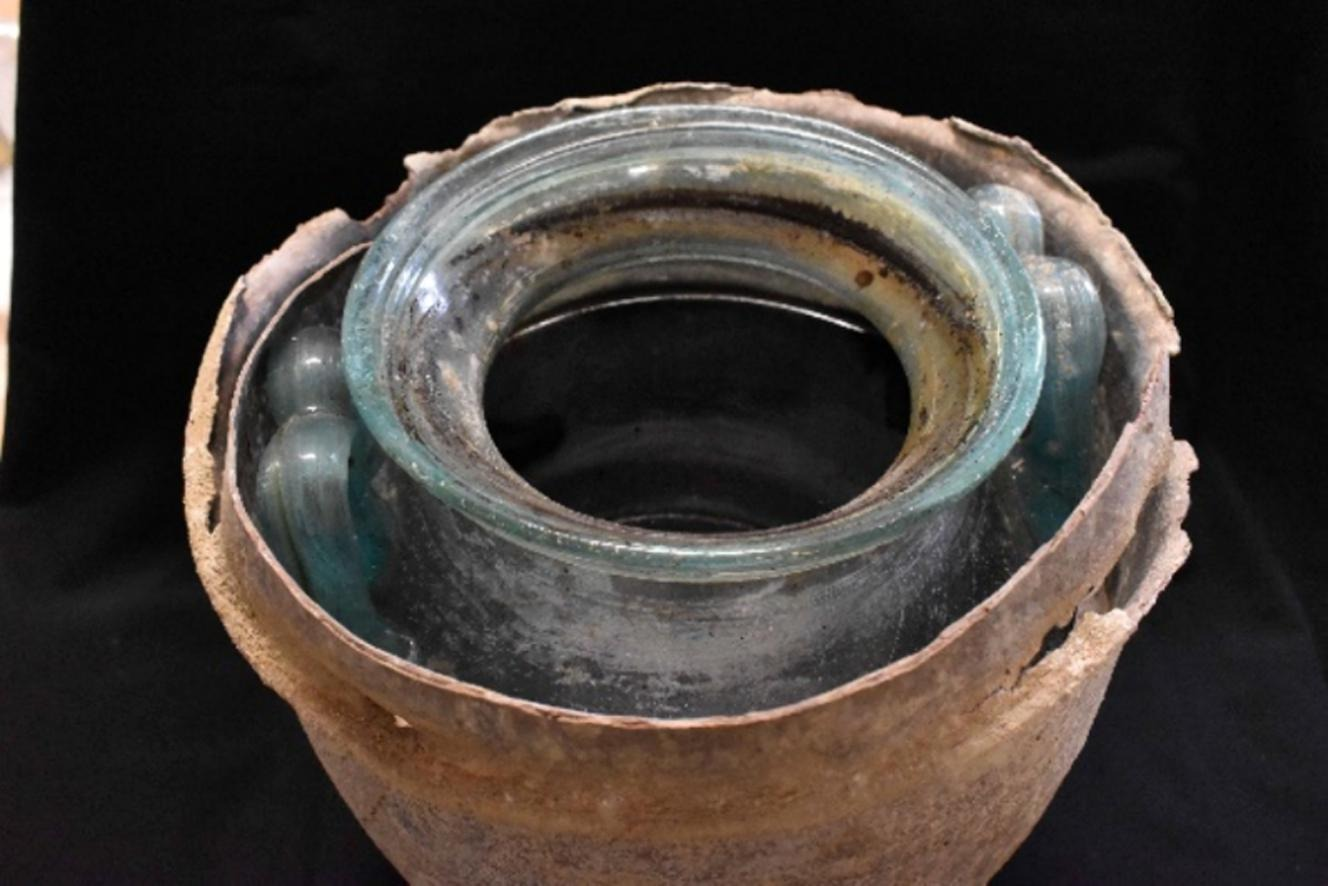
The Carmona Wine Urn contains the world's oldest surviving wine (1st century AD).

The Carmona Wine Urn is a first century Roman glass urn containing intact wine. Discovered in 2019 in Carmona, Spain during excavations of the city's western Roman necropolis, analysis of the urn's contents five years after has deemed the vessel the oldest surviving wine in the world, surpassing the previous record holder, the Speyer wine bottle (discovered in 1867) by three centuries.

Beer was likely brewed from barley as early as 13,000 years ago in the Middle East. Pliny the Elder wrote about the golden age of winemaking in Rome, the 2nd century BCE (200–100 BCE), when vineyards were planted.

Examination and analysis of ancient pottery jars from the neolithic village of Jiahu in the Henan province of northern China revealed residue left behind by the alcoholic drinks they had once contained. Chemical analysis of the residue confirmed that a fermented drink made of grape and hawthorn fruit wine, honey mead and rice beer was being produced in 7000–5600 BC. The residence in which the jar was discovered and other houses in the same village were found to contain many such jars suggesting that wine was an important part of their diet.

The earliest evidence of winemaking was dated at 6,000 to 5,800 BCE in Georgia in the South Caucasus. Excavations surrounding Neolithic settlements there unearthed grape pips of a variety which differed from those of wild grapes, pointing to deliberate cultivation, and local pottery dated to approximately 6000 BCE was decorated with depictions of celebrating human figures.

The earliest clear chemical evidence of beer produced from barley dates to about 3500–3100 BCE, from the site of Godin Tepe in the Zagros Mountains of western Iran. At a site dating to 3100-2900 BCE, a pottery vessel containing residue of alcoholic barley was discovered, possibly serving as the earliest proof of beer brewing in the region. However, it is unclear whether it was meant for intoxication or nourishment.

Celtic people were known to have been making types of alcoholic cider as early as 3000 BCE. and wine was consumed in Classical Greece at breakfast or at symposia, and in the 1st century BCE.

Archaeological finds as well as ancient documentation serve as testimony to the popularity and abundance of alcohol in the Sumerian society. Access to alcohol was regulated, the social elite indulged in it and it served as sacrificial offerings to the gods. In Sumerian culture Alcohol was also a means for happiness. In the epic of Gilgamesh, Enkidu the wild man drinks seven jugs of beer, becomes elated and sings with joy. Other characters routinely drink water, but drink alcohol when celebrating. During the new year celebrations, the ceremonial reenactment of the drunken union between the king of Uruk and the high priestess of Ishtar, the goddess of procreation, symbolized the genesis of Ninkasi, the beer goddess. A hymn to Ninkasi gives a detailed description of hash production in Sumer, involving the fermentation of bread and the addition of grapes and honey, resulting in an unfiltered brew drunk through straws.

In Hierakonpolis, Egypt, the remains of a brewery dating to circa 3400 BCE was unearthed, with an estimated yield of up to 1135 litres (300 US gallons) of brew per day. Wine was a symbol of power and was imported from abroad, hence it was reserved for royalty and the social elite, while beer was the drink of common society. In the tomb of the Scorpion king, who ruled Hierakonpolis when the brewery was built, approximately 700 wine jars imported from the southern Levant were unearthed. Financial documents recorded that the daily ration of beer for the workers who built the pyramids of Giza was nearly 4 litres, and modern reproductions of the ancient recipe produced a brew weighed in at 5 percent ABV, the same as that of the modern day pint. Despite the many Egyptian sources describing brewing methods, very few discuss intoxication. However, an annual celebration of the "Drunkenness of Hathor" commemorated the intoxication of the goddess Sekhmet/Hathor with beer disguised as blood by other gods, causing her to fall into a drunken stupor and allowing them to take control over creation, an act which prevented her from exterminating humanity. In honor of this deed a red coloured alcohol was drunk in large quantities during the festival causing similar intoxicated stupors. Osiris was also associated with wine, as his death and resurrection were compared to the cycle of withering and regrowth of the vine during the winter and spring. The Oag festival, dedicated to Osiris, was marked by the drinking of wine, and during the late dynastic period the devotees of Osiris would offer prayers and conduct rituals, after which they would drink wine and consume bread, believing that they had been transubstantiated in to the flesh and blood of Osiris. Multiple amphorae were discovered in the graves of pharaohs and elites as provisions for the afterlife and as offerings to Osiris, commonly with labels detailing their origin, maker, and date. Over time, labels eventually included assessments of quality as well, such as "good," (nfr) "very good," (nfr nfr) or "very very good," (nfr nfr nfr) alongside provenance, and it was believed that certain vintages improved with age. Archaeological findings reveal that some wines buried with their owners were several decades old, exceeding the average life expectancy, and therefore assumed to have outlived their creators.

=== Medieval period ===
==== Medieval Middle East ====
Medieval Muslim chemists such as Jābir ibn Ḥayyān (Latin: Geber, ninth century) and Abū Bakr al-Rāzī (Latin: Rhazes, c. 865–925) experimented extensively with the distillation of various substances. The distillation of wine is attested in Arabic works attributed to al-Kindī (c. 801–873 CE) and to al-Fārābī (c. 872–950), and in the 28th book of al-Zahrāwī's (Latin: Abulcasis, 936–1013) Kitāb al-Taṣrīf (later translated into Latin as Liber servatoris). 12th century: The process of distillation spread from the Middle East to Italy, where distilled alcoholic drinks were recorded in the mid-12th century.

==== Medieval Europe ====
In Italy, the works of Taddeo Alderotti (1223–1296) describe a method for concentrating alcohol involving repeated fractional distillation through a water-cooled still. By the early 14th century, distilled alcoholic drinks had spread throughout the European continent. Distillation spread to Ireland and Scotland no later than the 15th century, as did the common European practice of distilling "aqua vitae", primarily for medicinal purposes.

=== Early modern period ===
in 1690, England passed "An Act for the Encouraging of the Distillation of Brandy and Spirits from Corn" Alcoholic beverages played an important role in the Thirteen Colonies from their early days when drinking wine and beer at that time was safer than drinking water – which was usually taken from sources also used to dispose of sewage and garbage. Drinking hard liquor was common occurrence in early nineteenth-century United States.

The Whiskey Rebellion (also known as the Whiskey Insurrection) was a violent tax protest in the United States beginning in 1791 and ending in 1794 during the presidency of George Washington. The so-called "whiskey tax" was the first tax imposed on a domestic product by the newly formed federal government. Beer was difficult to transport and spoiled more easily than rum and whiskey.

=== Modern period ===
The Rum Rebellion of 1808 was a coup d'état in the then-British penal colony of New South Wales, staged by the New South Wales Corps in order to depose Governor William Bligh. Australia's first and only military coup, its name derives from the illicit rum trade of early Sydney, over which the 'Rum Corps', as it became known, maintained a monopoly. During the first half of the 19th century, it was widely referred to in Australia as the Great Rebellion. The alcohol monopoly system has a long history in various countries, often implemented to limit the availability and consumption of alcohol for public health and social welfare reasons.

The alcohol monopoly was created in the Swedish town of Falun in 1850, to prevent overconsumption and reduce the profit motive for sales of alcohol. It later went all over the country in 1905 when the Swedish parliament ordered all sales of vodka to be done via local alcohol monopolies. In 1894, the Russian Empire established a state monopoly on vodka, which became a major source of revenue for the Russian government.

Later in the nineteenth century opposition to alcohol grew in the form of the temperance movement, in the United States, United Kingdom, Canada, Scandinavia and India, and it eventually led to national prohibitions in Canada (1918 to 1920), Norway (spirits only from 1919 to 1926), Finland (1919 to 1932), and the United States (1920 to 1933), as well as provincial prohibition in India (1948 to present).

== Fermented drinks ==
=== Beer ===
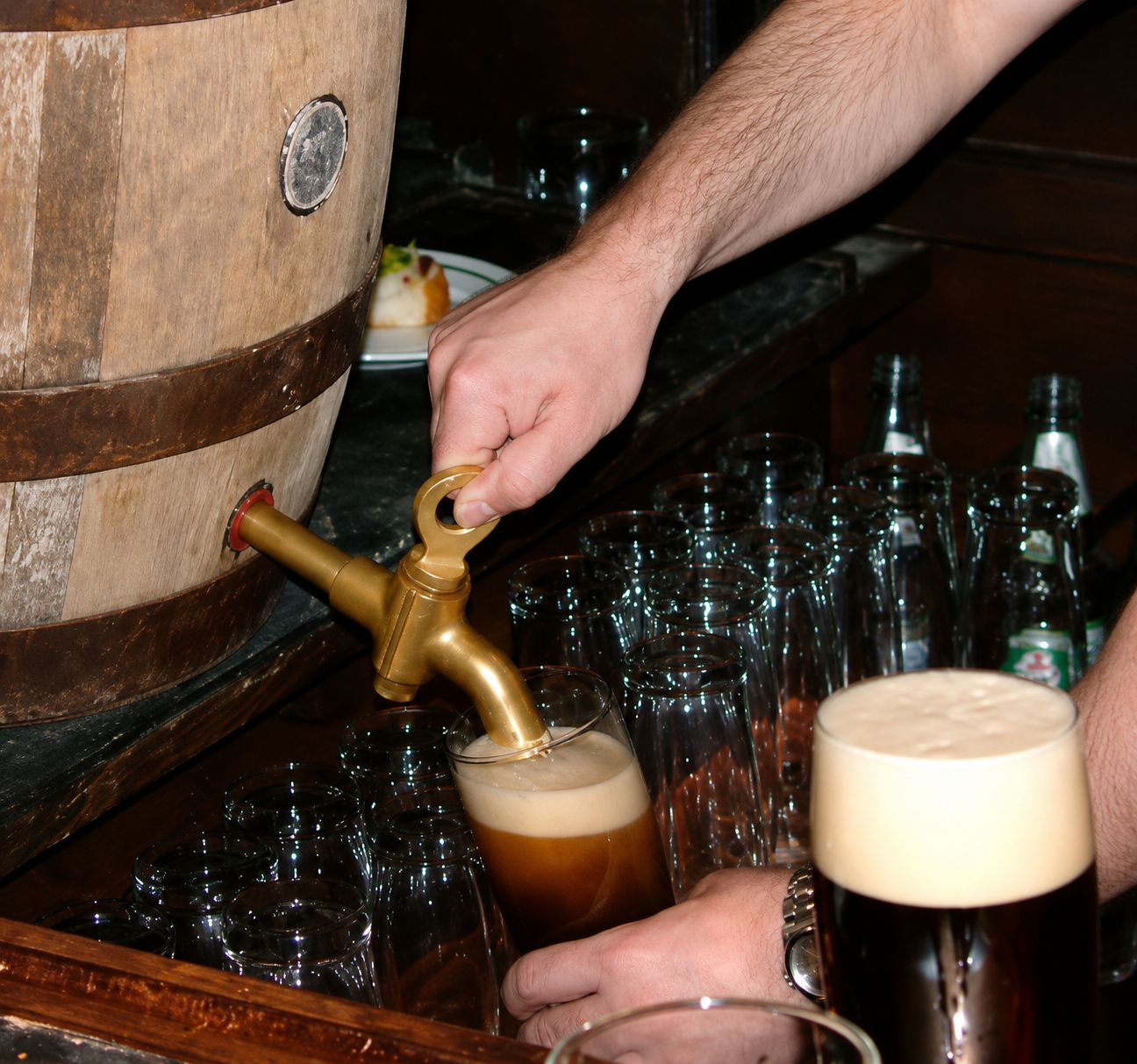
Schlenkerla Rauchbier, a traditional smoked beer, being poured from a cask into a beer glass

Beer is a beverage fermented from grain mash. It is typically made from barley or a blend of several grains and flavored with hops. Most beer is naturally carbonated as part of the fermentation process. If the fermented mash is distilled, then the drink becomes a spirit. Beer is the most consumed alcoholic beverage in the world.

=== Cider ===
Cider or cyder (/ˈsaɪdər/ SY-dər) is a fermented alcoholic drink made from any fruit juice; apple juice (traditional and most common), peaches, pears ("Perry" cider) or other fruit. Cider alcohol content varies from 1.2% ABV to 8.5% or more in traditional English ciders. In some regions, cider may be called "apple wine".

=== Fermented water ===
Fermented water is an ethanol-based water solution with approximately 15-17% ABV without sweet reserve. Fermented water is exclusively fermented with white sugar, yeast, and water. Fermented water is clarified after the fermentation to produce a colorless or off-white liquid with no discernible taste other than that of ethanol.

=== Mead ===
Mead (/miːd/), also called hydromel, is an alcoholic drink made by fermenting honey with water, sometimes with various fruits, spices, grains, or hops. The alcoholic content of mead may range from as low as 3% ABV to more than 20%. The defining characteristic of mead is that the majority of the drink's fermentable sugar is derived from honey. Mead can also be referred to as "honeywine."

=== Pulque ===
Pulque is the Mesoamerican fermented drink made from the "honey water" of maguey, Agave americana. Pulque can be distilled to produce tequila or Mezcal.

=== Rice wine ===
Rice wine is an alcoholic drink fermented and possibly distilled from rice, consumed in East Asia, Southeast Asia and South Asia. Sake, huangjiu, mijiu, and cheongju are popular examples of East Asian rice wine.

=== Wine ===
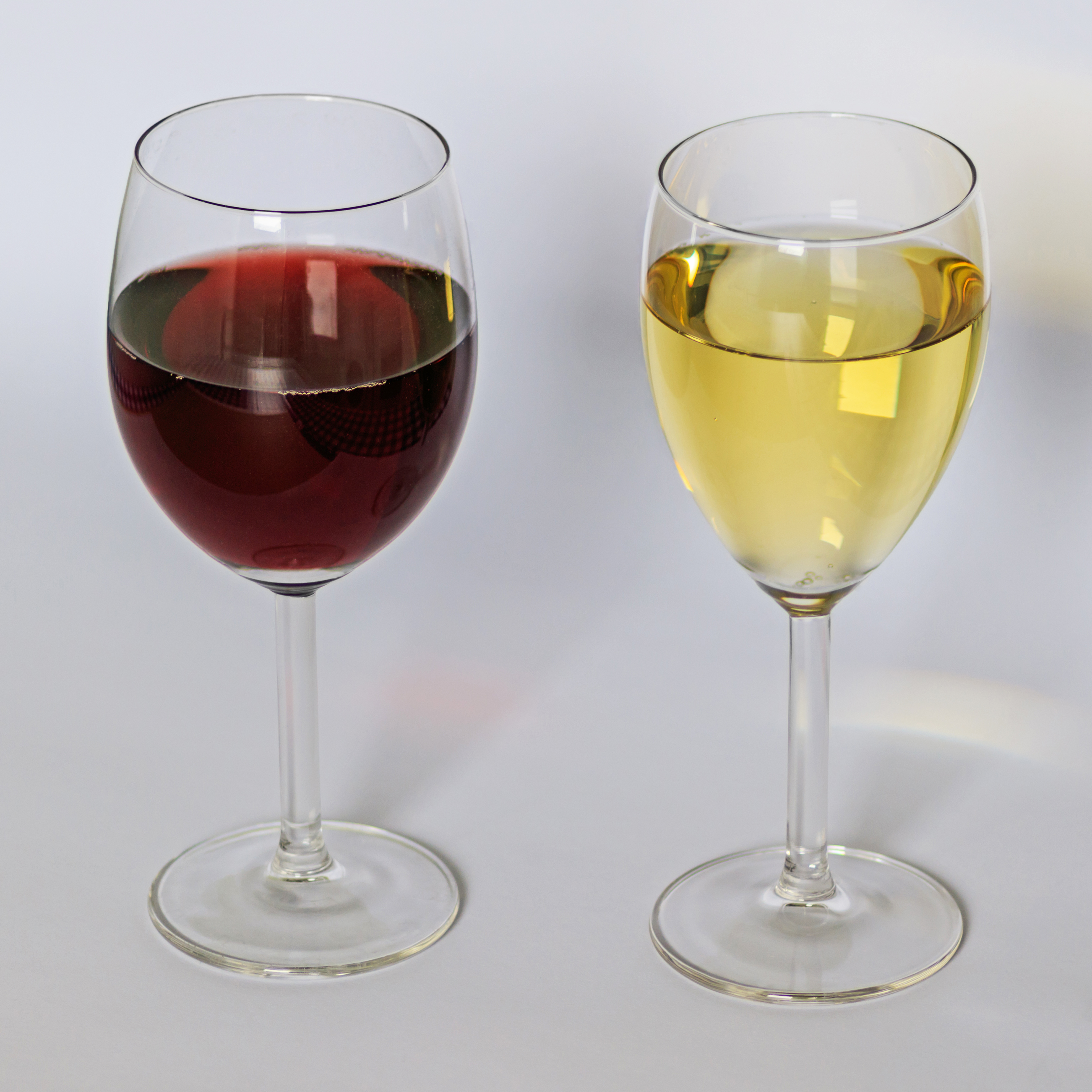
Glasses of red and white wine

Wine is a fermented beverage most commonly produced from grapes. Wine involves a longer fermentation process than beer and often a long aging process (months or years), resulting in an alcohol content of 9%–16% ABV.

Sparkling wines such as French Champagne, Catalan Cava and Italian Prosecco are also made from grapes, with a secondary fermentation.

Fruit wines are made from fruits other than grapes, such as plums, cherries, or apples.

== Fermentation process ==
Wine, beer, and spirits are produced through the activity of yeasts, a group of roughly 160 species of single-celled fungi, some of which are beneficial, while others are associated with food spoilage or human disease. The most commonly used yeasts in fermentation and baking belong to the genus Saccharomyces, whose name means "sugar fungus". These organisms are cultivated both for their role in generating flavors and aromas considered desirable, and for their ability to inhibit the growth of competing microbes which would otherwise infect food. Their production of alcohol is linked to their capacity to function with minimal oxygen. In the presence of oxygen, other living cells metabolise fuel molecules leaving behind only carbon dioxide and water, when oxygen is absent sugars can only partially be broken down, following the general equation (from glucose to energy):

$\ce{C6H12O6 -> 2CH3CH2OH + 2CO2 + energy}$

$\ce{Glucose -> alcohol + carbon-dioxide + energy}$

== Distilled beverages ==
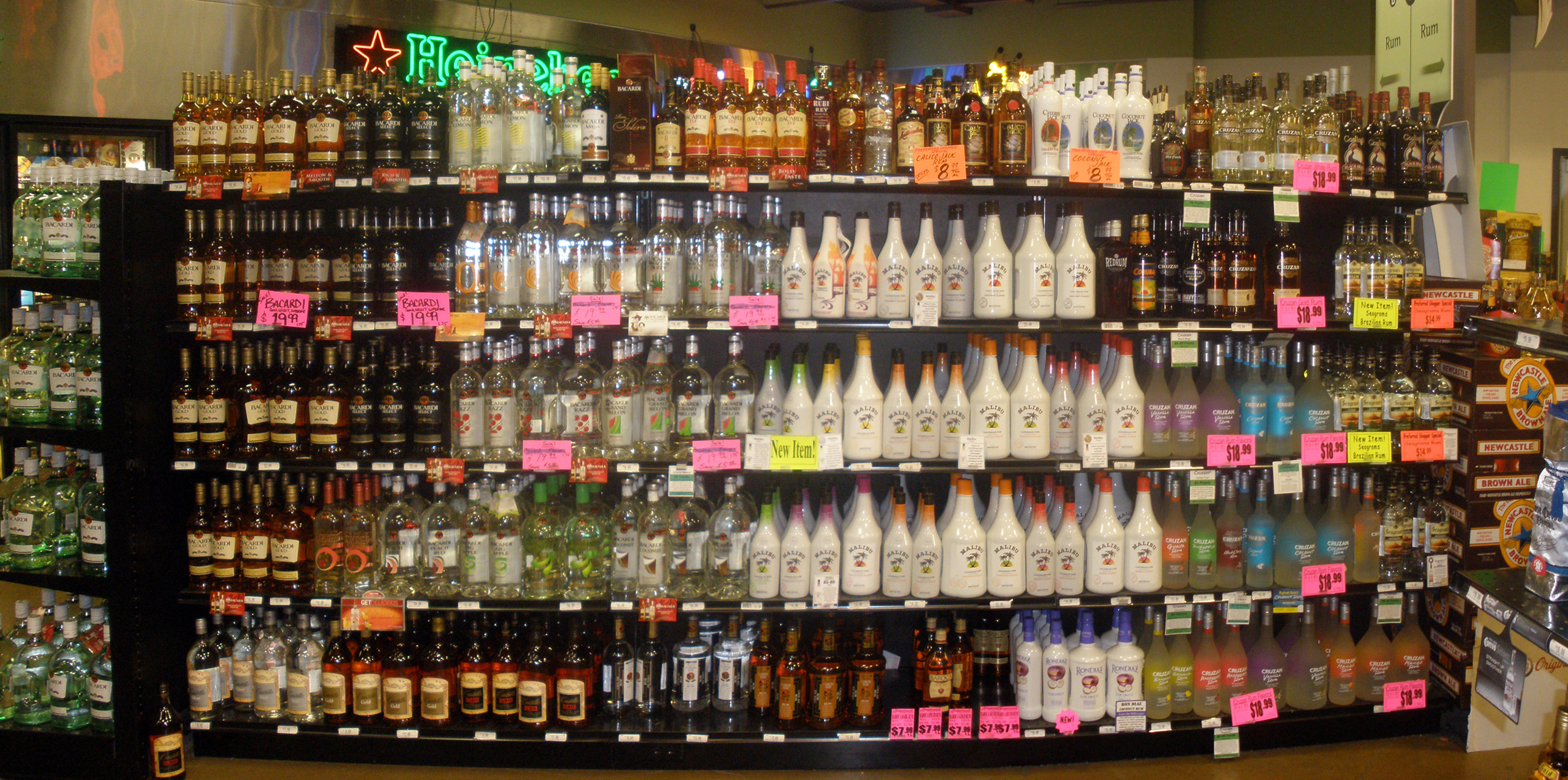
Rum display in liquor store

Distilled beverages (also called liquors or spirit drinks) are alcoholic drinks produced by distilling (i.e., concentrating by distillation) ethanol produced by means of fermenting grain, fruit, or vegetables. Unsweetened, distilled, alcoholic drinks that have an alcohol content of at least 20% ABV are called spirits. For the most common distilled drinks, such as whisky (or whiskey) and vodka, the alcohol content is around 40%. The term hard liquor is used in North America to distinguish distilled drinks from undistilled ones (implicitly weaker). Brandy, gin, mezcal, rum, tequila, vodka, whisky (or whiskey), baijiu, shōchū and soju are examples of distilled drinks. Distilling concentrates the alcohol and eliminates some of the congeners. Freeze distillation concentrates ethanol along with methanol and fusel alcohols (fermentation by-products partially removed by distillation) in applejack.

Fortified wine is wine, such as port or sherry, to which a distilled beverage (usually brandy) has been added. Fortified wine is distinguished from spirits made from wine in that spirits are produced by means of distillation, while fortified wine is wine that has had a spirit added to it. Many different styles of fortified wine have been developed, including port, sherry, madeira, marsala, commandaria, and the aromatized wine vermouth.

=== Rectified spirit ===
Rectified spirit, also called "neutral grain spirit", is alcohol which has been purified by means of "rectification" (i.e. repeated distillation). The term neutral refers to the spirit's lack of flavor that would have been present if the mash ingredients had been distilled to a lower level of alcoholic purity. Rectified spirit also lacks any flavoring added to it after distillation (as is done, for example, with gin). Other kinds of spirits, such as whiskey, (or whisky) are distilled to a lower alcohol percentage to preserve the flavor of the mash.

Rectified spirit is a clear, colorless, flammable liquid that may contain as much as 95% ABV. It is often used for medicinal purposes. It may be a grain spirit, or it may be made from other plants. It is used in mixed drinks, liqueurs, and tinctures, and also as a household solvent.

=== Congeners ===
In the alcoholic drinks industry, congeners are substances produced during fermentation. These substances include small amounts of chemicals such as occasionally desired alcohols, like propanol and 3-methyl-1-butanol, as well as compounds that are never desired such as acetone, acetaldehyde and glycols. Congeners are responsible for most of the taste and aroma of distilled alcoholic drinks and contribute to the taste of non-distilled drinks. It has been suggested that these substances contribute to the symptoms of a hangover. Tannins are congeners found in wine in the presence of phenolic compounds. Wine tannins add bitterness, have a drying sensation, taste herbaceous, and are often described as astringent. Wine tannins add balance, complexity, structure and make a wine last longer, so they play an important role in the aging of wine.

=== Top-shelf liquor ===
Top-shelf liquor (or "premium liquor") is a term used in marketing to describe higher-priced alcoholic beverages, typically stored on the top shelves within bars.

== Mixed drinks and others ==
A mixed drink is a beverage in which two or more ingredients are mixed, and is often alcoholic.

=== Alcopops ===
An alcopop (or cooler) is any of certain mixed alcoholic beverages with relatively low alcohol content (e.g., 3–7% alcohol by volume), including:

1. Malt beverages to which various fruit juices or other flavorings have been added
2. Wine coolers: beverages containing wine to which ingredients such as fruit juice or other flavorings have been added
3. Mixed drinks containing distilled alcohol and sweet liquids such as fruit juices or other flavourings

=== Alcohol powder ===
Alcohol powder or powdered alcohol or dry alcohol is a product generally made using micro-encapsulation. When reconstituted with water, the powder becomes an alcoholic drink.

=== Well drink ===
A well drink or rail drink is an alcoholic beverage or mixed drink made using the lower-cost liquors stored within easy reach of the bartender in the bar's "speed rail", "speed rack", or "well", a rack or shelf at a lower level than the bar that the bartender uses to prepare drinks.

== Amount of use ==
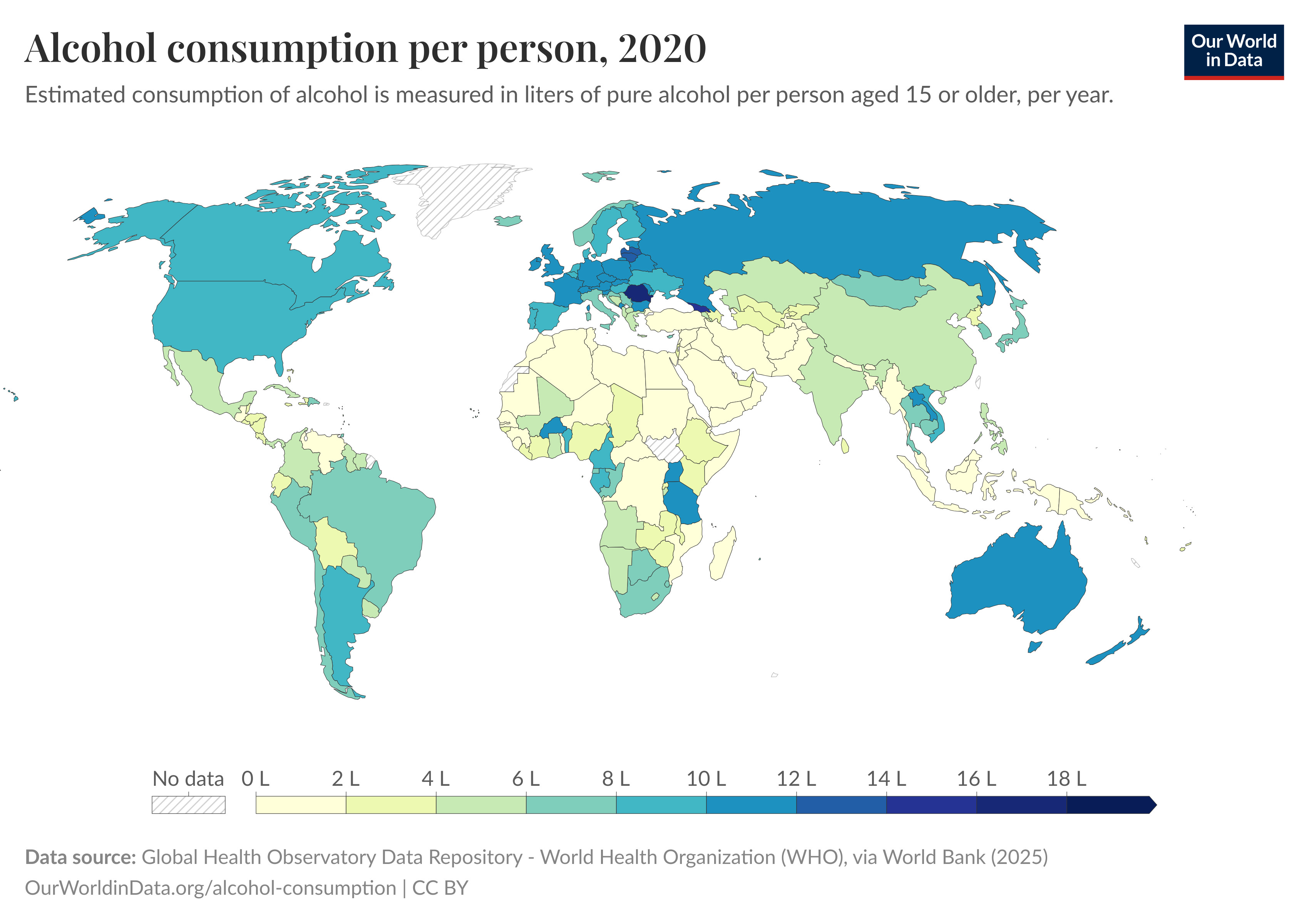
Alcohol consumption per person in 2020. Consumption of alcohol is measured in liters of pure alcohol per person aged 15 or older.

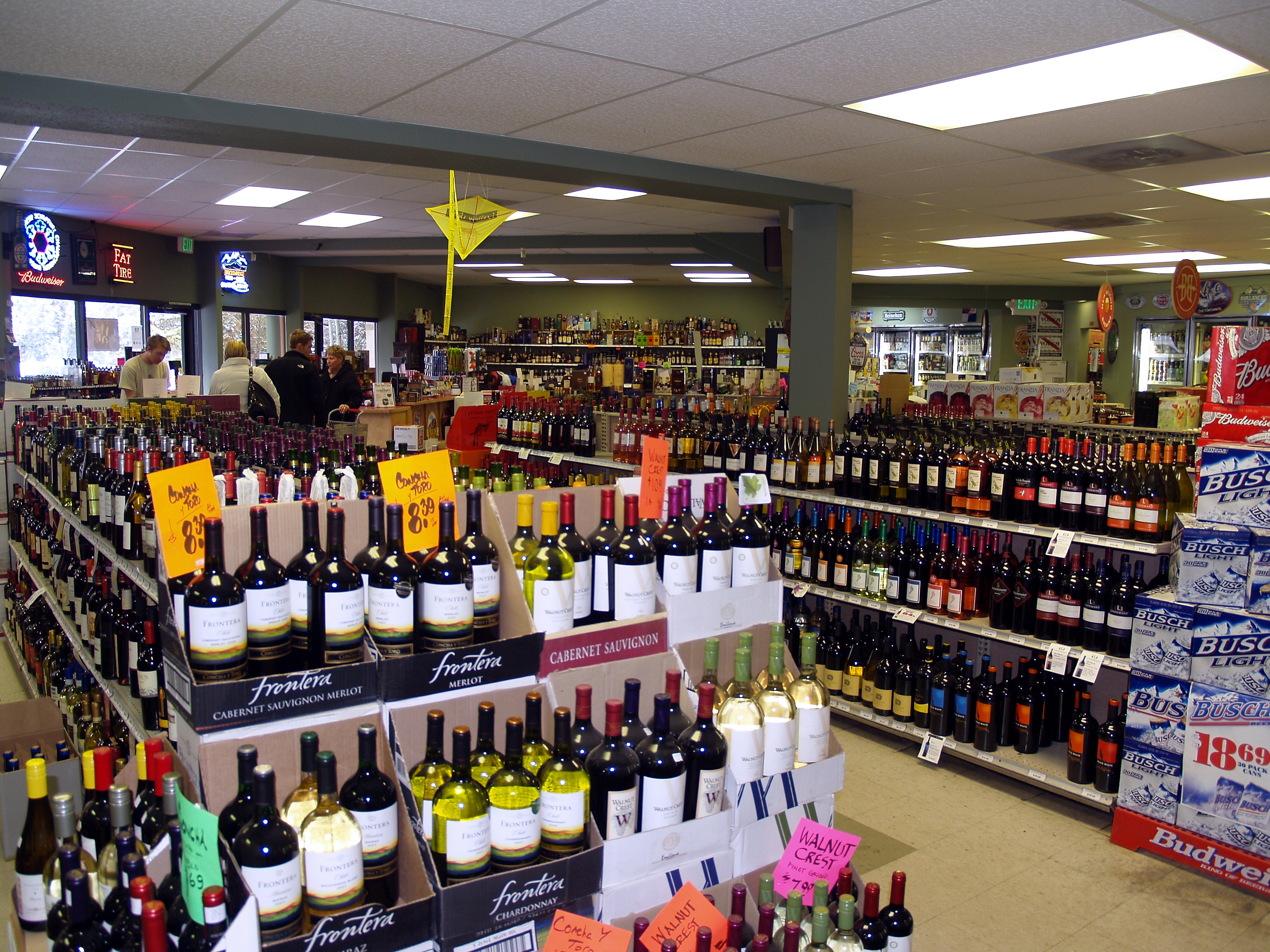
A liquor store in the United States. Global sales of alcoholic beverages exceeded $1.5 trillion in 2017.

The average number of people who drink as of 2016 was 39% for males and 25% for females (2.4 billion people in total). Females on average drink 0.7 drinks per day while males drink 1.7 drinks per day. The rates of drinking varies significantly in different areas of the world.

Age-standardised prevalence of current drinking for females (A) and males (B) in 2016, in 195 locations

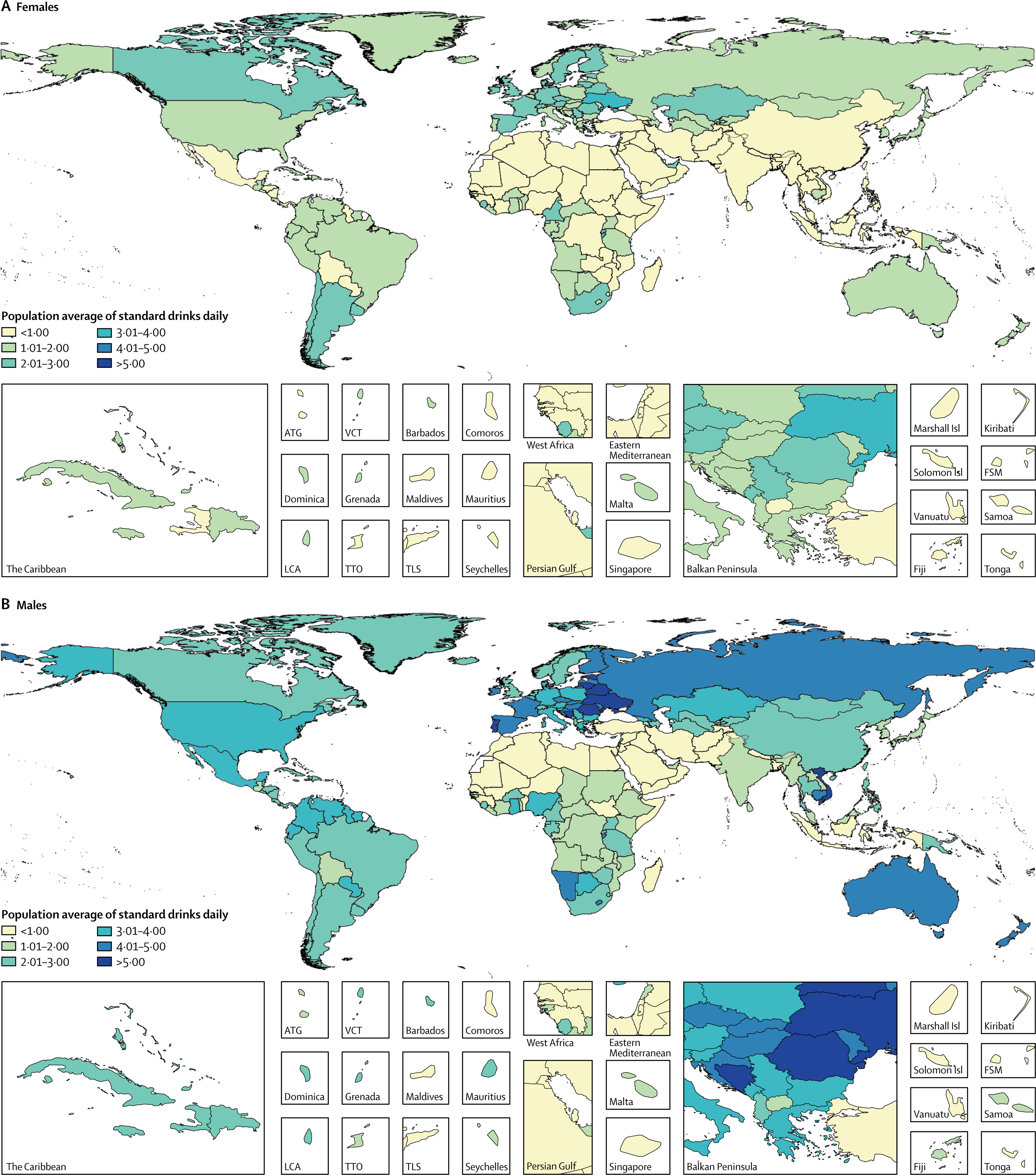
Average standard drinks (10 g of pure ethanol per serving) consumed per day, age-standardised, for females (A) and males (B) in 2016, in 195 locations

== Uses ==
=== Activities ===
==== Drinking games ====
Drinking games are games which involve the consumption of alcoholic beverages and often enduring the subsequent intoxication resulting from them. Evidence of the existence of drinking games dates back to antiquity. Drinking games have been banned at some institutions, particularly colleges and universities.

==== Drinking songs ====
A drinking song is a song sung while drinking an alcoholic beverage.

=== Experiences ===
==== Drinking establishments ====
===== Beer garden =====
A beer garden (German: Biergarten) is an outdoor area in which beer and food are served, typically at shared tables shaded by trees.

===== Beer hall =====
A beer hall (German: Bierpalast, Bierhalle) is a large pub that specializes in beer.

===== Cider house =====
A cider house is an establishment that sells alcoholic cider for consumption on the premises. Some cider houses also sell cider "to go", for consumption off the premises. A traditional cider house was often little more than a room in a farmhouse or cottage, selling locally fermented cider.

===== Ouzeri =====
An ouzeri (Greek ουζερί IPA: [uzeˈri]) is a type of Greek tavern which serves ouzo (a Greek liquor) and mezedes (small finger foods).

===== Pulquerías =====
Pulquerías (or pulcherías) are a type of tavern in Mexico that specialize in serving an alcoholic beverage known as pulque.

===== Tiki bar =====
A tiki bar is a themed drinking establishment that serves elaborate cocktails, especially rum-based mixed drinks such as the Mai Tai and Zombie cocktails. Tiki bars are aesthetically defined by their tiki culture décor which is based upon a romanticized conception of tropical cultures, most commonly Polynesian.

===== Toddy shop =====
A toddy shop is a drinking establishment seen in some parts of India (particularly Kerala) where palm toddy, a mildly alcoholic beverage made from the sap of palm trees, is served along with food.

===== Wine bar =====
A wine bar is a tavern-like business focusing on selling wine, rather than liquor or beer. A typical feature of many wine bars is a wide selection of wines available by the glass. Some wine bars are profiled on wines of a certain type of origin, such as Italian wine or Champagne. While many wine bars are private "stand-alone" establishments, in some cases, wine bars are associated with a specific wine retailer or other outlet of wine, to provide additional marketing for that retailer's wine portfolio. In countries where licensing regulations allow this, some wine bars also sell the wines they serve, and effectively function as a hybrid between a wine shop and a wine bar.

==== Festivals ====
===== Beer festivals =====
A beer festival is an event at which a variety of beers are available for purchase. There may be a theme, for instance beers from a particular area, or a particular brewing style such as winter ales.

===== Wine festivals =====
Annual wine festivals celebrate viticulture and usually occur after the harvest of the grapes which, in the northern hemisphere, generally falls at the end of September and runs until well into October or later. They are common in most wine regions around the world and are to be considered in the tradition of other harvest festivals.

==== Tasting ====
===== Beer tasting =====
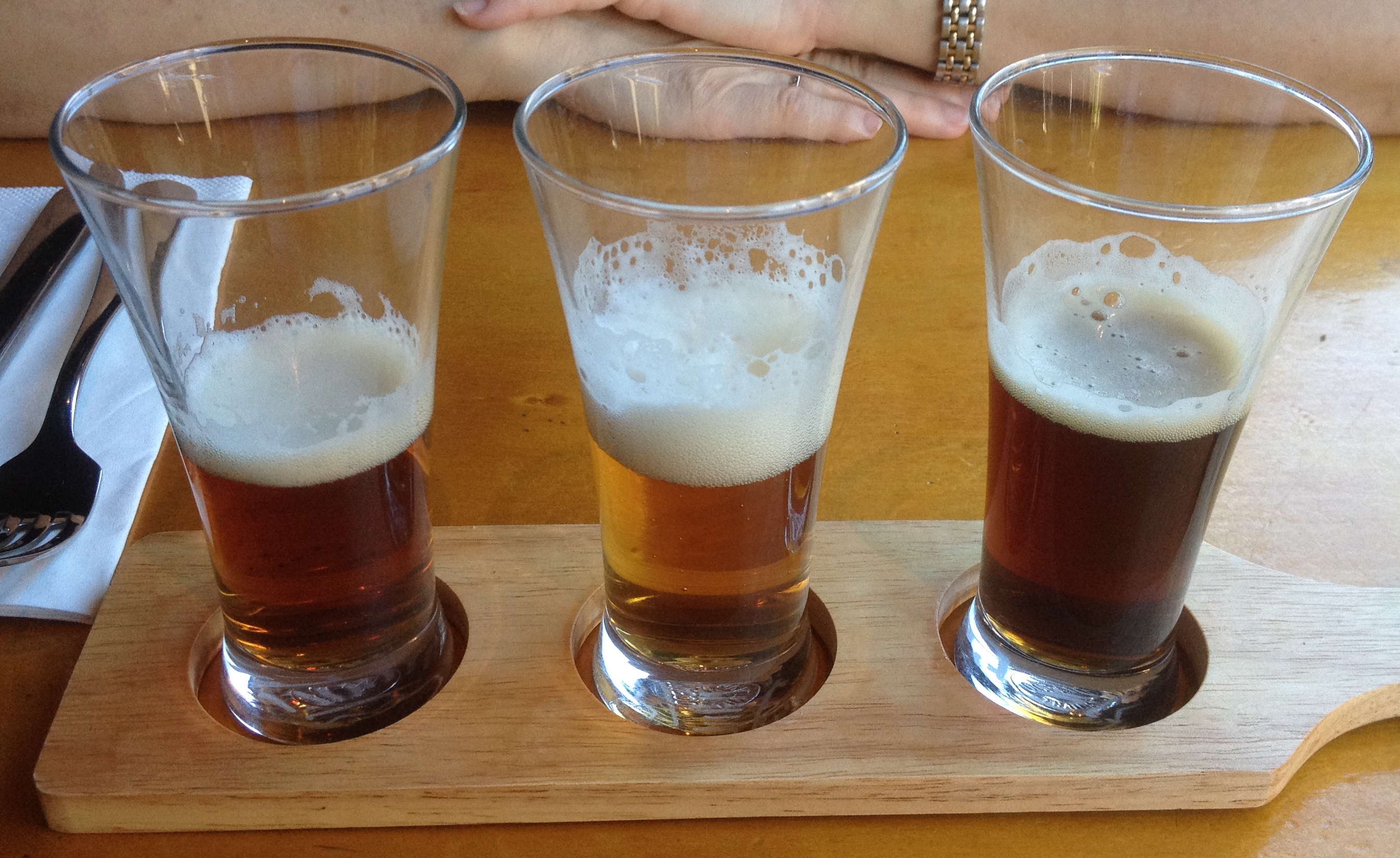
A beer flight of three beers, on a wooden beer paddle, served by a bar in Brisbane, Australia

Beer tasting is a way to learn more about the history, ingredients, and production of beer, as well as different beer styles, hops, yeast, and beer presentation. A common approach is to analyze the appearance, smell, and taste of the beer, and then make a final judgment on the beer's quality. There are various scales used by beer journalists and experts to rate beer, such as the 1-20 scale used by British sommelier Jancis Robinson and the 1-100 scale used by American sommelier Joshua M. Bernstein. Professional organizations like the Wine & Spirit Education Trust often rate beer using verbal grades ranging from "faulty" to "outstanding" on a 1-5 scale.

===== Wine tasting =====
Wine tasting, on the other hand, is the sensory examination and evaluation of wine. While the practice of wine tasting is ancient, a more formalized methodology has been established since the 14th century. Modern, professional wine tasters use specialized terminology to describe the range of perceived flavors, aromas, and general characteristics of a wine. More informal, recreational tasting may involve similar terminology, but with a less analytical process and a more general, personal appreciation of the wine.

==== Tourism ====
===== Beer tourism =====
Craft beer tourism refers to tourism where the primary motivation of travel is to visit a brewery, beer festival, beer related activity or other event that allows attendees to experience all aspects of the craft beer-making, consuming and purchasing process.

===== Wine tourism =====
Enotourism, oenotourism, wine tourism, or vinitourism refers to tourism whose purpose is or includes the tasting, consumption or purchase of wine, often at or near the source. Where other types of tourism are often passive in nature, enotourism can consist of visits to wineries, tasting wines, vineyard walks, or even taking an active part in the harvest.

=== Food ===
==== Apéritifs and digestifs ====
An apéritif is any alcoholic beverage usually served before a meal to stimulate the appetite, while a digestif is any alcoholic beverage served after a meal for the stated purpose of improving digestion. Fortified wine, liqueurs, and dry champagne are common apéritifs. Because apéritifs are served before dining, they are usually dry rather than sweet. One example is Cinzano, a brand of vermouth. Digestifs include brandy, fortified wines and herb-infused spirits (Drambuie).

==== Cooking ====
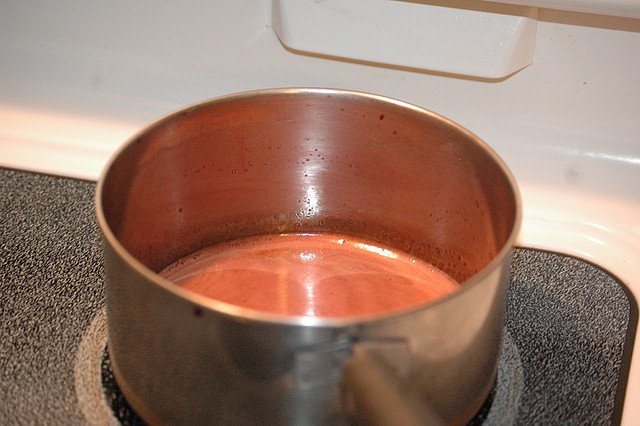
Reduction of red wine for a sauce by cooking it on a stovetop. It is called a reduction because the heat boils off some of the water and most of the more volatile alcohol, leaving a more concentrated, wine-flavoured sauce.

Pure ethanol tastes bitter to humans; some people also describe it as sweet. However, ethanol is also a moderately effective solvent for many fatty substances and essential oils. This facilitates the use of flavoring and coloring compounds in alcoholic drinks as a taste mask, especially in distilled drinks. Some flavors may be naturally present in the beverage's raw material. Beer and wine may also be flavored before fermentation, and spirits may be flavored before, during, or after distillation. Sometimes flavor is obtained by allowing the beverage to stand for months or years in oak barrels, usually made of American or French oak. A few brands of spirits may also have fruit or herbs inserted into the bottle at the time of bottling.

Wine is important in cuisine not just for its value as an accompanying beverage, but as a flavor agent, primarily in stocks and braising, since its acidity lends balance to rich savory or sweet dishes. Wine sauce is an example of a culinary sauce that uses wine as a primary ingredient. Natural wines may exhibit a broad range of alcohol content, from below 9% to above 16% ABV, with most wines being in the 12.5–14.5% range. Fortified wines (usually with brandy) may contain 20% alcohol or more.

==== Food preservative ====
Alcohol has been used to preserve food.

==== Drinking food ====
Terms for foods always served with alcoholic beverages:

- Anju—Korean term for drinking food
- Kap klaem—Thai term for drinking food
- Sakana—Japanese term for snacks served while drinking

==== Vinegar production ====
Vinegar (vyn egre; sour wine) is an aqueous solution of acetic acid and trace compounds that may include flavorings. Vinegar typically contains from 5% to 18% acetic acid by volume. Usually, the acetic acid is produced by a double fermentation, converting simple sugars to ethanol using yeast and ethanol to acetic acid using acetic acid bacteria.

The source materials for making vinegar are varied – different fruits, grains, alcoholic beverages, and other fermentable materials are used:

- Apple cider vinegar, or cider vinegar, is a vinegar made from cider.
- Rice vinegar is a vinegar made from rice wine.

==== Wine and food matching ====
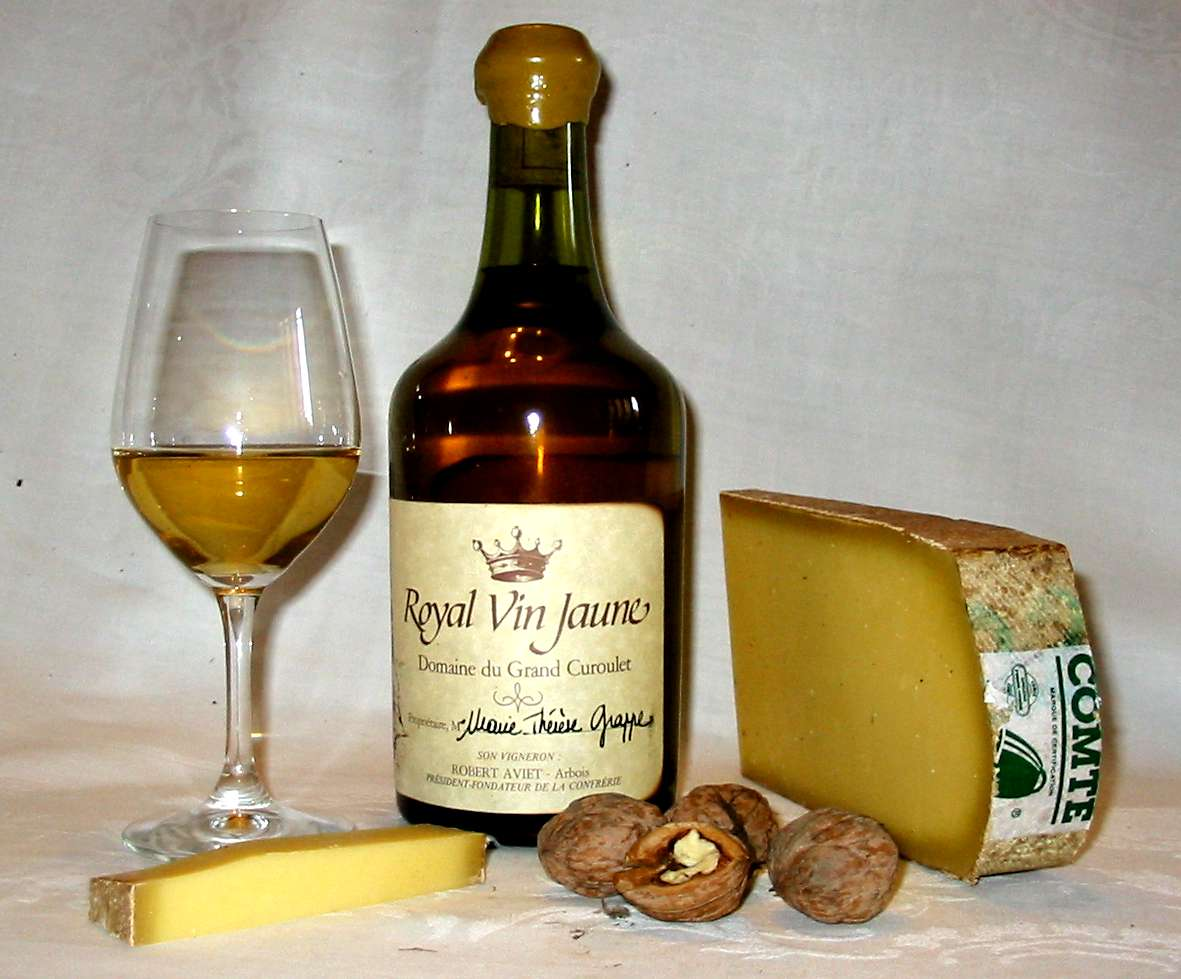
A pairing of vin jaune with walnuts and Comté cheese

Wine and food matching is the process of pairing food dishes with wine to enhance the dining experience. In many cultures, wine has had a long history of being a staple at the dinner table and in some ways both the winemaking and culinary traditions of a region will have evolved together over the years. Rather than following a set of rules, local cuisines were paired simply with local wines. The modern "art" of food pairings is a relatively recent phenomenon, fostering an industry of books and media with guidelines for pairings of particular foods and wine. In the restaurant industry, sommeliers are often present to make food pairing recommendations for the guest. The main concept behind pairings is that certain elements (such as texture and flavor) in both food and wine interact with each other, and thus finding the right combination of these elements will make the entire dining experience more enjoyable. However, taste and enjoyment are very subjective and what may be a "textbook perfect" pairing for one taster could be less enjoyable to another.

=== Offerings ===
==== Folk saints ====
Alcoholic beverages are typical offerings for the folk saint Maximón, and Santa Muerte. Both folk saints have been described as narco-saints.

==== Religious ====
===== Libation =====
A libation is a ritual pouring of a liquid, or grains such as rice, as an offering to a deity or spirit, or in memory of the dead. It was common in many religions of antiquity and continues to be offered in cultures today. Wine or other alcoholic drinks are often used for libation.

====== Africa ======
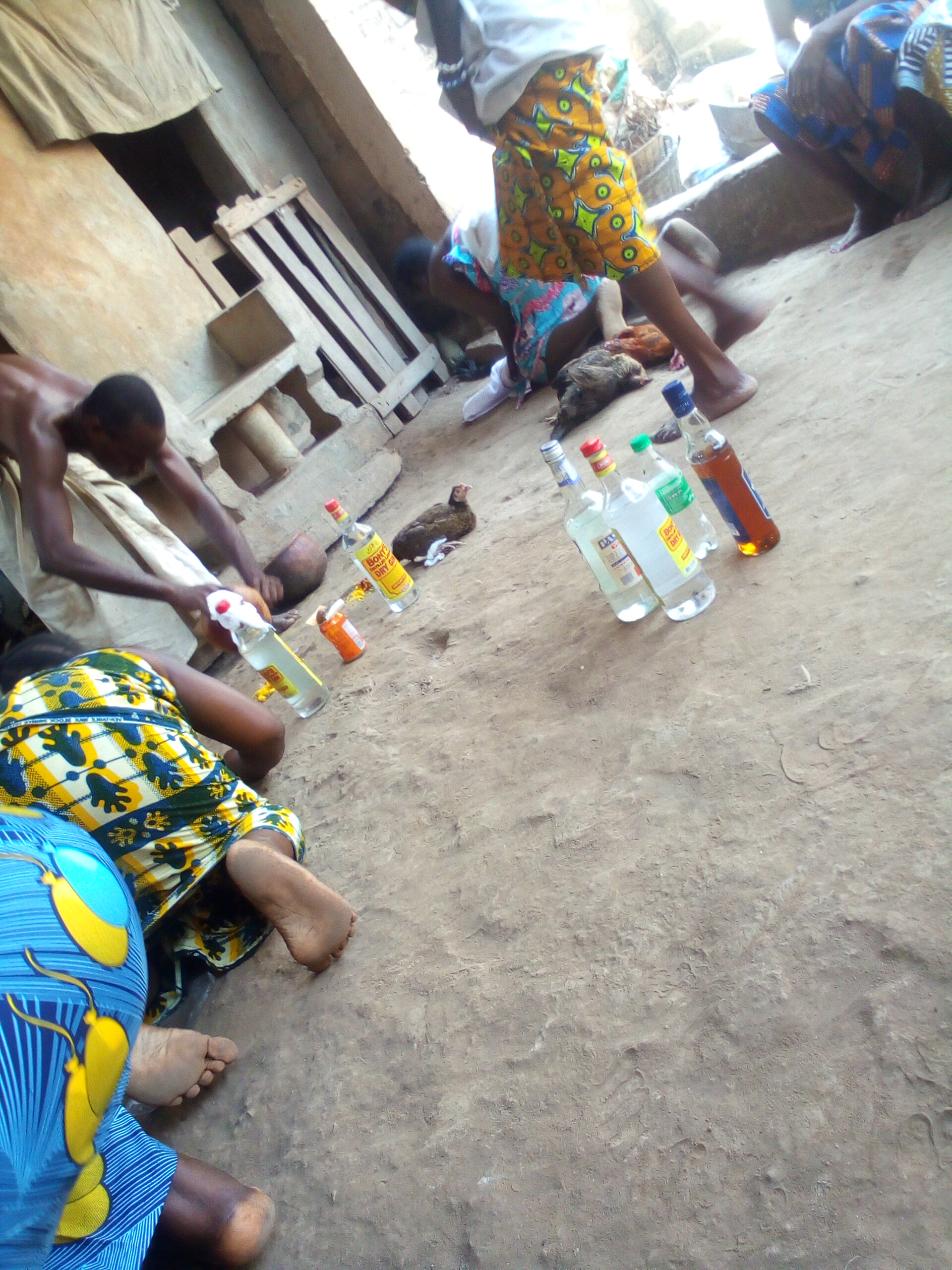
Prayers and libations made with gin, in a community in southern Benin

Libation was part of ancient Egyptian society where it was a drink offering to honor and please the various divinities, sacred ancestors, humans present and humans who are alive but not physically present, as well as the environment. It is suggested that libation originated somewhere in the upper Nile Valley and spread out to other regions of Africa and the world. According to Ayi Kwei Armah, "[t]his legend explains the rise of a propitiatory custom found everywhere on the African continent: libation, the pouring of alcohol or other drinks as offerings to ancestors and divinities."

====== Americas ======
In the Quechua and Aymara cultures of the South American Andes, it is common to pour a small amount of one's beverage on the ground before drinking as an offering to the Pachamama, or Mother Earth. This especially holds true when drinking Chicha, an alcoholic beverage unique to this part of the world. The libation ritual is commonly called challa and is performed quite often, usually before meals and during celebrations. The sixteenth century writer Bernardino de Sahagún records the Aztec ceremony associated with drinking octli:

Libation was done in this manner: when octli was drunk, when they tasted the new octli, when someone had just made octli...he summoned people. He set it out in a vessel before the hearth, along with small cups for drinking. Before having anyone drink, he took up octli with a cup and then poured it before the hearth; he poured the octli in the four directions. And when he had poured the octli then everyone drank it.

===== Sacramental wine in Christianity =====
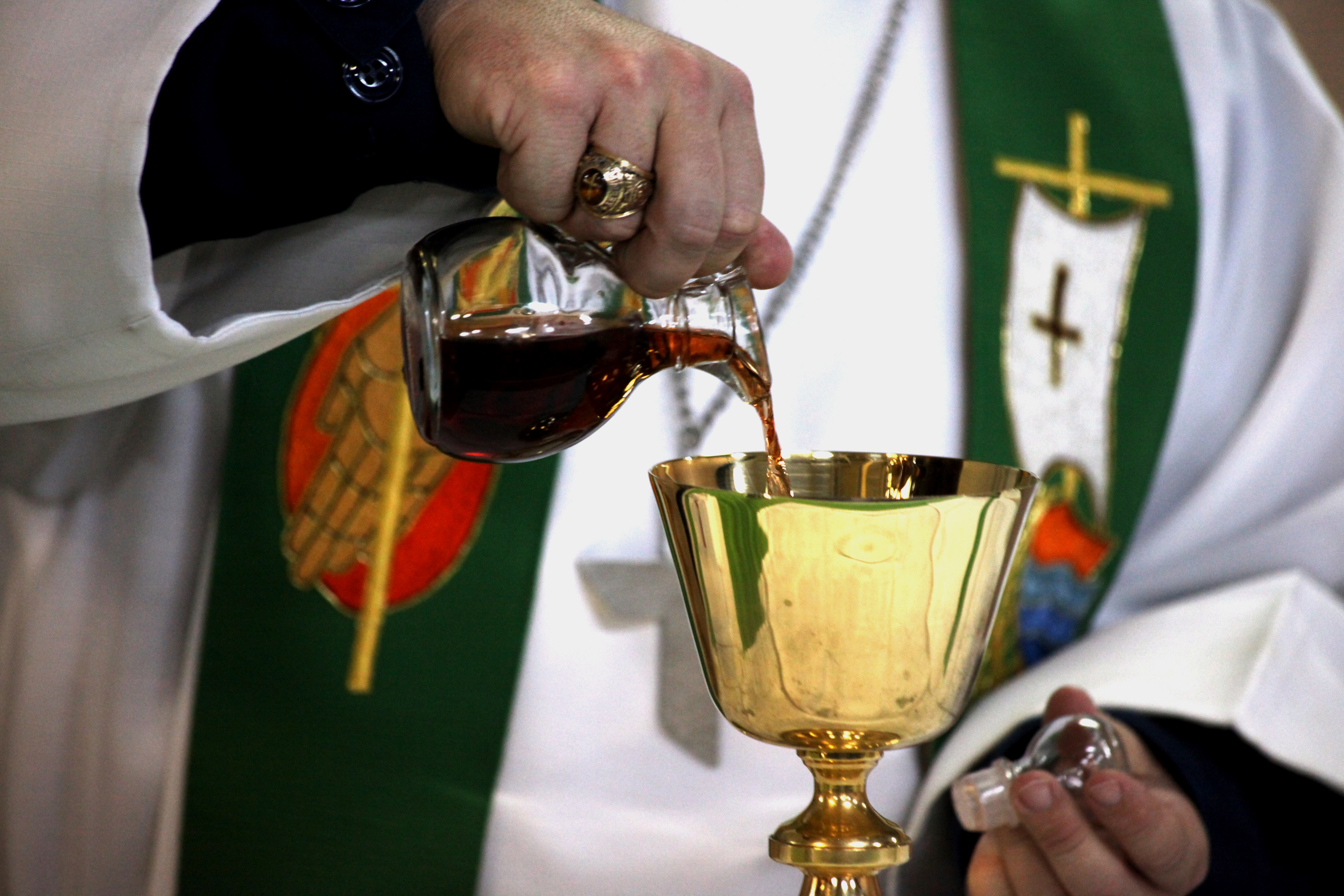
A chaplain pouring sacramental wine from a cruet into a chalice

The amount of sacramental wine consumed during the Eucharist is typically limited to a single sip or small portion, which does not result in a measurable increase in the participant's blood alcohol content. This controlled and symbolic consumption of the sacramental wine is an integral part of the Eucharistic rite and does not lead to intoxication.

====== Catholic Church ======
According to the Catholic Church, the sacramental wine used in the Eucharist must contain alcohol. Canon 924 of the present Code of Canon Law (1983) states:

§3 The wine must be natural, made from grapes of the vine, and not corrupt.

====== Lutheranism ======
In Lutheranism, the Catechism teaches:

289. What are the visible elements in the Sacrament?

The visible elements are bread and wine.

935. Matt. 26:26-27 Jesus took bread … Then He took the cup.

Note: “The fruit of the vine” (Luke 22:18) in the Bible means wine, not grape juice. See also 1 Cor. 11:21.

Some Evangelical Lutheran Church in America (ELCA) congregations make grape juice available for children and those who are abstaining from alcohol and some will accommodate those with an allergy to wheat, gluten, or grapes.

=== Tincture ===
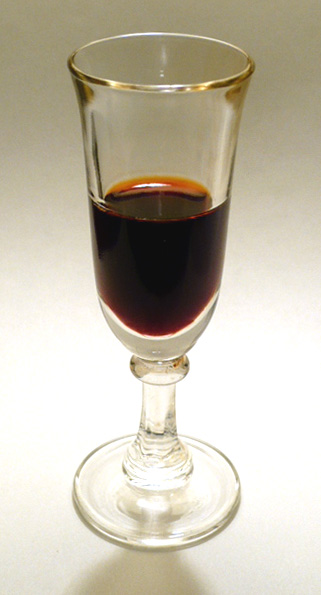
A tincture prepared from white willow bark and ethanol, containing salicin (from which salicylic acid-based products like aspirin are derived)

A tincture is typically an extract of plant or animal material dissolved in ethanol (ethyl alcohol). Solvent concentrations of 25–60% are common, but may run as high as 90%. In chemistry, a tincture is a solution that has ethanol as its solvent. In herbal medicine, alcoholic tinctures are made with various ethanol concentrations, which should be at least 20% alcohol for preservation purposes.

=== Other ===
A flaming drink is often ignited for aesthetic and entertainment purposes.

Alcoholic beverage may be consumed to celebrate observances such as the International Beer Day, International whisk(e)y day, or National Vodka Day. They also drink them for social events like International Women's Collaboration Brew Day, where people come together to make beer.

== Alcohol measurement ==
Alcohol measurements are units of measurement for determining amounts of beverage alcohol. Alcohol concentration in beverages is commonly expressed as alcohol by volume (ABV), ranging from less than 0.1% in fruit juices to up to 98% in rare cases of spirits. A standard drink is used globally to quantify alcohol intake, though its definition varies widely by country. Serving sizes of alcoholic beverages also vary by country.

== Beverage-specific equipment ==
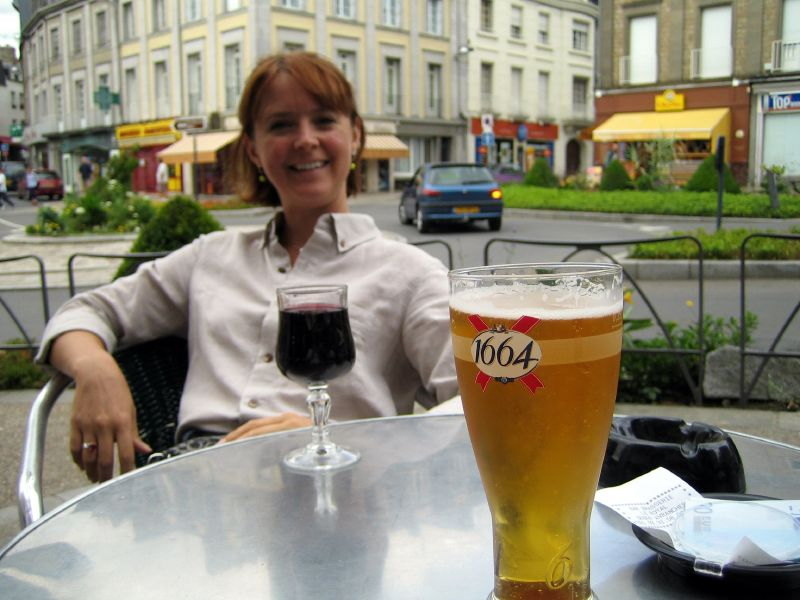
Wine (left) and beer (right) are served in different glasses.

- Absinthiana
- Beer bong
- Beer engine
- Beer tap
- Beer tower
- Hogshead
- Margarita machine
- Port tongs
- Wine dispenser
- Vending Machine

== Professions ==
- Cocktail waitress
- Beer sommelier
- Beer wench
- Wine sommelier
- Winemaker

== Laws ==
Alcohol laws regulate the manufacture, packaging, labelling, distribution, sale, consumption, blood alcohol content of motor vehicle drivers, open containers, and transportation of alcoholic drinks. Such laws generally seek to reduce the adverse health and social impacts of alcohol consumption. In particular, alcohol laws set the legal drinking age, which usually varies between 15 and 21 years old, sometimes depending upon the type of alcoholic drink (e.g., beer vs wine vs hard liquor or distillates). Some countries do not have a legal drinking or purchasing age, but most countries set the minimum age at 18 years.

Some countries, such as the U.S., have the drinking age higher than the legal age of majority (18), at age 21 in all 50 states. Such laws may take the form of permitting distribution only to licensed stores, monopoly stores, or pubs and they are often combined with taxation, which serves to reduce the demand for alcohol (by raising its price) and it is a form of revenue for governments. These laws also often limit the hours or days (e.g., "blue laws") on which alcohol may be sold or served, as can also be seen in the "last call" ritual in US and Canadian bars, where bartenders and servers ask patrons to place their last orders for alcohol, due to serving hour cutoff laws. In some countries, alcohol cannot be sold to a person who is already intoxicated. Alcohol laws in many countries prohibit drunk driving.

In some jurisdictions, alcoholic drinks are totally prohibited for reasons of religion (e.g., Islamic countries with sharia law) or for reasons of local option, public health, and morals (e.g., Prohibition in the United States from 1920 to 1933). In jurisdictions which enforce sharia law, the consumption of alcoholic drinks is an illegal offense, although such laws may exempt non-Muslims.

=== Alcohol-related crimes ===
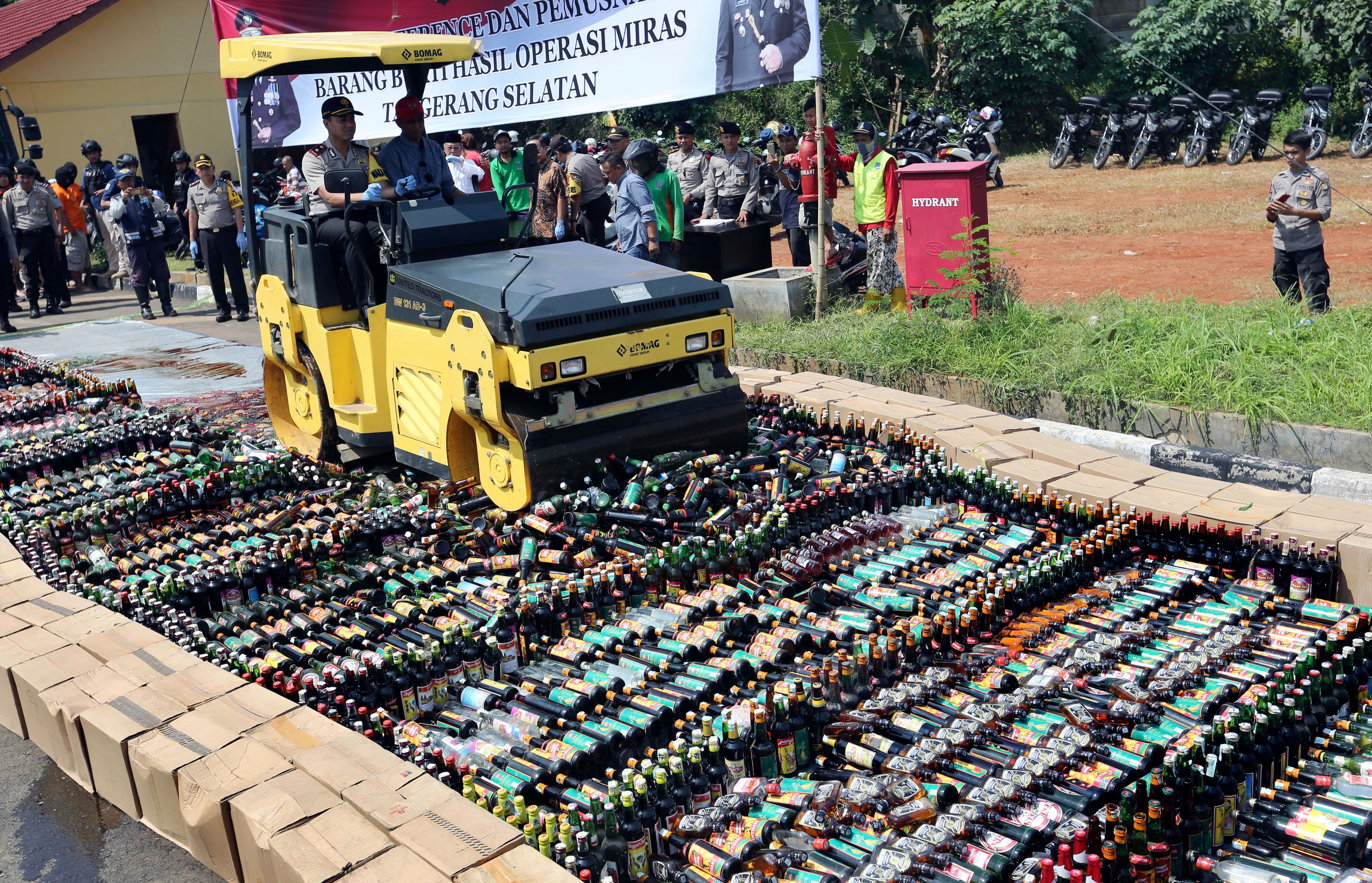
Police use a road roller to destroy bottles of illegal alcohol confiscated in Serpong, out of Jakarta, Indonesia, April 13, 2018.

Alcohol is used in rum-running, the illegal business of smuggling alcoholic beverages where such transportation is forbidden by law.

Wine fraud relates to the commercial aspects of wine. The most prevalent type of fraud is one where wines are adulterated, usually with the addition of cheaper products (e.g. juices) and sometimes with harmful chemicals and sweeteners (compensating for color or flavor).

Moonshine is illegal to produce and sell in most countries. In Prohibition-era United States, moonshine distillation was done at night to deter discovery. Once the liquor was distilled, drivers called "runners" or "bootleggers" smuggled moonshine liquor across the region in cars specially modified for speed and load-carrying capacity.

Outbreaks of methanol poisoning have occurred when methanol is used to adulterate moonshine.

In Australia, a sly-grog shop (or shanty) is an unlicensed hotel, liquor-store or other vendor of alcoholic beverages, sometimes with the added connotation of selling poor-quality products.

Pruno also known as prison hooch or prison wine, is a term used in the United States to describe an improvised alcoholic beverage. It is variously made from apples, oranges, fruit cocktail, fruit juices, hard candy, sugar, high fructose syrup, and possibly other ingredients, including crumbled bread.

Most countries have laws specifically for the offense of drunk driving. Driving under the influence (DUI) or driving while intoxicated (DWI), is the crime of driving a motor vehicle while impaired by alcohol or other drugs (including those prescribed by physicians).

Public intoxication laws vary widely by jurisdiction, but include public nuisance laws, open-container laws, and prohibitions on drinking alcohol in public or certain areas.

== Health effects of alcohol ==
Short-term effects of alcohol consumption range from a decrease in anxiety and motor skills and euphoria at lower doses to intoxication (drunkenness), to stupor, unconsciousness, anterograde amnesia (memory "blackouts"), and central nervous system depression at higher doses. Consuming alcohol before bedtime can disrupt the stages of sleep. Long-term use can lead to an alcohol use disorder, an increased risk of developing physical dependence, cardiovascular disease, immune disorders, and several types of cancer. A 2023 meta-analysis concluded that low daily alcohol intake provides no health benefits and no effect on mortality, while increased consumption, even at relatively low levels of daily intake (more than two beverages for women and more than three beverages for men), may increase health- and mortality-risks.

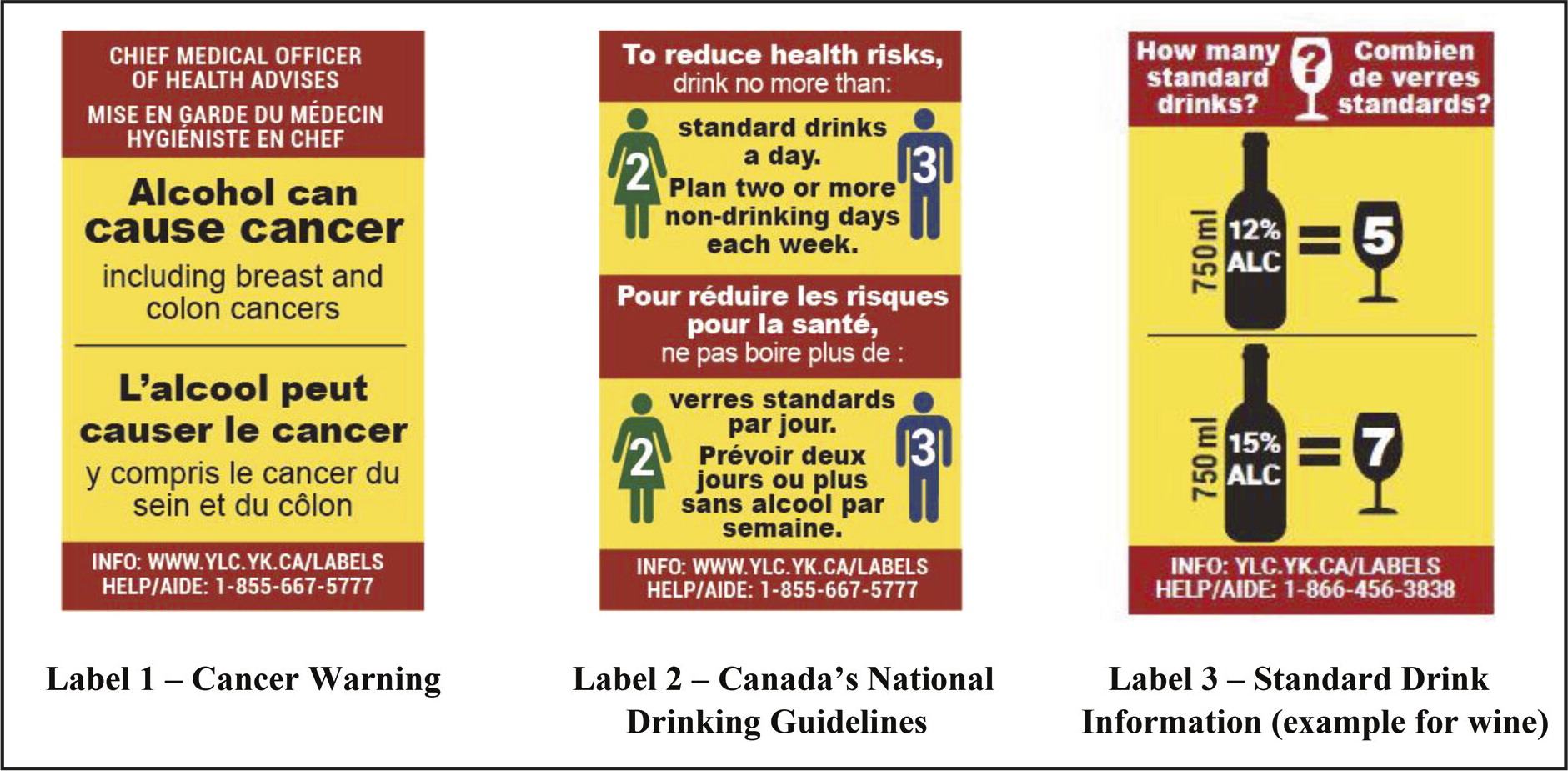
Intervention alcohol warning labels (actual size 5.0 cm × 3.2 cm each). The label intervention included three rotating labels: (a) a cancer warning, (b) national drinking guidelines, and (c) standard drink information (four separate labels were developed for wine, spirits, coolers, and beer; wine example shown above)

Some nations have introduced alcohol packaging warning messages that inform consumers about alcohol and cancer, as well as fetal alcohol syndrome. The addition of warning labels on alcoholic beverages is historically supported by organizations of the temperance movement, such as the Woman's Christian Temperance Union, as well as by medical organisations, such as the Irish Cancer Society.

The International Agency for Research on Cancer lists ethanol as a carcinogen and states that: "There is sufficient evidence and research showing the carcinogenicity of acetaldehyde (the major metabolite of ethanol) which is excreted by the liver enzyme when one drinks alcohol." The World Health Organization also considers alcohol to be a carcinogen (Group 1) with no quantity of consumption considered to be risk free. WHO estimates nearly half of alcohol-attributable cancers in the WHO European Region are linked to light or moderate drinking defined as "less than 1.5 litres of wine or less than 3.5 litres of beer or less than 450 millilitres of spirits per week".

Public awareness of the link between alcohol consumption and cancer is low in the U.S. In 2025, U.S. surgeon general Vivek Murthy supported the use of cancer warning labels on alcohol products.

== See also ==
- List of alcoholic drinks
- List of national drinks
- Liquor
- List of cocktails
- List of IBA official cocktails
- Alcoholic beverage industry in Europe
- Alcohol (chemistry)
- Homebrewing
