= Share of throat =

Unit of worldwide beverage consumption

Share of throat is a beverage industry term that refers to the proportion of the world's beverage consumption produced by a single company. The term was originally coined by Coca-Cola as "throat share", in order to measure how much of the world's beverages were theirs, but is now more commonly referred to as share of throat.
