= Drink industry =

Industry that manufactures and sells drinks

The drink industry (or drinks industry, also known as the beverage industry) produces drinks, in particular alcoholic beverages, ready to drink beverages, and soft drink products.

Drink production can vary greatly depending on the product being made. ManufacturingDrinks.com explains that "bottling facilities differ in the types of bottling lines they operate and the types of products they can run". Drinks may be packaged in glass bottles, plastic bottles, or metal cans. Innovations in the drink industry, catalysed by requests for non-alcoholic drinks, include hot-fill or cold-fill, drink plants, processing, and packing.

== Largest companies ==
Largest beverage companies worldwide in 2021:

Rank	Name	Country
1	AB InBev	Belgium
2	Nestlé	Switzerland
3	Coca-Cola Company	United States
4	PepsiCo	United States
5	Starbucks	United States
6	Heineken	Netherlands
7	Diageo	United Kingdom
8	Suntory	Japan
9	Keurig Dr Pepper	United States
10	Molson Coors	Canada/United States

== See also ==
- Alcoholic beverage
- Alcoholic beverage industry in Europe
- Brewing industry
- List of drinks
- Soft drink
- Bottled water
- Food industry
- Container-deposit legislation
- Beverage Digest
