= Beer snake =

Stacking of numerous plastic beer cups

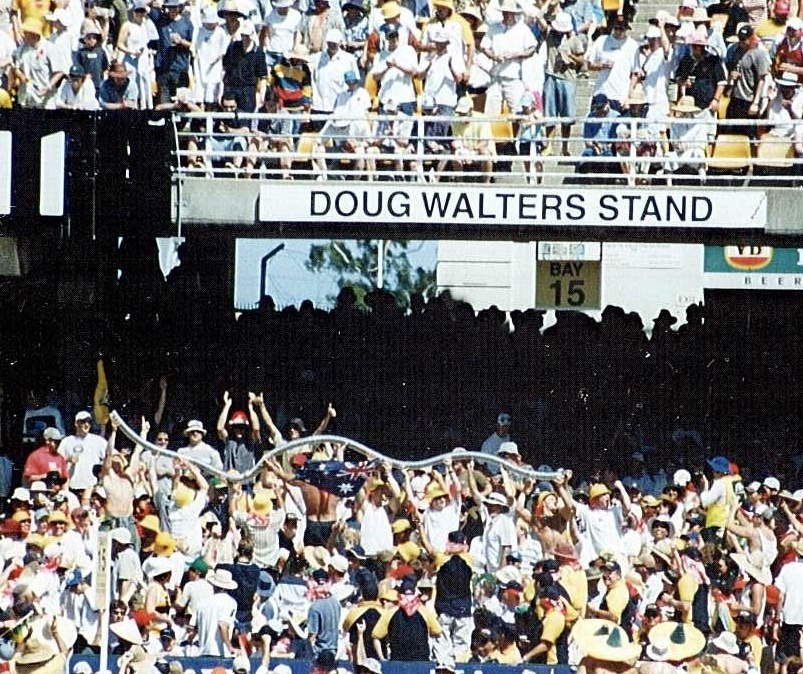
Beer snake on The Hill at The SCG in January 2004

A beer snake, or cup snake, is the stacking of numerous beer cups into a long, flexible structure that resembles a snake. Beer snakes are most commonly found at sporting events that are played out over many hours, such as cricket. Some snakes have been reported in the media as being up to 175 metres (574 ft) long. They are typically formed during breaks in play or when the outcome of the match is nearly certain; for example, when the fourth Test of the Pakistani cricket team in England in 2006 tour at The Oval was halted after ball-tampering allegations, a large beer snake was constructed in the OCS stand.

== Materials ==
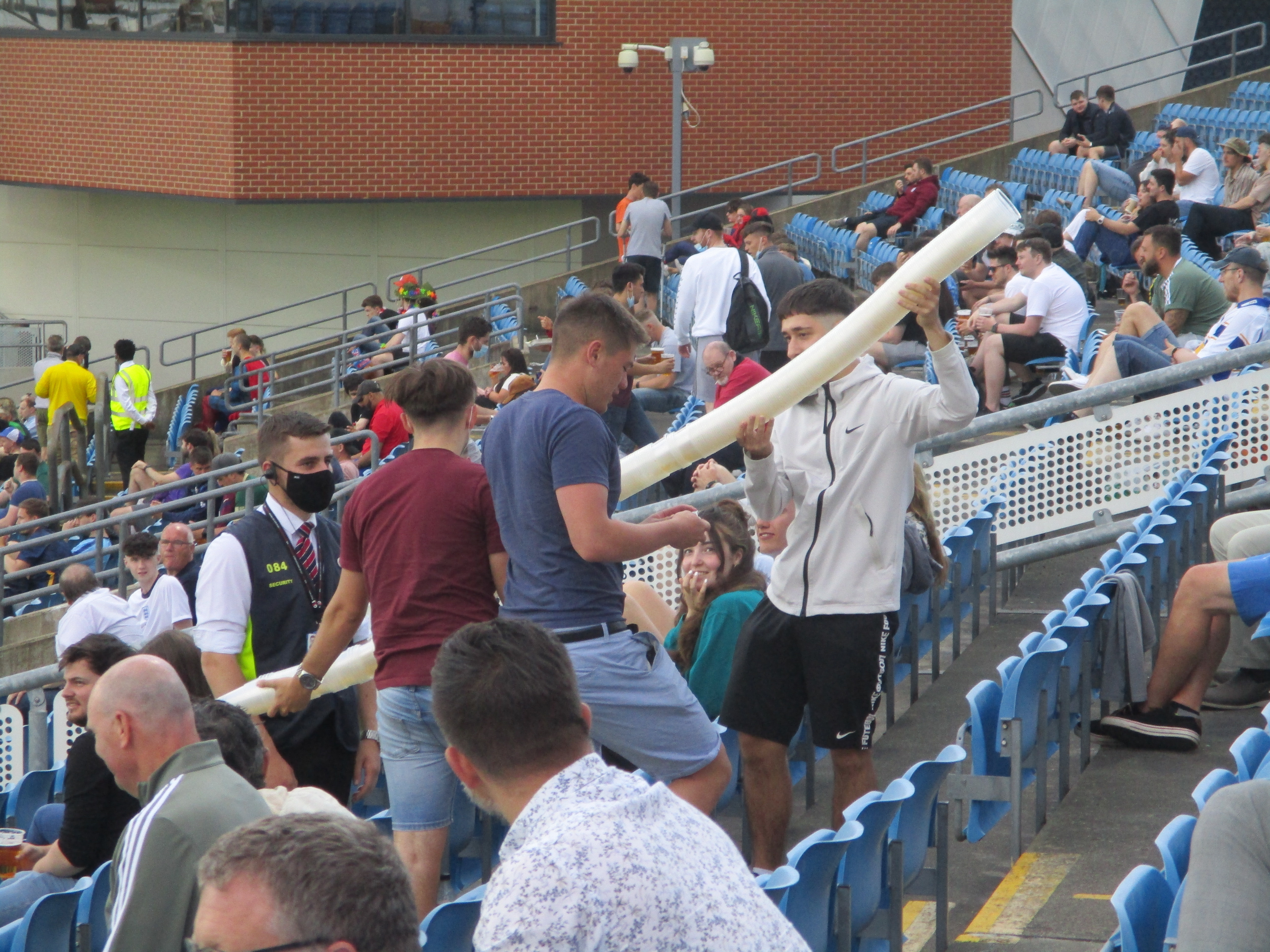
The beginning of the formation of a beer snake at Headingley Cricket Ground in 2021

A beer snake is made with a large number of empty plastic beer cups, usually those issued by the bars on site at the stadium. Many sports stadiums do not allow glass containers for safety reasons, and use plastic cups for serving beer. These plastic cups, once empty, provide the flexible building blocks for constructing the beer snake when inserted into each other.

== Origins ==
An early version of the beer snake, created by Eugene Mroz and his sons Peter and Michael, was recorded on June 24, 1969, at Wrigley Field in Chicago, United States, as documented in the Chicago Sun-Times edition published the next day. In January 1997, the first reported beer snake in Australia was constructed at the WACA Ground in Perth, Australia. A newspaper article in the Sydney Morning Herald cited Michael Gray as "The Snake Charmer" and architect of the social phenomenon.

== Procedure ==
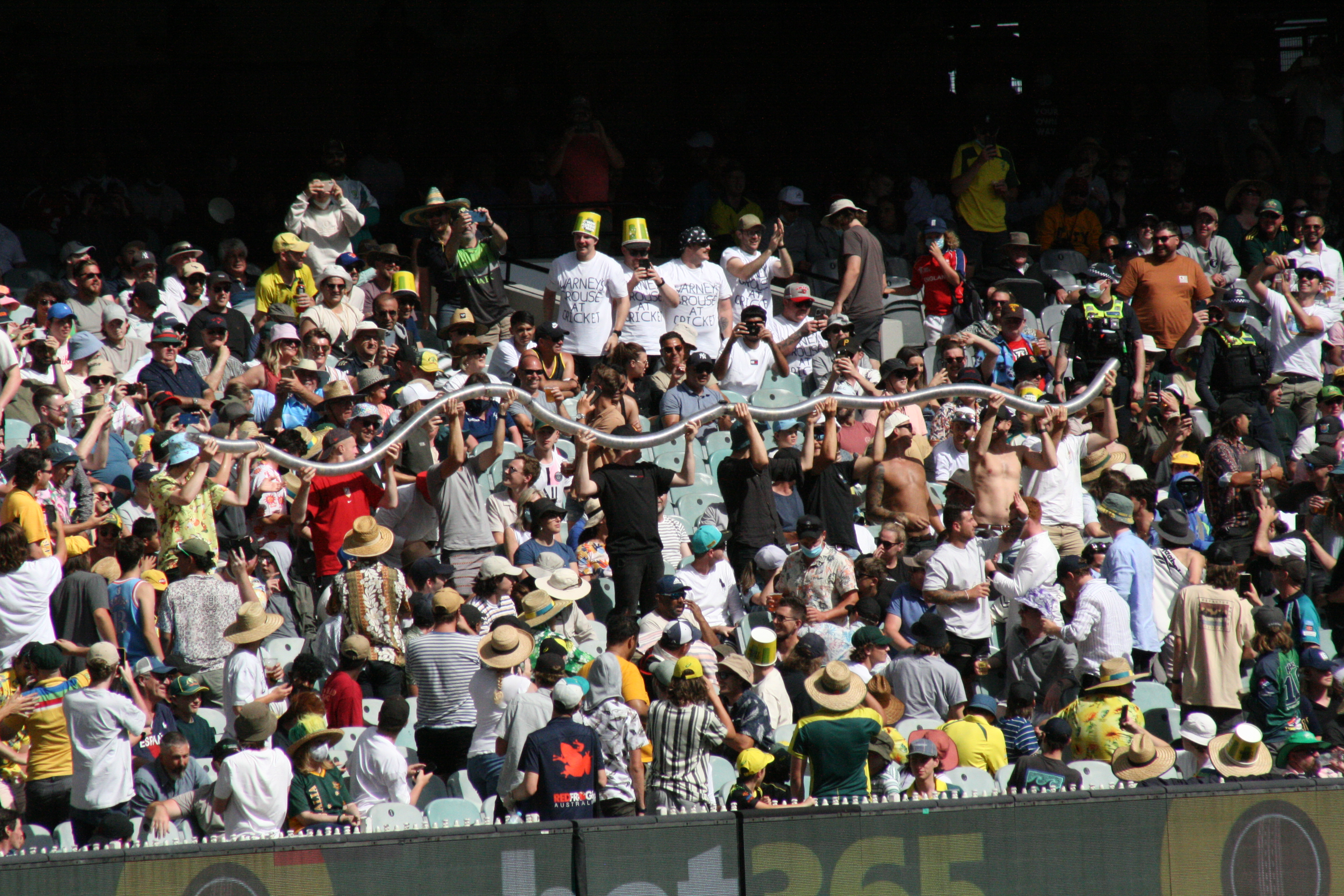
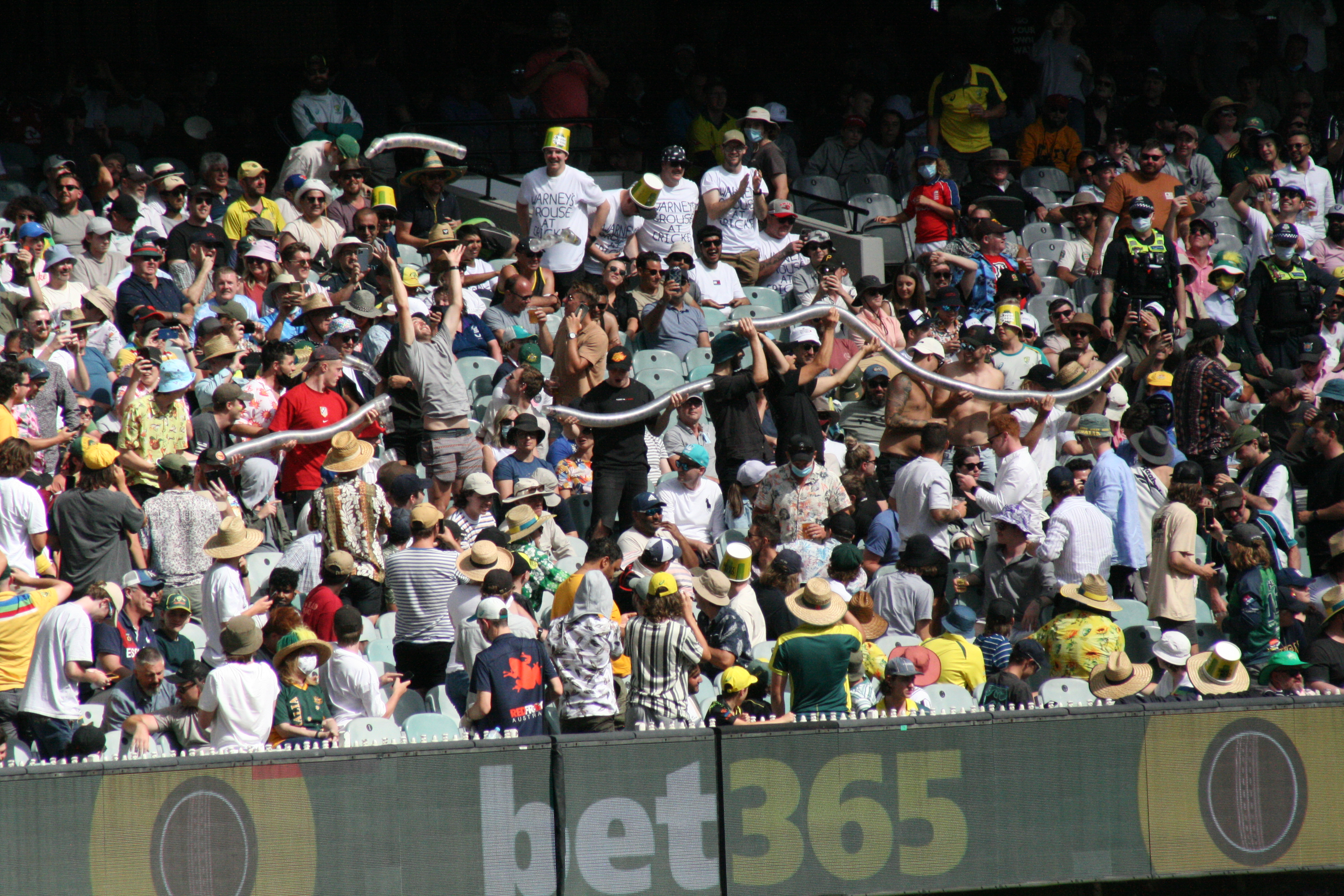
Beer cup snake before and after breakage during the 2021 Boxing Day Test

A large number of cups, gathered by a group of people, are stacked atop each other until they form a tube or 'snake'. Once the snake has reached a substantial length, it is held skyward to 'dance' as if being charmed. Multiple groups sometimes link their snakes together. Stadium staff may not let fans block aisles, so snakes sometimes grow in a series of hairpin turns within one section. An excessively large, heavy, or twisted snake may collapse.

Security staff at some sporting venues attempt to confiscate the empty cups from people attempting to build a beer snake. This is in part due to the potential dangers of such structures in crowded places, and also because the component cups are often not completely empty and will therefore spill beer on to spectators.

As a result of several minor injuries that occurred when a beer snake collapsed during a regular-season Canadian Football League game, and due to the risks posed by snakes that go between multiple levels of the stadium, the Winnipeg Blue Bombers banned the creation of beer snakes during their football games in 2010.

== Notable examples ==
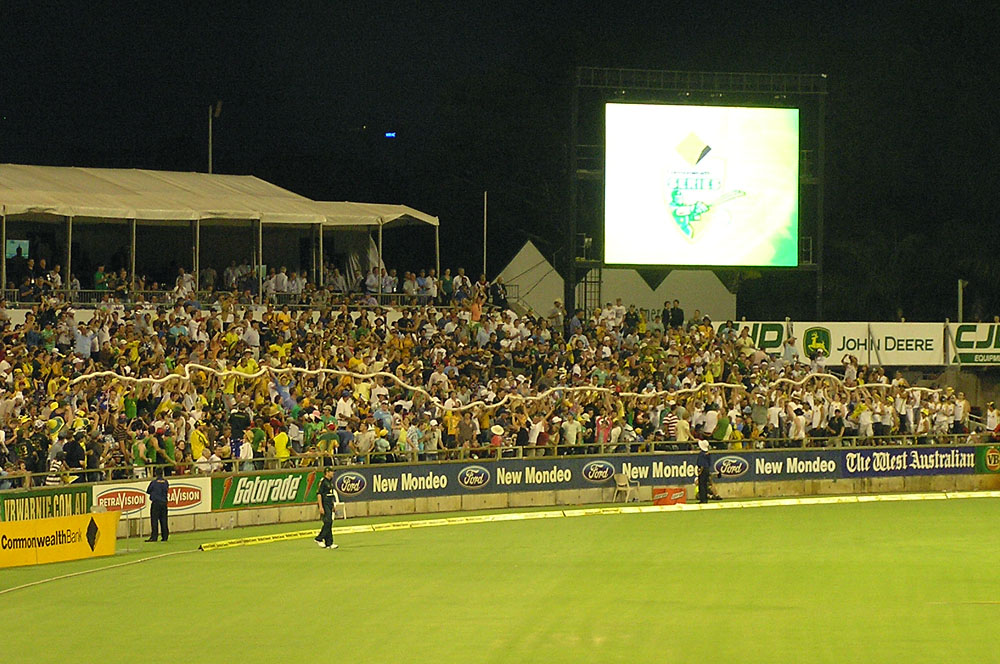
A long beer snake at a day-night match at the WACA on 15 January 2008

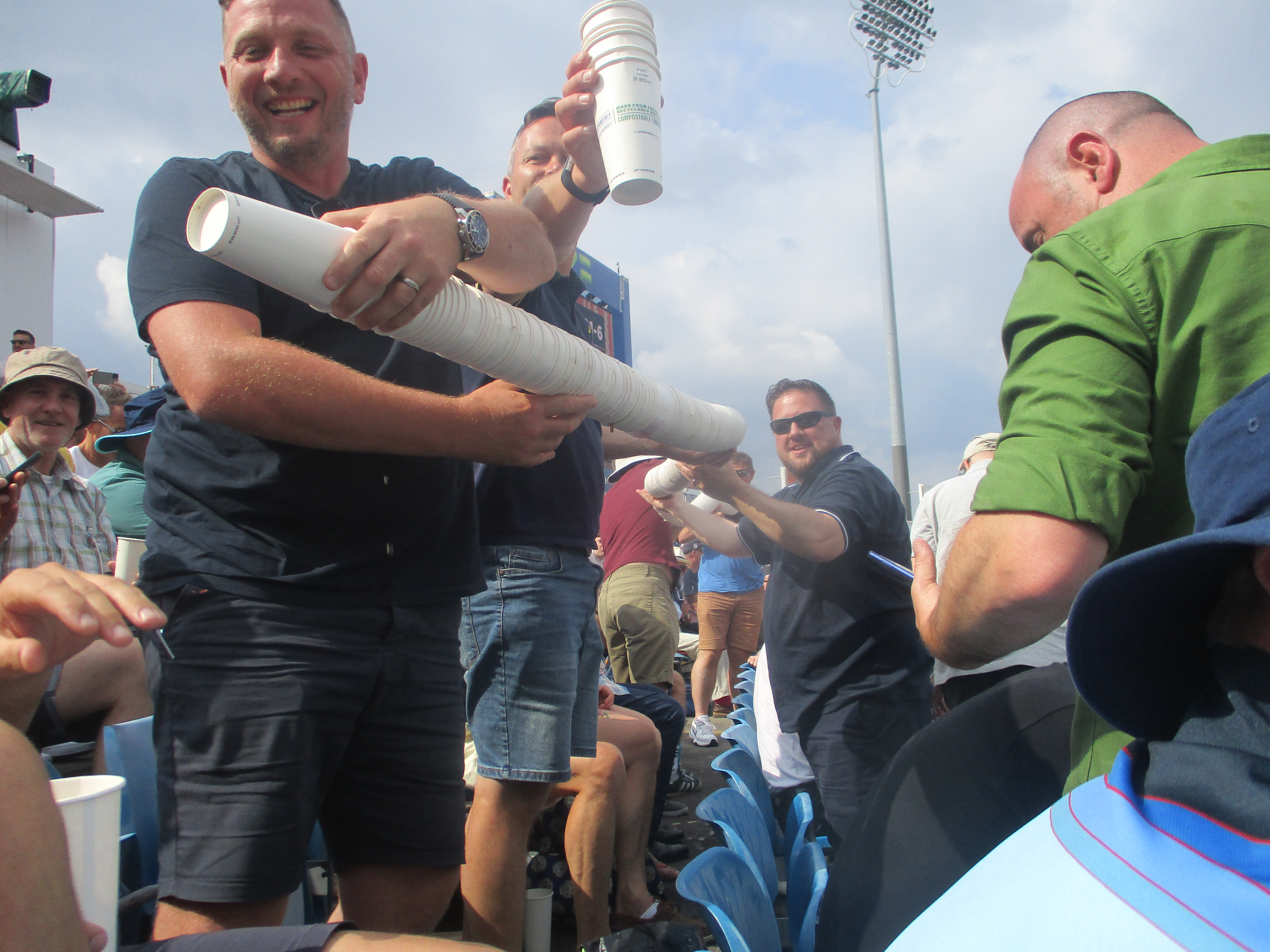
Spectators forming a beer snake during an England v New Zealand test at Headingley in 2022

- January 20, 2013: It is believed that the longest-ever beer snake was created during a two-hour rain delay at an Australia versus Sri Lanka one-day cricket match in Sydney, Australia. The snake was reported to have spanned the width of the SCG's Victor Trumper Stand. Christopher Douglas, who was in attendance, reports that it was between 100 and 175 metres (328 and 574 ft) long, beating the previous record held at the WACA Ground, Perth, Australia in 2007.
- March 8, 2020: During an XFL game between the DC Defenders and St. Louis BattleHawks at Audi Field, fans formed a beer snake with approximately 1,237 cups. XFL commissioner Oliver Luck also contributed to the snake with his own cup. Defenders fans had created an earlier beer snake, which was 75 feet (23 m) long, during a February 15 game against the New York Guardians.
- March 18, 2021: Colorado Mammoth fans break the record for longest cup snake, at 311 feet (95 m). The team worked with Ball Corporation to distribute empty, unused, recyclable aluminum cups to fans for use in the snake.
- June 4, 2021: Toronto Blue Jays fans at Sahlen Field in Buffalo, New York, constructed a 291-cup beer snake during a 13–1 blowout loss to the Houston Astros.
- June 13, 2021: Chicago Cubs fans formed an "insanely long" beer snake during a game against the St. Louis Cardinals.
- July 1, 2021: The St. Paul Saints' fans broke the record for the largest cup snake in North America, with a 102-foot (31 m) cup snake.
- July 3, 2021: Oakland Athletics fans create a massive beer snake during a game against the Boston Red Sox.
- November 30, 2021: Minnesota Wild fans and 10,000 Takes partner to bring the NHL its first Cup Snake and break the verified world record for largest cup snake, at 247 feet (75 m)
- February 19, 2023: DC Defenders fans at Audi Field created a beer snake which was taken away by security, leading to beer snake chants and the throwing of lemons onto the field. After the Defenders negotiated with Audi Field security and set new guidelines, the beer snake was permitted during the March 5 game against the Battlehawks.

== See also ==
- Beer wench
