= Beer wench =

Woman serving alcohol at a sporting event

Beer wench is a colloquial expression used in Australia to identify a young woman employed on a casual basis to attend cricket matches and serve alcoholic beverages, particularly beer, from the bar area within the stadium to spectators at their seats. Beer wenches ensure that patrons will not miss a single ball throughout the day's play by removing the need to queue at the bar for alcohol.

A beer wench will frequently be attired in a swimsuit, bikini or other costume which is intended to be both visually appealing and sexually provocative.

The practice of hiring beer wenches developed at the Sydney Cricket Ground and the Gabba during the late 1990s and, despite public criticism and being banned at some locations, persists at international cricket fixtures within Australia to this day.

The custom made international headlines during the 2006–07 Ashes series played between England and Australia when an Australian fan advertised on UK websites for an English beer wench to serve beer to Australian cricket fans during the Fourth Test at the Melbourne Cricket Ground.

== See also ==
- Beer snake
