= Beverage Digest =

American trade publication

- Beverage Digest Logo
- Industry: Media
- Founded: 1982
- Key people: Editor & Publisher: Duane D. Stanford, Jr.
- Services: News and information for the non-alcoholic beverage industry
- Owner: BD Media, LLC
- Website: Beverage Digest Website

Beverage Digest is a privately owned subscription publication covering the global beverage industry. The company, founded in 1982 by Jesse Meyers, sells premium market intelligence and data.

Beverage Digest organizes an annual conference, where senior industry executives share their views on trends.

== Publications ==
Beverage Digest publishes the Beverage Digest Fact Book, a twice-monthly newsletter, and a map book that outlines Coca-Cola and Pepsi franchise territories. Duane Stanford Jr., editor and publisher of Beverage Digest, also hosts a podcast called The Breeze.

Although the newsletter is written for executives in the non-alcoholic drinks industry, its articles are often cited in publications with a broader audience. The New York Times has based a number of articles in part on information first published by Beverage Digest. The Los Angeles Times has also cited the magazine as an authority in various stories. Forbes magazine, Yahoo! News and Reuters have also quoted the magazine.
