= Vinopolis =

Former wine attraction in London, England

Coordinates: 51°30′24″N 0°5′33″W

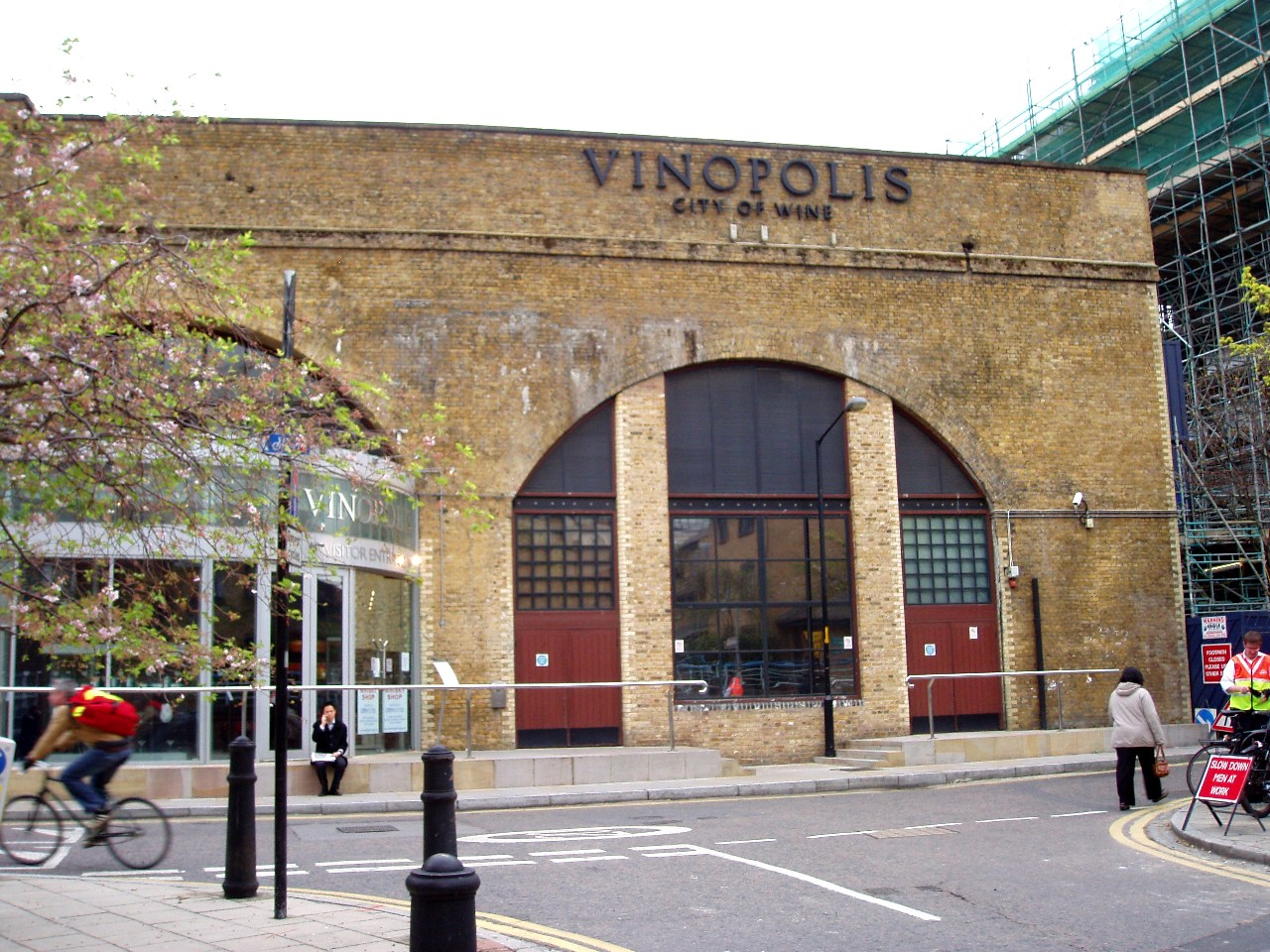
View of Vinopolis from Park Street

Vinopolis was a commercial visitor attraction in Southwark, London, England from 1999 to 2015, operated by Wineworld, London that presented the subject of wine and oenology through exhibits and wine tastings. Vinopolis closed permanently at the end of 2015.

== Overview ==
Vinopolis was located at Bankside, to the east of Southwark Bridge, and close to London Bridge on the southern side of the River Thames. There was an attached restaurant, Cantina Vinopolis, and wine was available for sale at the attached Laithwaites Wine Store. Vinopolis spanned 2.5 acres (10,000 m^{2}) and was devoted to the world of wine, including its history, development, and taste. Within the complex, there was a specialist whisky retailer, The Whisky Exchange, which offered a range of whiskies and other spirits. The Whisky Exchange also organized various whisky-tasting events throughout the year at Vinopolis.

== History ==
Vinopolis was developed by the wine merchant Duncan Vaughan-Arbuckle. He chose a site beneath the arches of a Victorian railway viaduct that was built in 1866 by the Southeastern Railway Company to carry an extension line from London Bridge Station over the Thames to the north bank.

Vinopolis opened on 23 July 1999. Its first program was a four-hour guided tour through static wine displays with tastings. The business evolved over the years, and at the time it closed, it operated as both a wine tour and a corporate events venue.

== Offerings ==
In July 2008, the attraction of the "Authentic Caribbean Rum Experience" was opened, which allowed attendees to sample a selection of Caribbean premium rums.

The last range of offerings was put in place in Autumn 2012. The site featured wines from around the world. Three self-guided "experience packages" were offered, called "essential", "classic" and "quintessential". Group packages and group guided tours were also available. The wines were served from enomatic dispensers to prevent spoilage.

Throughout the year, Vinopolis hosted a range of events featuring wine, spirits, and food. These included a selection of monthly "masterclasses" such as:

- "Welcome to wine" (on the first Sunday of each month)
- "Welcome to cheese and wine" (on the second Sunday of each month)
- "Cocktail-making masterclass" (on the first Thursday of each month)
- "Whisky masterclass" (on the third Thursday of each month)
