= Alcoholic beverage industry in Europe =

The alcoholic beverage industry in Europe is the source of a quarter of the world’s alcohol and over half of the world's wine production. Trade is even more centered on Europe, with 70% of alcohol exports and just under half of the world's imports involving the European Union (EU). Although the majority of this trade is between EU countries, the trade in alcohol contributes around €9 billion to the goods account balance for the EU as a whole.

At least 1 in 6 tourists returns from trips abroad with alcoholic drinks, carrying an average of over 2 liters of pure alcohol per person in several countries. Europe also has a problem with illegal transport of alcohol; the European High Level Group on Fraud estimated that 1.5 billion euros were lost to alcohol fraud in 1996.

Alcohol excise duties in the EU countries amounted to 25 billion euros in 2001, excluding sales taxes and other taxes paid within the supply chain – although 1.5 billion euros is given back to the supply chain through the Common Agricultural Policy.

Alcohol is also associated with a number of jobs, including over 750,000 jobs in alcoholic beverage (mainly wine) production. Further jobs are also related to alcohol elsewhere in the supply chain, e.g. in pubs or shops.
