= Margarita machine =

Margarita dispensing device

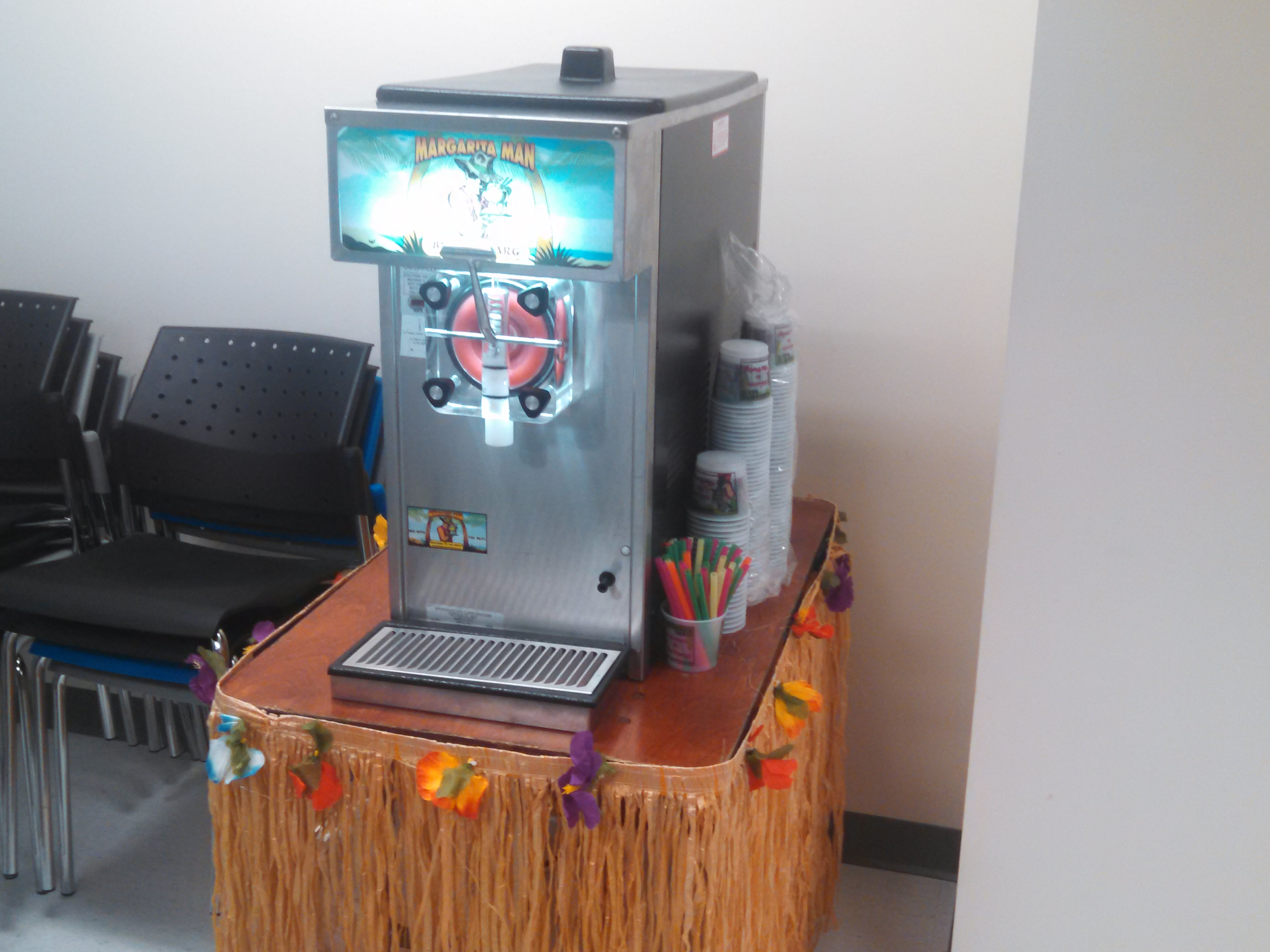
A margarita machine in Wakefield, Massachusetts

A margarita machine, also known as a frozen drink machine is a piece of commercial foodservice equipment which dispenses a frozen margarita. A margarita mix, traditionally lime flavored, is poured into the hopper, which can be refrigerated, and may contain a spinning agitator. From the hopper, the product flows into the freezing cylinder, where it is frozen and kept at the proper viscosity to serve. The user is able to dispense margaritas from such a device for extended periods of time without losing any quality in the taste of the margaritas. A margarita machine may be purchased from a foodservice distributor and is manufactured by companies such as Spaceman USA and Taylor Company.

== History ==
The invention of the world's first frozen margarita machine in 1971 by Mariano Martinez, a Dallas restaurateur, marked a significant milestone in cocktail history. This development was a response to the challenges faced in his restaurant, Mariano's Mexican Cuisine, due to the high demand for margaritas.

Before the advent of the margarita machine, frozen margaritas were typically made using a blender. This method was popularized by the introduction of the Waring Blendor in 1937, invented by Fred Waring. Mariano's father used a traditional recipe he learned while working at a San Antonio speakeasy in 1938, which included ice, triple sec, hand-muddled limes, 100 percent blue agave tequila, and a splash of simple syrup.

The legalization of liquor by the drink in Texas in 1970, following a state constitutional amendment, enabled Martinez to open his restaurant. The popularity of his family's margarita recipe was initially met with enthusiasm, but the labor-intensive process of making them in a blender led to challenges.

Martinez's innovation came when he realized the potential of using a machine for a more consistent margarita. Initially considering a Slurpee machine, he eventually adapted a secondhand soft-serve ice cream machine to make his margaritas. This adaptation involved tweaking the traditional Recipe to create a uniform slush without diluting the alcohol's flavor.

In 2005, the Smithsonian's National Museum of American History acknowledged the cultural and historical significance of Martinez's invention by acquiring his original frozen margarita machine. This acquisition highlights the margarita machine's role in transforming the frozen margarita from a regional specialty to a national favorite cocktail.

The invention of the frozen margarita machine by Mariano Martinez in 1971 not only revolutionized the way margaritas were made but also had a significant impact on the popularity of Tex-Mex food and the structure of Tex-Mex restaurants.

== Characteristics ==
Margarita machines remove heat from a drink mix using a Vapor-compression refrigeration system (VCRS). The product is fed into the freezing cylinder where it is agitated by an beater or auger, and frozen. The freezing cylinder is also referred to as the evaporator. Once the product is frozen, it can be dispensed through the discharge door by manually pulling the handle. Margarita machines can use any combination of ingredients, as long as the brix value is between 12 and 18.

A brix below 12 will lead to over freezing and a brix of over 18 will be hard to freeze and too sweet.
