= Wine dispenser =

Device for serving and preserving wine

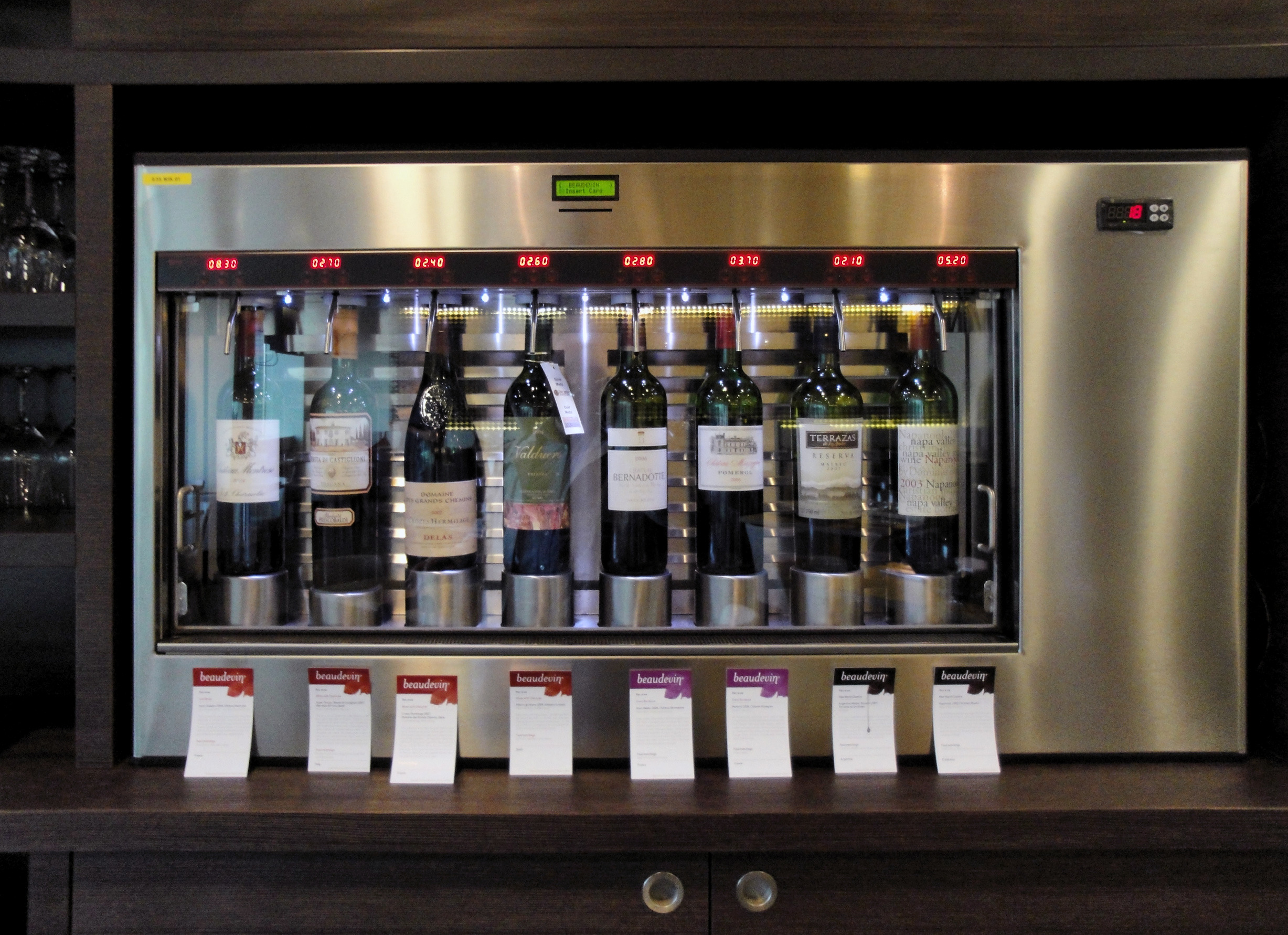
A wine dispenser

Wine dispensers are devices designed to serve and preserve wines. Dispensers store stored wines at cool temperatures and oxygen is prevented from entering the bottle when pouring. Wine dispensers vary greatly in use and function, most commonly wine dispensers are used in restaurants and bars to prevent spoilage when selling wine by the glass. The dispenser has the additional benefits of controlling the amount of the pour limiting over-pour.

== History ==
Wine preservation dates back to 6000 B.C.E around modern-day Georgia. It is believed that the ancient society sealed the wine vats with beeswax and buried them. This allowed the wine to go through another round of fermentation that made it more potent.
