= Burton ale =

Dark and sweet type of strong ale

Burton ale is a type of strong ale which is dark and sweet. It is named after the brewing town of Burton-on-Trent.

Burton ales were generally aged and needed cellaring for months before serving, and almost certainly had some degree of secondary fermentation going on during that time. In London, the terms Burton ale and old ale were interchangeable, but compared to other old ales and barley wines Burton ale is distinctively dark, sweet and fruity.

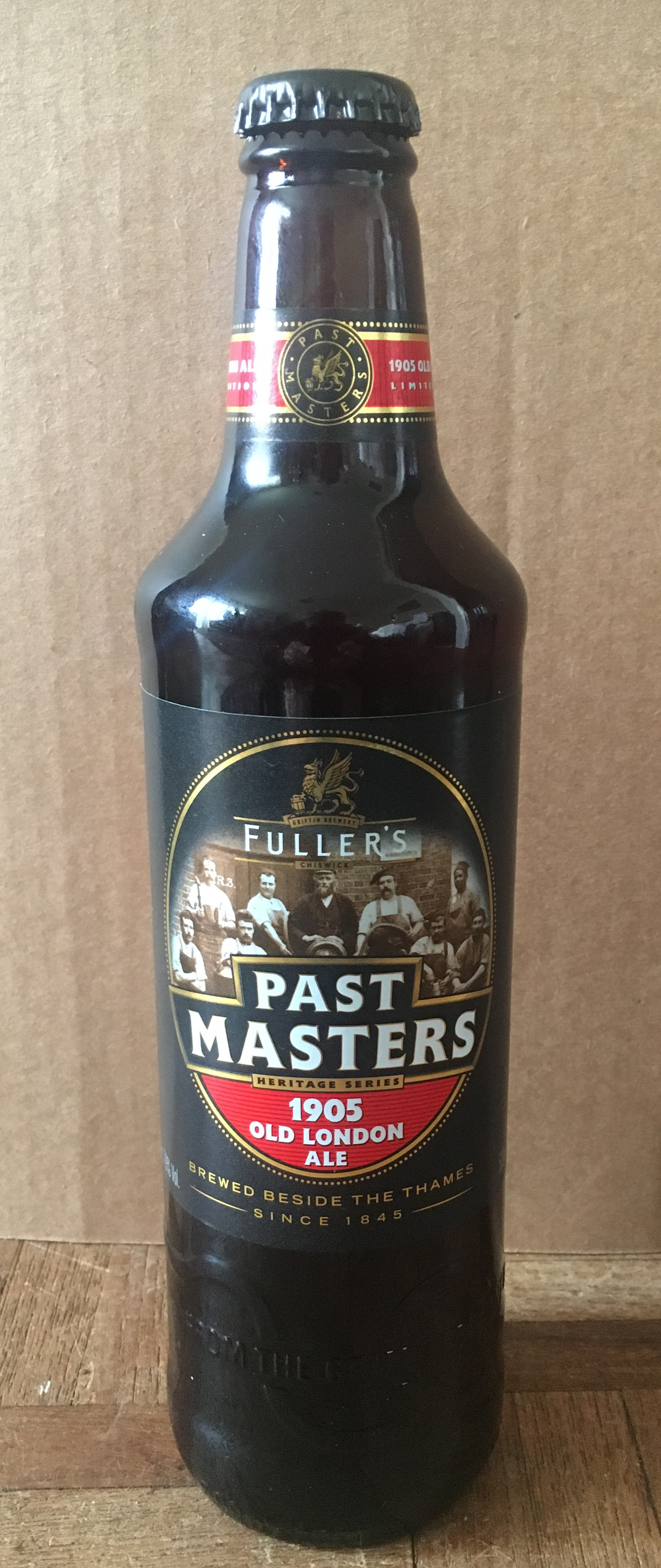
A bottle of Fuller's Old London Ale, ABV 7.9%, brewed to an Old Burton recipe from 1905.

== Old Burton ==
Old Burton is a strong version of Burton ale. Allsopp's Arctic Ale, first brewed in 1852 for Captain Edward Belcher's expedition to search for Sir John Franklin, was originally 11.24% ABV. The subsequent McClintock Arctic Expedition also took Burton ale. Old Burton was referenced in The Wind in the Willows: "The Rat, meanwhile, was busy examining the label on one of the beer-bottles. 'I perceive this to be Old Burton', he remarked approvingly. 'Sensible Mole! The very thing![']"

== Burton ale ==
Like most mediaeval monasteries, Burton Abbey, established early in the eleventh century, possessed its own brewhouse able to cater for the needs of both residents and travellers. The excellence of its products had gained national recognition by the mid-fourteenth century according to contemporary literature. With the dissolution of the abbey in 1540 ownership of the brewhouse passed to the Paget family who did much to encourage the economic development of the town and the surrounding area. Part of this development was the malting of local barley and the brewing of ale at many of the town's inns. Account books from the 1470s for a north Derbyshire gentry family, the Eyres of Hassop, record the purchase of Burton ale. A Burton brewer assisted in conveying messages hidden in barrels to and from Mary, Queen of Scots during her captivity in the 1580s at Tutbury Castle in Staffordshire.

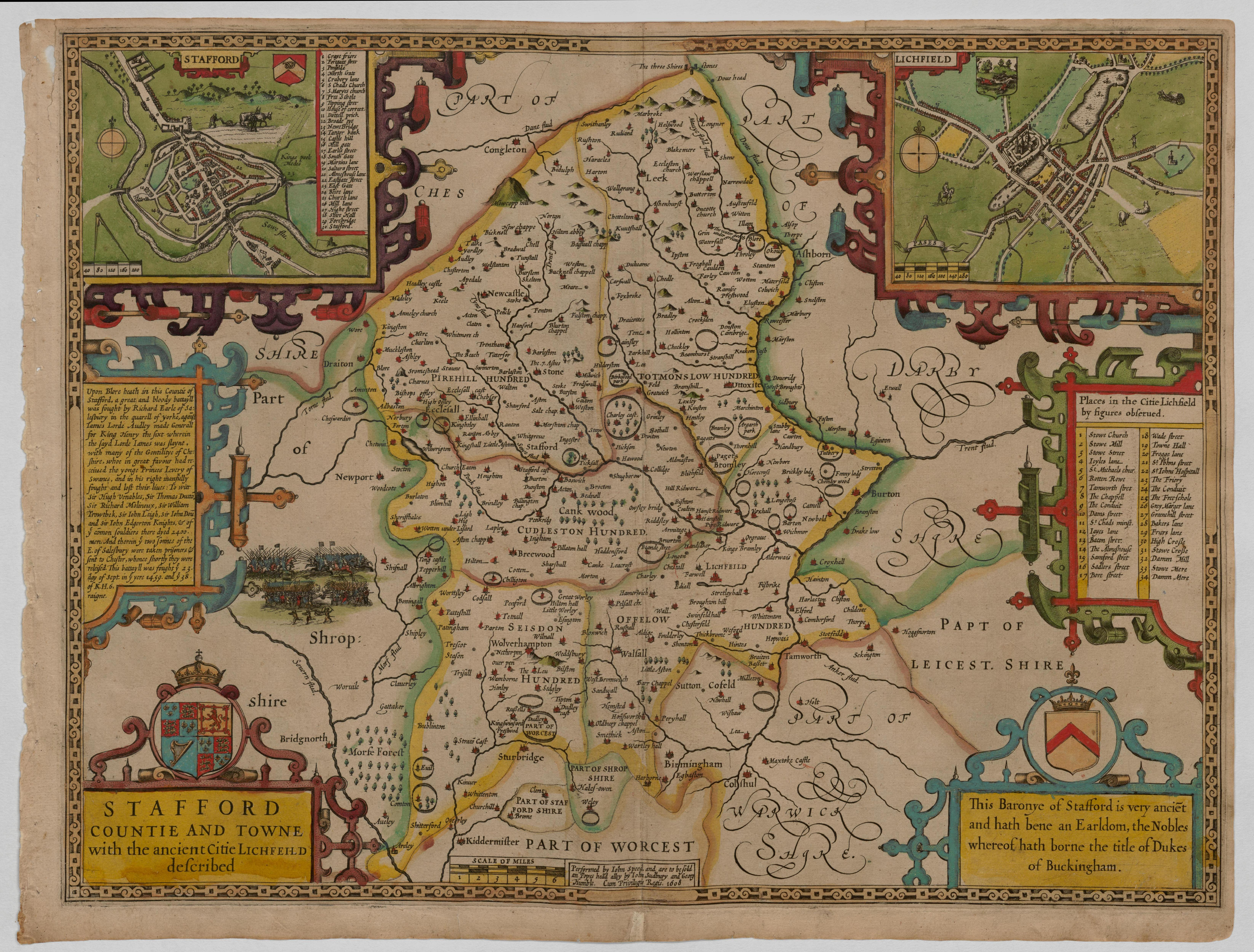
Map of Staffordshire in 1610, showing Burton in the east of the county, on the border with Derbyshire

In the 17th century, the Trent valley became more widely noted in London as the source of fine (and expensive) ales, both bottled and in cask. Pepys' Hull ale, Nottingham, Derby and Burton ale, are often mentioned in the literature of the times; and in household accounts they are usually priced per dozen bottles rather than by cask. Prices varied very much, but, when compared with standard London prices for a quart pot of strong drink, they are always in another class, being designed for the fashionable market. In the seventeenth century, the literary evidence (in the absence of production figures), suggests that Nottingham and Derby enjoyed precedence over Burton in the London market. This is probably more from the economic advantages of better transport than an intrinsic superiority of product. Not until the next century did the fame of Burton ale develop in the Baltic area, and then reflect back to its advantage in London and elsewhere. Burton experienced a period of decline in the 17th century, the number of innkeepers falling from 57 in 1624 to 38 in 1656. In 1694, the town was described as "very much ruined and decayed in its buildings and the inhabitants in general much impoverished". Hull and Darby Ales were listed as famous types of ale in a humorous work of 1637 by John Taylor, 'the water poet', and Ashbourne Ale was mentioned in The Compleat Angler of 1653.

One source says that Burton ale was first sold in London "about the year 1630", but there does not appear to be supporting evidence for this date. John Stevenson Bushnan, a 19th-century medical expert, wrote that, "In 1623 Burton Ale made itself known in London, as Darbie or Derby, from which town it used to reach London".

== Burton ale established in London ==
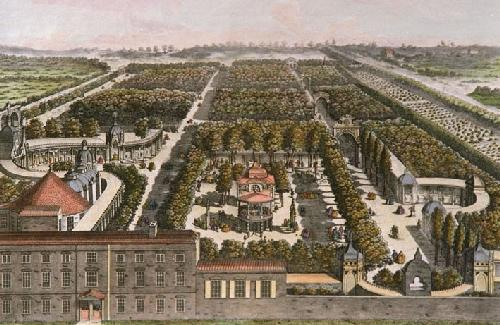
Vauxhall Gardens

In the early 18th century the fame of Derby Ale in London was eclipsed by that of its close neighbour, Burton ale. The Spectator magazine for 20 May 1712 says that a visit to the Vauxhall Gardens might be concluded "with a glass of Burton ale and a slice of hung beef". In the same year, Burton ale was being sold in London for 7s/6d per dozen bottles. A guidebook of 1722 notes that "Burton is the most famous town in England for [ale] … and indeed the best character you give to ale in London, is calling it Burton ale; from whence they send vast quantities to London: yet they brew at London some that goes by that denomination." A guide to public houses in the City of London around 1718 refers to the feat of drinking a yard of ale:

Here in tall Glass that has the Maids regards,
Who still must like what's a full measur'd Yard,
Large quantities of Burton Ale are swill'd
By Gangs of Warehouse-Men in Traffick skill'd.

A publication of 1727 lists 36 kinds of malt liquor being sold in London, including Burton ale, Derby ale and Litchfield ale.

== Burton ale in the 18th and early 19th century; development of the export trade ==
Portrait of Catherine the Great by Johann Baptist von Lampi the Elder

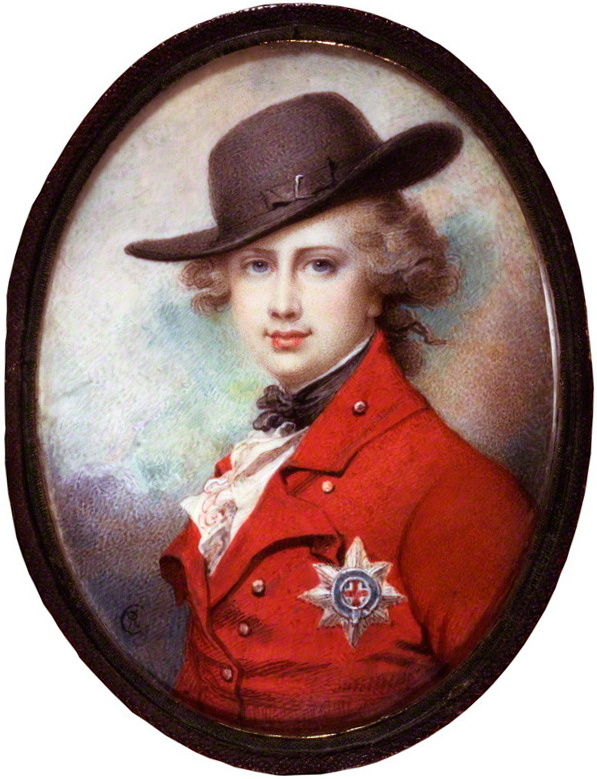
George IV as Prince of Wales, early 1780s

In around 1708, Benjamin Printon (1680–1728) established a brewery, later bought by John Musgrove, which is considered to be the start of the foreign export trade in Burton ale. Other breweries in Burton-on-Trent soon followed, including the businesses of Benjamin Wilson (established 1742), William Worthington (1761) and William Bass (1777). It was Burton ale that built both the reputations and fortunes of the Burton brewers. Exports were facilitated by the opening in 1712 of the Burton Trent Navigation, constructed by George Hayne.

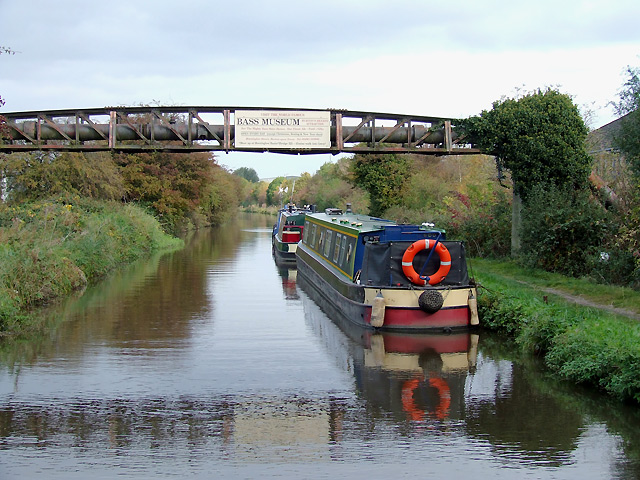
Trent and Mersey Canal at Burton-upon-Trent

The extension of the Trent enabled Burton brewers to increase their annual beer sales in London from 638 barrels in 1712 to 1,000 barrels in 1722. The Trent navigation connected Hull with the Baltic ports, and the facilities thus offered for the introduction of the Burton ales were promptly taken advantage of, and by the year 1748 a considerable trade had already been established in the Baltic, the principal port for which was St Petersburg, where the ale obtained a ready sale at high prices. Both Peter the Great and the Empress Catherine are said to have been fond of this beverage, which was then high coloured and sweet, and of remarkable strength. Stout was also exported to Russia. Stebbing Shaw, the historian of Staffordshire, recorded in the 1790s, using notes prepared in the 1730s by the antiquary Richard Wilkes, that "so great is the celebrity of this place for its ale brewed here, that, betides a very considerable home consumption, both in the, country and in London, (where it was first sold at the Peacock in Gray's-Inn-lane, a house still celebrated for the vending of this liquor), vast quantities have been exported to Sweden, Denmark, Russia, and many other kingdoms."

Transport was further aided by improved roads (the Burton to Lichfield and Burton to Derby roads were turnpiked in 1729 and 1753 respectively) and the construction of the Trent and Mersey Canal in 1777. "Fine Burton Ale in hogsheads" was sold on Wall Street in New York City by 1770. As early as 1726 Burton ale was sent to South Carolina, according to Francis Nicholson (Governor 1721–1725).

During consideration of the Malt Duties Act 1780 Sir William Bagot, Member of Parliament for Staffordshire, proposed a clause in favour of the brewers of Burton ale, to exempt them from the new tax, because they brewed not for home consumption, but exportation. Lord North said the clause would open a door to fraud, and consequently it ought not to be admitted. The motion therefore was rejected. When the Russian government imposed a prohibitive tariff on beer imports in 1822, Samuel Allsopp introduced a less sweet and more bitter version of Burton ale and marketed it across England and as far as Australia.

Not all Burton ale was exported and there were many enthusiasts at home. The poet John Langhorne "passed many of his convivial hours at the Burton ale house in Gray's-inn Lane, where he took liberal draughts of a potent liquor, for which that house [the Peacock] is well known by the lovers of the infusion of malt". In the 1780s these included the future George IV

In the 1790s, Charles Lamb, the writer, John Mathew Gutch, the journalist, and James White, founder of the UK's first advertising agency, met at the Feathers in Hand Court, Holborn, to drink Burton ale. In 1806. it was noted that "Burton ale is accounted excellent, and great quantities are sent down the river to Hull, and exported to other parts of the kingdom and abroad". It was said in 1810 that "the ale made at Burton-upon-Trent in Staffordshire is smooth, extremely heady, but not clear", and in 1816 that "Burton ale is reckoned the best of any brought to London." William Cornelius Offley's Burton ale House in Henrietta Street, Covent Garden was a noted tavern and eating house in the early 19th century. Burton ale was also enjoyed at the University of Oxford, although Brasenose College insisted that its ale was better than all.

== Burton ale from the early 19th century to the mid 20th century: co-existence with pale ales ==
Strong Burton ale co-existed with the pale ales and India pale ales for which Burton-on-Trent became famous from the 1820s. However, opinions about these ales differed. One writer in 1827 mused:

How various are the tastes of men in the matter of malt-liquor! One … will drink nothing but the luscious Burton - almost innocent of hops; whilst [another] detests the honey-sweet draught, and regales upon beer of most bitter brewage: some affect the new, and some the old.

A couple of devotees of the original strong Burton ale wrote:

From India the taste for the thinner bitter ales was brought back to this country, and for many years bitter beers were considered a kind of panacea for want of appetite, loss of digestive power, and many other deranged conditions with which it had no relation. A sort of false appetite for bitterness was stimulated, and less attention was paid to the other valuable characteristics of beer than to the two fashionable requirements - that of paleness and excess of hop flavour.

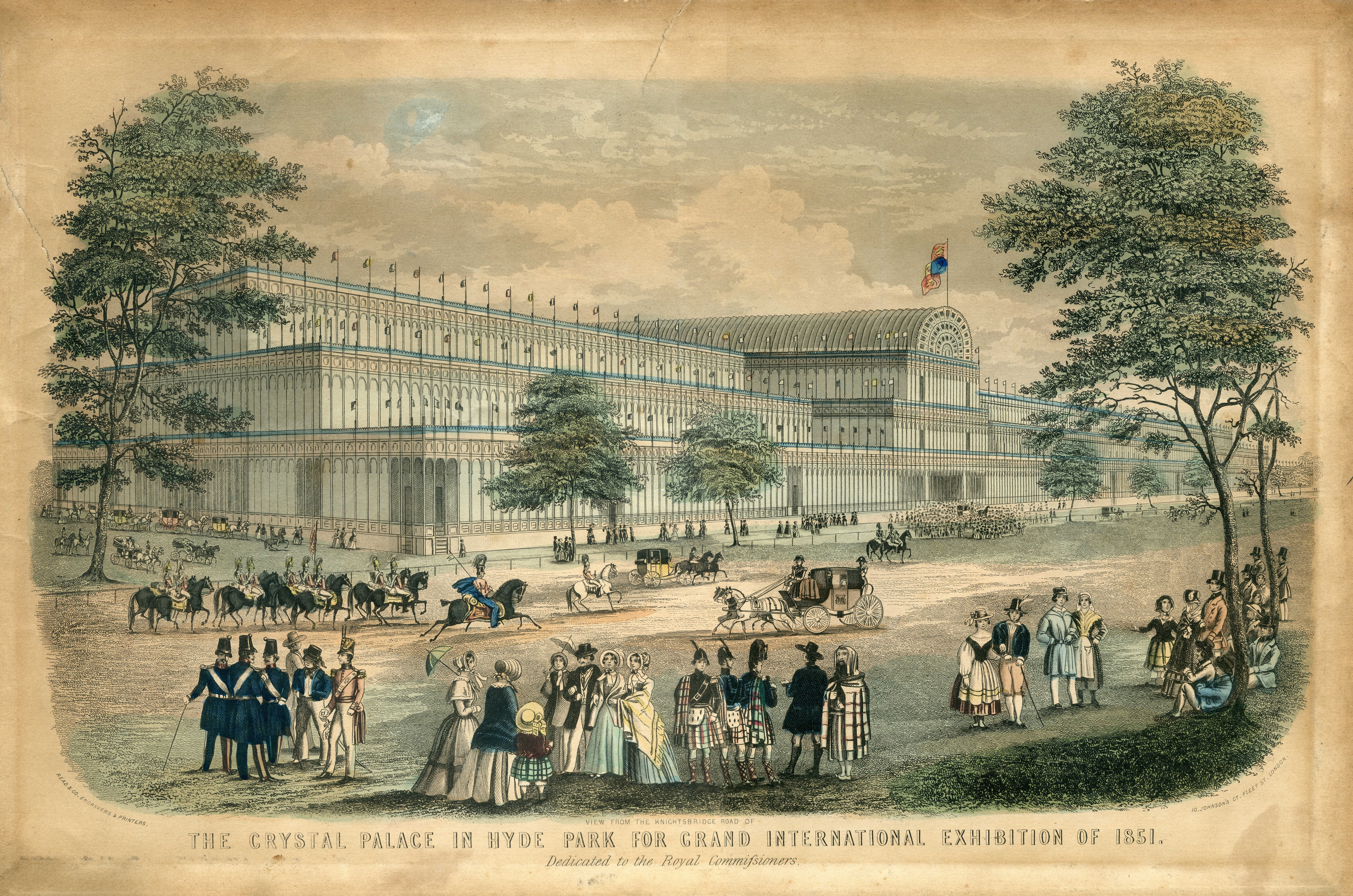
The Great Exhibition 1851

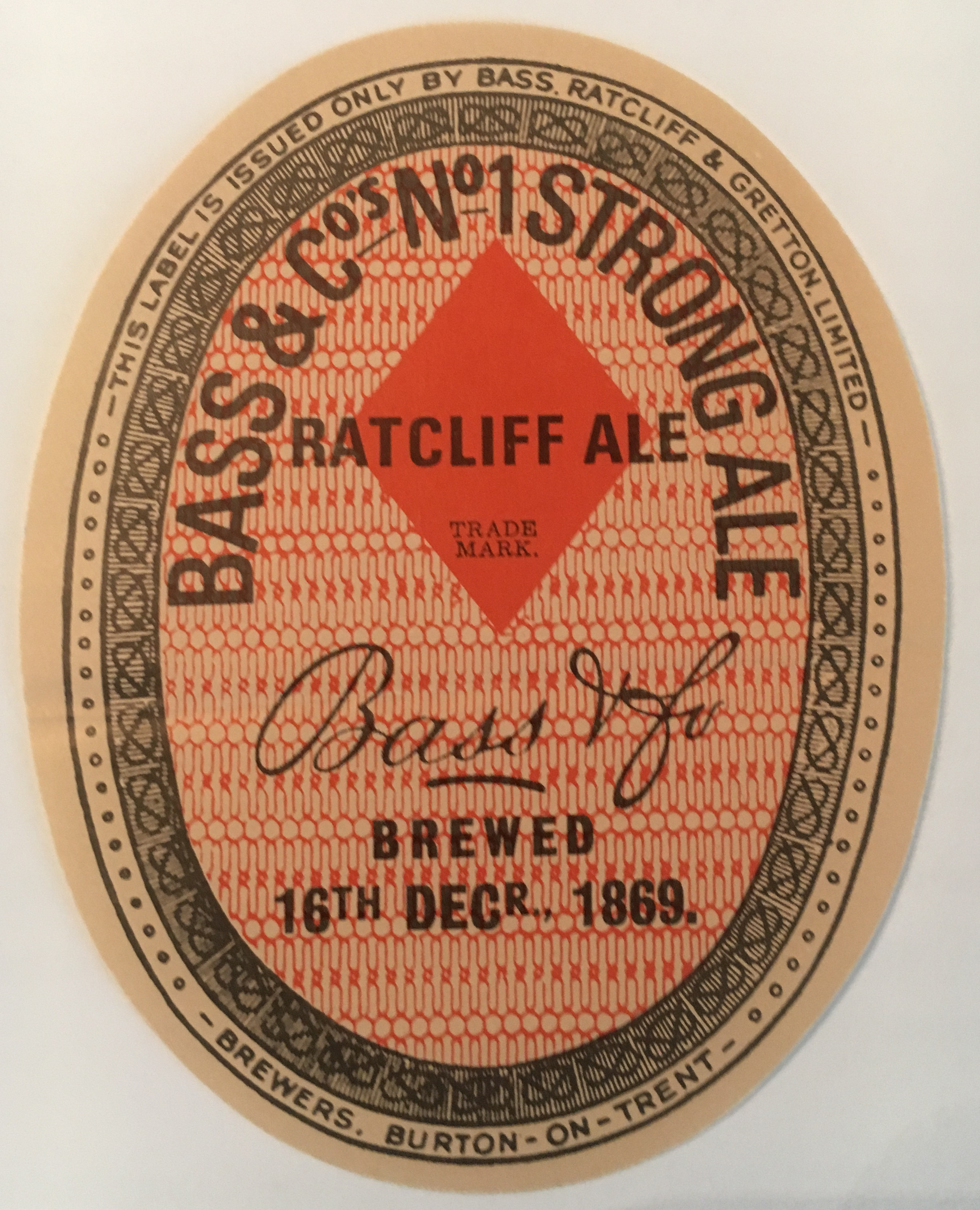
Bottle label for Bass No 1 Strong Burton Ale: Ratcliff Ale brewed 16 December 1869

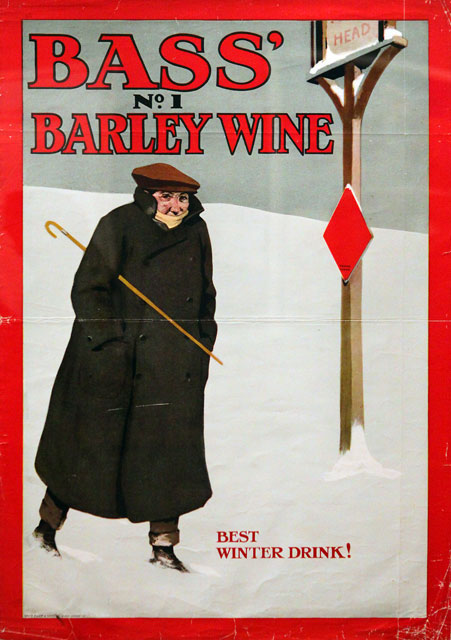
Advertisement for Bass' No.1, showing the Bass Red Diamond used for its Burton ales

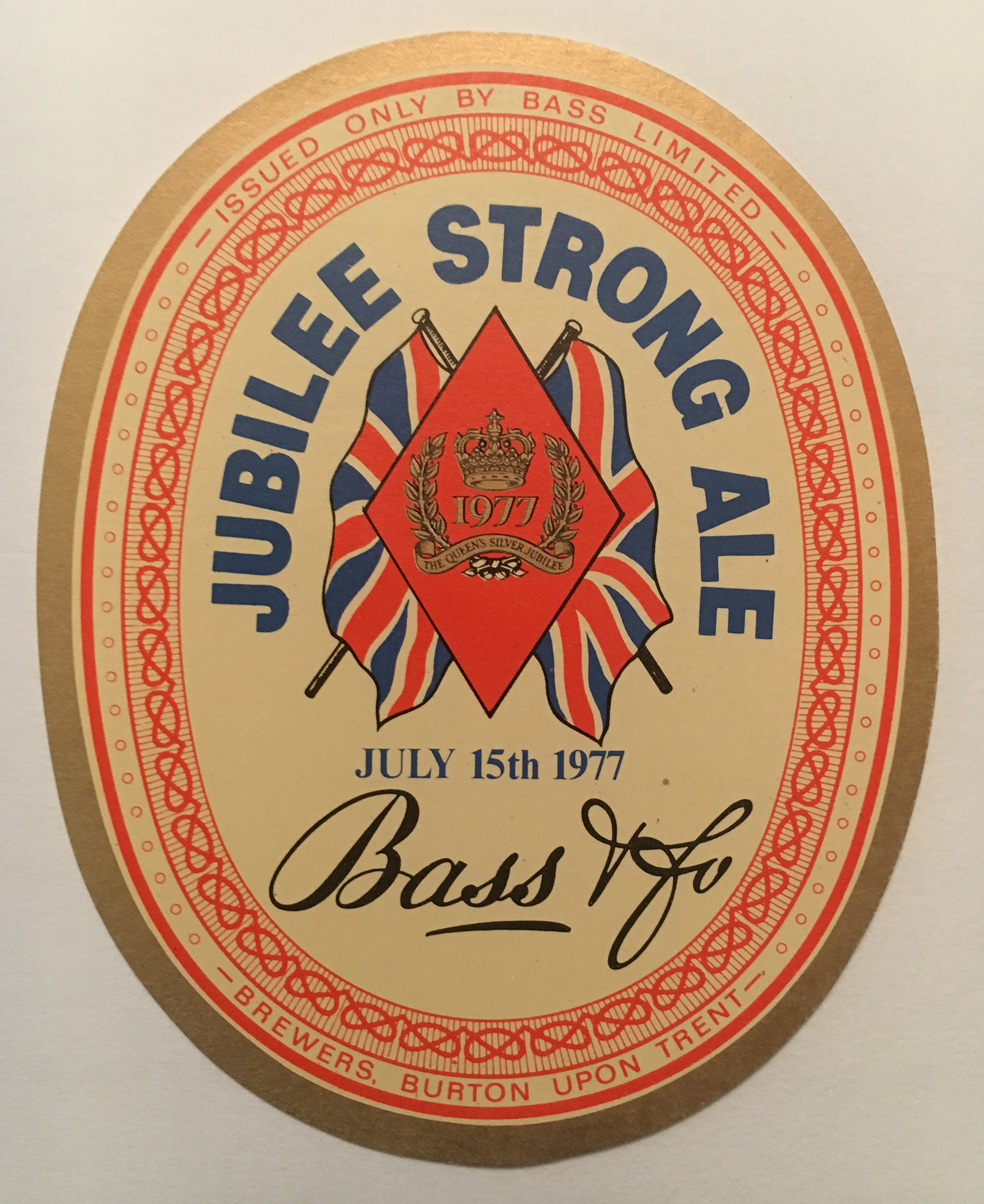
Bottle label for Bass Jubilee Strong Burton Ale 1977, brewed for the Silver Jubilee of Elizabeth II

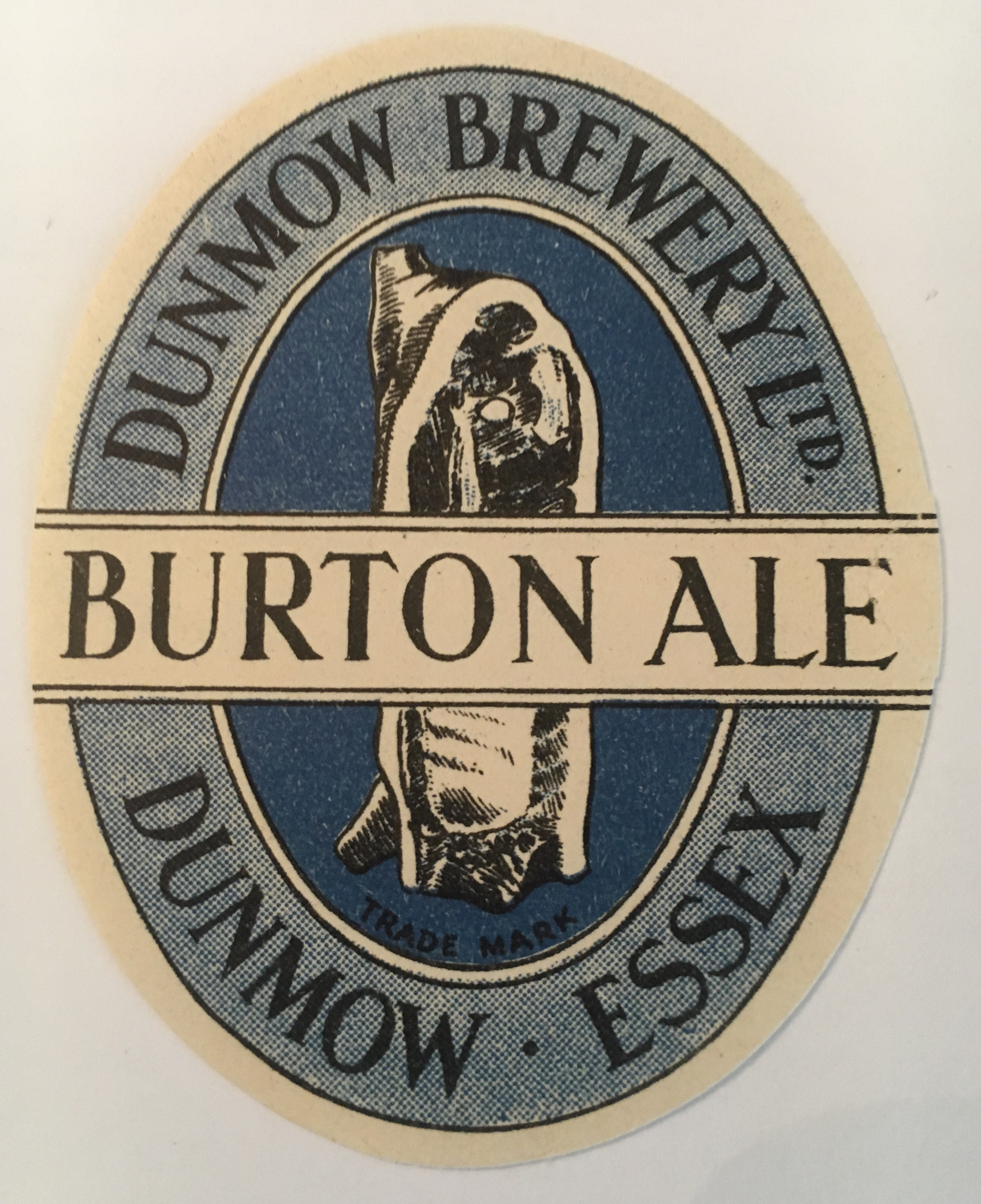
Bottle label for Dunmow Brewery Burton ale, c. 1950s

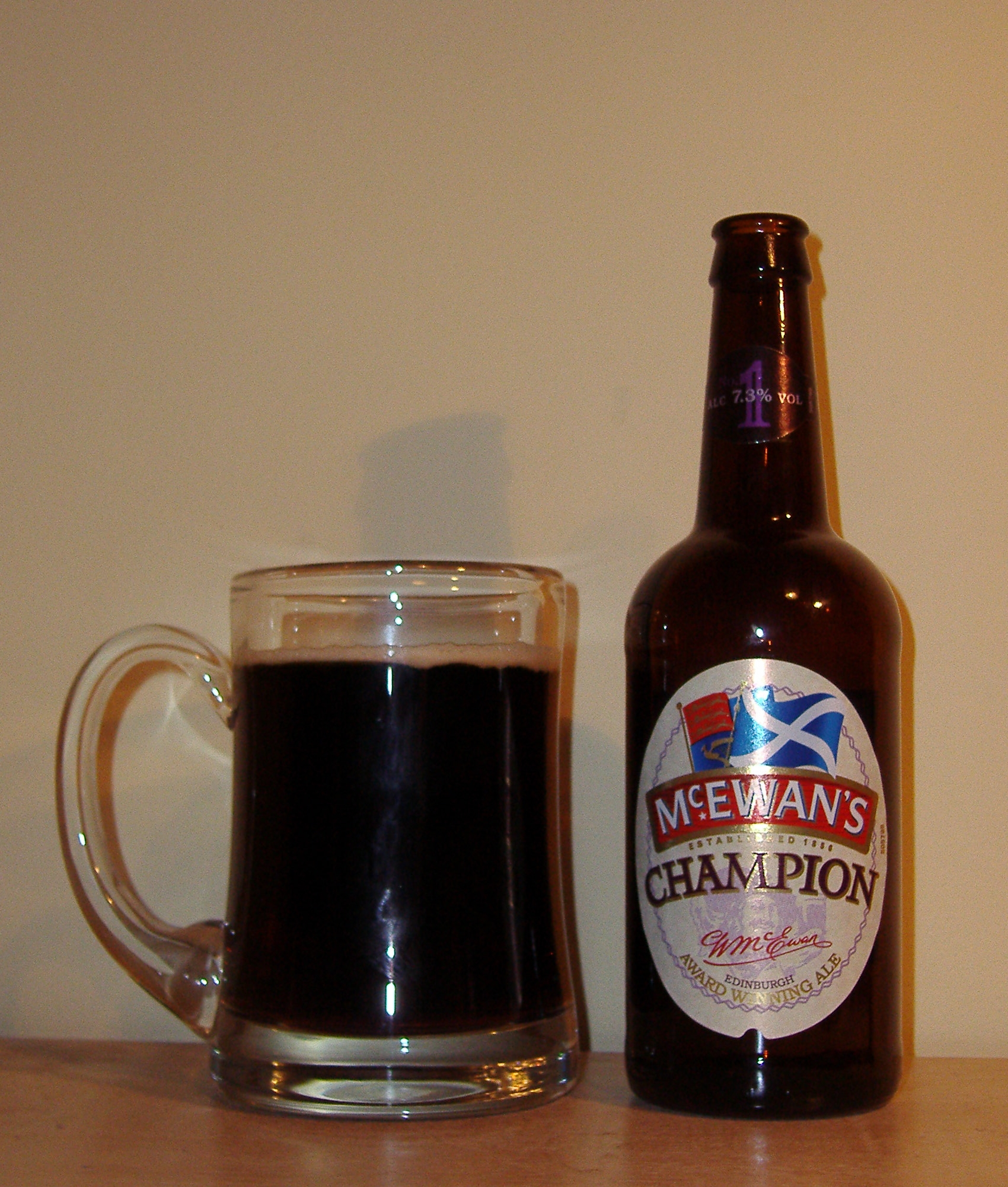
McEwan's Champion Ale, a Burton or Edinburgh Ale

Samuel Allsopp & Sons expanded rapidly under the direction of Henry Allsopp, 1st Baron Hindlip. The catalogue of The Great Exhibition in 1851 advertised:

Allsopp's East India and strong Burton ales. Foreigners visiting England are particularly requested to ask for these favourite Ales. The Pale Ales have been long consumed in the East Indies and all hot climates for their highly wholesome and antibilious properties. The strong Burton ales (as originally brewed by Wilson and Allsopp) have been celebrated throughout Russia, Prussia, and Germany. The [company's] agents are empowered to give letters of introduction to all respectable Foreigners who may desire to visit the Brewery at Burton-on-Trent.

In 1853, the firm opened a depot in London in which year an 18-gallon cask of Allsopp's Strong (the Old Burton) Ale cost 45s, compared to 30s for pale ale and 33s for mild ale. In 1893, Samuel Allsopp & Sons received the highest awards at Chicago for their India pale ale, their stout and their strong ale. Well into the 19th century, Bass had six different versions of Burton ale, ranging from 6% to 10.5% in strength. Bass No 1, labelled a barley wine, is in fact the last-remaining example of Bass's Burton ales. In 1876, Bass obtained the first two trademarks ever issued in the UK for its red triangle and red diamond, the latter having been used for Burton ales since the 1850s. Bass issued several limited bottlings of Bass No 1 Burton Ale to celebrate special occasions, starting with Ratcliff Ale in 1869 and continuing with King's Ale to mark the visit of Edward VII, a friend of Michael Bass, 1st Baron Burton, in February 1902 and Prince's Ale in 1929 when the mash was started by the then Prince of Wales, later Edward VIII. Bass No. 1 was brewed almost continuously (with a 10-year break from 1944 to 1954) until its discontinuation in 1995, "its demise pretty much marking the end of barley wine production on any real scale the UK".

Although the Burton brewers were the first brewers of Burton ale, and it remained a Burton speciality (many old pub mirrors from companies such as Bass and Allsopp advertise 'pale and Burton ales'), other brewers soon made their own versions, just as they did with IPA. Burton ale was brewed from Newcastle upon Tyne to Dorchester. There was also a Scottish version, Edinburgh Ale, again dark and sweet. Burton ale appeared in school textbooks such as Thomas Carpenter's The young scholar's manual of elementary arithmetic of 1842: Q - What are 56 hogsheads, 2 firkins and 6 gallons of Burton ale worth at £4.11.8 per hhd? Ans - £258.14.0½ [1hhd = 54 gallons, 1 firkin = 9 gallons, £1 = 20s = 240d]. In the 1880s, it was noted that:

The limitation and classification of ale and beer according to their strength, was maintained down to quite recent times because of the duties laid upon them, but on the repeal of those duties ales of every strength, kind and description were, and have since been, extensively manufactured. Every want, whim, and fancy of the ale-drinker may now be gratified. There is old Scotch or old Burton for the lover of strong beer, porter for the labouring classes, stout for the weakly, and last, but far from least, that splendid liquid, pale ale, which, when bottled, vies with champagne in its excellence and delicacy of flavour, and beats it altogether out of the field when we take into consideration its sustaining and restorative powers.

In the same decade one brewer advertised an 'Anti-Burton', a non-intoxicating mild ale. Until the mid-20th century the main types of draught beer served in English pubs remained mild ale, bitter and strong Burton ale, with Burton ale continuing to command a premium. In 1955, an American magazine explained to its readers that "It's the draught beers that are tricky. There are three main types: bitter beer, very strong and light colored; mild ale, sweeter and darker, and cheaper: and Burton or 'old', very dark, on the sweet side, and generally strong." The American brewery Ballantine's brewed a Burton ale to give to distributors and VIPs, including the White House. The expression "Gone for a Burton", coined by airmen during World War II as a euphemism for missing in action (crashed 'in the drink'), may mean someone who had gone to the pub for a beer.

At least eight London brewers were still making a Burton in the mid 1950s, and Courage at the Horsleydown brewery would send out showcards to its pubs saying "Courage Burton is now on sale for the winter season". Barclay Perkins produced a draught Winter brew, "a dark beer of medium bitter taste with a mellowing sweetness", and bottled No 1 Southwarke Ale, "dark bitter sweet, of deceptive strength … rather similar in style to a Younger's No 3 Scotch Ale". In Younger's London pubs in the 1950s, No. 3 took the slot occupied by Burton in local brewers' boozers. In many ways, it was quite close to a London-brewed Burton, though with a lower level of hopping. However, the fall in popularity of darker ales in the 1960s meant that Burton ale rapidly almost disappeared.

== Modern examples and revival of Burton ale ==
Young's Winter Warmer (Young's Burton until 1971) is a ruby-brown classic of the sort of ales that developed from those brewed in Burton upon Trent before that town became best known for heavily hopped pale ales and IPAs: well-rounded, mellow, old-oak dark, 1055 OG, but only five per cent ABV, and with a brown, fruity sugar tang (from the 'YSM', Young's special, proprietorial mixture of brewing sugars that go into the copper along with the wort) offset by a hint of bitter undercurrent.... Once almost every London brewery made beers like this for winter consumption, and large numbers of other brewers around the country did so too, on draught and in bottle. This was a beer with its roots in the lightly hopped ales of the 18th century and earlier, where malt flavours and strength were the qualities brewers and drinkers sought, not hoppiness. Marston's Brewery's Owd Rodger Strong Ale is another surviving beer that was formerly sold as a Burton ale.

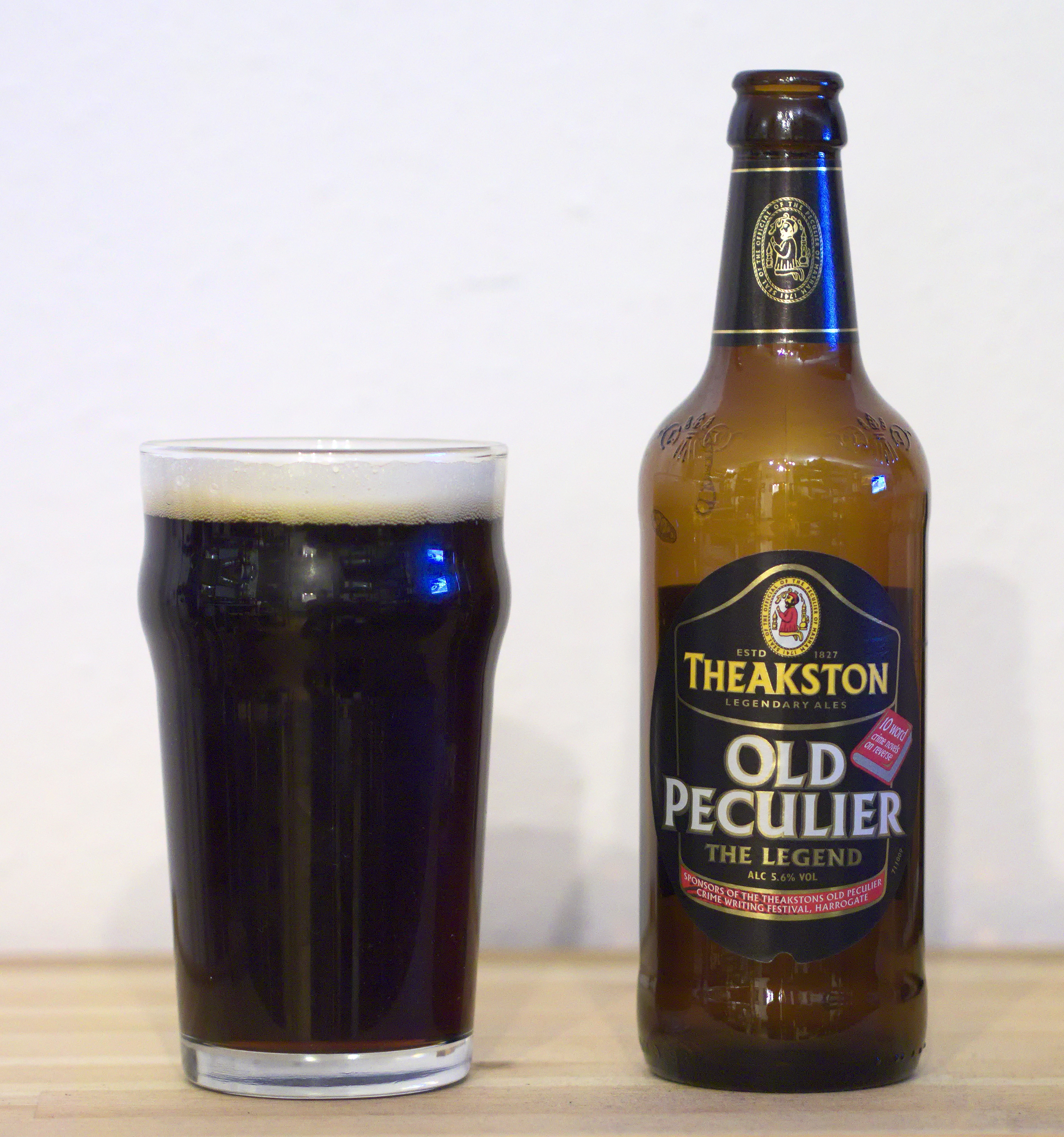
Theakston's Old Peculier

Fuller Smith and Turner replaced its Burton ale with a strong bitter, ESB, in 1969, but Fuller's ESB retains something of its Burton ale heritage and Fuller's 1845 Ale is based on a Burton ale recipe. Fuller's has also recreated two Old Burton recipes in its Past Masters' series, a 1905 Old London Ale and a 1931 Old Burton Extra (OBE). Fuller's OBE has been described by Des de Moor as "a relatively strong version of the style at 7.2%, made from pale and crystal barley malts boosted by maize and brewing syrup. The hops are a traditional combination of English Fuggles and Goldings used both in the copper and to dry hop the beer. The result is a rich deep Burgundy brown with a thick yellow beige head. There's sultana and chocolate on a rich, smooth, malty and slightly spicy aroma with honey, black grape and a subtle hint of violet. A thick, cakey and very fruity palate dries rapidly, revealing roasted notes over a treacle base with spicy orange around the edges. A charred dry finish has an almost iron-like quality, with more chocolate, cake and spice."

Truman's Brewery has recreated a 1916 No 1 Burton Barley Wine. Everard's formerly produced Burton ale; the company now offers a strong ruby ale called Old Original. Some strong dark mild ales such as Timothy Taylor's Ram Tam resemble Burton ale, as does Theakston's Old Peculier. Other dark ales – so not stouts or porters – of between 5.5 per cent and 7.5 per cent ABV, strongly malt forward, muted hop flavours, though with bitterness in the background, lacking the roast, chocolate and coffee flavours that stouts and porters have, with a balanced, often full and fruity sweetness, include Adnam's Tally Ho (which has hints of liquorice, too) and Broadside, and Greene King's Strong Suffolk. Ind Coope produced Draught Burton ale between 1976 and 2014, but although it was advertised as the ale that Mary Queen of Scots drank while imprisoned in Tutbury Castle, DBA was not a Burton ale at all, but a pale ale.

Whilst the emergence of golden ales has seen a shift away from dark beers in modern ale brewing, some microbreweries have recreated the stronger, darker styles of the past, and the listing sections of successive Good Beer Guides are packed with stouts, porters, barley wines and old ales. Craft brewers in the US, UK and elsewhere have brewed Burton ales, described as such, based on old recipes. Burton ales have been brewed by Foggy Noggin Brewing, Bothell, Washington, Big Choice Brewery, Brighton, Colorado, Culmination Brewing Company, Portland, Oregon (closed in February 2025), Marko Paulo brewery and its micropub, The Owl & The Pussycat, London, and the Twisted Hop Real Ale Brewery in Christchurch, New Zealand. Historic Burton Ale recipes are also available for homebrewing. Ballantine Burton was one of Fritz Maytag's inspirations in the creation of his Old Foghorn Barley Wine at the Anchor brewery, in San Francisco. and the Pabst Brewing Company recreated Ballantine Burton Ale in 2015. To mark its 25th anniversary, Brewers of South Suburbia, an Illinois not-for-profit corporation, recreated Allsopp's Arctic Ale. Pretty Things Beer & Ale Project have also recreated a 1901 Burton Ale KK.
