= Fuller, Smith & Turner =

British pub chain and former brewer

Coordinates: 51°29′14″N 0°15′02″W

Fuller, Smith & Turner PLC

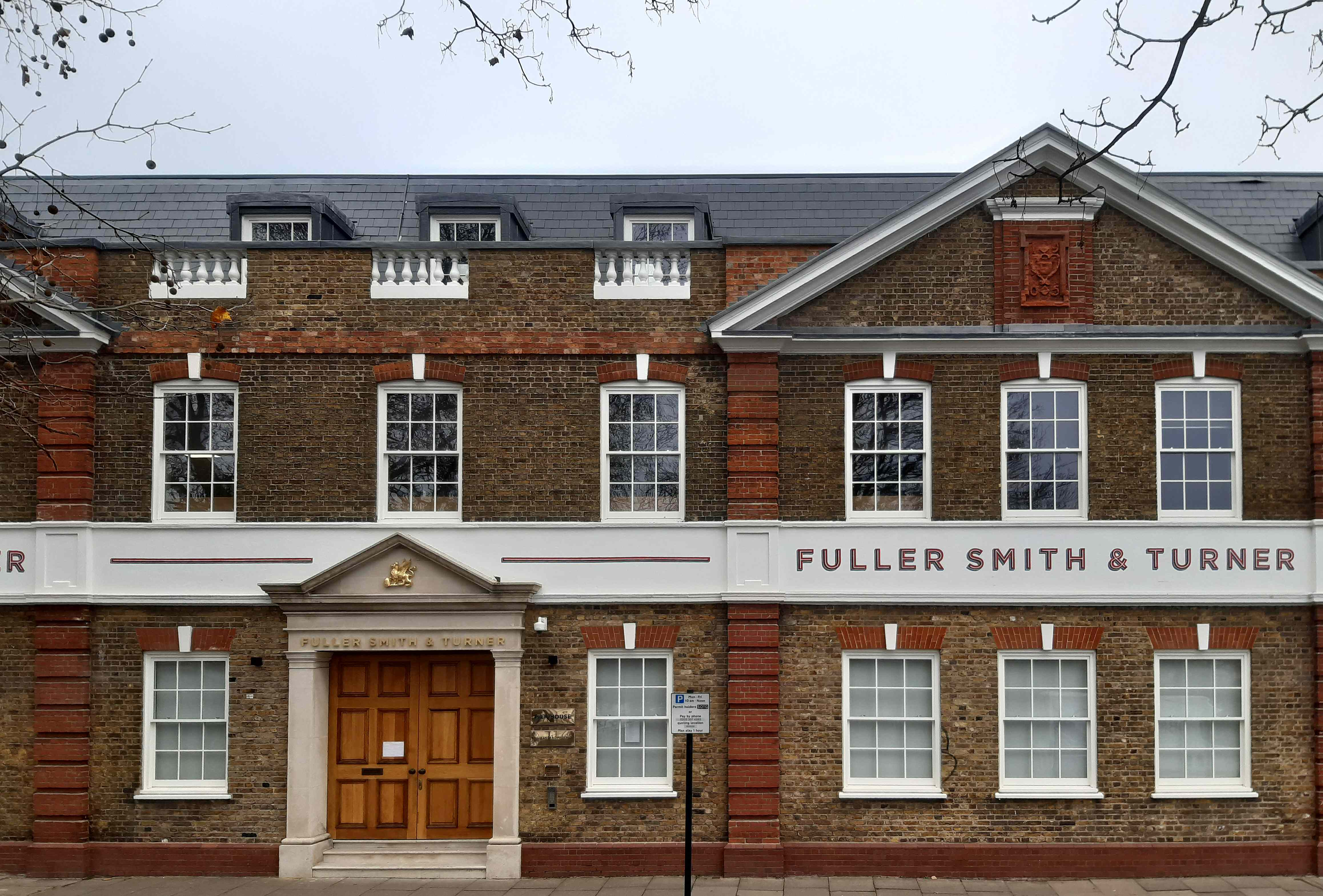
- Registered office on Strand-on-the-Green
- Company type: Public Limited Company
- Traded as: LSE: FSTA
- Industry: Public Houses
- Founded: 1845; 181 years ago
- Founders: John Bird Fuller; Henry Smith; John Turner
- Headquarters: London, United Kingdom
- Key people: Michael Turner; (Chairman); Simon Emeny; (Chief Executive)
- Revenue: ▲£397.8 million (2026)
- Operating income: ▲£45.9 million (2026)
- Net income: ▼£21.2 million (2026)
- Website: fullers.co.uk

Fuller, Smith & Turner is an English pub operating company, based in London. Its origins lie in Fuller's Brewery in Chiswick, West London. In 2019, it sold its brewing division, leaving it as a pub operator. The company's registered office is now on Strand-on-the-Green in Chiswick, London.

== History ==
Beer has been brewed on Fuller's historic Fuller's Brewery site, also known as the Griffin Brewery, in Chiswick since the seventeenth century. (Note: Fuller's History and Heritage page states "In the late 1600s".) From the original brewery in the gardens of Bedford House on Chiswick Mall, the business expanded and thrived until the early part of the nineteenth century. Money problems forced the owners, Douglas and Henry Thompson and Philip Wood, to seek a partner. John Fuller, of Neston Park, Wiltshire was approached to see if he would inject the required amount of money. In 1829 he joined the enterprise, but the partnership proved a difficult one and in 1841 Douglas Thompson fled to France and the partnership was dissolved. It became apparent that it was difficult for one man with no brewing experience to run a brewery of that size alone. In 1845 John Fuller's son, John Bird Fuller, was joined by Henry Smith from the Romford Brewery of Ind & Smith and his brother-in-law, head brewer John Turner, thereby forming Fuller, Smith & Turner.

In June 2018, Fuller, Smith & Turner acquired Bel & The Dragon, which had six country inns in the South East.

In 2019, Fuller, Smith & Turner Plc sold their brewing division (The Fuller's Griffin Brewery, as well as Cornish Orchards, Dark Star Brewing and Nectar Imports) to Asahi for £250m. Asahi stated that it would continue to brew beer at the Griffin brewery.

In October 2019, Fuller, Smith & Turner acquired Cotswold Inns & Hotels, comprising seven freehold country inns and hotels and eight freehold staff cottages in the Cotswolds, and two leasehold bars in Birmingham's city centre.

The Company previously owned The Stable, a craft cider and gourmet pizza restaurant business in England and Wales, which it sold in 2020.

== Operations ==
Fuller, Smith & Turner still own and operate over 380 pubs, inns, and hotels across the south of England, including 209 managed businesses and 175 tenanted inns. It has more than 820 boutique bedrooms in its managed estate and 44% of sites are within the M25.

== See also ==
- Fuller's pubs
