= Orr's Circle of the Sciences =

Scientific encyclopedia

Orr's Circle of the Sciences was a scientific encyclopedia of the 1850s, published in London by William Somerville Orr.

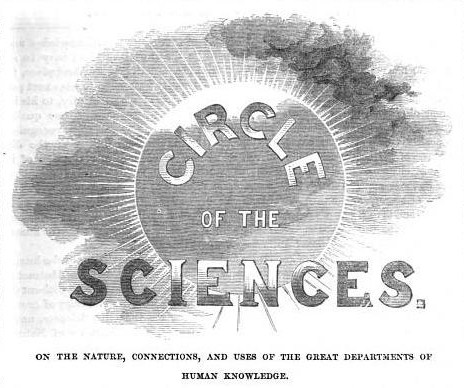
Circle of the Sciences, illustration from the introductory section of the work

== William S. Orr & Co. ==
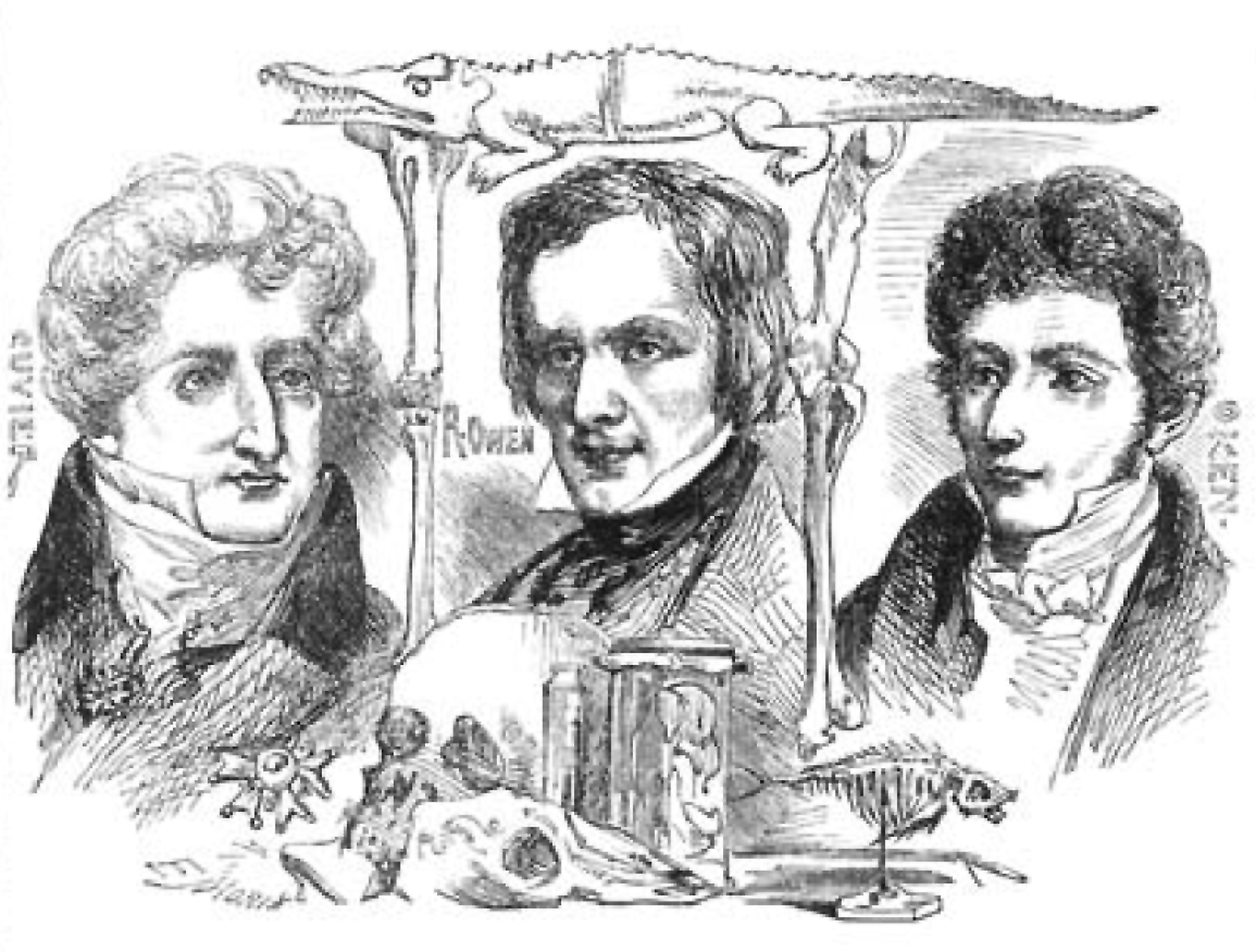
Engraving of Georges Cuvier, Richard Owen, Lorenz Oken. Originally at p. 161 of the first volume (1854) of Orr's Circle of the Sciences, it was reproduced as on this plate in Owen's The Principal Forms of the Skeleton and the Teeth (1856), which was the standalone publication of two of Owen's articles.

William S. Orr & Co. was a publisher in Paternoster Row, London. It put out the British Cyclopædia in ten volumes of the 1830s. It also was in business selling engravings (for example the Kenny Meadows illustrations to Shakespeare), and maps, such as a mid-century Cab Fare and Guide Map of London (c. 1853).

The firm was a general commercial publisher, with a specialist area of natural history, and also published periodicals. It was innovative in its use of wood engraving, in its 1838 edition of Paul et Virginie. In children's literature, it published Christoph von Schmid's Basket of Flowers in an English translation of 1848, in partnership with J. B. Müller of Stuttgart.

== William Somerville Orr ==
Orr himself was a publishers' agent from the 1830s, and was a close associate of Robert and William Chambers. He printed a London edition of Chambers's Edinburgh Journal by mid-1832. The arrangement used stereotype plates, and brought the circulation up to 50,000. By 1845 the circulation was declining from its peak, and Orr wrote to Chambers explaining that the market was changing. In 1846 Chambers terminated the arrangement with Orr.

Punch magazine, set up in 1841, brought in Orr to help with distribution to booksellers and news agents. Orr died in 1873.

== Orr's Circle of the Sciences ==
Orr's Circle of the Sciences was announced first as a part publication, a series in weekly parts, price 2d. beginning 5 January 1854. The series editor was John Stevenson Bushnan, who also wrote the introductory section of the first volume.

Volume	Year	Title	Content
1	1854	Organic Nature, vol. 1/The Principles of Physiology	On the Nature, Connection, and Uses of the Great Departments of Human Knowledge, John Stevenson Bushnan; On the Physiology of Animal and Vegetable Life, John Stevenson Bushnan; On the Principal Forms of the Skeleton, Richard Owen; On the Principal Forms and Structures of the Teeth, Richard Owen; On the Varieties of the Human Species, Robert Gordon Latham
2	1854	The Mathematical Sciences	Simple Arithmetic, Algebra and the Elements of Euclid, John Radford Young; Planes, Spherical Trigonometry, Series, Logarithms, and Mensuration, John Francis Twisden; Practical Geometry, Alexander Jardine
3	1855	A System of Natural History; Vol. 1 Botany and Invertebrated Animals	Botany, Edward Smith; Zoology, William Sweetland Dallas
4	1855	Elementary Chemistry	John Scoffern. The author explains in the introduction that the work was based on a revision of William Henry's Treatise on Chemistry.
5	1855	Geology, Mineralogy and Crystallography	Science of Physical Geography and Geology, David Thomas Ansted; Crystallography and Mineralogy, Walter Mitchell and James Tennant
6	1855	Organic Nature Vol. III/A System of Natural History; Vol. 2 Vertebrate Animals	William Sweetland Dallas; Edward Smith's name is on the title page, but for "Botany".
7	1856	Practical Astronomy, Navigation, Nautical Astronomy and Meteorology	Nautical Astronomy and Navigation, John Radford Young; Practical Astronomy, Hugh Breen; Meteorology, John Scoffern and Edward Joseph Lowe; Lowe's participation is mentioned in his Royal Society obituary.
8	1856	Practical Chemistry	Electro-deposition, George Gore; Photography, Marcus Sparling; Chemistry of Food, translation by Edward Bronner from the German of Jacob Moleschott, Lehre des Nahrungsmittel für das Volk; Adulterations of Food, John Scoffern
9	1856	Mechanical Philosophy	Mechanical Laws, Theory of Equilibrium, Mechanical Powers, Statics, Dynamics, and Hydrostatics, Walter Mitchell; John Radford Young; Mechanical Drawing, Strength of Materials, Construction of Machinery, the Steam Engine, and Textile Machines, John Imray
