= Meantime Brewery =

Brewery based in Greenwich, London, England

Coordinates: 51.489°N 0.008°E

Meantime Brewing Company
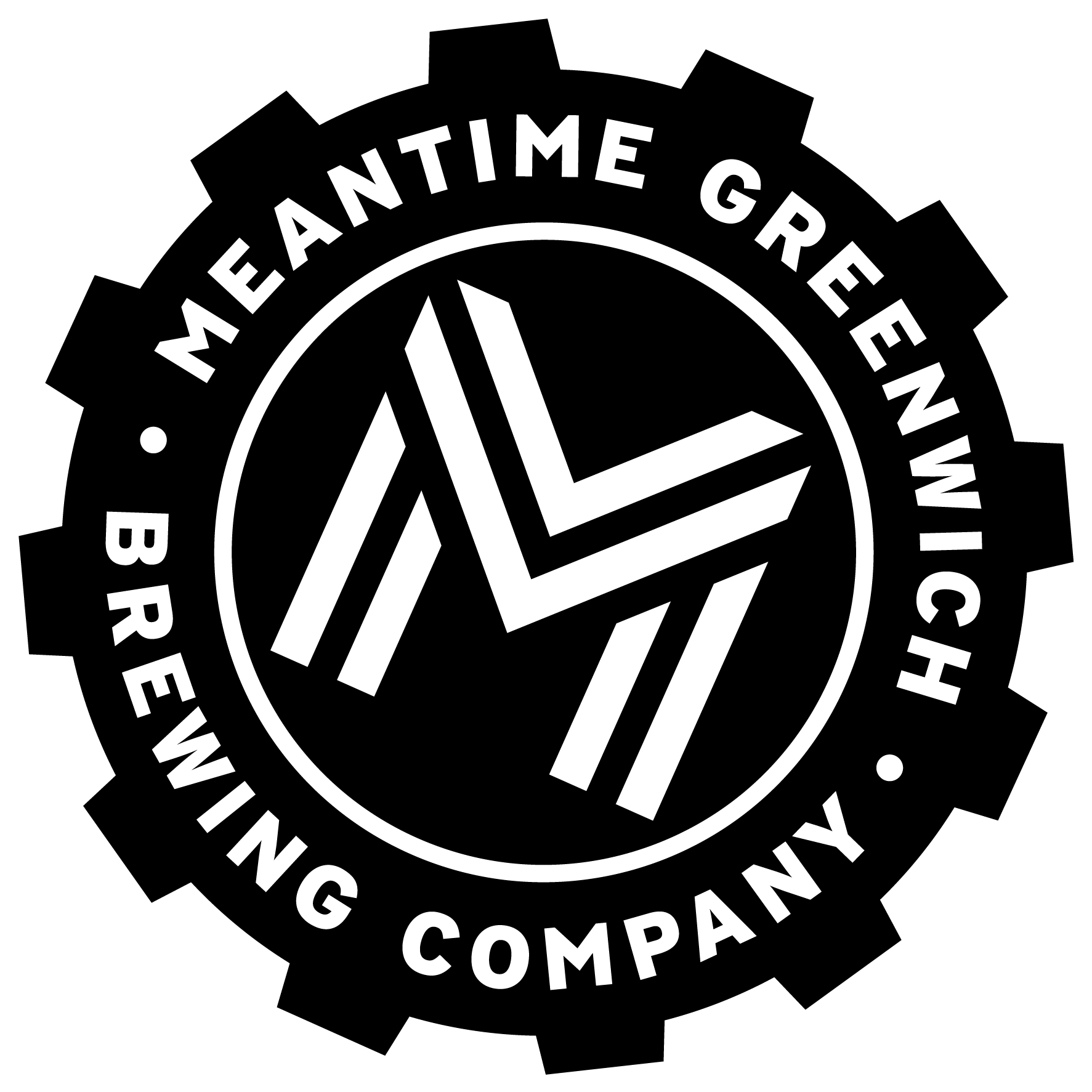

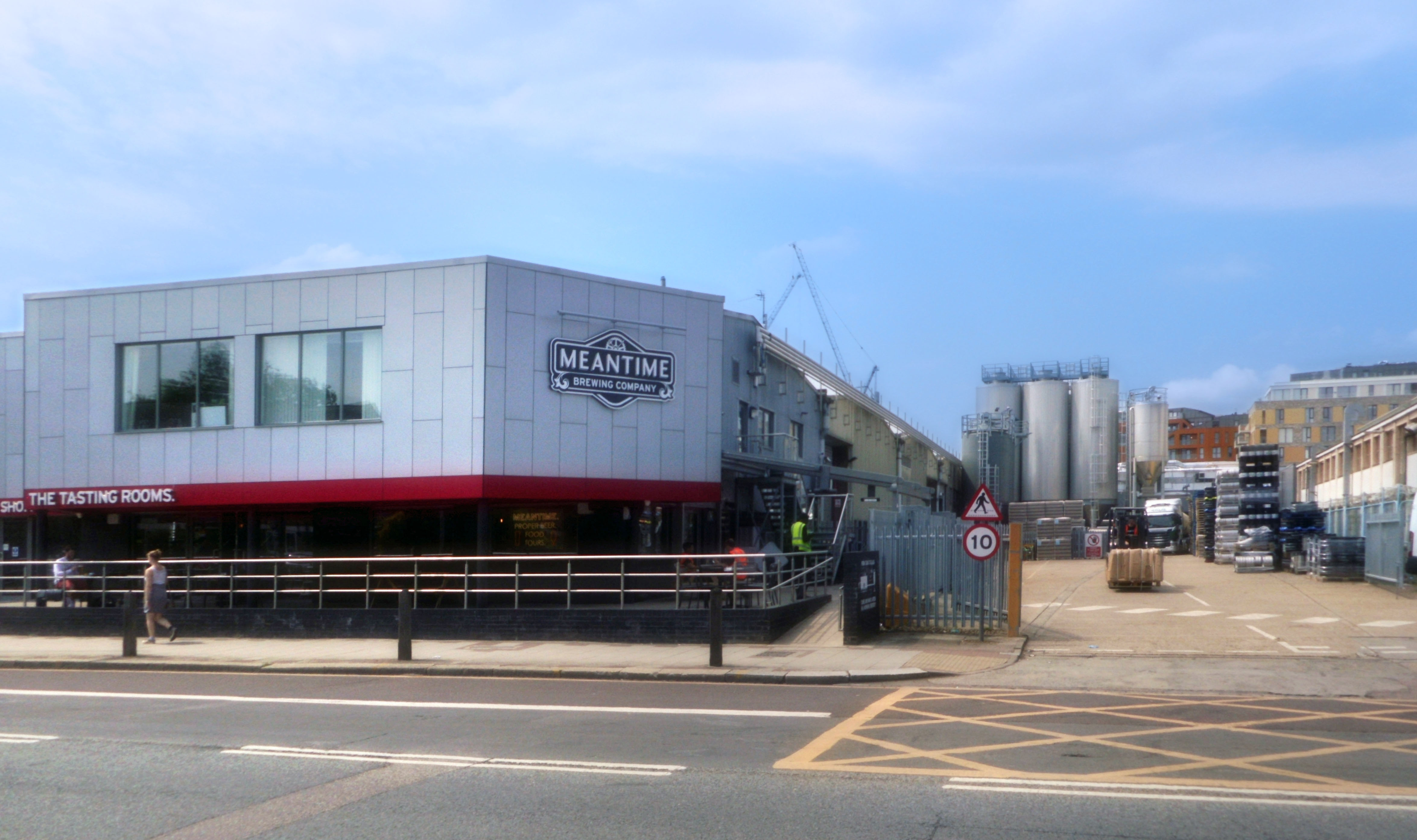
- Company type: Privately held (until 2015)
- Industry: Brewing
- Founded: 1999
- Headquarters: Greenwich, London, England
- Key people: Alastair Hook (founder)
- Products: Beer
- Owner: Asahi Breweries
- Website: meantimebrewing.com

Meantime Brewing Company was a brewery based in Greenwich, London, England, and owned by Asahi Breweries. The company was founded by Alastair Hook in 1999.

== History ==
It was founded in 1999 by Alastair Hook, who trained at Heriot-Watt University and the brewing school of the Technical University of Munich of Weihenstephan. He started the brewery in a small lock-up on an industrial estate opposite Charlton Athletic's ground, before moving to the Greenwich Brewery, 0° 2' 12" east of the Greenwich Meridian, and then to a site on nearby Blackwall Lane in 2010. The brewery, including Rolec brewhouse, cost £7M; by 2013 they were producing 50,000 hectolitres but a growth rate of 60% per year meant that they expected to reach their capacity of 120,000 hectolitres by 2016.

In May 2015, it was announced that Meantime was being bought by SAB Miller, for an undisclosed amount.

In July 2015 Hook was named Brewer of the Year by the All-Party Parliamentary Beer Group at its annual awards dinner. In the same year The Beer Academy awarded Rod Jones, Meantime's beer sommelier and brewer, the Beer Sommelier of the Year title. This was also the year that production of Thomas Hardy's Ale began at Meantime.

In August 2015, Meantime stated that production of their London Lager had, on occasion, been outsourced to Grolsch (another SAB Miller brand) in the Netherlands to meet demand, but that the Dutch beer made up no more than 10% of any bottle. Meantime confirmed that the use of Dutch beer would no longer be necessary after additional investments at the brewery, with the aim of keeping production entirely in London.

As part of the agreements made with regulators before Anheuser-Busch InBev was allowed to acquire SABMiller in 2016, Meantime was sold to Asahi Breweries in October 2016.

In January 2019 Asahi also bought the brewing division of Fuller's Brewery and its subsidiary Dark Star. Meantime started production of Dark Star's portfolio of beers after Asahi closed the Sussex brewery in December 2022.

In March 2024 Asahi announced the closure of the Meantime brewery site in Greenwich. Production of Meantime and Dark Star beers was transferred to the Asahi-owned Fuller's Brewery site in Chiswick.

== Beers ==
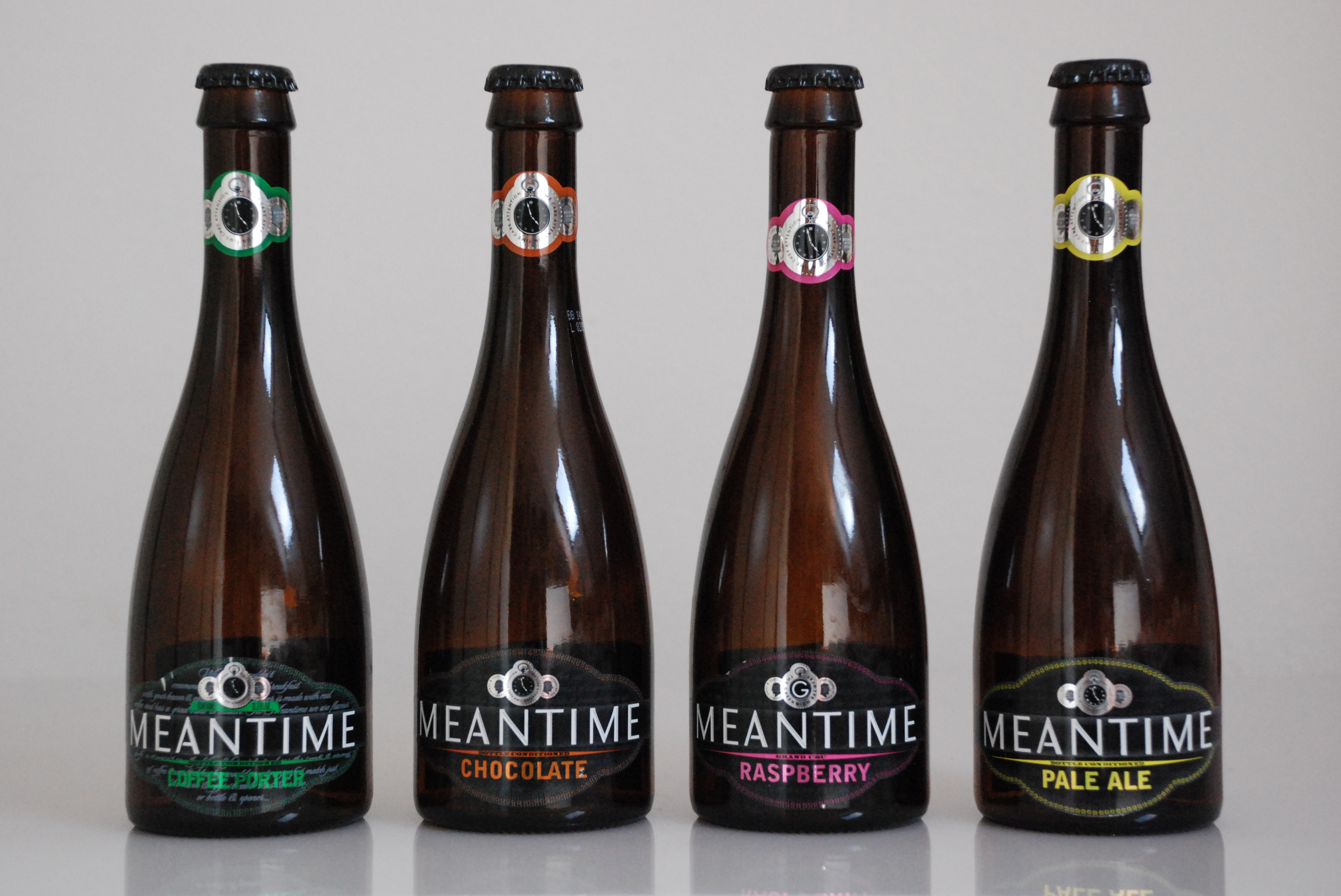
Meantime beer bottles, from left: Coffee Porter, Chocolate, Raspberry, Pale Ale

Meantime brews a range of twelve regularly available beers which focuses on traditional British and European styles such as Lager, Pale Ale, Porter and India Pale Ale. In addition, it also produces an annual range of limited edition seasonal ales, which vary each year.

== Outlets ==
From 2001, Meantime owned and operated the Greenwich Union public house on Royal Hill, Greenwich. This was formally closed following the first COVID-19 lockdown in 2020 and sold to Young's to become an extension of an existing Young's pub next door, the Richard I.

In 2010, the same year the main production site moved to Blackwall Lane, Meantime opened the Old Brewery Greenwich brewpub in the original 1836 brewhouse of the Old Royal Naval College, part of the Maritime Greenwich World Heritage Site. Following the acquisition by Asahi, this was sold to Young's in 2016 and brewing activities ceased.

Between August 2014 and the end of 2017, Meantime operated outdoor bar the Beer Box near The O2 on the Greenwich Peninsula.

In early 2015, Meantime opened a taproom, shop and visitor centre at the main production site. This was closed by April 2024 in preparation for the brewery closure.
