= Organic Honey Dew =

UK's organic beer

- Type: Organic golden ale
- Manufacturer: Fuller's Brewery
- Country of origin: UK
- Introduced: 2000
- Alcohol by volume: 5%
- Colour: Warm gold
- Flavour: Zesty citrus notes softened by honey flavours
- Related products: ESB, Chiswick Bitter, London Pride
- Website: Official website

Fuller's Organic Honey Dew is the UK's best-selling organic beer. It is made from 100% organic ingredients, and is approved by the Soil Association. The beer is brewed at Fuller's Griffin Brewery in Chiswick, London.

== History ==
Fuller's launched Organic Honey Dew in 2000, to capitalise on a growing trend in Britain for organic produce. In 2008, it was voted World's Best Honey Beer at the World Beer Awards.

== Characteristics ==
A light golden beer with a zesty edge and a hint of honey sweetness, Organic Honey Dew is a naturally palatable brew that finds popularity among lager drinkers as well as ale fans. It's a popular misconception that only the honey is organic, but in fact the beer is brewed with entirely organic ingredients. It uses organic honey imported from Brazil, plus organic English malt and hops including the First Gold hop variety.

Organic Honey Dew is available in pasteurised bottles and kegs all year round, with a strength of 5% ABV. It is the United Kingdom's best selling organic beer, and was listed by The Independent as one of the ten best organic beers on the market in 2005; at that time it was also equal cheapest of the beers listed in that category. Adam Tierney-Jones included it in his book 1001 Beers You Must Try Before You Die, commenting that it was one of Britain's first in two categories, organic beers and honey beers. Tierney-Jones wrote that it was amusing to see men drinking this beer as with its "delicately sweet, golden" nature it could be thought of as a beer for women. He called it "surprisingly versatile" with food, recommending it with creamy pasta, fish, and mushrooms.
