= Gone for a Burton =

British colloquial expression

Gone for a Burton is a British English expression meaning to be missing or to die. The term was popularised by the RAF around the time of World War II. It migrated to the USA quickly and in June 1943 a story titled "Husky Goes Down for a Burton" appeared in Boys' Life, the magazine of the Boy Scouts of America. The etymology, though popularly associated with Burton ale, is disputed.
