= Fuller's ESB =

Brand of beer brewed in London

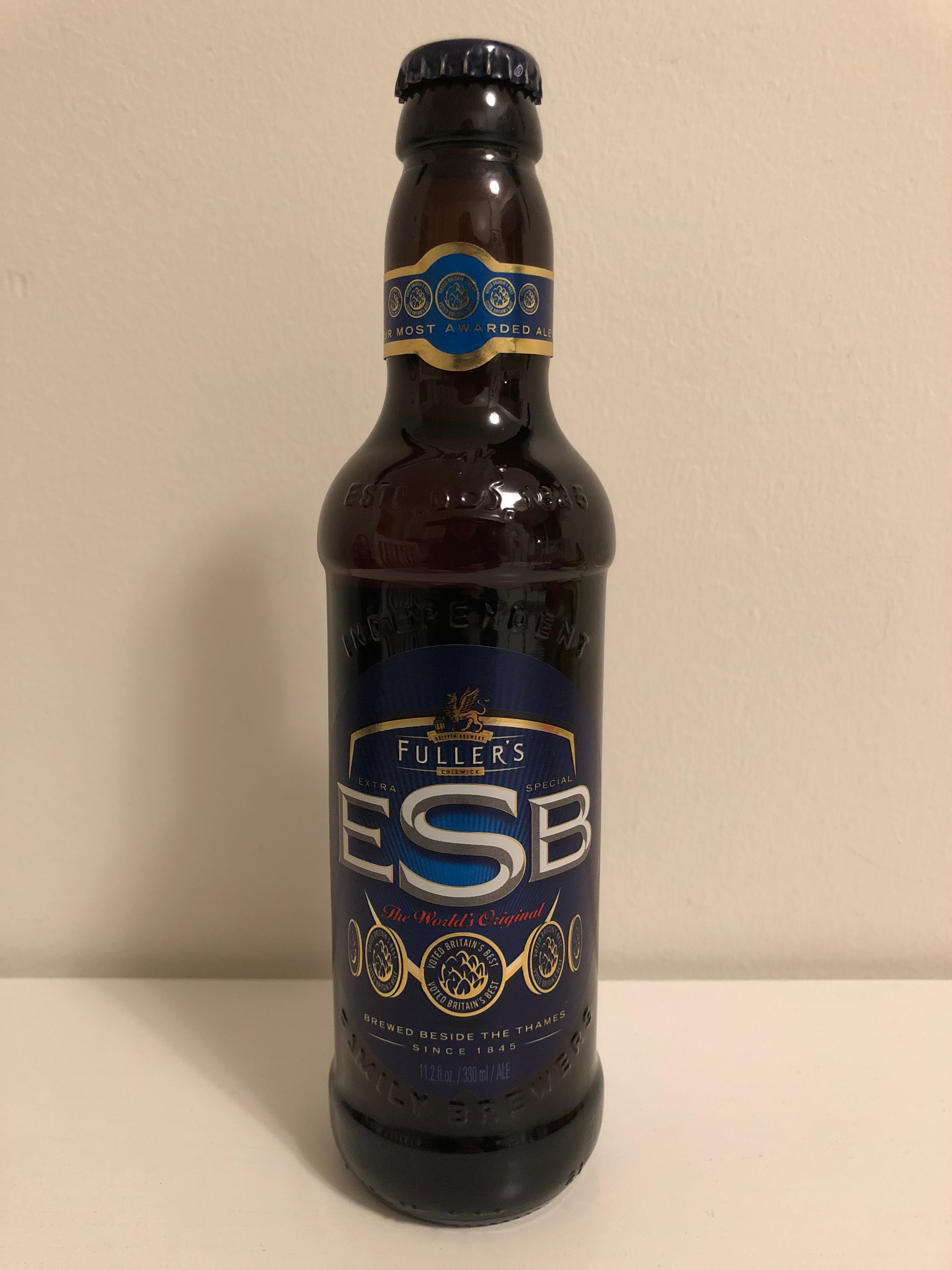
- The Champion Ale
- Type: Beer
- Manufacturer: Fuller's Brewery
- Origin: England
- Introduced: 1971
- Alcohol by volume: 5.5% cask, 5.9% bottle
- Colour: Mahogany, horse chestnut appearance
- Flavour: grassy, peppery notes with intense citrus fruit characters
- Related products: London Pride, Chiswick Bitter, Honey Dew
- Website: Official website

Fuller's ESB (Extra Special Bitter) is a beer brewed by Fuller's at the Griffin Brewery in Chiswick, London. It has twice been named World Champion Beer, and has won CAMRA's Champion Beer of Britain Award on three occasions.

== History ==
Fuller's ESB was first brewed in 1971 as a replacement for a beer called Old Burton Extra. At this time, breweries commonly produced both an "ordinary" bitter and a "special". Fuller's already had a "special", London Pride, and chose to add a third, extra special bitter, ESB.

== Characteristics ==
ESB is a strong, full-bodied, mahogany-coloured ale. It is brewed with Pale Ale and Crystal malts, bringing both biscuit flavours and soft malt toffee notes to the fore. It is sold in both 5.5% cask conditioned form as well as pasteurised at 5.9% in bottles and kegs.

== Awards ==
Fuller's ESB was named CAMRA's Champion Beer of Britain in 1978, 1981 and 1985. It has also been named CAMRA’s Strong Ale of the Year seven times – more than any other beer. ESB has also won the World Champion Beer award on two occasions, giving the brew the nickname "The Champion Ale".

At the World Beer Awards 2011, ESB was awarded "Europe's Best Pale Ale - Strong".
