= Robert Gordon Latham =

British ethnologist and philologist (1812–1888)

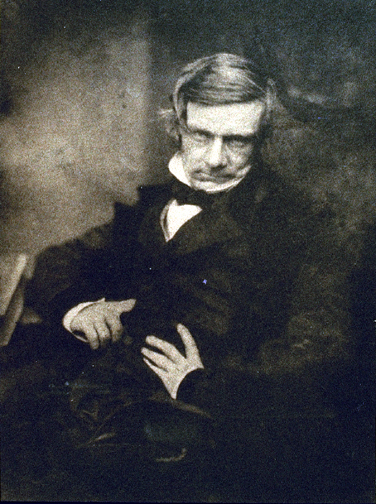
Robert Gordon Latham, c. 1845 by Hill & Adamson

Robert Gordon Latham FRS (24 March 1812 – 9 March 1888) was an English ethnologist and philologist.

== Early life ==
The eldest son of Thomas Latham, vicar of Billingborough, Lincolnshire, he was born there on 24 March 1812. He entered Eton College in 1819, and in 1829 went on to King's College, Cambridge, where he graduated B.A. in 1832, and was soon afterwards elected a Fellow.

== Philologist ==
Latham studied philology for a year on the continent, near Hamburg, then in Copenhagen with Rasmus Christian Rask, and finally in Christiania (now Oslo). In Norway he knew Ludvig Kristensen Daa and Henrik Wergeland; he wrote about the country in Norway and the Norwegians (1840).

In 1839 he was elected professor of English language and literature in University College, London. Here he associated with Thomas Hewitt Key and Henry Malden, linguists working in the tradition of Friedrich August Rosen. Together they developed the Philological Society, expanding it from a student group to a broad base among London philologists, publishing its own Proceedings.

== Medical career ==
Latham decided to enter the medical profession, and in 1842 became a licentiate of the Royal College of Physicians; he subsequently obtained the degree of M.D. at the University of London. He became lecturer on forensic medicine and materia medica at the Middlesex Hospital, and in 1844 he was elected assistant-physician there.

== Ethnologist ==
Latham was more interested, however, in ethnology and philology. In 1849 he abandoned medicine and resigned his appointments. In 1852 he was given the direction of the ethnological department of The Crystal Palace, as it moved to Sydenham.

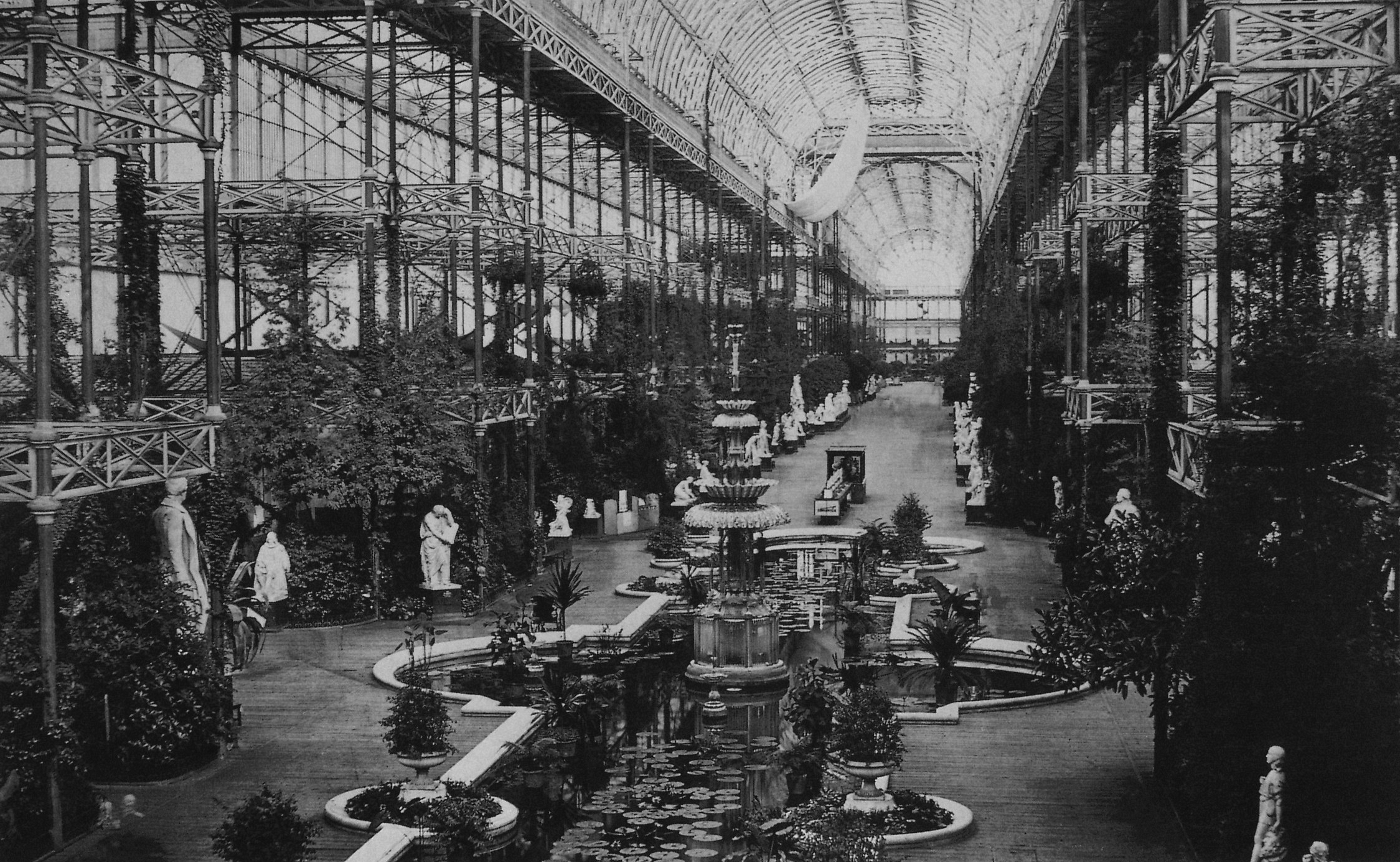
The Crystal Palace at Sydenham, interior view. Latham was curator of a "court of natural history", an ethnological display, set up as the Palace moved from its original location and content (the Great Exhibition of 1851), to a permanent site.

Latham was a follower of James Cowles Prichard, and like Prichard took ethnology to be, in the main, the part of historical philology that traced the origin of races through the genealogical relationships of languages. He frequently lectured in this area. As a baseline he used the three-race theory of Georges Cuvier. Along with Prichard, however, Latham criticised Cuvier's use of the "Caucasian race" concept; and he preferred to avoid the term "race", referring instead to "varieties of man", as a reaction to the rise of polygenist theory around 1850. However, he followed in 1854 by writing The Native Races of the Russian Empire.

Latham moved on, though, from Prichard's assumption (now sometimes called "languages and nations"), that the historical relationships of languages matched perfectly the relationships of the groups speaking them. In 1862 he made a prominent protest against the central Asian theory of the origin of the Aryan race. He supported views which were later advocated by Theodor Benfey, Parker, Isaac Taylor, and others. The origin of the Indo-European languages was, in Latham's view, in Lithuania; and he strongly attacked Max Müller, proponent of the "Aryan theory", at the same time as did John Crawfurd arguing from rather different premises. The controversy over Latham's views on Indo-European languages following his Comparative Philology (1862) did permanent damage to his scholarly reputation.

== Later life ==
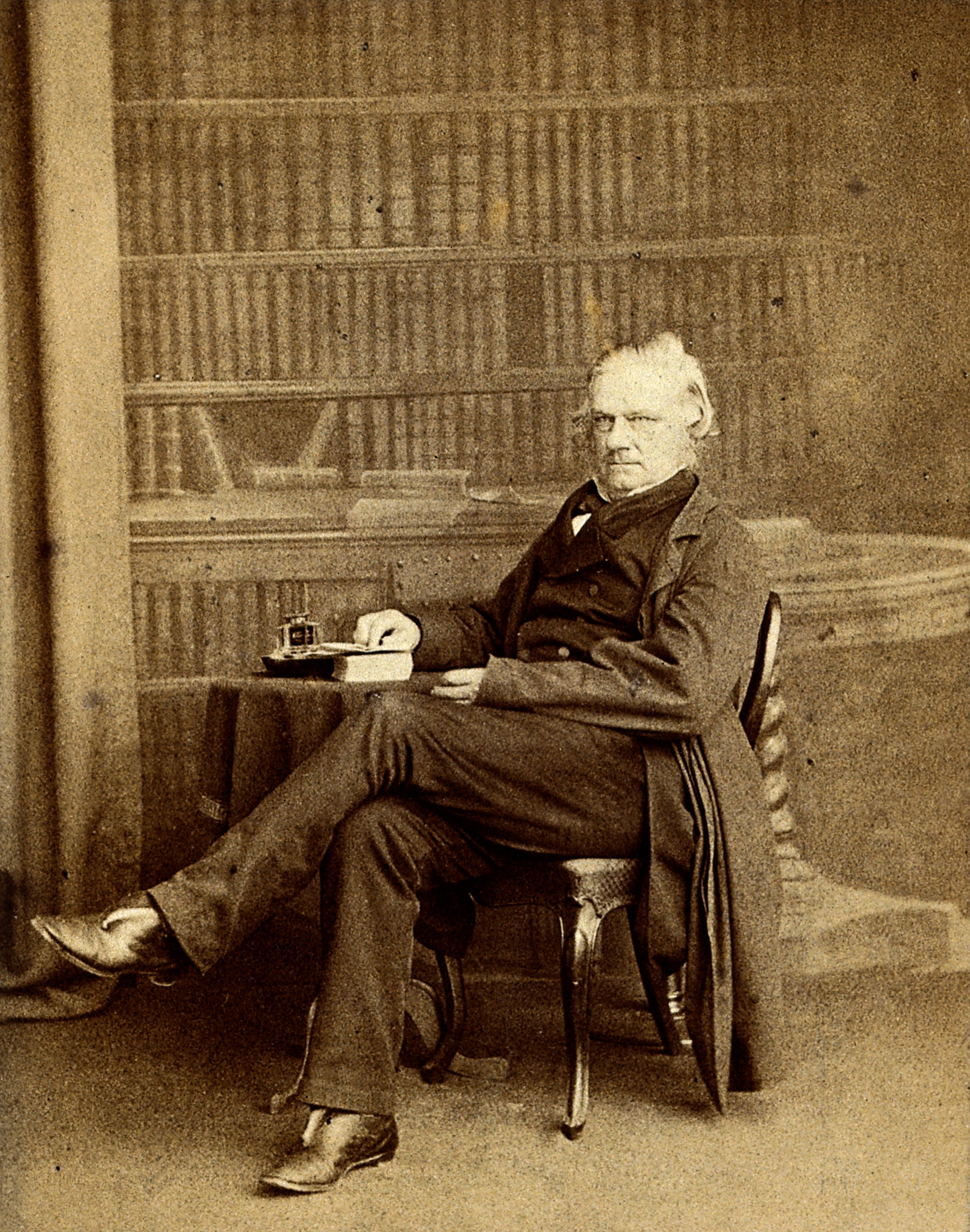
Robert Gordon Latham, photograph published 1863.

Gordon Hake wrote in his memoirs of Latham's habit of pleading poverty and asking for money. In 1863 Latham obtained a civil list pension. In later life he was afflicted with aphasia, and died at Putney on 9 March 1888.

== Works ==
In 1841 Latham produced a well-known text-book, The English Language. He devoted himself to a thorough revision of Samuel Johnson's Dictionary of the English Language, which he completed in 1870. He subsequently spent much time on a Dissertation on the Hamlet of Saxo Grammaticus and of Shakespeare. His works on the English language passed through many editions, and were regarded as authoritative till they were superseded by those of Richard Morris and Walter William Skeat.

Other works included:

- An Elementary English Grammar for the Use of Schools, 1843
- The Natural History of the Varieties of Mankind, 1850
- The Ethnology of the British Colonies and Dependencies, 1851
- Man and his Migrations, 1851
- The Ethnology of Europe, 1852
- The Native Races of the Russian Empire, 1854
- On the Varieties of the Human Species, in Orr's Circle of the Sciences vol. 1, 1854
- Logic in its Application to Language, 1856
- Descriptive Ethnology, 1858 Volume I Volume II
- Ethnology of India, 1859
- Opuscula: Essays Chiefly Philological and Ethnographical, 1860
- A Smaller English Grammar for the Use of Schools, 1861
- (with David Thomas Ansted) The Channel Islands, 1862; 2nd edition (1865).
- Elements of Comparative Philology, 1862
