= London Pride (beer) =

British beer brand

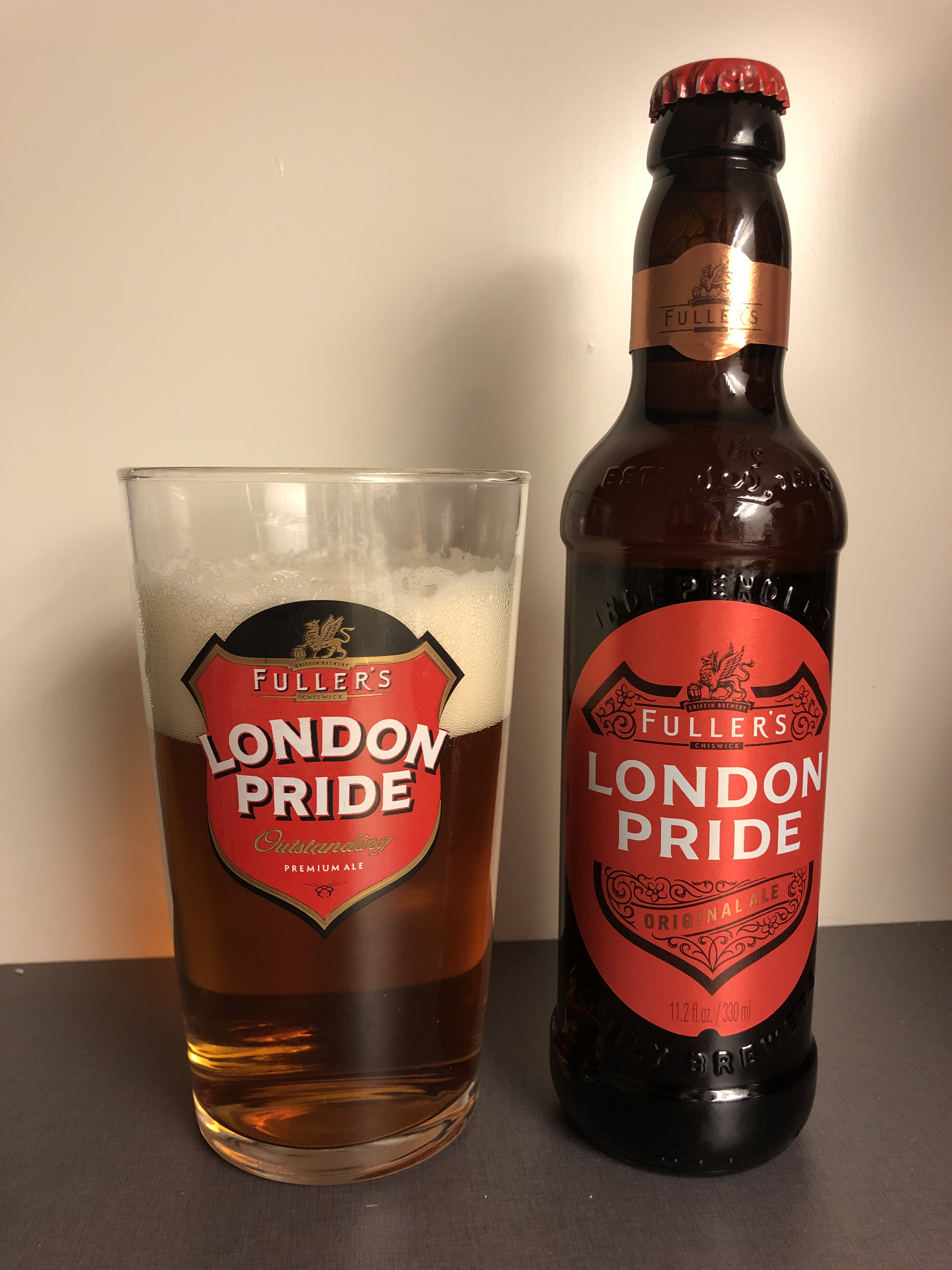
- Type: Beer
- Manufacturer: Fuller's Brewery
- Country of origin: UK
- Introduced: 1959
- Alcohol by volume: 4.1% (cask and keg); 4.7% (bottled)
- Colour: Deep golden amber
- Flavour: Malty sweet, with a clean bitterness. Toffee, biscuit notes with a zesty character.
- Related products: Fuller's ESB, Chiswick Bitter, Honey Dew, Frontier
- Website: https://fullers.co.uk

London Pride is the flagship beer of Fuller's Brewery. It is sold both cask-conditioned and bottled. It has been brewed at the Griffin Brewery since 1958.

== History ==
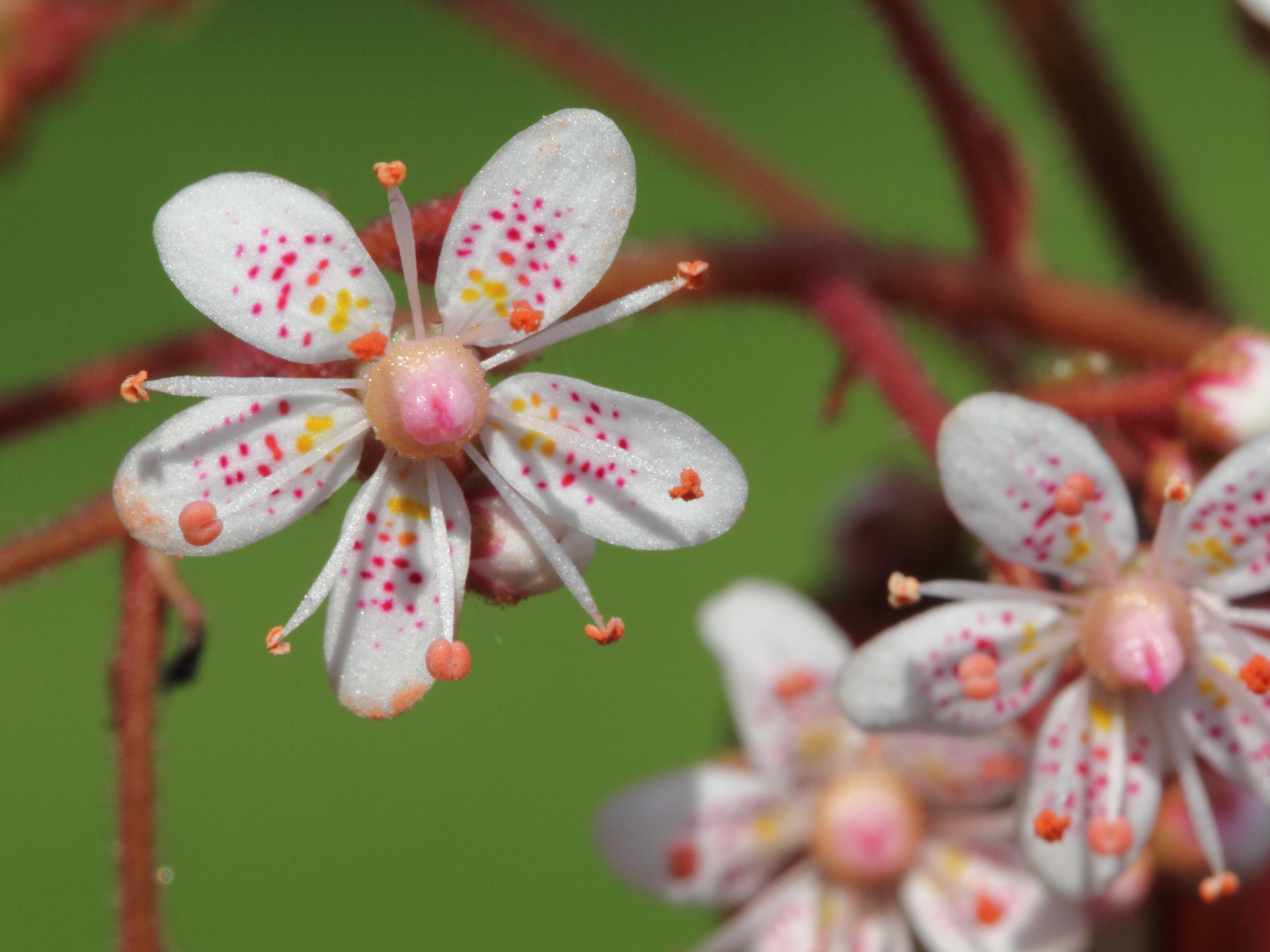
Saxifraga × urbium, known as "London Pride", a bombsite flower seen during the London Blitz, gave its name to the beer.

London Pride takes its name from a common name for the Saxifraga × urbium flower, in use by the 19th century. The flower provided shoots of recovery on the bombed sites left by the London Blitz of the early 1940s, and as such held symbolism for Londoners, celebrated in "London Pride", a patriotic song written in 1941 by Noël Coward.

== Awards ==
London Pride was named Champion Beer of Britain in the Best Bitter Class at the CAMRA awards in 1979 and 1995. It was named Supreme Champion at the 2000 International Beer and Cider competition.

== Characteristics ==
London Pride is known for its balance of malt and hops, giving rise to a well-rounded flavour. It is brewed with Pale malt, plus Target, Challenger and Northdown hops. In the UK, draught London Pride is brewed to 4.1% ABV (cask and keg), while in bottles and cans it has a strength of 4.7% ABV. Internationally, a keg version is often available at 4.7% ABV.

In February 2017, Fuller's launched London Pride Unfiltered - an unfiltered variant - which is brewed using the original recipe, then dry hopped with Target hops and centrifuged but not filtered or pasteurised.

== Marketing ==
The London Pride brand has been promoted with the slogan "Made of London". The brand has a social media presence across Facebook, Twitter and Instagram, with social-first campaigns such as "Tweet At 12", "Empty Pint" and "Drop Of Pride". London Pride sponsors initiatives and events including an annual 10 kilometre walk in aid of Cancer Research UK. Since 2007, it has been the official beer of the London Marathon. In 2018, Fullers London Pride became the official beer of Pride in London.

London Pride partnered with the weatherman Michael Fish to offer Twitter followers a free pint each time it rained in London in February 2017. The campaign was called "#Whenitrainsitpours".

London Pride also has a significant sponsorship presence in Rugby union in England. The beer has been the 'proud sponsors of Premiership rugby' since a deal was made between the two entities in 2021. They have also sponsored the British & Irish lions since 2021 and have sponsorship boards at many premiership rugby stadiums.
