= Dark Star Brewing Company =

Brewery in Partridge Green, Sussex, England

Coordinates: 50.9582°N 0.3041°W

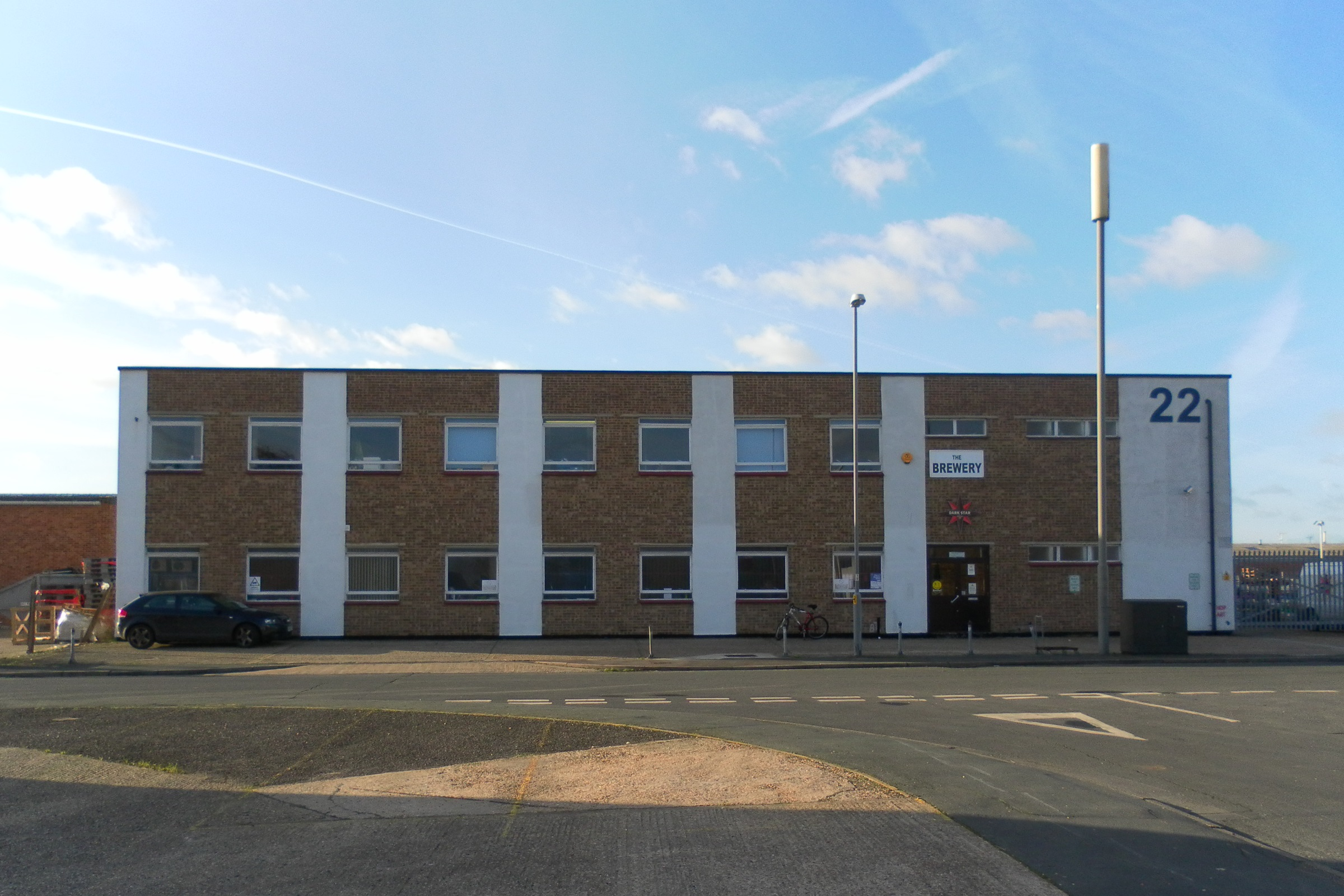
- The Dark Star brewery
- Industry: Brewing
- Founded: 1994
- Founder: Rob Jones
- Headquarters: Partridge Green, England
- Products: Craft beer
- Parent: Asahi Breweries
- Website: www.darkstarbrewing.co.uk

Dark Star was a brewery in Partridge Green, Sussex, England.

== History ==
Dark Star Brewery was established in 1994, brewing in the cellar of the Evening Star public house in Brighton. The beer Dark Star was originally made by Pitfield Brewery in north London before its brewer, Rob Jones, moved to the Evening Star. In 2001, the company moved production to Ansty, West Sussex, before moving again to Partridge Green in 2010. The new brewery had a brew length of 45 barrels and an annual capacity of 20,000 barrels.

In February 2018, Dark Star was acquired by London-based brewer Fuller Smith & Turner, with James Cuthbertson staying on as its managing director. In August 2018, the brewery confirmed that some of its flagship "Hophead" pale ale was being produced by Fuller's in London.

In January 2019, Fuller Smith & Turner announced plans to sell its entire drinks business, including The Dark Star Brewing Company, to Japanese firm Asahi Breweries.

In November 2022, Asahi Breweries announced that it would close the Dark Star Brewery in Partridge Green, with the entire Dark Star portfolio moving to its Meantime Brewery in Greenwich, London.

In March 2024, Asahi announced the closure of Meantime Brewery. Asahi moved production of Dark Star beers to the Fuller's Brewery in Chiswick.
