= John Stevenson Bushnan =

English physician and medical writer

John Stevenson Bushnan (1807–1884) was an English medical doctor and medical writer.

== Life ==
He was born in London, the eldest child of Joseph Bushnan, an official of the City of London, and his wife, Mary Newton, née Osborn. He passed at Edinburgh in 1830 the examinations of the Royal College of Surgeons and of the Royal College of Physicians.

Marrying, Bushnan lived in Dumfries in the Scottish Borders; and did some work for the Society for the Diffusion of Useful Knowledge. He then had a period studying at Heidelberg, where he graduated M.D, in 1836. Returning to England, he went into practice at Castle Cary in Somerset.

Bushnan was then abroad, from 1841, to 1848. Eventually he settled in London, where he filled the post of editor of the Medical Times and Gazette from 1849 to 1852. Then for one year he was chief physician of the Metropolitan Free Hospital. In 1852 also he became medical superintendent at Wyke House Asylum, a post he held for five years. He then bought his way into the Laverstock House Asylum, which he owned in the period 1860 to 1867.

After a break in London, Bushnan went again into practice in Southampton, in 1871. He retired in 1882.

At the end of his life, Bushnan's sight failed, and he ended his days as a "poor brother" of the London Charterhouse, where he died on 17 February 1884, aged 76.

== Works ==
Bushnan published:

- A History of a Case of Animals in the Blood of a Boy, 1833;
- Translated from the German, Johann Friedrich Dieffenbach's Surgical Observations on the Restoration of the Nose, and an Introduction to the Study of Nature (1833);
- Philosophy of Instinct and Reason (1837);
- Ichthyology (1840) in the Naturalist's Library;
- Observations on Hydropathy, (1845);
- Cholera and its Cures (1850);
- Address to the Medical Students of London (1850);
- The Moral and Sanitary Aspects of the New Central Cattle-market (1851);
- Miss Martineau and her Master (1851), against Harriet Martineau and her Letters on the Laws of Man's Social Nature;
- Homeopathy and the Homeopaths (1852);
- Household Medicine and Surgery (1854);
- Contribution to Orr's Circle of the Sciences (1854), of which Bushnan was the series editor, as well as writing in the first volume;
- Religious Revivals (1860)
- Our Holiday at Laverstock House Asylum (1860).

In 1861-2 Bushnan wrote two reviews in the Journal of Mental Science.

== Notes ==
Attribution

This article incorporates text from a publication now in the public domain: Stephen, Leslie, ed. (1886). "Bushnan, John Stevenson". Dictionary of National Biography. Vol. 8. London: Smith, Elder & Co.
