= John Scoffern =

English surgeon and science writer

John Scoffern (1814–1882) was an English surgeon and popular science writer.

== Life ==
He was born in Dutson, Cornwall, the son of William Scoffern (1783–1854) and his wife Wilmot Crocker, was educated by the Rev. John Couch Grylls at Saltash. He then attended University College, London and Aldersgate Medical School.

Scoffern was lecturer at Aldersgate Medical School in 1840, and graduated M.B. at the University of London in 1843. He lectured also at the medical school in Charlotte Street. He went on to a prolific career in scientific and other writing.

During the Franco-Prussian War, Scoffern was a newspaper correspondent. He was in the Château de Saint-Cloud, occupied by the Prussian forces, when it was shelled by French guns in October 1870. He tended the sick and wounded in Paris, and was awarded the Iron Cross in 1871 for bravery and his medical work.
