= Cornish Orchards =

Englisu cider and juice company

Cornish Orchards Ltd
- Company type: Subsidiary
- Founded: August 19, 2003; 21 years ago in Cornwall
- Founder: Andy Atkinson
- Headquarters: London, UK
- Key people: Victoria Segebarth (Managing director); Rohan Cummings (Chief financial officer)
- Parent: Asahi Europe
- Website: https://www.cornishorchards.co.uk

Cornish Orchards is a cider and juice company based at Duloe, Cornwall.

== History ==
The company was started by Andy Atkinson in 1999 at Westnorth Manor Farm, owned by the Duchy of Cornwall. The farm has 15 acres of its own apples, mainly heritage varieties, but also buys in apples from local orchards.

In 2013 the company was sold in a multimillion-pound deal to London brewing and pubs group Fuller, Smith and Turner. Fuller's was acquired by Asahi Breweries in 2019 for £250m, although both Fuller's and Cornish Orchards continue to trade under their own names.

== Awards ==
The company has won several awards for its cider, including a gold in the Campaign for Real Ale's national cider and perry championships at Reading in 2012.
