= Fuller's Brewery =

Brewery in Chiswick, west London, England

Coordinates: 51°29′14″N 0°15′02″W

- Type: Subsidiary
- Industry: Brewing
- Founded: 1845; 181 years ago
- Founders: John Bird Fuller, Henry Smith and John Turner
- Headquarters: Asahi UK, Woking, Surrey, England
- Products: Beer
- Production output: 337,000 UK barrels (in FY2017)
- Revenue: £431.1 million (FY2019)
- Parent: Asahi Breweries
- Website: fullersbrewery.co.uk

Fuller's Brewery in Chiswick, west London, England, was the brewing division of Fuller, Smith & Turner PLC, a family-run business from its foundation in 1845 until 2019, when it was sold to the Japanese Asahi Breweries.

John Fuller's Griffin Brewery dates from 1816; in 1845, his son, John Bird Fuller, was joined by Henry Smith and John Turner.

Fuller, Smith & Turner owns and operates more than 380 pubs, inns and hotels across the south of England.

== History ==
Beer has been brewed on Fuller's historic Griffin Brewery site in Old Chiswick since the seventeenth century. (Note: Fuller's History and Heritage page states "In the late 1600s".) From the original brewery in the gardens of Bedford House on Chiswick Mall, the business expanded and thrived until the early part of the nineteenth century. Money problems forced the owners, Douglas and Henry Thompson and Philip Wood, to seek a partner. John Fuller, of Neston Park, Wiltshire was approached to see if he would inject the required amount of money. In 1829 he joined the enterprise, but the partnership proved a difficult one and in 1841 Douglas Thompson fled to France and the partnership was dissolved. It became apparent that it was difficult for one man with no brewing experience to run a brewery of that size alone. In 1845 John Fuller's son, John Bird Fuller, was joined by Henry Smith from the Romford Brewery of Ind & Smith and his brother-in-law, head brewer John Turner, thereby forming Fuller, Smith & Turner.

Reg Drury joined Fullers in 1959 at a time when cask ales were in decline, and worked there for 40 years, becoming the director of brewing. It was thought at the time that it was only possible to cask beer in open fermenters, but Drury experimented and found that it could also be made in more modern, closed conical fermenters. The switchover to conical fermenters improved consistency and allowed Drury to perfect the recipes of Fuller's beers.

In 2019 Fuller, Smith & Turner Plc sold its drinks company (The Fuller's Griffin Brewery, Cornish Orchards, Dark Star Brewery & Nectar Imports) to Asahi for £250m. This included the entirety of Fuller's beer, cider and soft drinks brewing and production, wine wholesaling, distribution, and the Griffin Brewery site. Asahi stated that it would continue to brew beer at the Griffin brewery.

== Griffin Brewery ==
The first record of the Griffin Brewery in Chiswick dates from 1816, when one of the owners of the company at the time, Douglas Thompson, acquired the name from a failed brewery (Meux & Reid) in the City of London. As well as its range of beers, the Griffin Brewery, on the A4 in Chiswick, is famous for having the oldest wisteria plant in the UK, planted in 1816.

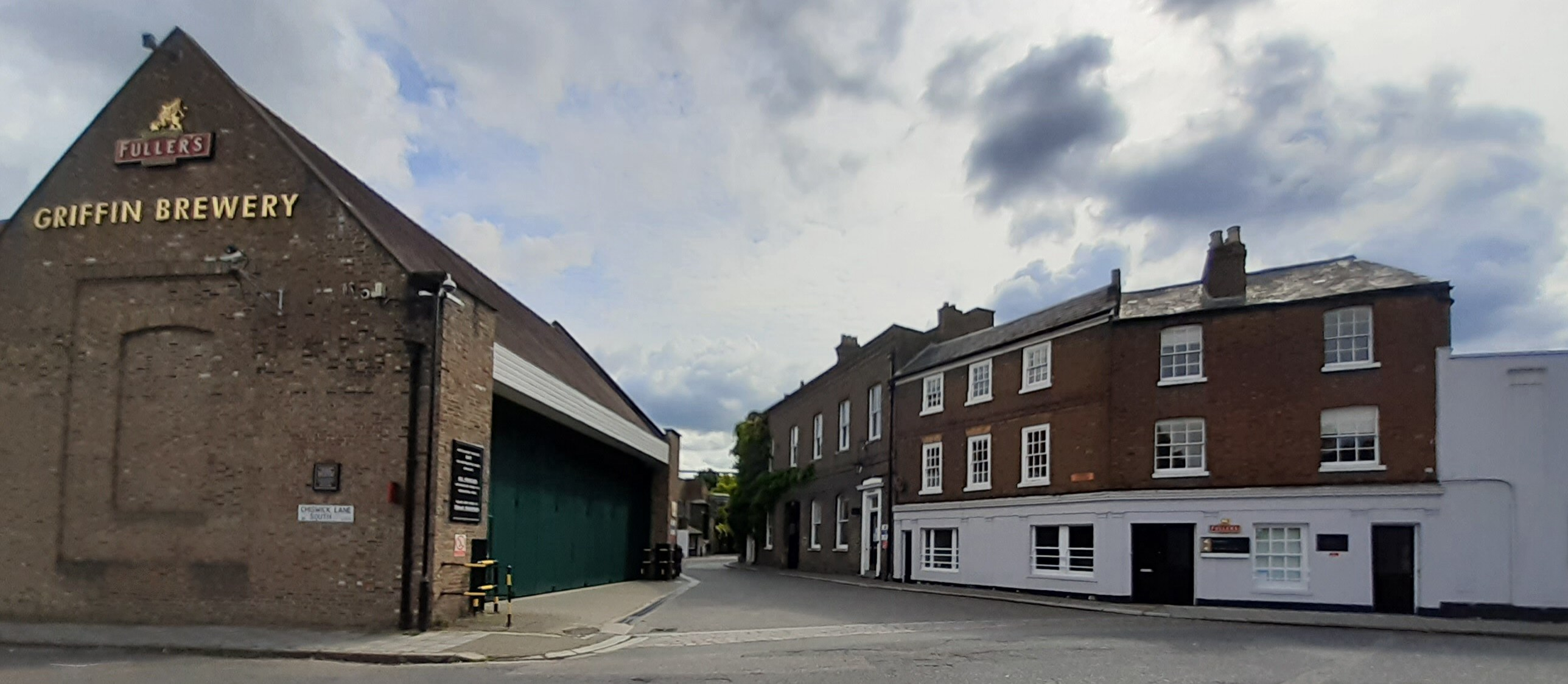
Griffin brewery from Chiswick Lane South

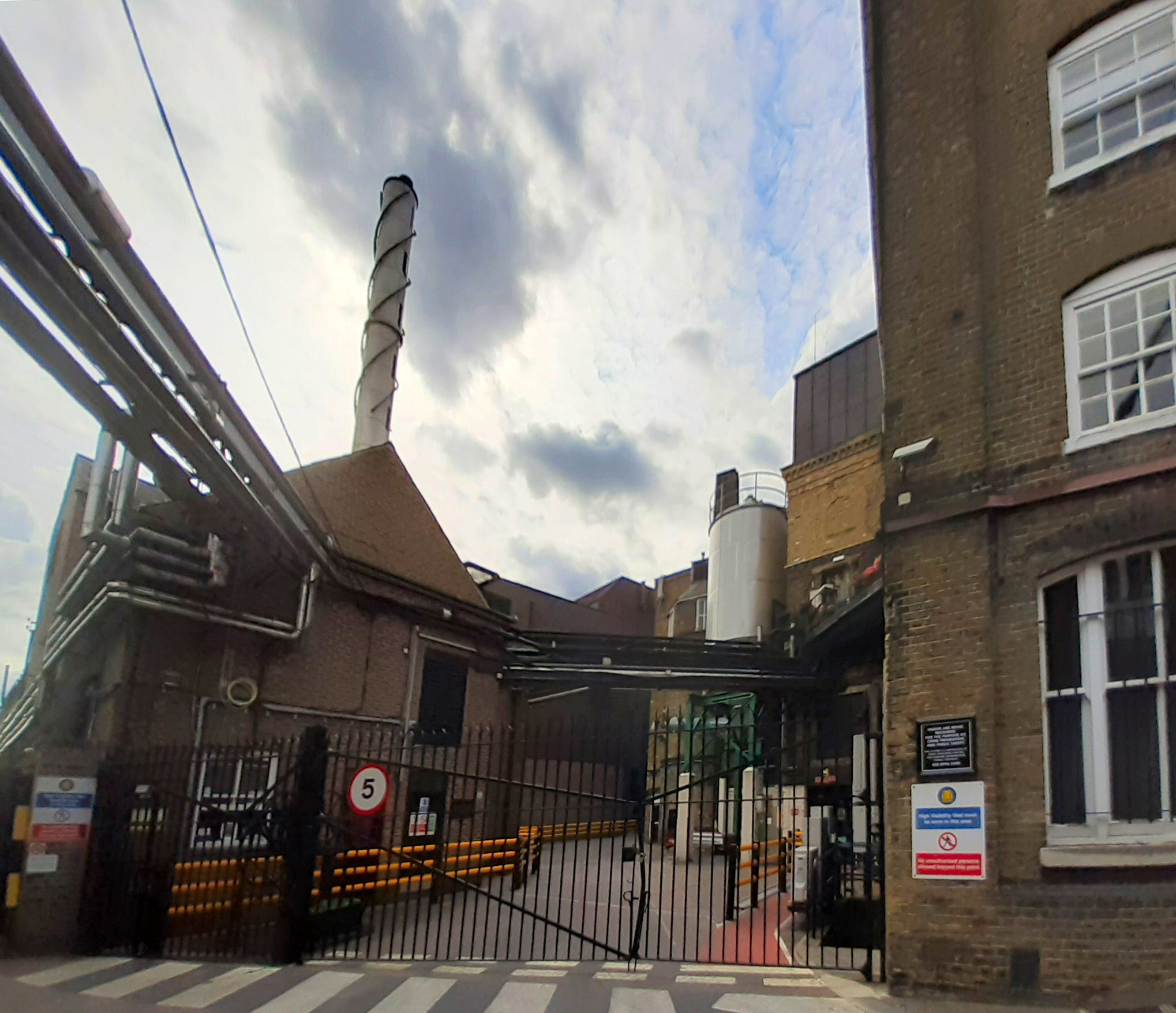
At the brewery

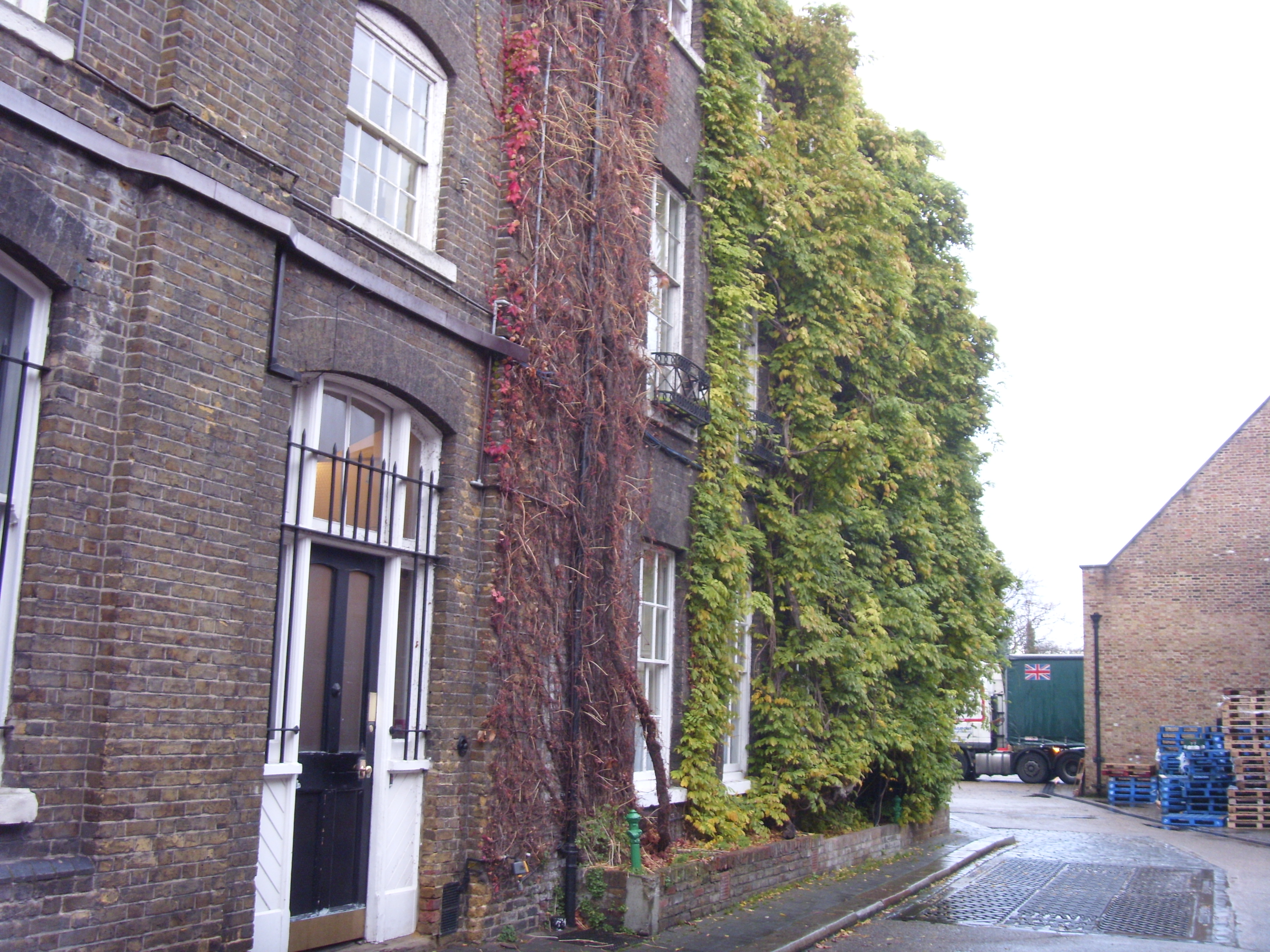
The Wisteria plant at the Griffin brewery 2008

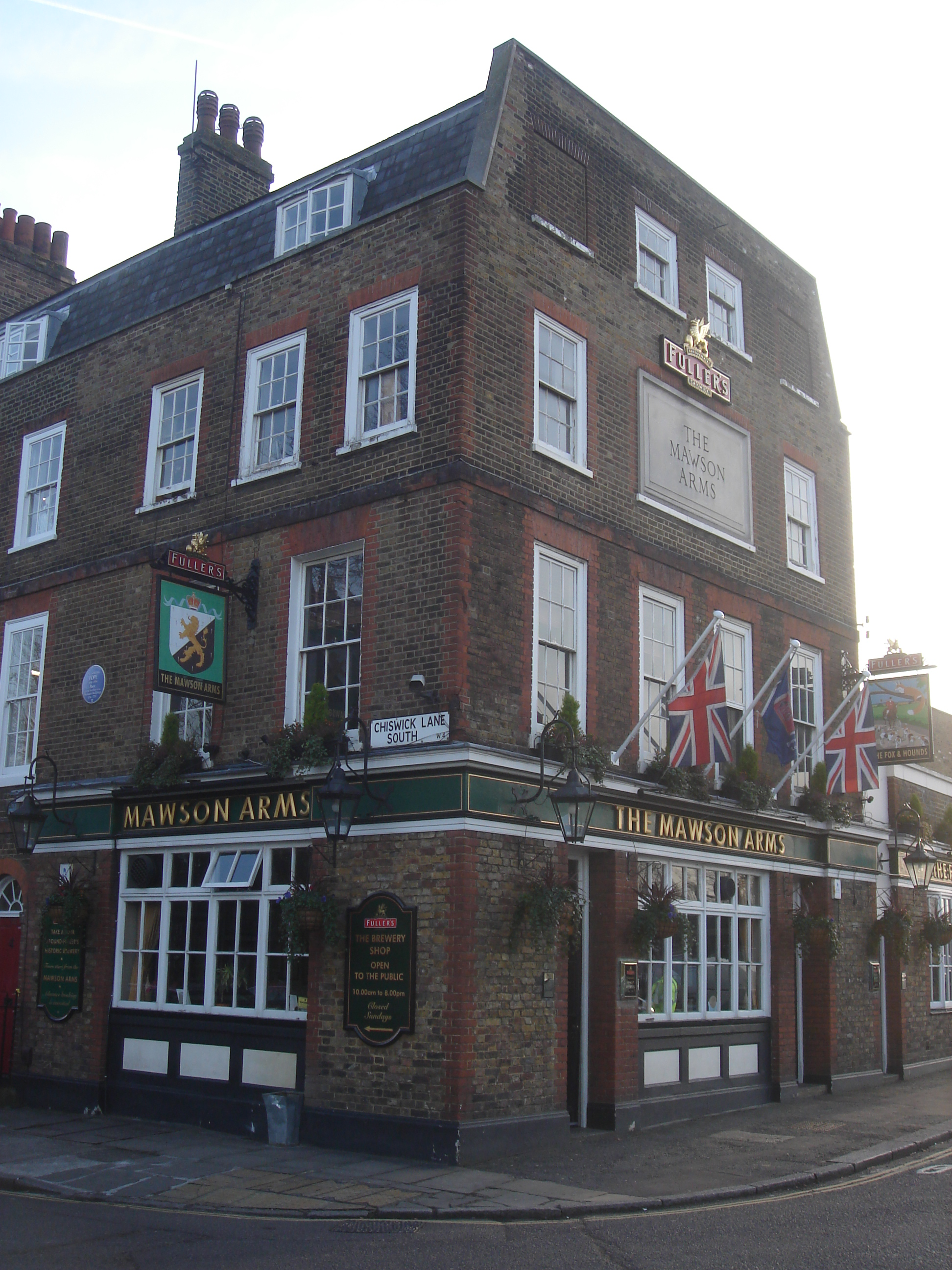
The nearest pub to the brewery, Fullers' Mawson Arms on Chiswick Lane (Closed as of 2023)

== Beers ==
Fuller's brews London Pride and other award-winning ales such as Chiswick Bitter, ESB and 1845. Its beers are exported to about 80 countries around the world. Its biggest overseas markets in 2014 were Russia and Sweden.

Its London Porter has won awards including World's Best Standard Porter and Europe's Best Standard Porter at the World Beer Awards, and Champion Keg of Great Britain. Chiswick Bitter is a 3.5% ABV sessionable ale with strong hop characteristics.

Fuller's 1845 has won awards including CAMRA's Champion Bottle Conditioned Beer in 1998. In February 1995, while visiting the Griffin Brewery, Prince Charles added a handful of hops to a copper of 1845. Fuller's Vintage Ale is released around Christmas and has been made since 1997. In 2002, the year of the Golden Jubilee of Elizabeth II, Fuller's added Goldings hops and Golden Promise malt to its Vintage Ale. Past Masters XX Strong Ale is a bottle-conditioned 7.5% strong ale based on a September 1891 entry in the brewing logs. It is made using Plumage Archer barley. Fuller's Past Masters Double Stout is a 7.4% bottle conditioned dark and creamy stout based on an August 1893 entry in the brewing logs. It was released in 2011 and is also made using Plumage Archer barley.

Fuller's 1966 Strong Ale was released in 2013 using a recipe from June 1966. It is a ruby coloured ale brewed with pale ale malt, Goldings and Fuggles hops and cane sugars. Fuller's Brewer's Reserve is a collection of four bottled beers: No. 1 - a 7.7% strong ale launched in 2008 which spent 500 days in 30-year-old single malt whisky casks; No. 2 - an 8.2% ale oak aged in Courvoisier Cognac casks; No. 3 - a 9.0% beer matured for more than two years in Auchentoshan distillery whisky casks; No. 4 - an 8.5% beer matured in Comte de Lauvia Armagnac casks for a year. No. 5 - an 8.5% beer matured for 500 days in fine old whisky casks.

Gales HSB (Horndean Special Bitter) is a cask conditioned 4.8% bitter. It was first brewed in 1959 in Horndean, Hampshire.

Frontier was launched in 2013 – Fuller's first lager since the short-lived K2 brand of the 1980s; it has an ABV of 4.5%. In 2013, Fuller's bought cider makers Cornish Orchards.

In February 2018, Fuller's bought Dark Star Brewery, based in Partridge Green, West Sussex, for an undisclosed sum.

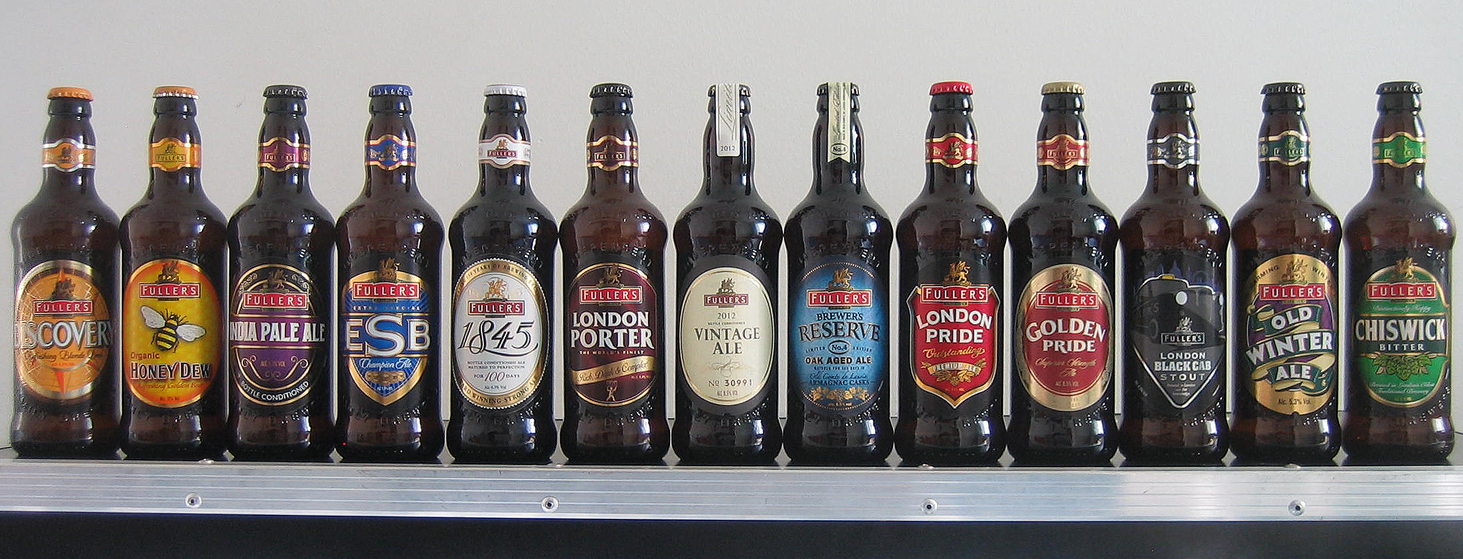
An assortment of Fuller's bottles

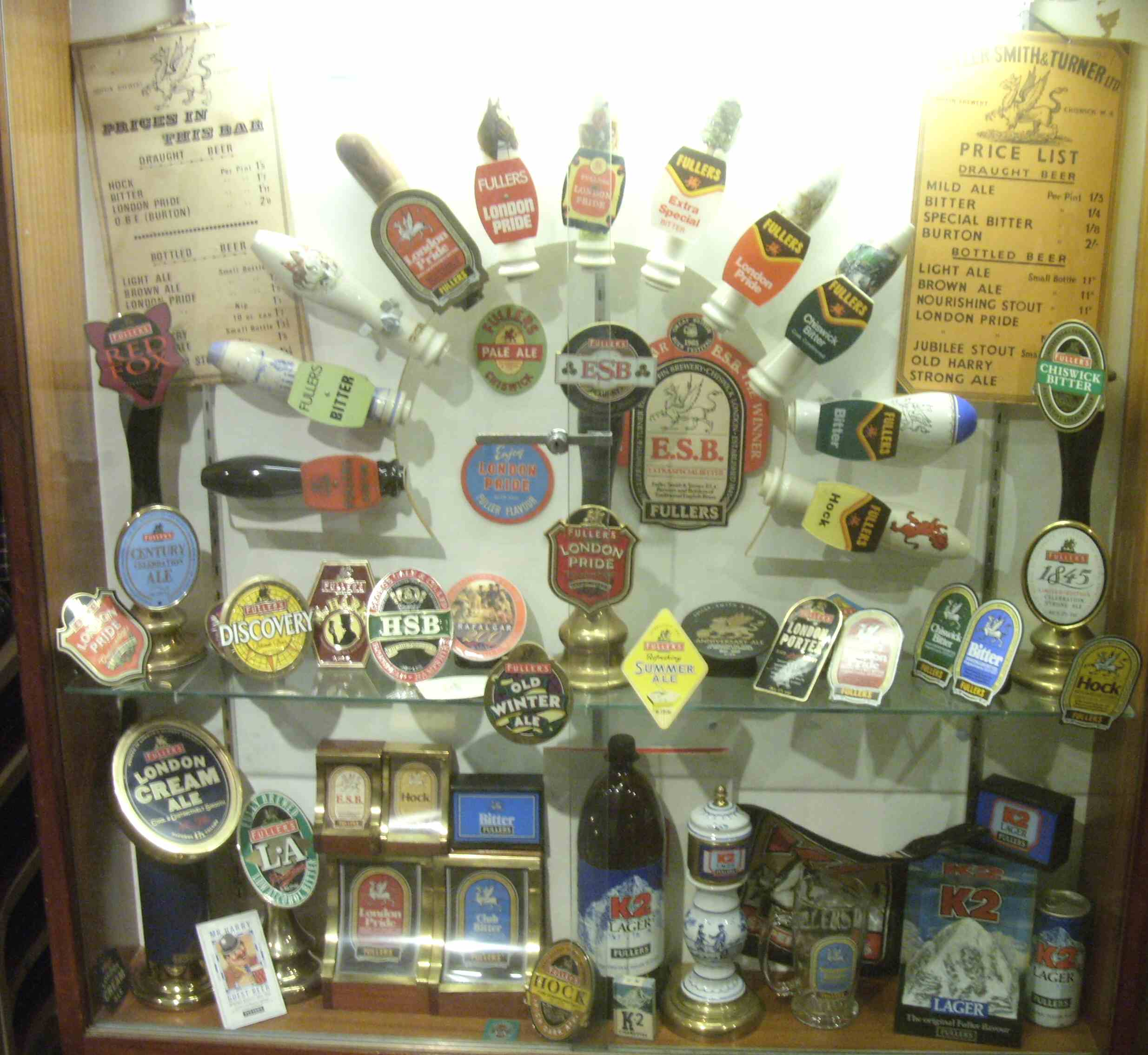
A selection of Fuller's brands from the museum display
