= Strong ale =

Type of beer

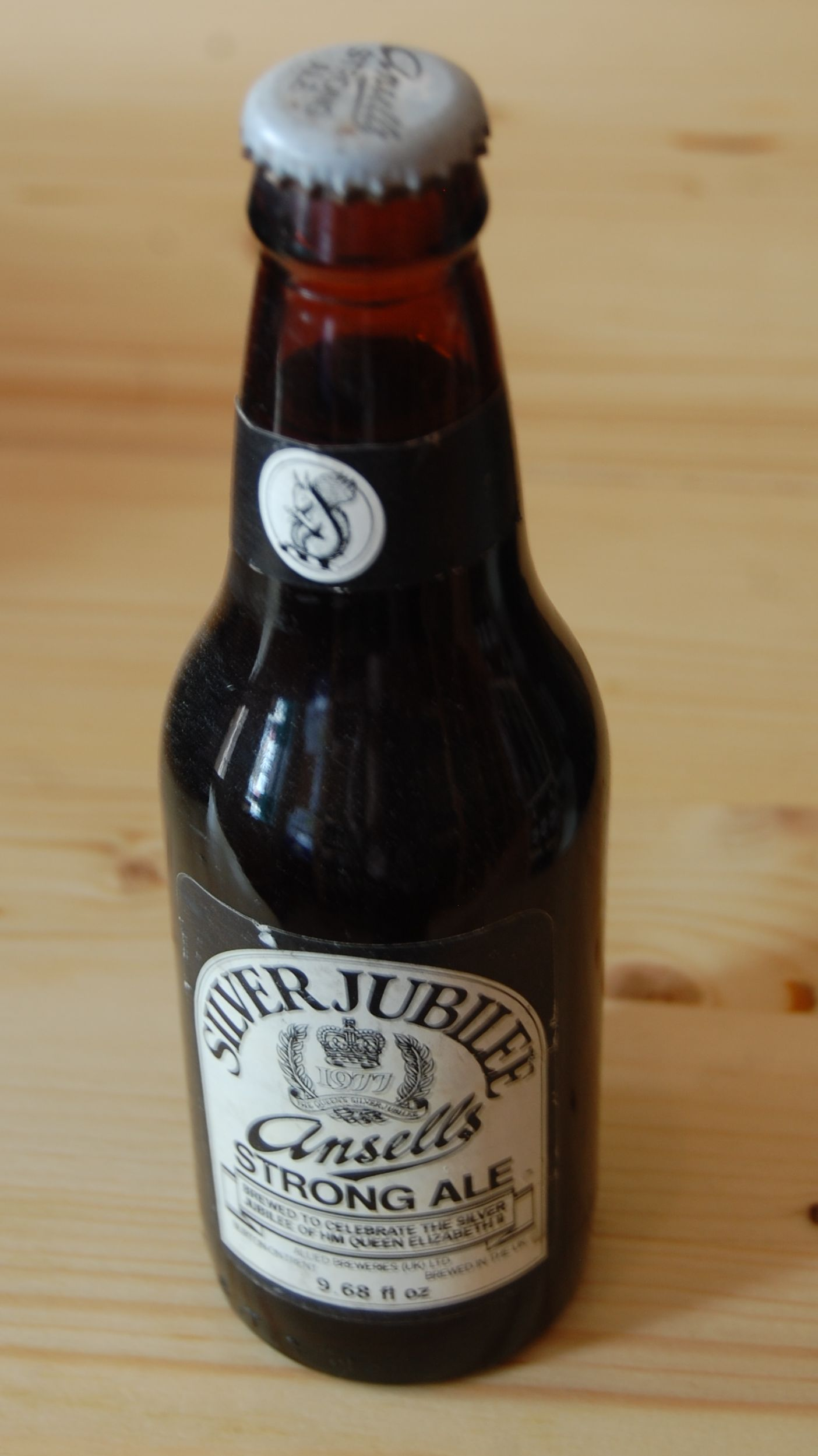
An unopened bottle of Ansells Silver Jubilee Strong Ale from 1977

Strong ale is a type of ale, usually above 5% abv and often higher, between 7 and 11% abv, which spans a number of beer styles, including old ale, barley wine, and Burton ale. Strong ales are brewed throughout Europe and beyond, including in England, Belgium, and the United States.

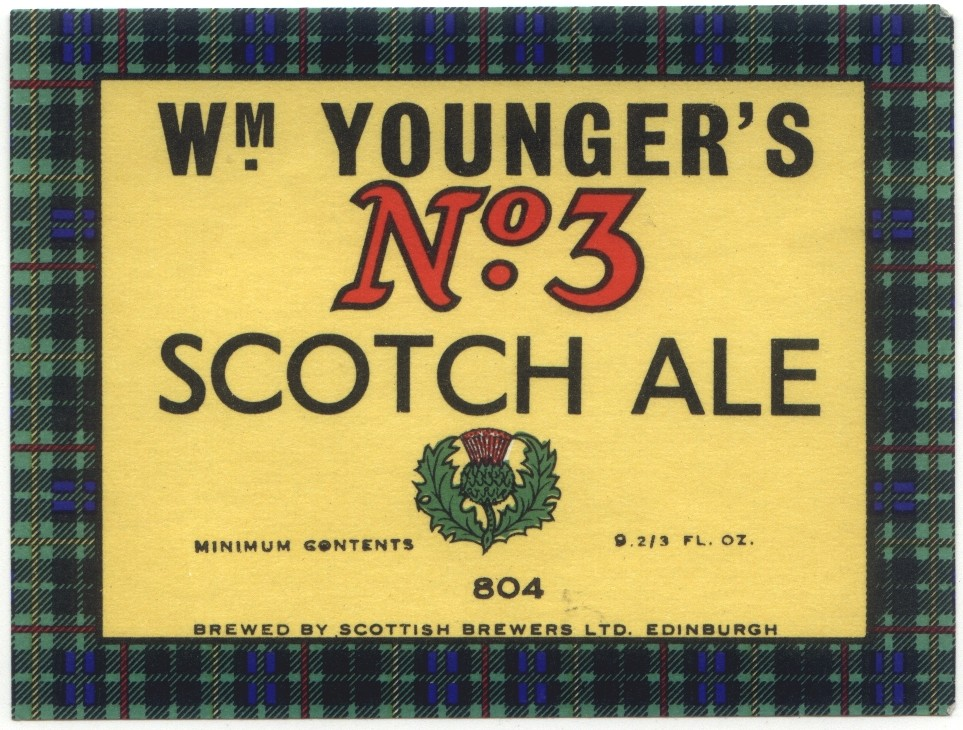
Younger's Scotch Ale label

Scotch ale was first used as a designation for strong ales exported from Edinburgh in the 18th century. Scotch ale is sometimes termed "wee heavy". A recipe for an unhopped Scotch ale can be found in the 17th-century cookery book The Closet Opened.

The strong ale described in John Mortimer's The whole Art of Husbandry (1708) was made from a ratio of eleven bushels of malt to a hogshead.

== See also ==
- Christmas beer
- List of beer styles
- Trappist beer
