= List of beer organizations =

This is a list of notable organizations related to beer:

- American Homebrewers Association (AHA)
- Australian International Beer Awards (AIBA)
- Beer Judge Certification Program (BJCP)
- Brewers Association (BA)
- Brewers Association of Australia (BAA)
- Brewers of Europe
- Campaign for Real Ale (CAMRA)
- Deutscher Brauer-Bund (DBB)
- European Beer Consumers' Union (EBCU)
- European Brewery Convention
- Great Australasian Beer SpecTAPular
- HORAL
- Independent Brewers Association (IBA)
- Independent Family Brewers of Britain (IFBB)
- Institute of Brewing and Distilling
- Society for the Preservation of Beers from the Wood (SPBW)
- Society of Independent Brewers (SIBA)
- Workers Beer Company (WBC)
- World Series of Beer Pong (WSOBP)

== See also ==
- The Beer Party (Austria)
