= DBB =

DBB or dBB can mean several things:

- Daigasso! Band Brothers, a music video game
- Dasmariñas Bagong Bayan, a public housing project in the Philippines
- Davis Brody Bond, an American architectural firm
- dB(B), a former sound level unit
- De Broglie–Bohm theory, an interpretation of quantum theory
- Deep Banana Blackout, an American jazz-funk band
- Dependency Based Build, an IBM framework
- Design–bid–build, a project delivery method
- Deutsche Bundesbahn (German Federal Railway), state railway system of Germany
- Deutsche Bundesbank (German Federal Bank), Germany's central bank
- Deutscher Bandy-Bund (German Bandy Federation), the sports governing body for bandy in Germany
- Deutscher Basketball Bund (German Basketball Federation), the sports governing body for basketball in Germany
- Deutscher Baugewerksbund (German Union of Building Trades), former trade union in Germany
- Deutscher Beamtenbund (German Civil Service Federation), a trade union for German government employees
- Deutscher Brauer-Bund (German Brewers Federation), a German federation
- Don Bosco Bandel, a Catholic boys' school in Bandel, India
- Double Barrel Benefit, an annual fundraiser for WKNC-FM.
- "Duffle Bag Boy", a song by Playaz Circle
- El Alamein International Airport (IATA: DBB), in El Dabaa, Matrouh Governorate, Egypt
