= William Bradford (architect) =

British architect

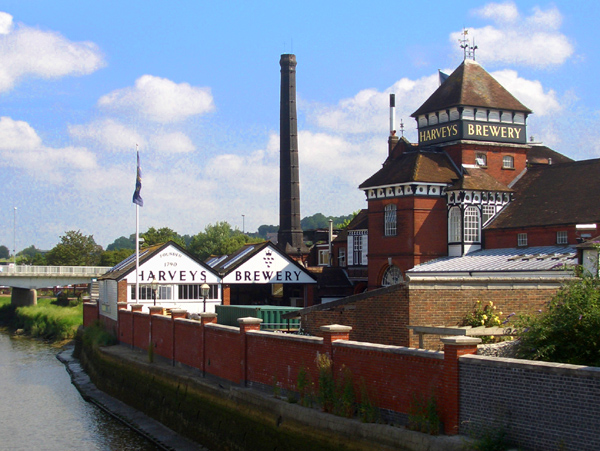
Harveys brewery as seen from the Cliffe Bridge in Lewes, East Sussex, July 2006

William Bradford (1845–1919) was a prolific English architect of breweries.

== Personal life ==
Born in 1845 in Devon, he was the son of Robert Bradford (1818–1875), a builder. He was responsible for building or altering 70 breweries, his first commission being a small addition to the "Hope Brewery" in East Grinstead (1879). He died at home in Surbiton on 2 February 1919.

Bradford married Hannah Laura Barrat (1848–1893) on 23 April 1872 in St Pancras, London England.

== Works ==
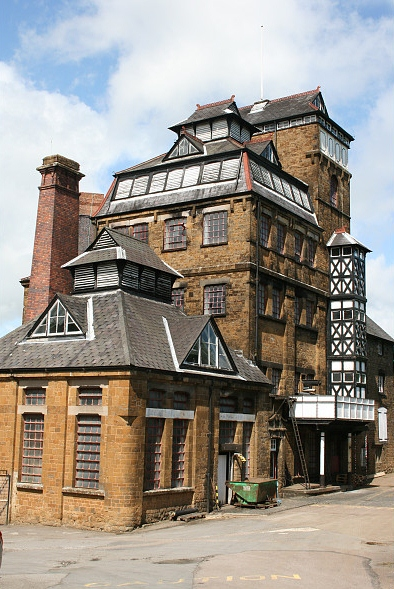
Hook Norton brewery

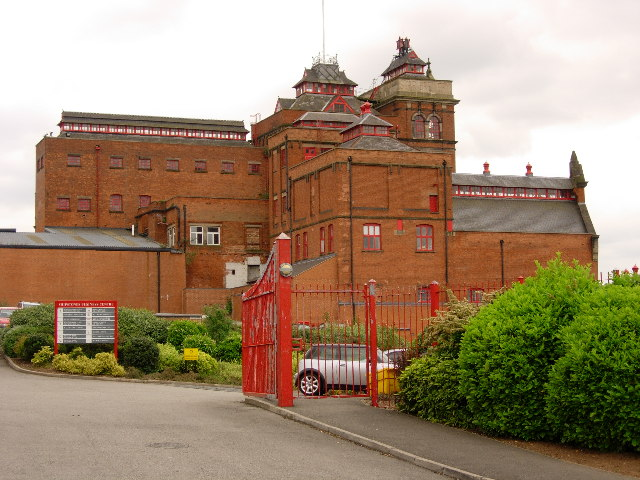
Shipstones Brewery

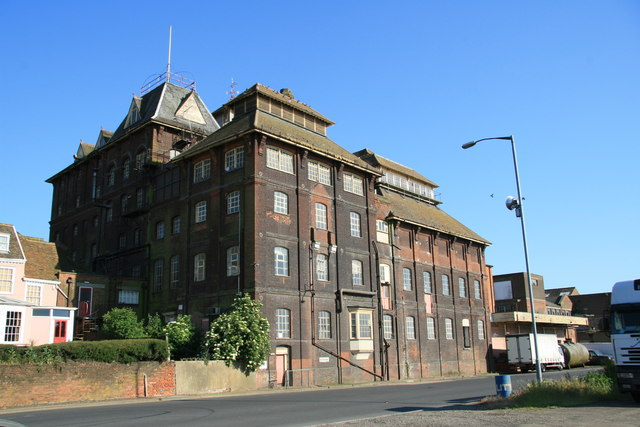
Tolly Cobbold Cliff Brewery

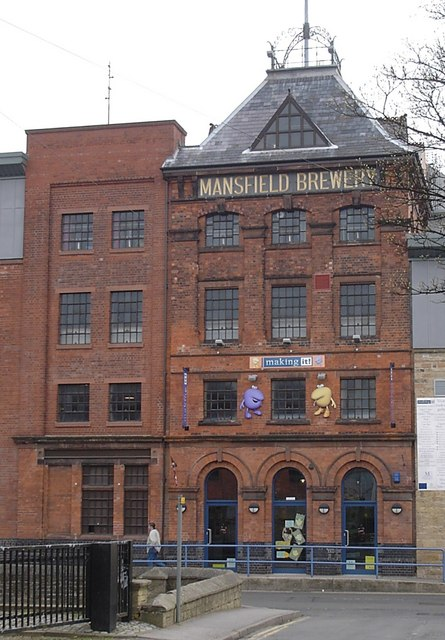
Mansfield Brewery

William Bradford worked in the brewing industry from the late 1860s and established his architectural practice at 40 King William Street, London EC4, in 1879, moving to Carlton Chambers, 12 Regent Street, London W1, in early 1882. Bradford's works included building or altering over 70 breweries and maltings throughout the country, although the majority were in the south of England. His practice concentrated almost entirely on breweries, maltings and ancillary buildings, notably tower breweries, eventually arriving at a distinctive decorative style, featuring ironwork and a picturesque roof line, that is easily identifiable today. The practice was known as William Bradford & Sons by 1905. The firm continued under his sons, W.Stovin-Bradford and J. W. Bradford, and designed several lavishly ornamented public houses and was last heard of in 1946.

W. Stovin-Bradford presented a paper on the architecture of breweries at the White Horse Hotel, Congreave Street, Birmingham on 21 January 1932. Born in 1877 he died during the war in 1940. One of his sons was Frank Stovin-Bradford

William Bradford was the architect of an unexecuted new brewery which was proposed for a site in Ashbourne Road, Limerick, in 1895 and of another on a site next to the railway station in Dundalk, Co. Louth, for the Great Northern Brewery Co. in 1896. The brewery in Limerick was abandoned for economic reasons after objections by the local Redemptorists. It is unclear if William Bradford was the architect of the Great Northern Brewery in Dundalk which was built in 1896. A contemporary picture of the brewery appears to match the style of other breweries.

Breweries and buildings that he is responsible for are:

- Hope Brewery East Grinsted (1879)
- Salters of Rickmansworth around 1888

Erection a new 40-quarter plant, as well as enlargement of the existing premises

- The Bottle House for Camden Brewery (1900–1901) Grade II Listed Hawley Crescent Camden London
- Prince of Wales Brewery, Nottingham (1891) Grade II Listed Alpine Street, Basford, Nottingham
- Swan Brewery, Fulham (1882)
- Shipstones Star Brewery, New Basford 1901 Shipstones Brewery
- Castle Brewery, Newark 1889–90 Grade II Listed Albert Street, Newark
- Mansfield Brewery 1907 Demolished 2008
- Cheltenham Brewery 1898

Tower still remains. Henrietta Street, Cheltenham

- Hook Norton Brewery 1899

Hook Norton, Oxfordshire

- Wells Brewery, Watford 1902
- The Unicorn Brewery Ipswich
- Tolly Cobbold Brewery Ipswich (1896) Grade II listed
- Albion Brewery

Only Grade II listed brewery engineers house stands 27a Mile End Rd, London

- Harveys Bridge Wharf Brewery 1882 Lewes Harveys Brewery
- Courage Alton Brewery Hampshire
- Lamb Brewery Chiswick (1901)
- Hanson Brewery 1890 Hanson's Brewery was completed, adjacent to the Hardy's site, with a 6-storey brewery tower as its centrepiece.
- McMullen's Old Brewery (1891)
- George Ware Brewery Frant (1893)
- Offilers Brewery Derby (1884)
- Camerons Brewery Lion Brewery, Hartlepool addition of a new maltings in 1883
- Teignworthy Brewery Ltd, The Maltings
- Tucker's Maltings, Newton Abbot, Devon (1900)
- McArthur's Warehouse maltings, Gasferry Road, Bristol (1897)
- H Luker 25-quarter Brewery, Southend (1891)
- Hartleys Brewery, West Cowick 1892 (Brewers Journal 1892)
- Wooldridge & Co Tottenham Brewery (1892)
- Magee Marshall & Co Brewery, Bolton 1893 (Brewers Journal)
- Canon Brewery Clerkenwell 1894
- Millwall Working Mens Club (1900)
- Royal Brewery Brentford 1899 Alteration and additions (BJ 1899 p215)
- Phipps Bridge Street Brewery, Northampton. extension 1905
