= Blankstate. =

American emo band

blankstate.
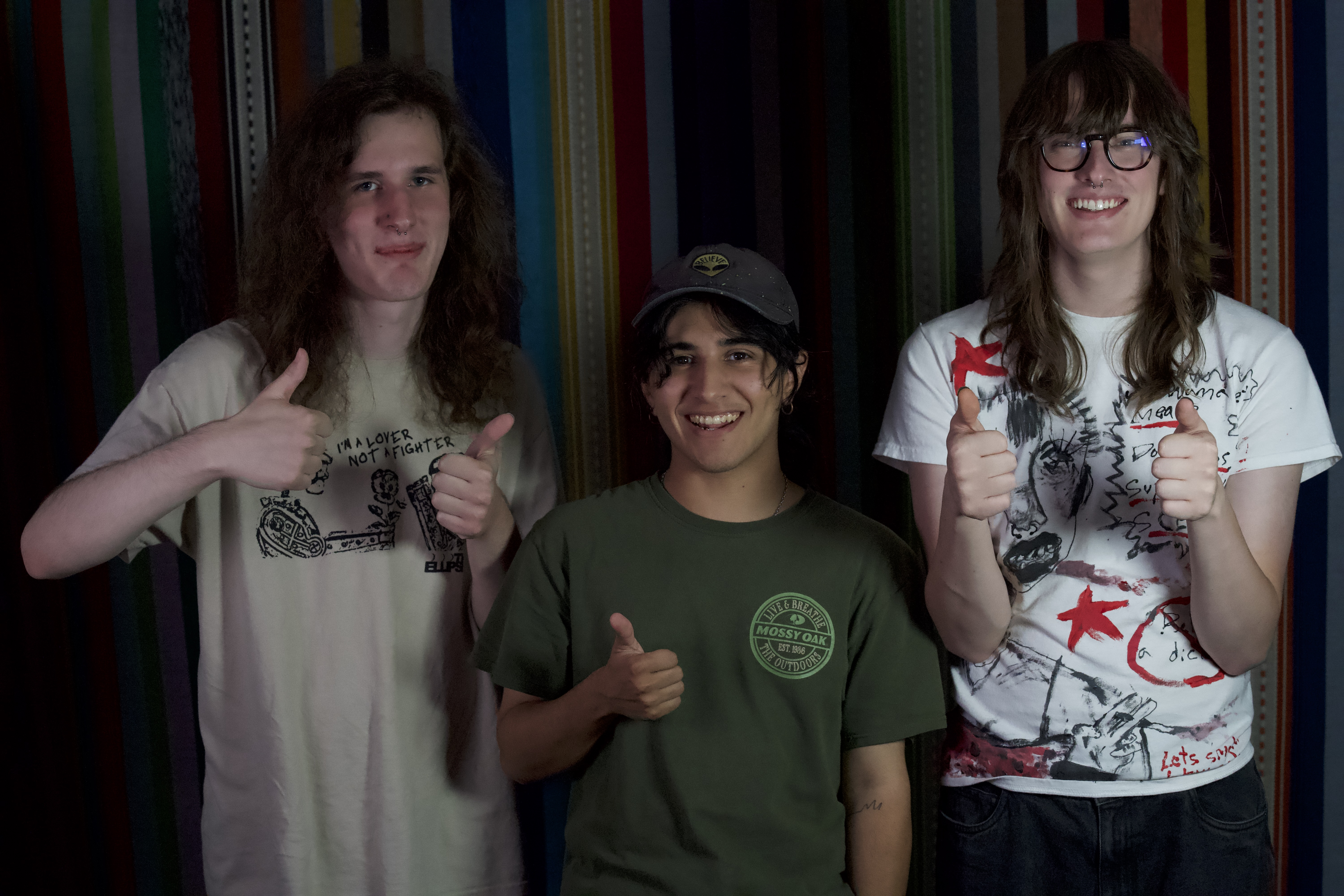
- blankstate. in 2024. From left to right: Seth, Jacob, Faye

Background information
- Origin: Charlotte, North Carolina
- Genres: Emo; Indie music
- Years active: 2018–present
- Spinoffs: callmepretty
- Members: Jacob Juarez; Faye Group; Seth Brown

blankstate. is an emo indie music band formed in 2018 and based in Charlotte, North Carolina.

The group had its first show in 2018. They formed as a cover band when the members met each other in middle school, but then soon started creating and performing their own music. The group developed the music of their first album in the context of COVID affecting the culture of music. The name refers to "a blank state of mind" and is written as one word with a period.

Their home region near Charlotte, North Carolina has an active indie music scene, which gave the group many opportunities to travel to perform at live music venues. Their music style is energetic and designed to be experienced as live performance.

In 2025 the band toured performing in Japan.

== Members ==
- Jacob Juarez (Guitar, Lead Vocals)
- Faye Grout (Bass, Backing Vocals)
- Seth Brown (Drums)

== Discography ==
=== Studio albums ===
- The World Is Not Kind To These Things (2022)

=== EPs ===
- alone in the end (2021)
- LOTUS (2024)
- RITUAL (2026)

== Further consideration ==
- Damon, Monica (13 February 2024). "blankstate. At The Addition (Full Session)". At The Addition.
- The Loaf (15 May 2023). "blankstate". Off the Record. WKNC-FM.
- Mikey; Tommy V; JROB (29 July 2025). "Ep. 275 - blankstate". Bardown Breakdown.
- Terry (8 April 2023). "RBTZTV ORIGINAL BLANKSTATE". rBeatz Radio. RBTZTV.
- Ice Trey (April 13, 2023). "Kickin' it w/blankstate". What's Up, Charlotte?. Uptown Audio.
- "Á La Carte Sessions: 002 blankstate. ('LOTUS' EP Anniversary) (FULL SESSION)". A La Carte Sessions. 12 October 2025.
