= Drayman =

Driver of a dray

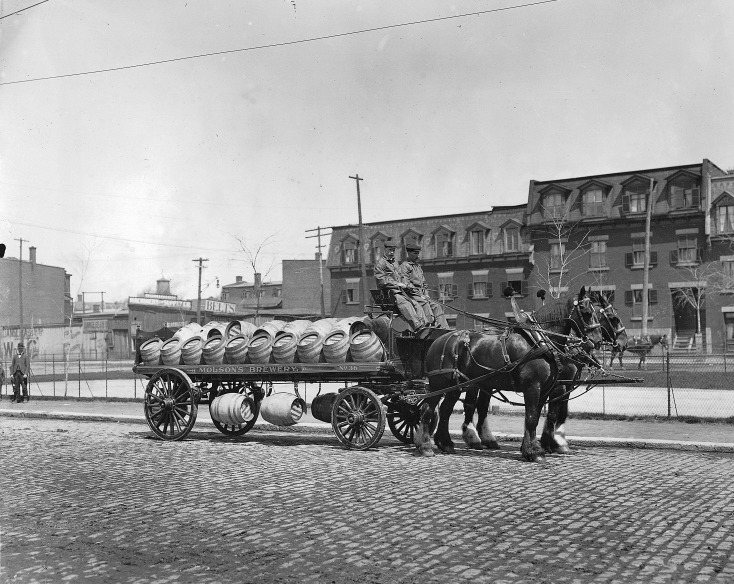
Brewery draymen c. 1908

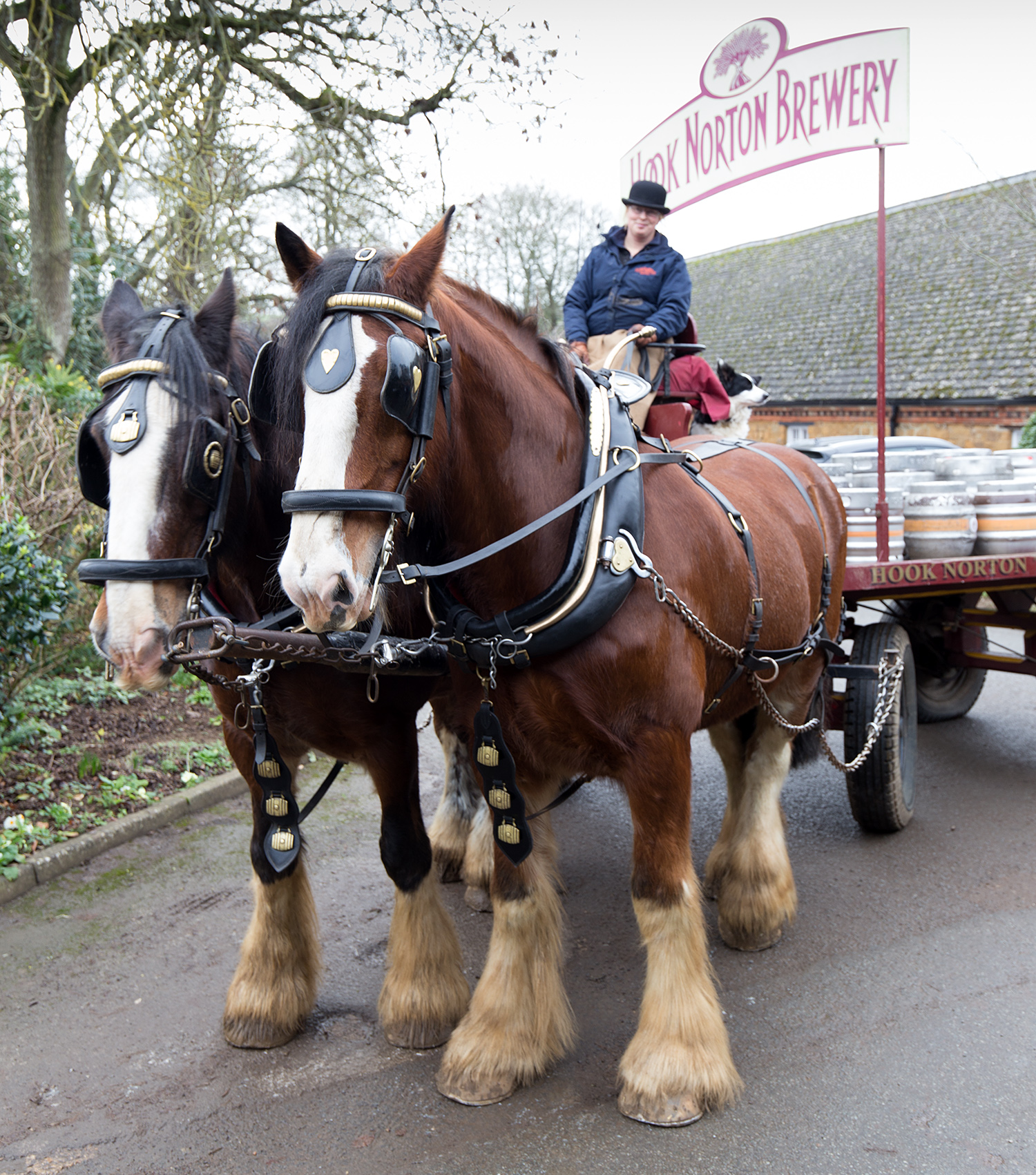
Dray of the Hook Norton Brewery

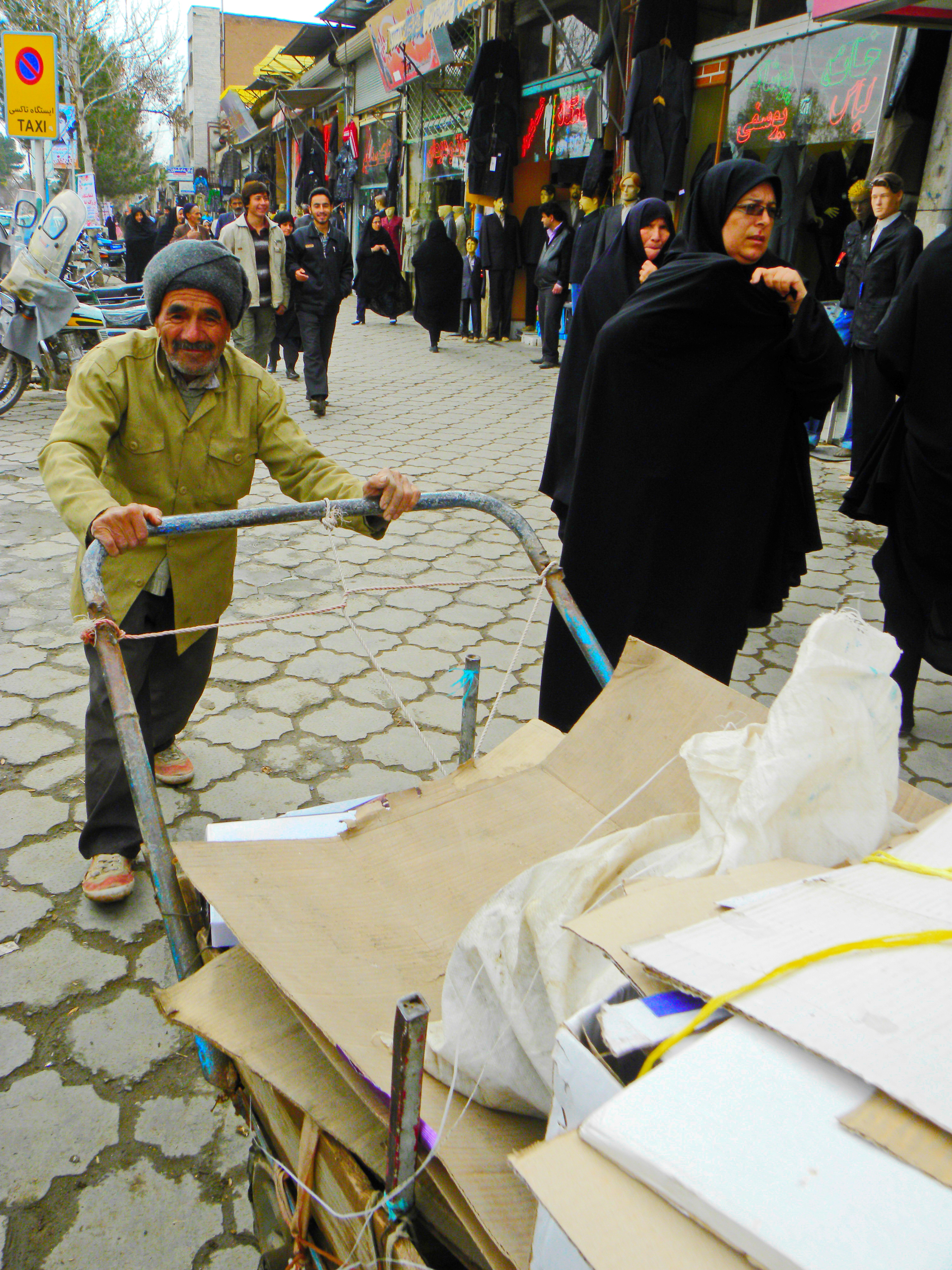
A drayman in Nisapur, Iran

A drayman was historically the driver of a dray, a low, flat-bed wagon without sides, pulled generally by horses or mules that were used to transport all kinds of goods.

== Modern use ==
The word "drayman" is used in U.S. ports as the term for over-the-road highway truck drivers who deliver containers to and from the port.

A drayage company and draymen provide carriage from or to a port or railway ramp. The items hauled are either ocean or rail containers. The contents are either cross docked for outbound long haul carriage or the container is drayed to the receiver who unloads it. The drayman then hauls the empty back to the ocean port or rail yard.

The term is used in the United Kingdom for brewery delivery men, even though routine horse-drawn deliveries are almost entirely extinct. Some breweries still maintain teams of horses and a dray, but these are used only for special occasions such as festivals or opening new premises. There are some breweries still delivering daily/weekly using horses, Hook Norton in Oxfordshire and Samuel Smith's in Tadcaster being two of them.

Punch Almanac (June 24, 1908) published a cartoon, making fun of a social distinction between omnibus drivers and brewery draymen, as one of two cartoons ridiculing city transport.
