= Tower brewery =

Type of brewery building using gravity to aid liquid flow

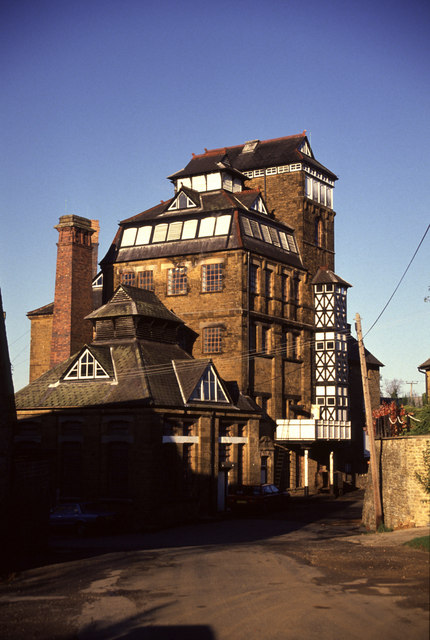
Hook Norton Brewery

A tower brewery is a distinct form of brewery, identified by its external buildings being arranged in the form of a vertical tower.

The purpose of a tower brewery is to allow this multi-stage flow process to continue by gravity, rather than lifting or pumping the brew liquor between stages. Once the bulk raw materials, water and barley malt, are first raised to the top of the tower, they can then mostly flow downwards without requiring further pumping.

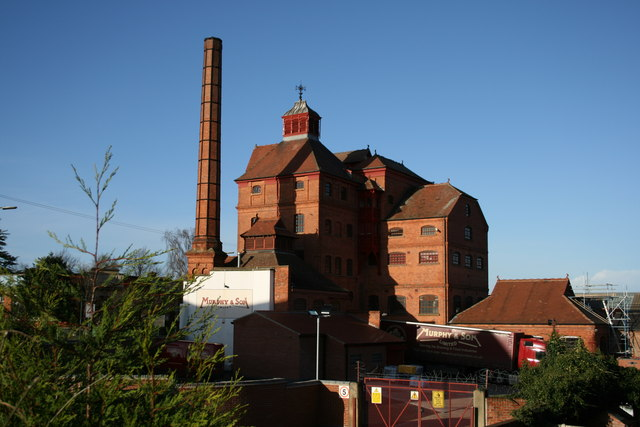
Murphy & Sons, Prince of Wales Brewery, Nottingham

Tower breweries developed in the late Victorian period, the first examples from around 1870, the majority in the 1880s. At this time steam power was available, but not electricity. Powering a single large pumping step was practical, but multiple small pumps around a building would be much less so.

The buildings of a tower brewery are arranged as a tower with around six floors. There may be a single tower, but many breweries were less regular, with portions reaching varying heights. Only relatively small areas were needed for the highest floors. The highest point would be a small water tower, the next highest a prominent ventilated attic giving good airflow for coolers.

== Brewing process ==
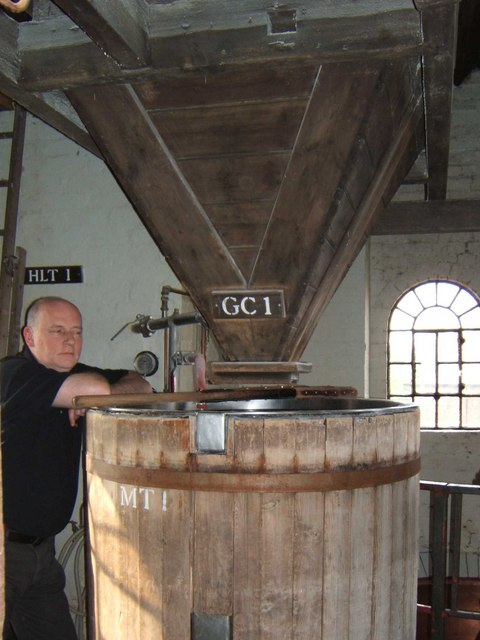
Grist mill upstairs at the Sarah Hughes Brewery, Sedgley

The brewing process comprises many stages, each taking place in their own specialised vessels. Multiple brews may be in progress simultaneously, a new brew being mashed and boiled most days, then allowed to ferment for a week in one of several sets of fermenting tuns.

Brewing begins at the top of the tower. Water is pumped up to the 'cold liquor' storage tank (5th floor), (Note: Floor numbers are given here in UK style, with the "ground floor" being the outdoor ground level and counting from 1 above this. "5th floor" (UK) would thus be "6th floor" (US).) liquor being the term for the water that will become beer. The quality of this water is extremely important in brewing, often controlling the location of the brewery. In many cases it is taken from a borehole and so will already have been pumped from below ground, before being raised up the tower.

The second main ingredient in beer is barley malt. This has already been malted in a malthouse outside the brewery tower and may have been stored for some time since. The malted grains are lifted up the tower mechanically, by either a sack hoist or a continuous elevator. From here they are fed into a grist mill (4th floor) which crushes the grains to open their seed coat and allow good extraction of their contents.

The 3rd floor is used for temporary storage before the first major brewing step. Grist is weighed and stored in the grist hopper. Liquor is heated in the hot liquor tank. Steam is used for this heating, which avoids the need for both a furnace, and its fuel, high up in the tower.

Brewing proper begins with mashing, the steeping of a mash of the grist with the hot liquor in a mash tun on the 2nd floor to extract the maltose sugars and other starchy components of the grist. This produces a sweet, sticky liquid called wort. The process is begun early in the morning on a brewing day and takes a couple of hours. This time allows starches from the malt to convert to sugars that can be fermented. The wort is lautered or run off for brewing and then sparging, spraying the drained mash from above with more hot liquor for a couple more hours, extracts the remaining sugars.

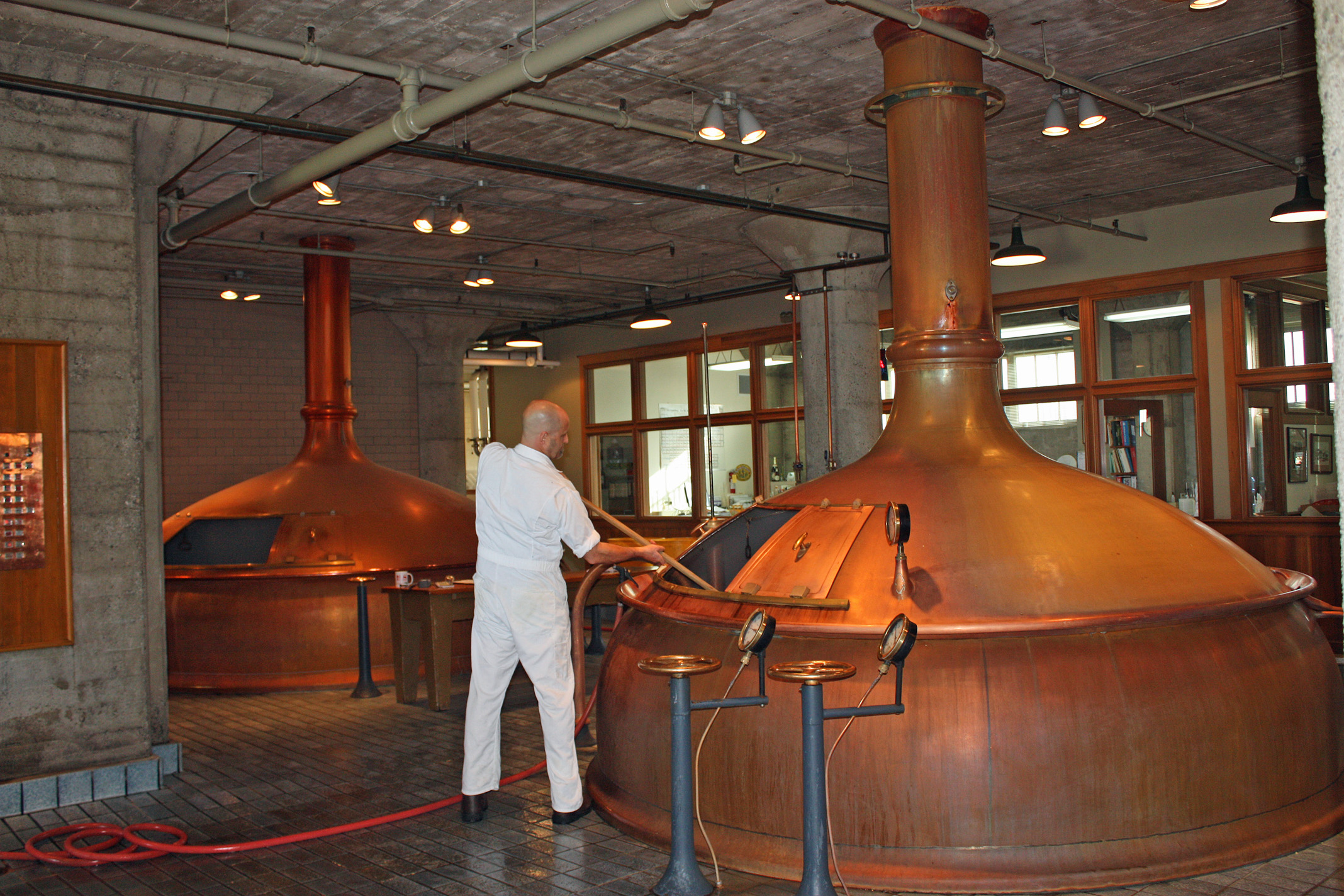
Large modern brewing coppers

Wort is allowed to run down into the brew coppers or kettles on the 1st floor. These are heated, originally by fires beneath them. To give better temperature control, these too are now usually heated by steam. Their temperature is gradually raised to boiling point as the wort is slowly run in. Hops are now added. The precise type of hops and even the time at which they are added are crucial factors in the taste of particular beers. Once all the wort is in the copper, boiling proceeds to extract the bitter flavours from the hops for an hour or so.

The spent hops are removed from the bitter liquor by decanting or 'casting' it into the hop back, a vessel on the ground floor beneath the coppers. The spent hops settle out and the liquor is strained through them.

A non-gravity process now takes place, where the liquor is pumped back up the tower to coolers in the fourth floor attic. A green or unfermented wort still at brewing temperatures would kill the yeasts used in fermentation, so must first be cooled.

Cooled liquor flows down to the first floor and the fermenting tuns. Yeast is added and fermentation begins. Fermentation takes around a week and a large brewery may have enough fermentation volume to contain several brews simultaneously. The large area needed often extends into a lower building alongside the brewing tower. Towards the end of this time, the yeast is removed.

Beer from the fermentation vessels is run to storage on the ground floor below. Here it may be cleared, filtered and stored before being racked into casks kept on a stillage.

=== Brewery engine ===
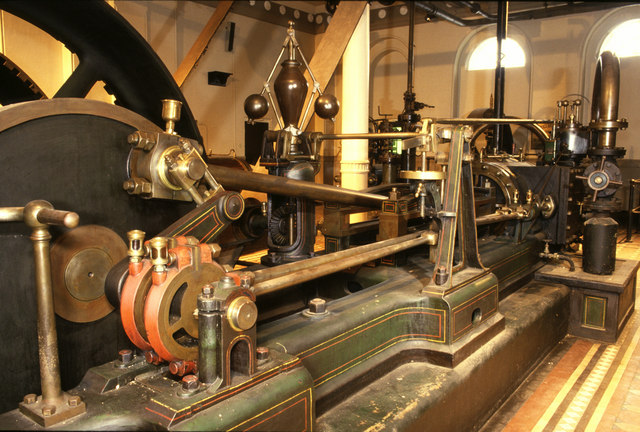
1884 engine from Greenall Whitley Brewery, Warrington

Tower breweries are typically powered by a steam engine, which gives such breweries their sometimes alternate name of "steam breweries". This single engine is housed on the ground floor. The engine's primary tasks are to lift the two main ingredients: water and barley malt up the tower but other tasks are performed as well:

- Driving the grist mill, to crush the grains of malt.
- Mashing and raking equipment in the mash tun.
- Pumps to raise hot green wort from the brewing copper up to the cooler.
- Lifts or cranes for filled casks
- The sack hoist for loading malt. This is often in either an external wooden housing on the side of the tower building or else a protruding lucarne.

Boilers to supply the steam engine are housed in a single-storey boilerhouse alongside the main brewhouse, usually with a prominent chimney to provide natural draught. Process steam from the same boilers heats the large quantity of water needed in brewing, including hot liquor (water used in mashing that will become beer) and may also be used to heat brewing coppers. Some breweries, such as Hook Norton, still use direct heat beneath these brew kettles, but this raises problems of temperature control and local overheating.

Media related to Brewery engines at Wikimedia Commons

== Architecture ==
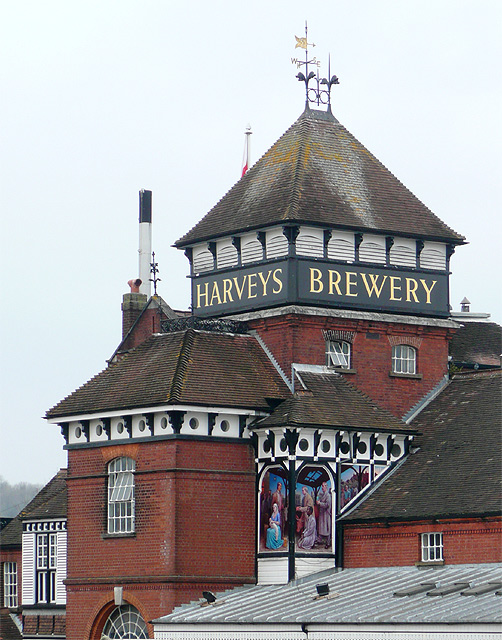
Harveys Bridge Wharf Brewery, Lewes

Many brewers used their building as a form of advertising, both by displaying the beer's identity prominently on an impressive building, and by representing the brewery on beer bottle labels or other advertising. Some breweries were in prominent brewing towns, such as Burton on Trent. These catered to a large distant and export market, encouraged by expanding rail transport in this period, and the brewery's image was an important part of this early brand identity.

Smaller breweries often served a local area. The appearance of the brewery, especially when tall, was often a major advertising site. Some tower breweries were bluff brick-faced towers but many were highly distinctive and used architectural whimsy to make them distinctive. Brewing was a profitable business and brewers could afford to indulge their architects with details such as Mock Tudor half-timbering and polychrome brick. The timbered architecture was encouraged by the necessary timber louvres forming the upper story of the tower around the wort cooler. Roof shape was often complicated, with many sections of hipped roof and triangular dormers.

A noted architect of such breweries was William Bradford of London, responsible for the Grade II* listed Harveys Bridge Wharf Brewery in Lewes, McMullen & Sons, Old Cross Brewery, Hertford and the Grade II listed Hook Norton Brewery, among others.

== Surviving tower breweries ==
- Arkell's Brewery, Swindon
- Cliff Brewery, Tolly Cobbold, Ipswich. Brewing ceased in 2002, but the Grade II listed building remains.
- Harveys Bridge Wharf Brewery, Lewes
- Frederic Robinson Ltd, Unicorn Brewery, Stockport
- McMullen & Sons, Old Cross, Hertford
- Melbourn Brothers, All Saints Brewery, Stamford
- Hook Norton Brewery
- T & R Theakston, Masham
- Wadworth's, Northgate Brewery, Devizes
- Billson's Brewery, Beechworth, Victoria, Australia
- Wigan Brewhouse, Wigan, Greater Manchester
