= European Brewery Convention =

- European Brewery Convention
- Abbreviation: EBC
- Formation: 1946 as Centre Continental de Brasserie; 1947 (EBC)
- Purpose: An organisation representing the technical and scientific interests of the greater brewing industry in Europe
- Headquarters: The Brewers of Europe house, Rue Caroly 23-25 in B-1050 Brussels, Belgium
- Region served: Europe
- Parent organisation: The Brewers of Europe
- Website: http://www.europeanbreweryconvention.eu

The European Brewery Convention (EBC) is an organisation representing the technical and scientific interests of the brewing sector in Europe. The EBC defines itself as the scientific and technological arm of The Brewers of Europe. Among brewers, EBC is perhaps best known for the EBC units measuring beer and wort colour, as well as EBC units for quantifying turbidity (also known as haze) in beer. Equally, the EBC congress is recognised globally as a significant meeting event for the world's brewing, malting and beer fermentation scientists and technologists, taking place every two years.

== History ==
The European Brewery Convention was founded in 1946 as a direct result of the critical situation concerning raw material supply (specifically malted barley and hops) which had arisen due to World War II. The founding members included the first president of the organisation, Prof. Philippe Kreiss. The name European Brewery Convention was adopted at the first EBC congress held in 1947 in the Dutch seaside resort of Scheveningen; in the interim, it was briefly known as the Centre Continental de Brasserie (Continental Brewery Centre).

Its mission was largely focused on two areas of collaboration amongst brewers in Europe; namely, to strengthen their collective bargaining power in terms of securing adequate malting barley in both quantity and quality, as well as to encourage the leading brewing nations, which had seen their industry being ravaged by the war, to re-engage in scientific exchange leading to the increased implementation of modern brewing and fermentation techniques.

In the late 1990, discussions between EBC and the Confédération des Brasseries du Marché Commun (C.B.M.C. - latterly to become The Brewers of Europe) were underway to investigate a merger of both associations. The aim was to expand both organisations' mutual knowledge base and explore the synergies afforded by a largely shared membership, the national brewing trade associations operating in most European countries. The merger documents were signed in November 2006 and, following the retirement of the EBC Secretary General Marjolein van Wijngaarden at the end of 2007, the organisation moved from its former headquarters in Zoeterwoude, The Netherlands to Brussels, Belgium.

Not being an independent organisation any longer, the title of Secretary-General was abolished in favour of the EBC Executive Officer who manages the day-to-day tasks of EBC and is, at the same time, a full member of staff of The Brewers of Europe secretariat. The position is currently held by John M. Brauer. EBC maintains limited autonomy in budgetary matters whilst in most other respects has transformed itself into an integrated part of The Brewers of Europe aisbl.

== Governance of EBC ==
Early in 2007 both governing bodies of EBC, the Board and Council, had been done away with to make way for a transitional executive body designed to steer the organisation through the merger. The EBC Executive Committee was called into being under the chairmanship of the EBC President, Dr. Hilary Jones.

After the first "post-merger" congress held in Hamburg in 2009 (32nd EBC congress), EBC formulated a governance structure that was better designed to suit the changed needs of EBC within the fold of a larger entity. Critical to the success of this was the initiative by the EBC President Christian von der Heide and the Secretary General of The Brewers of Europe, Pierre-Olivier Bergeron, to harmonise the respective associations for more effectiveness. Among the changes proposed, one of the most important was to offer a more representative platform not only to brewing companies, but allow the national brewing trade associations more of a say in the constitution and governance of EBC.

Structured along analogous lines to The Brewers of Europe Executive Committee in order to achieve better alignment, the EBC Executive Team's members are from:

- The five major brewers (also known as permanent Board members) producing roughly 70% of the volume output of beer in Europe, namely, these are Carlsberg, Heineken, AB-Inbev, Asahi Breweries Europe Group and Molson Coors .
- Two other (ie. "non-major", or non-permanent Board member) brewing companies.
- Five regional brewing representatives appointed by the national brewing trade associations.

The chairperson of the EBC Executive Team (formerly 'committee') is the EBC President. He or she is appointed by the EBC Executive Team (by consensus or majority vote) with the appointment being subject to the approval by the Board of The Brewers of Europe. The current EBC President, Benet Fité Luís, was confirmed by the Board as the new EBC President in November 2020. The vice-president of EBC, Dr. Sandra Stelma (van Nierop), is an internal appointment.

== EBC Committees and Groups ==
Before the merger with The Brewers of Europe, EBC administered three technical committees, the Analysis Committee, the Barley and Malt Committee, and the Brewing Science Group. In 2009, the Barley and Malt Committee was disbanded and replaced by the European Raw Materials Network. Due to a shift in priorities, the ERMN was not pursued after 2016 on the basis of sharing areas of responsibilities with Euromalt (Euromalt).

=== EBC Analysis Group ===
The Analysis Group's central function is the maintenance and updating of the Analytica-EBC, a compendium of laboratory methods for the malting and brewing industry. Formerly issued in three languages (German and French, in addition to English) it is now published only in English. Until 2019, EBC's publisher for Analytica-EBC was Fachverlag Hans-Carl of Nuremberg, Germany, who used to handle order taking and shipment of all of EBC's publications via their online bookshop, Carllibri. Since 2019, Analytica-EBC access is granted through BrewUp portal, at https://brewup.eu/

After the former Institute of Brewing (now The Institute of Brewing and Distilling, London) had dissolved the IoB Analysis Committee in 1997, EBC was requested to continue incorporating and amalgamating the IoB methods with the EBC methods. As a result, many methods that had originally been IoB methods have now been incorporated, some of them have attained IM status (international method). Fruitful contacts are maintained with the American Society of Brewing Chemists (ASBC) and the Mitteleuropäische Brautechnische Analysenkommission (MEBAK), both organisations well known for issuing their own analytical methods to the beer industry.

An electronic version of the Analytica-EBC was released in 2018, and is kept being updated for subscribers via the knowledge portal of The Brewers of Europe at https://brewup.eu/

=== EBC Brewing Science Group ===
The EBC Brewing Science Group is a network of brewing scientists from breweries and academic research institutes. The membership of the group currently stands at about 60. The Brewing Science Group organises a technical meeting every two years where members have the opportunity of presenting their latest findings within an atmosphere of collegiality and confidentiality. Their meetings may be regarded as "testing ground" for papers presented at EBC congresses and other major brewing technical meetings. BSG meetings are open to professionals in the service of allied traders (industry suppliers) upon application; however, independent brewing consultants are excluded from membership. At present, the following European academic and research institutes are represented through key members in the Brewing Science Group:

- Belgium: Unité de brasserie et des industries alimentaires - Louvain Institute of Biomolecular Science and Technology (Louvain-la-Neuve), Dept. of Enzyme, Fermentation, and Brewing Technology, KUL Technologiecampus (Ghent) and Institut Meurice (Brussels)
- Czech Republic: Research Institute of Brewing and Malting (Prague)
- Denmark: Carlsberg Research Laboratory, The Scandinavian School of Brewing (both in Copenhagen)
- Finland: VTT Technical Research Centre in Finland (Espoo)
- France: IFBM - Institut Français des Boissons, de la Brasserie et de la Malterie (Vandœuvre, Nancy)
- Germany: Lehrstuhl für Brau- und Getränketechnologie, Technical University of Munich (Freising-Weihenstephan), Versuchs- und Lehranstalt für Brauerei - VLB (Berlin), TU Berlin, Brau- und Getränketechnologie, Hochschule Weihenstephan-Triesdorf (Freising)
- Ireland: Dept. of Cereal and Beverage Sciences, University College Cork
- Italy: CERB - Centro di Eccellenza per la Ricerca sulla Birra, Univ. Perugia
- Poland: Dept. of Fermentation Technology, University of Agriculture (Kraków)
- Portugal: Department of Chemistry and Biochemistry, Faculty of Science, University of Porto
- Slovakia: Brewing and Fermentation Science, Slovak Technical University (Bratislava)
- Switzerland: Labor Veritas (Zürich)
- United Kingdom: Campden BRI (Nutfield / Surrey), ICBD - International Centre for Brewing and Distilling, Heriot-Watt University (Edinburgh), Dept. of Brewing Science, Sutton-Bonington Campus (Univ. Nottingham)

=== European Raw Materials Network (also known as the European Barley Variety Network) ===
When the former Barley and Malt Committee was founded in the late 1940s most brewers were also still producing their own malt. A thorough understanding of the procurement situation was therefore tantamount. In those days, it was only EBC who organised barley variety trials and testing. These days, the larger European countries run their own testing schemes—for instance, the NIAB in the UK, or the "Berliner Programm" of the Braugerstengemeinschaft in Germany. When the former Barley & Malt Committee was dissolved in 2009, the search was on for a system that offered better cross-comparability of data in the interests of better supply chain management. The network was founded, together with EBC's sister association Euromalt, to develop a comparative platform for malting barley variety data across Europe. This involved creating an electronic platform of data comparison as well as organising trials for up to 20 promising barley varieties. The time-plan foresaw the first year of trialling to be at the end of 2013. In 2016, after EBC Internal Regulations' review, the Raw Materials Network was discontinued. Still, EBC Executive Team supports competent institutions in Europe to proceed the research on barley and other brewing cereals, as well as producing EBC Standard Malt via IFBM.

== EBC Events ==
=== EBC Congresses ===
At the first congress of the EBC which took place 1947 in Scheveningen, The Netherlands, there were only 188 delegates and the EBC archives mention that "in view of postwar economical difficulties and monetary restrictions, the expenses - including registration fees - were borne by the host country".

The 19th EBC congress (London, 1983) holds the record for the highest number of attendees: A total of 1607 delegates (including accompanying persons) attended. The 29th EBC congress (Dublin, 2003) was a milestone for EBC for two reasons: This was the first time a trade-show had been organised as part of the congress, offering the supplier industry an exhibition platform embedded in a scientific brewing conference. It was also the first time that activities between EBC were synchronised with meetings of The Brewers of Europe. The record in delegates' beer consumption is held by the 25th EBC congress (Brussels, 1995): 7,9 litres per head per delegate was consumed in the period of three days (this is excluding the beer consumed on technical tours). Noteworthy for its length was the 15th EBC congress (Nice, 1975) which took place from 9–16 May (7 days).

A list of venues and numbers of visitors of the congresses appears below.

EBC CONGRESS	LOCATION	TOTAL ATTENDEES (partners in brackets)
1 (1947)	Scheveningen (NL)	188 (partners not registered)
2 (1949)	Lucerne (CH)	327 (91)
3 (1951)	Brighton (UK)	553 (175)
4 (1953)	Nice (FR)	595 (217)
5 (1955)	Baden-Baden (DE)	963 (278)
6 (1957)	Copenhagen (DK)	849 (304)
7 (1959)	Rome (IT)	1164 (495)
8 (1961)	Vienna (AT)	1306 (535)
9 (1963)	Brussels (BE)	1352 (456)
10 (1965)	Stockholm (SE)	1209 (445)
11 (1967)	Madrid (ES)	1233 (439)
12 (1969)	Interlaken (CH)	1371 (483)
13 (1971)	Estoril (PT)	1526 (596)
14 (1973)	Salzburg (AT)	1557 (583)
15 (1975)	Nice (FR)	1331 (489)
16 (1977)	Amsterdam (NL)	1333 (461)
17 (1979)	Berlin-West (DE)	1430 (482)
18 (1981)	Copenhagen (DK)	1394 (447)
19 (1983)	London (UK)	1607 (549)
20 (1985)	Helsinki (FI)	1180 (385)
21 (1987)	Madrid (ES)	1500 (510)
22 (1989)	Zürich (CH)	1380 (405)
23 (1991)	Lisbon (PT)	1467 (439)
24 (1993)	Oslo (NO)	1164 (307)
25 (1995)	Brussels (BE)	1260 (276)
26 (1997)	Maastricht (NL)	1011 (189)
27 (1999)	Cannes (FR)	998 (225)
28 (2001)	Budapest (HU)	938 (178)
29 (2003)	Dublin (IE)	1046 (146)
30 (2005)	Prague (CZ)	973 (115)
31 (2007)	Venice (IT)	861 (121)
32 (2009)	Hamburg (DE)	637 (36)
33 (2011)	Glasgow (UK)	621 (29)
34 (2013)	Luxembourg (LU)	555 (29)
35 (2015)	Porto (PT)	462 (16)
36 (2017)	Ljubljana (SI)	512 (21)
37 (2019)	Antwerp (BE)	in conjunction with Brewers Forum
38 (2021, postponed to 2022)	Madrid (ES)	in conjunction with Brewers Forum

An EBC congress normally commences with a registration and reception event on usually the second, third or fourth Sunday in May in odd-numbered years. The three days spanning Monday until Wednesday are reserved for the technical programme of lectures and posters. These are usually displayed in the exhibition area in order to ensure a good mix of research and commercial activities. Apart from the key-note session on the Monday, most of the presentations are arranged in parallel sessions. The Thursday is reserved for technical tours: Breweries, malting plants and sometimes brewing engineering and construction firms are on the destination list.

The EBC congress is organised with the help of an agency, the Professional Congress Organiser (PCO). The official host for the congress is not EBC (who may be interpreted as licensing the congress and thereby assuring its scientific and technical excellence) but the national brewing trade association in the respective country. For Hamburg (2009) this had been the Deutscher Brauerbund, for Glasgow (2011) the British Beer and Pub Association.

The scientific output of the congress had, until 2007, always been summarised in the Congress Proceedings. Up to and including the 27th EBC congress (Cannes, 1999) the Proceedings appeared in printed form, afterwards as a CD. Due to the considerable work involved in compiling the Proceedings on the one hand, and the problem facing researchers that the Proceedings were not an acceptable peer-review journal, it was decided to eliminate these entirely, replacing them with the presentations on the congress website (or CD). However, alternative methods of capturing the learnings from a congress are currently under review.

The 2015 EBC congress (the 35th EBC Congress) took place from 24 to 28 May 2015 at the Alfândega Congress Centre, in Porto / Portugal. In 2017, the EBC congress was upon the invitation of the Association of Slovene Brewers, taking place in Ljubljana (14-18 May 2017); in 2019, the EBC congress teamed up with the Brewers Forum in Antwerp (2-5 June 2019). This was the first time that the EBC Congress had been held together with an events initiative by The Brewers of Europe, the Brewers Forum Due to the Corona restrictions in place on physical meetings, the EBC Congress earmarked for 2021 was postponed until 2022. The host will be the Spanish Brewers Association and the venue will be Madrid (29 May until 2 June 2022, at the IFEMA). The 2022 Congress in Spain will mark the 75th anniversary of the EBC, as well as the centenary celebrations of the Cerverceros de España, the brewers association of Spain. More information is available via the concurrently organised Brewers Forum.

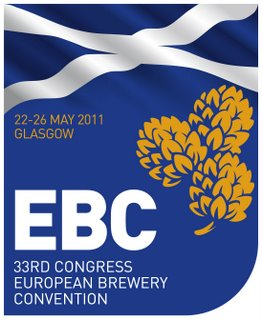
EBC 2011 Glasgow

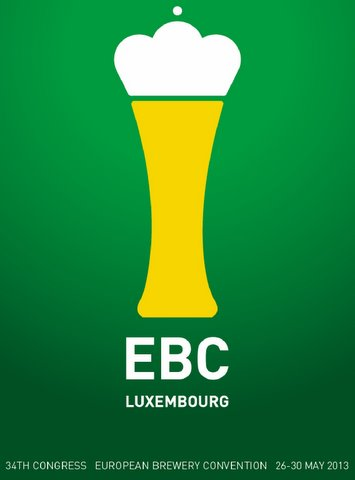
EBC 2013 Luxembourg

A sample of past EBC congress logos

=== EBC Symposia ===
An EBC Symposium is organised on a specific technical subject of interest to brewers and maltsters usually every two years (in-between congress years). In September 2010, a highly acclaimed EBC hop symposium took place at the Deutsches Hopfenmuseum in Wolnzach / Hallertau (Germany). A total of 131 delegates registered for this event. "From Chiller to Filler", a workshop type symposium on cold-bloc management, fermentation, lagering, filtration and related issues was held in Copenhagen in September 2012 (see EBC symposium website). Delegates expressed themselves positively in terms of structure, contents and organisation of this event.

The 2014 EBC Symposium was held at the Ottakringer Brauerei Events Location in Vienna / Austria, from 7–9 September, on the topic of "Sensory and technology of beer mix beverages". The 2016 EBC Symposium was hosted by the national brewing association of Poland, in September 2016, in Wroclaw. In 2018, two EBC symposia were organised: One in conjunction with the Brewers Forum, the other one a collaborative symposium hosted together with Hopsteiner and other sponsors, on the latest advances in hop science (venue Nürnberg and Spalt). No EBC Symposium could be arranged for 2020 due to the Corona pandemic; an invitation by the Italian brewers association Assobirra to host the meeting in Rome in 2023 is in planning.

== See also ==
- Beer measurement
- The Brewers of Europe
- EBC Symposium
