= Wadworth Brewery =

Brewery in Devizes, Wiltshire, England

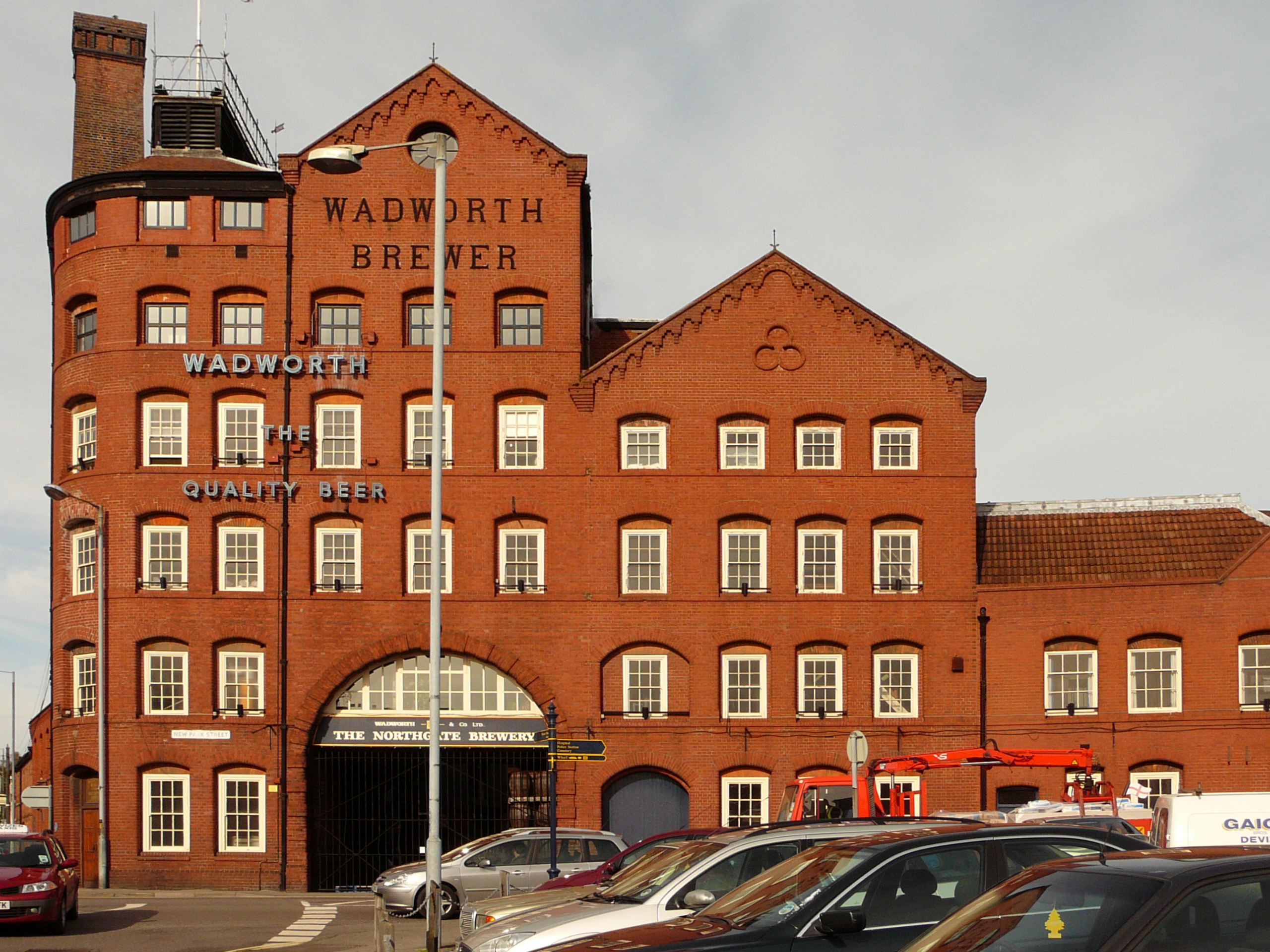
Wadworth's Brewery front facade, Devizes

Wadworth is a brewery company founded in 1875 in Devizes, Wiltshire, England, best known for their 6X beer brand.

== History ==
Wadworth & Co. was founded in 1875 when Henry Wadworth purchased the Northgate Brewery in Devizes. It was not long before they exceeded the capacity of that brewery, and in 1885 they moved premises to a new tower brewery close to their original site.

The Northgate Brewery closed in 2023 and was replaced by a new brewery at Folly Road, on the northeastern outskirts of Devizes. Plans were submitted in 2025 to redevelop the Northgate site for housing.

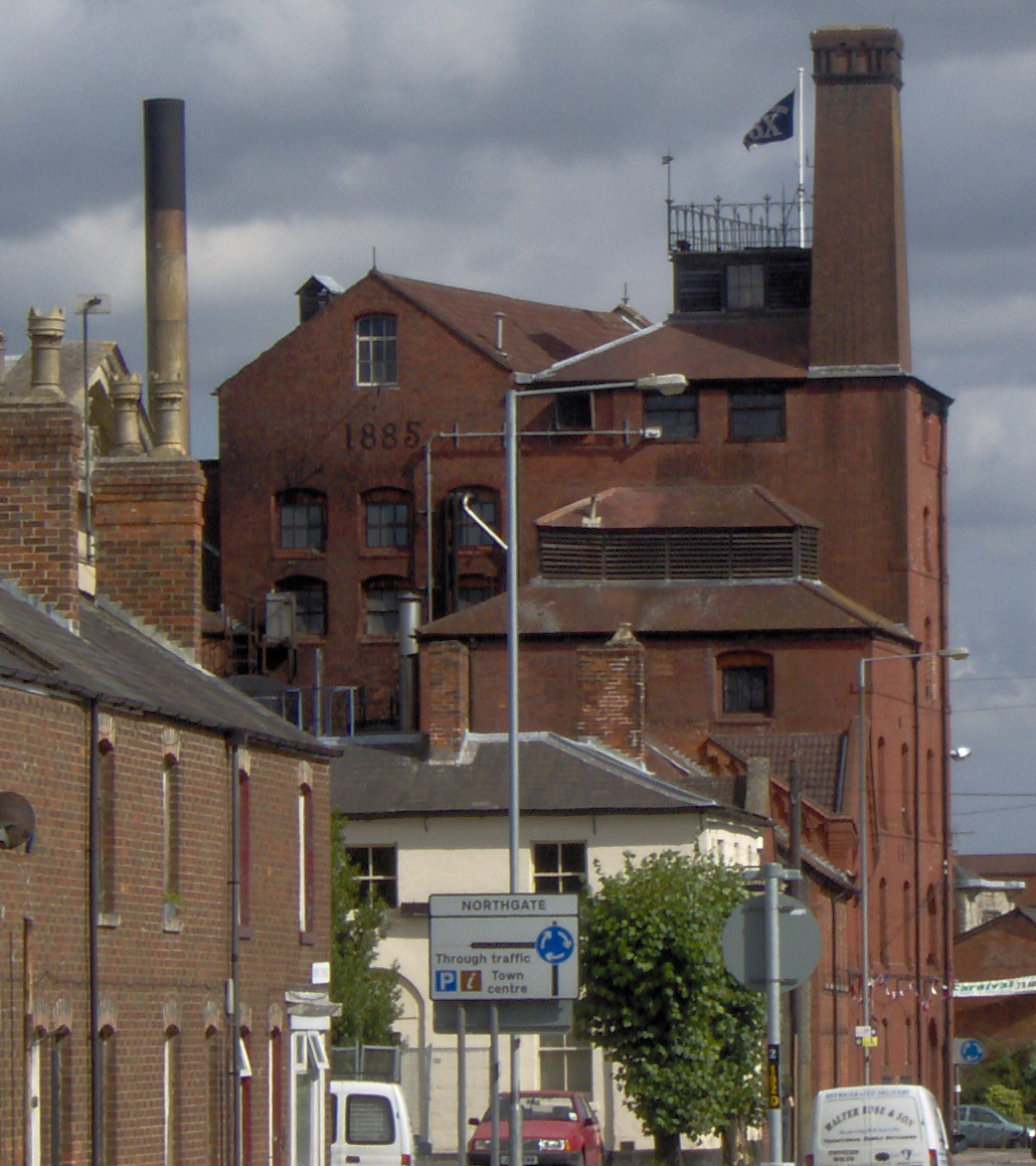
Wadworth's Brewery, Devizes

== Beers ==
While 6X is the brewer's best known beer, the company also produce other beers, including several seasonal ales.

Beers available throughout the year:

- 6X (4.1% abv on draught, 4.3% abv cans and bottles)
- Henry's Original IPA (3.6%abv)
- Horizon – Golden Ale (4.0% abv)
- Bishop's Tipple – Golden ale, full flavoured (5.0% abv on draught, 5.5% abv in bottle)
- Swordfish – A stronger version of 6X with the addition of Pusser's Navy Rum (5.0% abv)
- Corvus – A nitro keg stout available in 30L format with a chocolate & coffee taste and creamy head

Seasonal beers:

- St George & The Dragon – (March and April)
- Lily The Pink – a blend of golden beer and Angostura bitters
- Red, White & Brew – a hoppy golden beer brewed initially to commemorate the Jubilee and the Olympics (May–July)
- Farmers Glory – a traditional English ale (July and August, 4.7% abv)
- Malt & Hops – using fresh hops straight from the bine (September and October)
- Blunderbuss – a red autumn ale flavoured with elderberry (5.0% abv)
- Old Timer – winter ale (December and January)

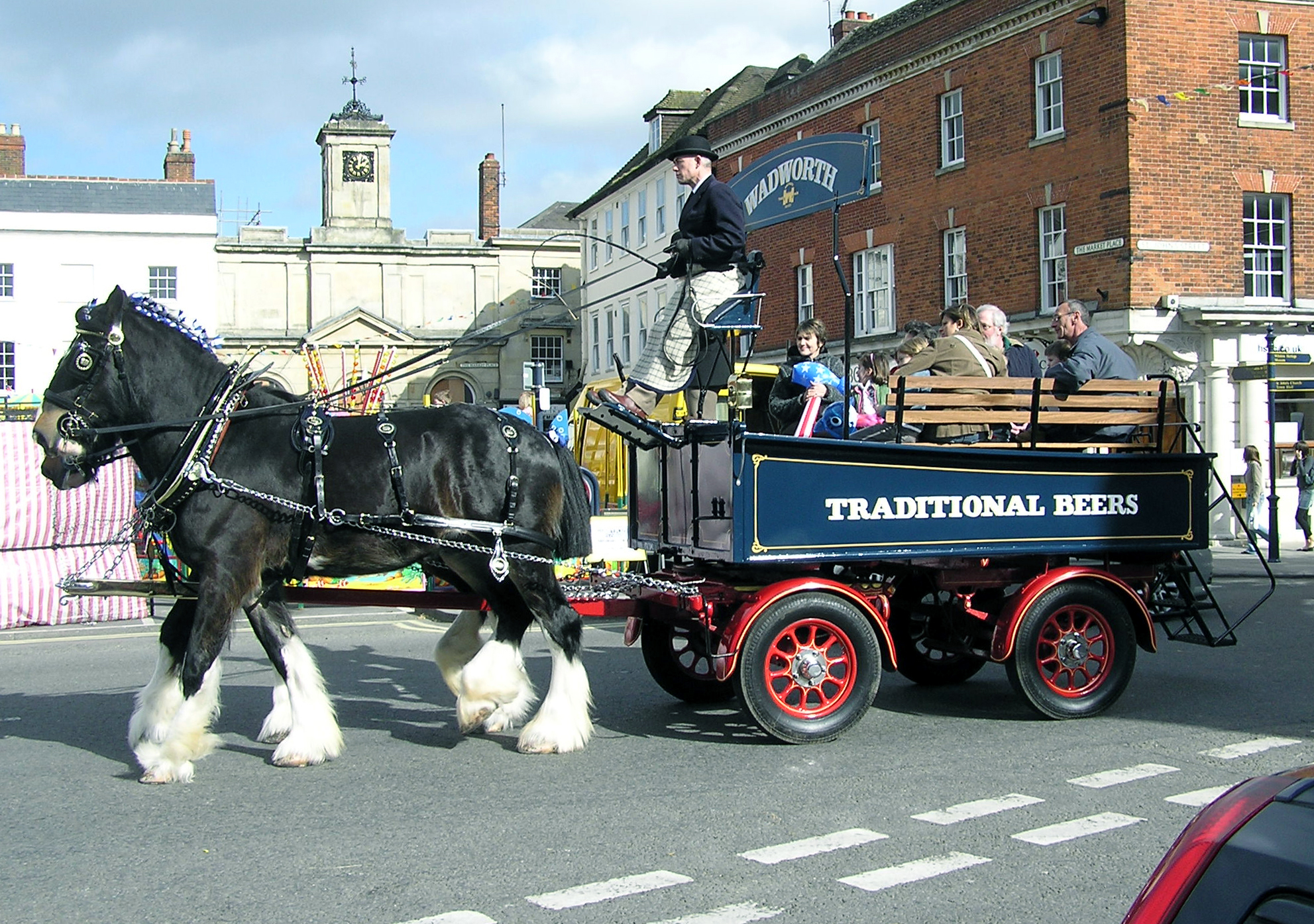
Shire horses pulling a Wadworth Brewery dray. Their normal role is to deliver beer to pubs in the Devizes area but here the public are being given a ride.

The "X" in 6X refers to a traditional grading system for strong beer; it was first brewed in 1923.

== Operations ==
Until 2025, Wadworths used traditional shire horses to deliver their casked ale to local pubs in Devizes. The ale can be delivered in metal or wooden barrels.

The brewery company used to own four horses (most recently Monty, Max and Archie and Sam) which were stabled at the brewery and were featured in television programmes such as Countryfile.

Wadworth operate a Visitor Centre and gift shop adjacent to the Three Crowns pub in Maryport Street.

== See also ==
- Society for the Preservation of Beers from the Wood
