= Hammer No More the Fingers =

Three-piece rock band from Durham, North Carolina

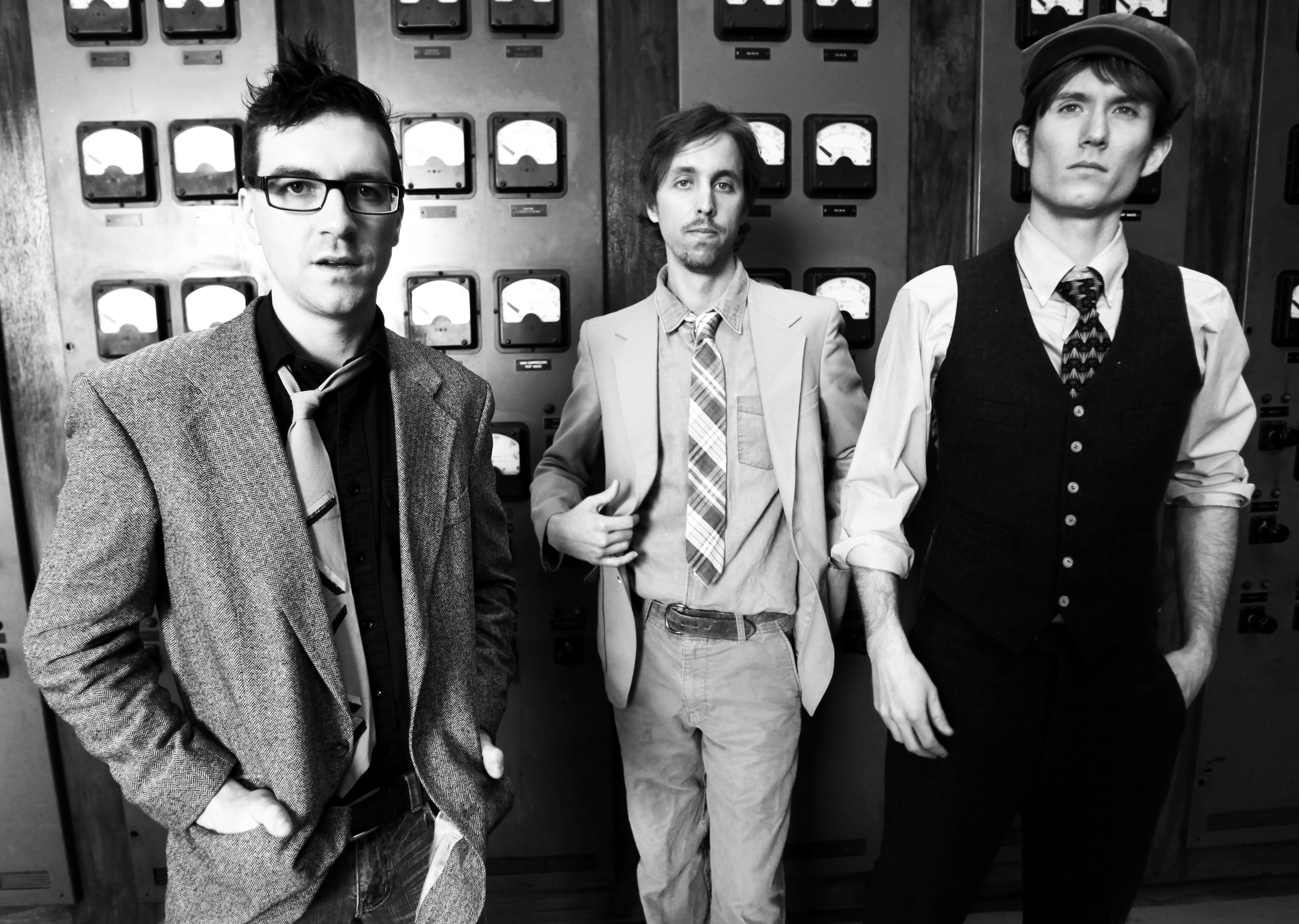

Background information
- Origin: Durham, North Carolina, U.S.
- Genre: rock
- Years active: 2007–current
- Labels: Churchkey Records; Inhaler Records
- Members: Duncan Webster; Joe Hall; Jeff Stickley
- Website: https://hnmtf.com/

Hammer No More the Fingers is a three-piece rock band from Durham, North Carolina. Formed on January 1, 2007, the band consists of Duncan Webster (vocals, bass), Joe Hall (guitar, vocals), and Jeff Stickley (drums, vocals). The band released a self-titled EP in November 2007, and issued its first full-length album Looking For Bruce on Churchkey Records in April 2009. and on Inhaler Records in February 2010.

== History ==
=== Formation ===
The members of Hammer No More the Fingers came together in early 2007 after years of playing together in various bands in Durham, North Carolina. Joe Hall and Duncan Webster had played together in The Droogies while still in high school at Durham School of the Arts. The Droogies won numerous talent shows and battle of the bands contests. Several song fragments from The Droogies have been given new life in Hammer No More the Fingers. Webster and Hall were also involved with a cult band called Slippery Chicken which, although short lived, had a respectable following. Hammer No More the Fingers was eventually formed after Joe Hall graduated from the University of North Carolina at Chapel Hill Jeff Stickley graduated from East Carolina University, and Duncan Webster moved back to Durham after a stint going to school and playing music in New York City. During his time in New York, Webster shared the stage with Flea of the Red Hot Chili Peppers and Patti Smith among other notable artists. The band began playing shows across North Carolina in 2007 and recorded a four-song demo to distribute to fans. Their first show took place at the now defunct 305 South Anti-Mall in Durham.

=== Hammer No More the Fingers EP ===
Hammer No More the Fingers released its eponymous EP on Power Team Records on November 10, 2007. The EP included seven songs, and began receiving airplay locally on 88.1 WKNC-FM. The group's CD release show at Duke Coffeehouse featured performances by several local acts, with Hammer No More the Fingers closing the night. Following what was to be the last song, the band picked up acoustic instruments and went to the center of the crowd, where they played a special encore. At the year's end, Indy Week named "O.R.G.Y." one of the Triangle's 35 Best Songs of 2007. The group continued touring throughout North Carolina and the Eastern United States, and had logged more than 150 shows by early 2009.

=== Looking For Bruce ===
Having signed with the Durham-based Churchkey Records, Hammer No More the Fingers released its first full-length album Looking For Bruce on April 7, 2009. The album was recorded in 2008 at Magpie Cage Studios in Baltimore, Maryland, with musician and producer J. Robbins of Jawbox and Burning Airlines. The band celebrated the album's release with a two-night event dubbed Viking Storm, which took place in Durham on April 3 at The Pinhook and April 4 at Duke Coffeehouse. The band also released a music video for the track "Fall Down, Play Dead", which was directed by Patrick Taylor of D dot Films.

In early 2009, Hammer No More the Fingers completed its first tour of the Midwestern United States. The band embarked on a second Midwest tour in November 2009, and continues to tour the eastern United States. In October 2009, Spin selected Hammer No More the Fingers as one of its 25 Must-Hear Artists from the 2009 CMJ Festival.

Looking For Bruce was released in the UK on February 1, 2010, by Inhaler Records. Rock Sound magazine, gave Looking For Bruce an 8 out of 10 in its February 2010 issue. The single, "Shutterbug", was played on Steve Lamacq's BBC radio show. The band embarked on its first UK tour in February 2010 to promote the release. The ten-city tour included Cambridge, Leeds, Liverpool, Swansea, Nottingham, London, Norwich, Pontefract, Sheffield and Doncaster. Hammer No More the Fingers headlined Death Disco night at the Notting Hill Arts Club in London and played to a sold-out crowd on February 10, 2010.

In an article published on March 26, 2010, The New York Times noted Hammer No More the Fingers as standout at the SXSW Music Festival.

=== Black Shark ===
In March 2010, the band returned to Magpie Cage Studios to record a new album, 'Black Shark'. The album, released in 2011, was once again released in both the U.S and Europe to critical acclaim, and the band toured both extensively to promote the album. While touring in the UK a limited edition E.P., Hammer No More the Fingers Vs Voo, was released with the two headline acts, Hammer No More the Fingers and Liverpool's Voo. The pressing was limited to 300 copies and released by Inhaler Records.

== Discography ==
Hammer No More the Fingers (2007)
Looking For Bruce (2009)
Black Shark (2011)
Hammer No More the Fingers Vs Voo (2011)
Pink Worm (2012)
Silver Zebra (2023)
