= Lewes Arms controversy =

Brewery dispute in Sussex, England

The Lewes Arms controversy was a dispute between Greene King and the regulars of the Lewes Arms pub in Lewes, East Sussex, England when the brewery withdrew from sale a popular local beer from 2006 to April 2007.

The dispute prompted a change in Greene King's policy that may well have repercussions for other pubs that have lost the right to sell local beers. One of the Greene King directors, Mark Angela, left the company amid a shake up of all Greene King houses in which the managed house operations were split into two divisions.

== Background ==
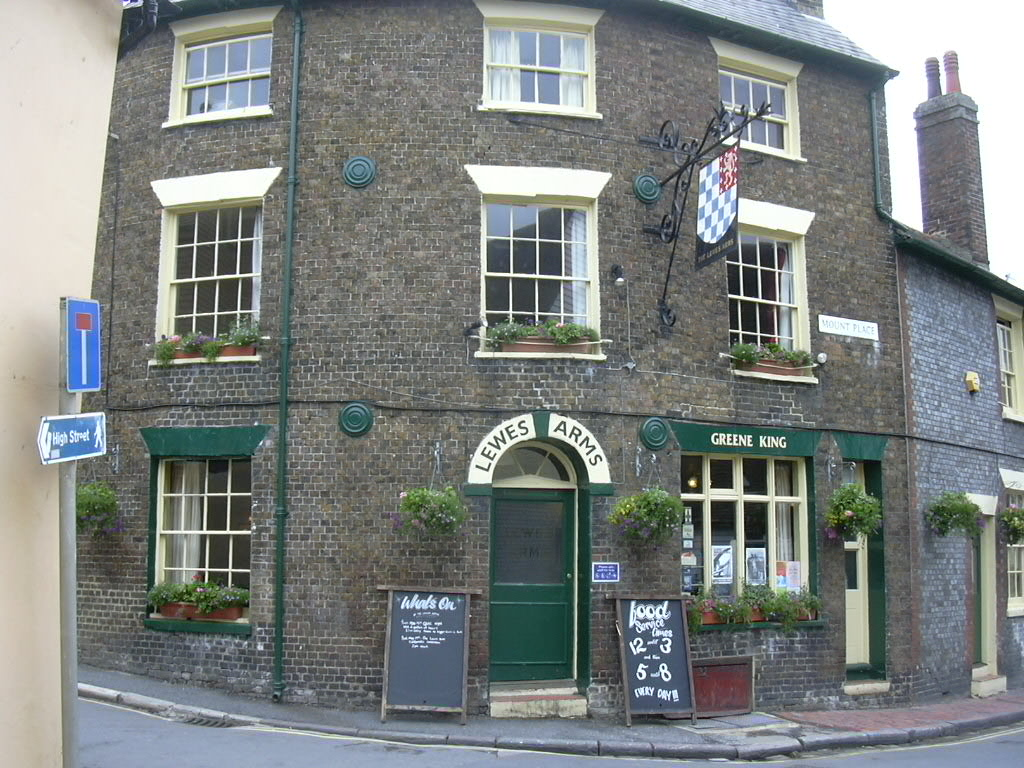
The Lewes Arms

Greene King decided to stop selling the locally produced Harvey's Sussex Best Bitter at the Lewes Arms in December 2006.

Harvey's brewery, which has been producing beer since 1790, is situated approximately half a mile from the pub and is a major local employer. The 220-year-old pub in the centre of the town had been acquired by Greene King in 1998. The seasonal Harvey's ales were withdrawn in 2004, but the Best Bitter remained on sale because of its popularity - selling four times as much as Greene King's standard cask ales. The company's decision to finally withdraw the Best Bitter turned into a public relations disaster.

== The protest ==
A petition of 1200 signatures was collected. The mayor of Lewes and the then Lewes MP Norman Baker spoke out against the withdrawal.

Following the withdrawal, the regulars of the pub staged a well-publicised boycott with a regular vigil outside the pub at peak times to explain the situation to casual visitors, which resulted in an estimated loss of trade of 90%. The campaign was covered on the internet and the licensing trade press including The Publican and the Morning Advertiser prompting a wider discussion about the power of the larger brewers over consumer choice. It gained national coverage in The Guardian, The Mail on Sunday, the Financial Times, BBC Radio 4's Today and You and Yours programmes, Private Eye, The Observer and the Evening Standard.

== Outcome ==
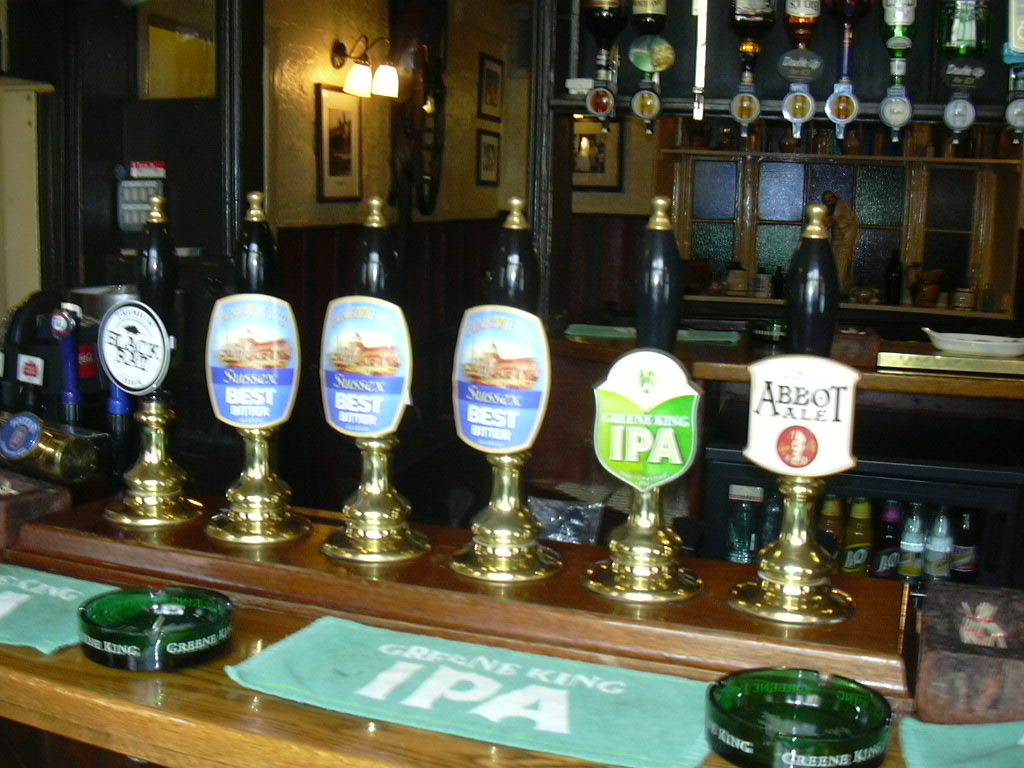
The six hand pumps inside the Lewes Arms in May 2007. Three are for Harvey's Best, two for Greene King products, and one for a cider.

After a 133-day boycott, a highly critical article in The Guardian and a corporate reorganisation in March involving the departure of Mark Angela as the head of the managed house operations, the company announced on 20 April 2007 that it would reinstate a range of Harvey's ales at the Lewes Arms. In what The Independent described as a "humiliating climbdown" chief executive Rooney Anand admitted that the company had greatly underestimated the depth of feeling about its initial decision, saying "The Lewes Arms is a very special local pub with a unique place in the life of the town ... the decision to return Harvey's to the bar is the right one". The pub is now owned by Fuller, Smith and Turner.

== See also ==
- Greene King
- Lewes
- Harvey's Brewery
