= Arkell's Brewery =

Brewery in Swindon, England

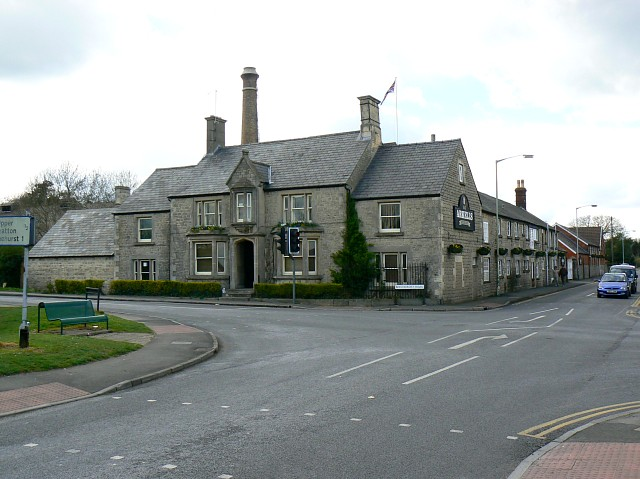
- Industry: Alcoholic beverage
- Founded: 1843
- Headquarters: Swindon, England
- Products: Beer
- Website: www.arkells.com

Arkell's Brewery was established in Swindon, England by John Arkell in 1843, and has been owned by members of the Arkell family since its establishment. It is Swindon's oldest company, built initially on the massive expansion of Swindon in the Victorian era with the arrival of the railways and the decision by Isambard Kingdom Brunel to site the Great Western Railway Works in Swindon in 1841.

== Brewery ==
Originally a steam brewery, with the engines now being powered by electricity, Arkell's is a tower brewery which works on the principle that raw materials are fed into the top of the building and beer comes out in casks at the bottom.

The brewery building is a Grade II listed building and the site has been designated an Urban Conservation Area by Swindon Borough Council.

== Distribution ==
The brewery owns 92 pubs in the Swindon area and surrounds, including locations in Oxford, Newbury, Reading, Cheltenham, Gloucester and Ascot; and sells its products to free houses in the Thames Valley and London.

In 2005, the brewery entered into a contract with rail company First Great Western to have its beer stocked in their buffet cars.

== Promotion ==
Arkell's have sponsored events at Newbury Racecourse since 1979.

The brewery has been visited by the Duke of Kent and politicians including Michael Howard and William Hague.

== House beers ==
- 3B
- Wiltshire Gold
- Kingsdown Ale
- Moonlight

Historic Beers

- 2B
- Honey Pale Ale
- Mustang Black
- Hoperation IPA
- 1843 Craft Lager

== See also ==
- Arkell, Ontario, Canada, established by John Arkell
