= Society for the Preservation of Beers from the Wood =

Organization

SPBW logo

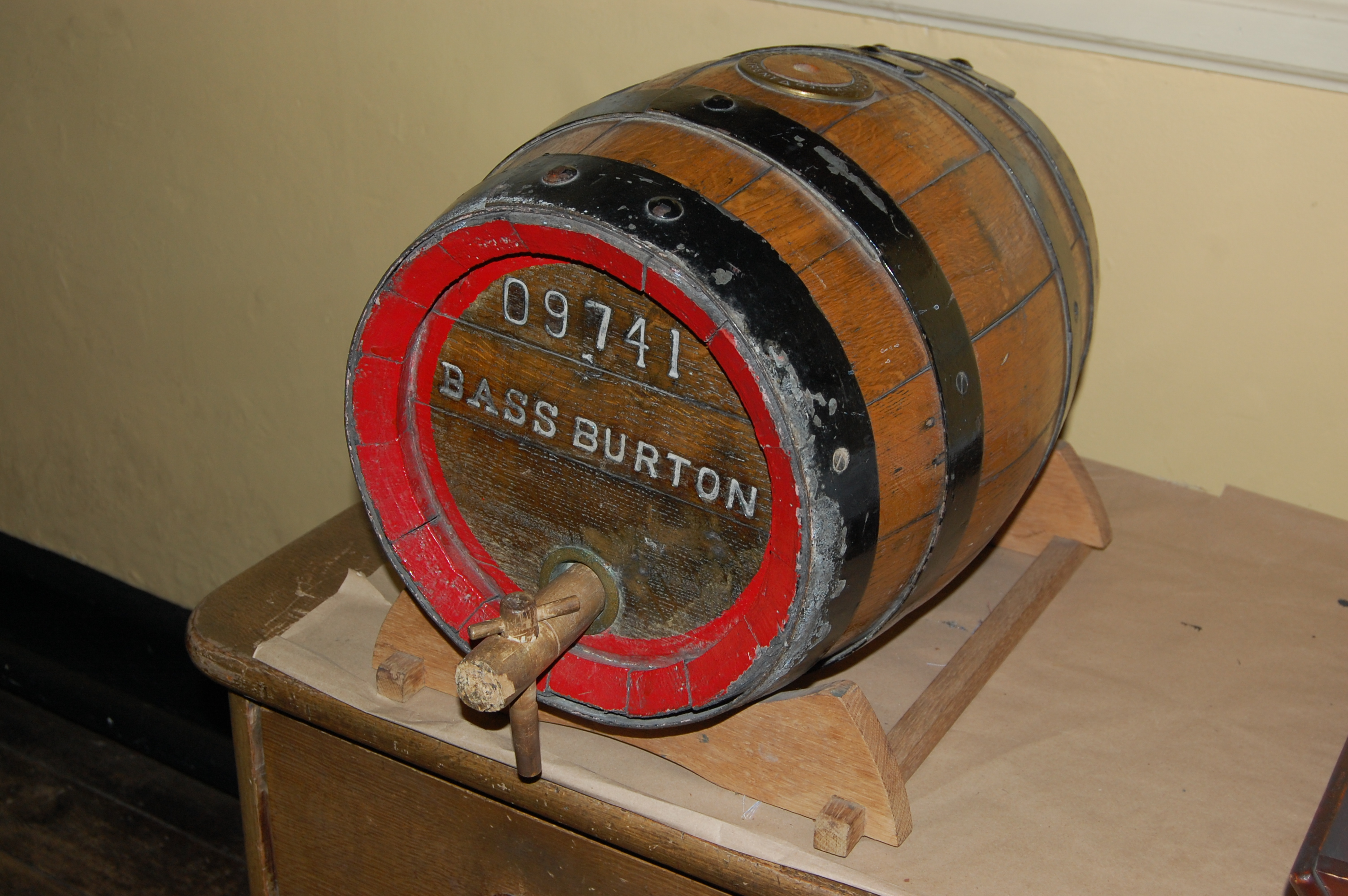
Wooden firkin from Bass Brewery, Burton upon Trent

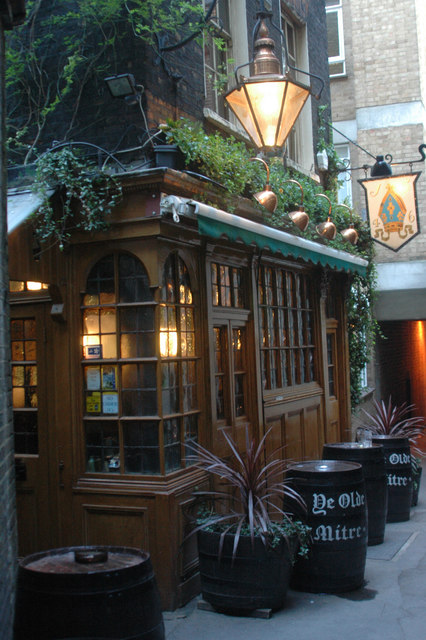
Ye Olde Mitre, the SPBW's London Pub of the Year, 2019

The Society for the Preservation of Beers from the Wood (SPBW), founded in 1963, is the oldest consumer-based group interested in stimulating the brewing of, increasing the awareness of, and encouraging the drinking of traditional cask ale. The Society also supports and encourages the use of wooden casks for beer dispense.

== History ==
The SPBW was founded on 6 December 1963 at the Rising Sun in Epsom, England out of a concern for a perceived decline in both quality and palatability of beer. This was attributed to the increasing use of gas pressure dispense and the introduction of keg beers.

Coopering once had a central and extensive role in British breweries. In 1963 oak casks were still regarded as synonymous with traditional draught beer, but as metal casks rapidly replaced wooden ones the SPBW relaxed its principles accordingly. Although the Society does not specifically campaign for the use of wooden casks for beer dispense, it supports and encourages breweries and pubs that use them and coopers that produce them.

In the 21st century there has been a revival of interest in "beer from the wood", perhaps inspired by the trend for barrel-aged beer, and this has been welcomed by the SPBW. The Society's inaugural national beer festival, "Woodfest 2017" took place in Castleford, Yorkshire in July, 2017. Breweries from across the British Isles signed up to showcase their wood-conditioned beers. Hook Norton's "Haymaker" was declared to be Champion beer of the festival.

== Aims ==
The SPBW's aims are similar to those of CAMRA, but the emphasis is on activity within its autonomous branches, which is mainly of a social nature. (CAMRA's approach has been called "more vigorous".) The SPBW's National Executive Committee maintains contact with breweries and other relevant bodies on issues of concern. It produces a quarterly magazine, Pint in Hand, and organizes an annual National Weekend.

== London Pub of the Year ==
The SPBW annually chooses a London Pub of the Year (LPOTY). The competition was launched in 1980 as a reaction to a "best London pub" competition in a London evening paper, in which beer did not seem to be a significant criterion. A blog is kept of the LPOTY scoring adventure during the run-up to the award although this lapsed for the 2018 competition.

Other branches, in particular the Northern Ireland branch, also present local Pub of the Year awards.

== British regional breweries using wooden casks ==
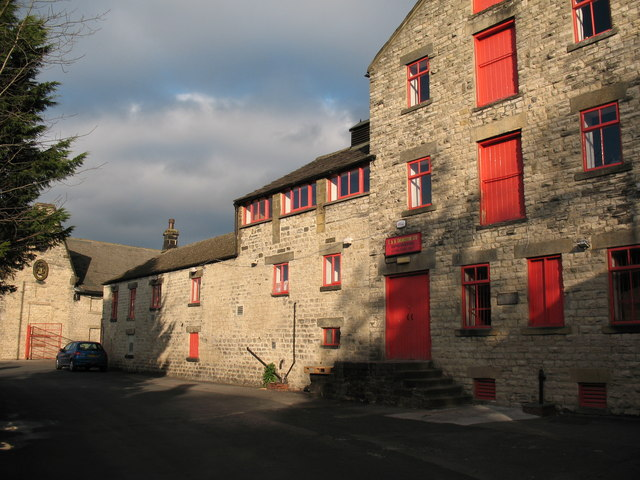
T & R Theakston
Masham

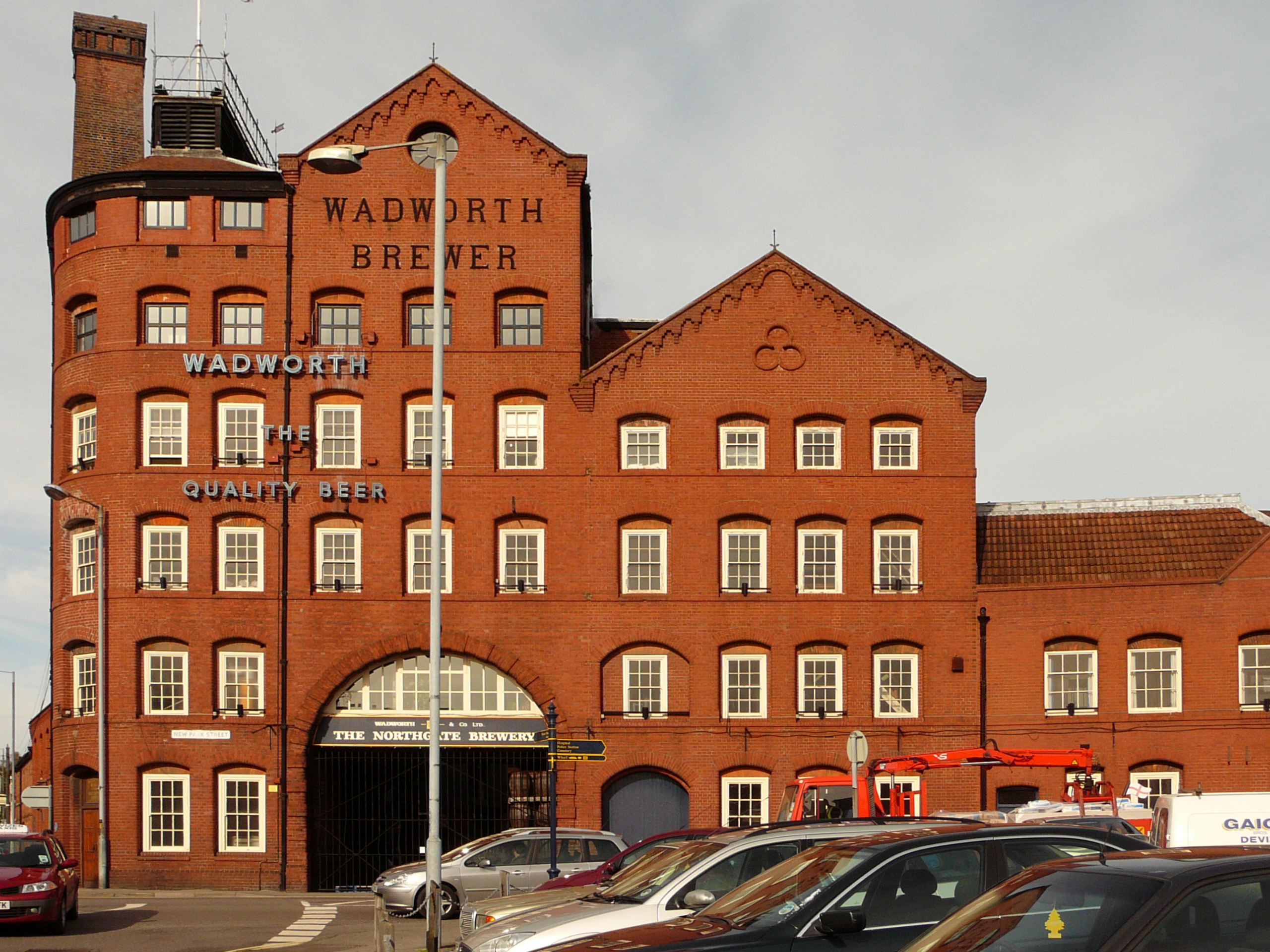
Wadworth & Co.
Devizes

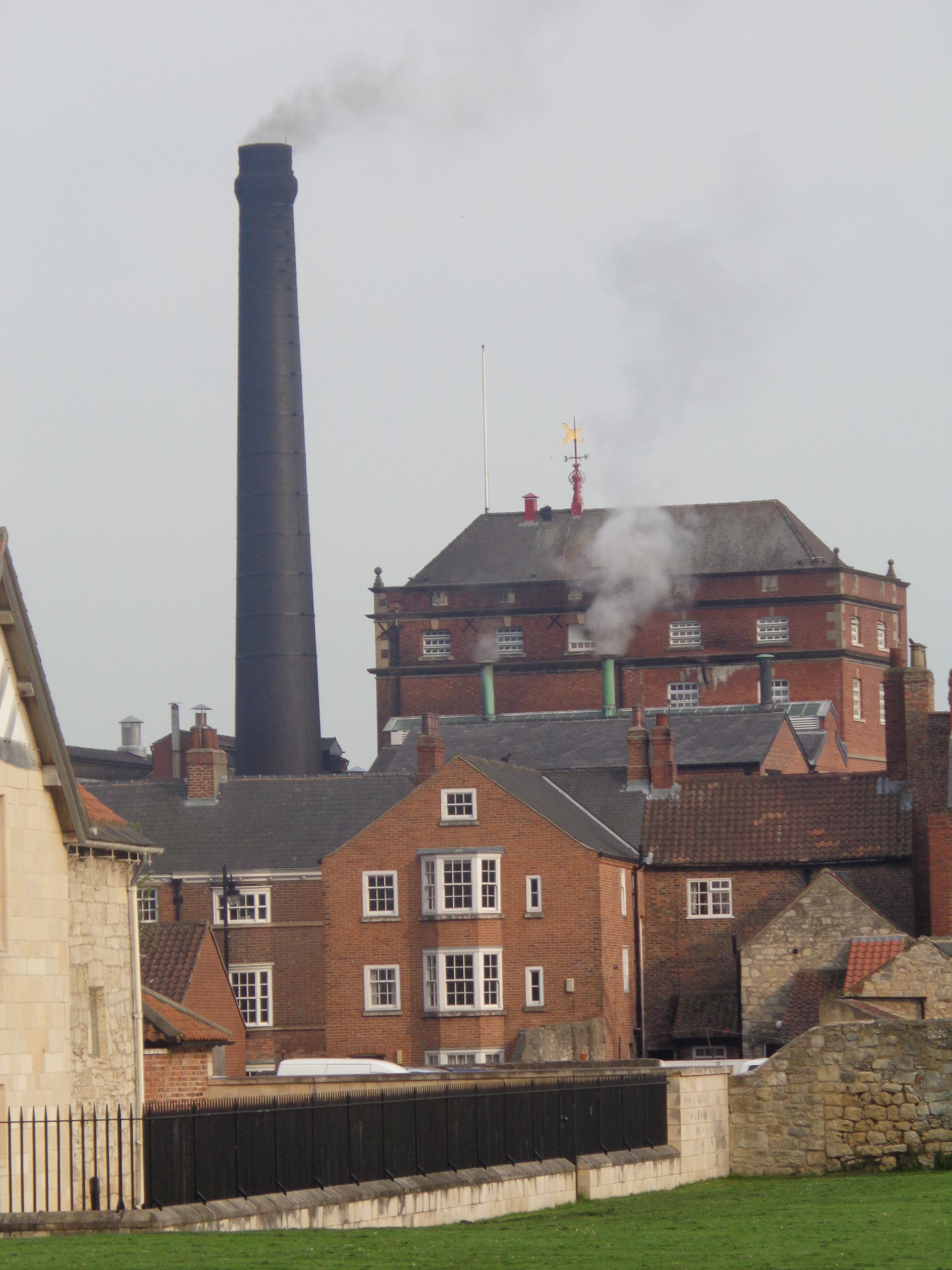
Samuel Smith's
Tadcaster

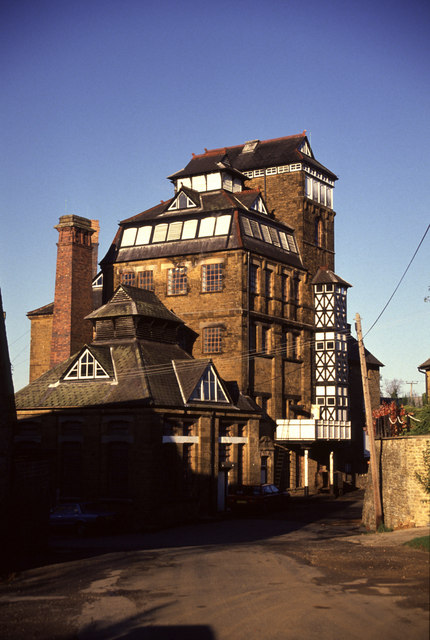
Hook Norton
Hook Norton, Oxon

== See also ==
- List of beer organisations
