= Double Barrel Benefit =

WKNC-FM's annual fundraiser

Double Barrel Benefit (DBB), is WKNC-FM's annual fundraiser that provides for two nights of music from local North Carolina–based bands. The benefit series was first organized by former General Manager Jamie Procter and held January 4–5, 2004, in Raleigh, North Carolina. The benefit changed locations for the first time in 2008, when the venue changed from Kings Barcade to The Pour House. The concert returned to the newly reopened Kings Barcade in 2011 and then returned to The Pour House in 2012. In 2014, the show split weekends and venues, holding the event at Lincoln Theatre in Raleigh and Cat's Cradle in Carrboro. The event returned to the same weekend and venue in 2017. There was no Double Barrel Benefit show held in 2021, due to the COVID-19 pandemic.

In 2011, each attendant to either night was given a CD of material from each artist that performed, with the exception of Inflowential, who had to cancel their appearance. The album featured new material from the acts, and the majority was recorded on the campus of North Carolina State University.

In 2016, during the second night of the 13th annual Double Barrel Benefit, Charlotte rapper, Baby Jesus—now known as DaBaby—had a surprise guest performance at the beginning of Deniro Farrar's set.

In 2022, Double Barrel returned to The Pour House after Kings shutdown due to the COVID-19 pandemic. WKNC returned to Kings in 2023 when the venue reopened.

Name	Date	Location	Bands: Night 1	Bands: Night 2
Double Barrel	January 4–5, 2004	Kings Barcade Raleigh, NC	Proof, The Greatest Hits, The Cartridge Family, The Pink Slips, Schooner	The Kickass, The Dynamite Brothers, Strange, Shadow of a Great Name, Sedona
Double Barrel 2	January 14–15, 2005	Kings Barcade Raleigh, NC	Kapow! Music, TV Knife, We Versus The Shark, El Boa, All Astronauts	American Aquarium, Monsonia, The Prayers & Tears of Arthur Digby Sellers, The Talk, The Fashion Brigade
Double Barrel 3	February 3–4, 2006	Kings Barcade Raleigh, NC	The Capulets, DeYarmond Edison, TV Knife, The Dynamite Brothers	A Rooster for the Masses, Cinemechanica, We vs The Shark, The Trousers
Double Barrel 4	February 2–3, 2007	Kings Barcade Raleigh, NC	The Mountain Goats, The Old Ceremony, The Prayers & Tears of Arthur Digby Sellers, Megafaun	Future Islands, TigerBearWolf, Annuals, The Nein
Double Barrel 5	February 1–2, 2008	The Pour House Raleigh, NC	Annuals, The Never, The Future Kings of Nowhere, North Elementary	Red Collar, Fin Fang Foom, Sorry About Dresden, Tooth
Double Barrel 6	February 6–7, 2009	The Pour House Raleigh, NC	Bowerbirds, Schooner, Lost in the Trees, Lonnie Walker	Polvo, Birds of Avalon, Violet Vector and the Lovely Lovelies, I Was Totally Destroying It
Double Barrel 7	February 5–6, 2010	The Pour House Raleigh, NC	Max Indian, Bellafea, Veelee, The Light Pines	Roman Candle, Spider Bags, Midtown Dickens, The Tender Fruit
Double Barrel 8	February 4–5, 2011	Kings Barcade Raleigh, NC	The Old Ceremony, Bright Young Things, Luego, Cassis Orange	Hammer No More the Fingers, Yardwork, King Mez, HaLo, Kid Future
Double Barrel 9	February 3–4, 2012	The Pour House Raleigh, NC	The Future Kings of Nowhere, Birds and Arrows, Organos, MAKE	The Kingsbury Manx, Gross Ghost, Naked Gods, Heads on Sticks
Double Barrel 10	February 1–2, 2013	The Pour House Raleigh, NC	J Kutchma and the Five Fifths, Lilac Shadows, Jenny Besetzt, The Lollipops	Spider Bags, Wesley Wolfe, Some Army, Oulipo
Double Barrel 11	February 7 & 14, 2014	Cat's Cradle Carrboro, NC & Lincoln Theatre Raleigh, NC	The Love Language, Hammer No More The Fingers, T0W3RS, GHOSTT BLLONDE	Mount Moriah, Bombadil, Loamlands, Daniel Bachman
Double Barrel 12	February 7 & 14, 2015	Lincoln Theatre Raleigh, NC & Cat's Cradle Carrboro, NC	Spider Bags, Lonnie Walker, Mac McCaughan, No Love	Eternal Summers, Elvis Depressedly, Museum Mouth, Body Games
Double Barrel 13	February 13 & 20, 2016	Kings Barcade Raleigh, NC & Cat's Cradle Carrboro, NC	Des Ark, Schooner, Museum Mouth, Naked Naps	Deniro Farrar, Professor Toon, SkyBlew, Earthly
Double Barrel 14	February 24 & 25, 2017	Kings Raleigh, NC	DJ Paypal, Ace Henderson, ZenSoFly, Sand Pact	Sarah Shook & The Disarmers, See Gulls, Astro Cowboy, Infinity Crush
Double Barrel 15	February 2 & 3, 2018	Kings Raleigh, NC	Well$, Diaspoura, Jooselord, RGB	The Future Kings of Nowhere, Pie Face Girls, The Muslims, Drugcharge
Double Barrel 16	February 1 & 2, 2019	Kings Raleigh, NC	Kate Rhudy, Max Gowan, Real Dad, Das Drip	Young Bull, M8ALLA, GRRL, Moon Racer
Double Barrel 17	February 7 & 8, 2020	Kings Raleigh, NC	Pat Junior, Dotwav Media, King Gino, Vacant Company	DE()T, Black Surfer, Junior Astronomers, Truth Club
Double Barrel 18	March 11 & 12, 2022	The Pour House Raleigh, NC	Black Haus, BANGZZ, Basura, Sweet homé	Elijah Rosario, NunAfterHours, Kenny Wavinson, Permanent
Double Barrel 19	February 3 & 4, 2023	Kings Raleigh, NC	Juxton Roy, Fading Signal, Austin Royale, Chainletter	Pictures of Vernon, KHx05, Teens in Trouble, MEGABITCH
Double Barrel 20	February 16 & 17, 2024	Kings Raleigh, NC	Saphron, Jasmyn Milan, Jiu-Jitsu, Persimmon	Jooselord, Sayurblaires, Rachel Hirsh, mxllghxst
Double Barrel 21	February 14 & 15, 2025	Kings Raleigh, NC	Boy Named Sue, applefield, Stan Y Dengy, Vivider	My Sister Maura, Carpenter / Cohen, Sk the Novelist, .memoria
Double Barrel 22	February 6 & 7, 2026	Kings Raleigh, NC	Girl Brutal, Khalil Nasim, Survival Tactics, Roxby	Petrov, Sunshower, Ajena, CJ Monet
