= Deutscher Brauer-Bund =

Deutscher Brauer-Bund e.V. ('DBB, "German Brewers Federation"), based in Berlin is "a federation of federations", in which the members are not individual brewers but only technical and regional federations of members. Deutscher Brauer-Bund is a member of the Brewers of Europe.

== History ==
The Deutscher Brauer-Bund was founded in Dresden in July 1871.

== Tasks ==
Logo of the "Don't drink and drive" campaign

- Perception and promotion of the common interests of the entire brewing economy in the Federal Republic of Germany
- Promotion of a fair and the fight of the mean competition
- Promotion of exchange of experience; in particular, in economic, legal, and technical areas
- Preservation and promotion of the good reputation of German beer and installation for the receipt Reinheitsgebot

== Members ==
=== Regional Federations ===
- Bayerischer Brauerbund e.V. (Bavarian Brewers Federation)
- Brauersozietät Mitte (Central Brewers Society)
- Sozietät Norddeutscher Brauereiverbände e.V. (Partnership of North Germans Brewery Federations)
- Süd-Westdeutsche Brauersocietät (South West German Brewers Society)
- Verband Rheinisch-Westfälischer Brauereien e.V. (Federation of Rhenish-Westphalian Breweries)

=== Professional associations ===
- Verband bayerischer Ausfuhrbrauereien e.V. (Federation of Bavarian Export Breweries)
- Verband der Ausfuhrbrauereien Nord-, West- und Südwestdeutschlands e.V. (Federation of Export Breweries of North-, West and Southwest Germany)

== The Ambassadors of Beer ==
Since the year 2002 Deutscher Brauer-Bund has appointed, on 23 April which is "the Day of German Beer", "the Ambassadors of Beer". This honor is given to people who make an unusual commitment to the day. This commitment can be, for example, an energetic and exemplary employment for the German beer or special honorary, vocational, social or political activities or trend-setting initiatives.

2017: Winfried Kretschmann; 2016: Norbert Lammert; 2015: Christian Schmidt; 2014: Sonya Kraus and Cem Özdemir; 2013: Peter Altmaier; 2012: Renate Sommer; 2011: Ina Müller and Volker Kauder; 2010: Volker Kauder	2009: Ilse Aigner; 2008: Frank-Walter Steinmeier; 2007: Horst Seehofer; 2006: Peter Harry Carstensen; 2005: Norbert Blüm; 2004: Jessica Schwarz, Peter Müller and DBB-Präsident Richard Weber; 2003: Barbara Schöneberger and Wolfgang Clement; 2002: Manuel Andrack and Dieter Hundt
