= Scandinavian School of Brewing =

Coordinates: 55°39′57″N 12°31′47″E

The Scandinavian School of Brewing (Danish: Den Skandinaviske Bryggerhøjskole I/S) is a private school, established in 1925 by the associations of breweries in Denmark, Norway, and Sweden, the Finnish association becoming co-owners in 1933. The Scandinavian School of Brewing educates brewers and brewery technicians and offers a wide range of courses for small and large breweries at home and abroad as well as to private interested in producing good beer and knowledge of beer and food, it is located at Gamle Carlsberg in Copenhagen, Denmark. The school offers a programme in English and receives many students from all over the world. In addition to its staff of regular teachers, 40 external lecturers are affiliated with the school. Courses for microbrewers have been offered since 2006.
