= Harvey's Brewery =

Brewery in East Sussex, England

Coordinates: 50°52′29.03″N 0°0′59.19″E

Harvey & Son (Lewes) Ltd.

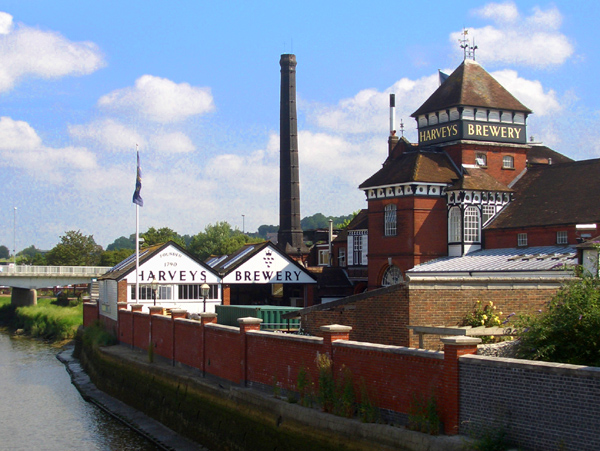
- Harvey's brewery as seen from the Cliffe Bridge
- Industry: Brewing
- Founded: 1790; 236 years ago
- Founder: John Harvey
- Headquarters: Lewes, England
- Area served: South East England
- Products: Beer
- Number of employees: 73

Harvey's Brewery is a brewery in Lewes, East Sussex, England.

Harvey's estate includes 45 tied houses, mostly in Sussex, and three in London: Royal Oak, Southwark, The Cat's Back, Wandsworth and The Phoenix, Stockwell. It sells and distributes its main product, Sussex Best Bitter, to other pubs, off-licences and social clubs in south east England. John Harvey established the Bridge Wharf Brewery on its present site by the River Ouse, overlooking Cliffe Bridge.

== History ==
In 1880, part of the original Georgian brewery was rebuilt: the tower and brew house visible for example from Cliffe Bridge. This is an example of a country brewery with a facade in a rustic neo-Gothic design of the Victorian era, a listed building at Grade II*. Behind it stands another half: the Georgian fermenting room, cellars and vat house. The fermenting room, brew house and cellars have not changed in layout and dimensions, although reinforced and their contents have evolved. The vat house was converted and expanded into the modern bottling process.

The current yeast strain was introduced in 1957 from Tadcaster Brewery, now John Smith's Brewery.

In 1984, a second brewing line was completed doubling production capacity from 25,000 to 50,000 barrels a year. The building for this plant has been added in front of the tower in a similar Gothic style, such as an arched ironwork window.

In 2016, after many years of keg beers being absent from the brewery's portfolio, a limited range of them was introduced. Also in 2016 the company made its first entry into the canned beer market with a range that included its flagship Sussex Best Bitter. Harvey's is an independent family company: Harvey & Son (Lewes) Ltd. The seventh generation of John Harvey's descendants are among directors.

=== Orthography ===
Although Harvey's Brewery had traditionally omitted an apostrophe from its name and products, the newly designed pump badge (since 2010) for its Sussex Best Bitter included one. Subsequently, individual beer badging omitted or included the apostrophe seemingly randomly. In August 2016 Harvey's launched new branding across the whole company. It was launched at the CAMRA Great British Beer Festival in that month and specifically ensured that an apostrophe was always included in every instance of the brewery's name on point of sale material, websites, glassware, advertising copy and paperwork.

At the same time a company strapline was introduced ‘We wunt be druv’ meaning 'we won't be driven'.

== Beers ==
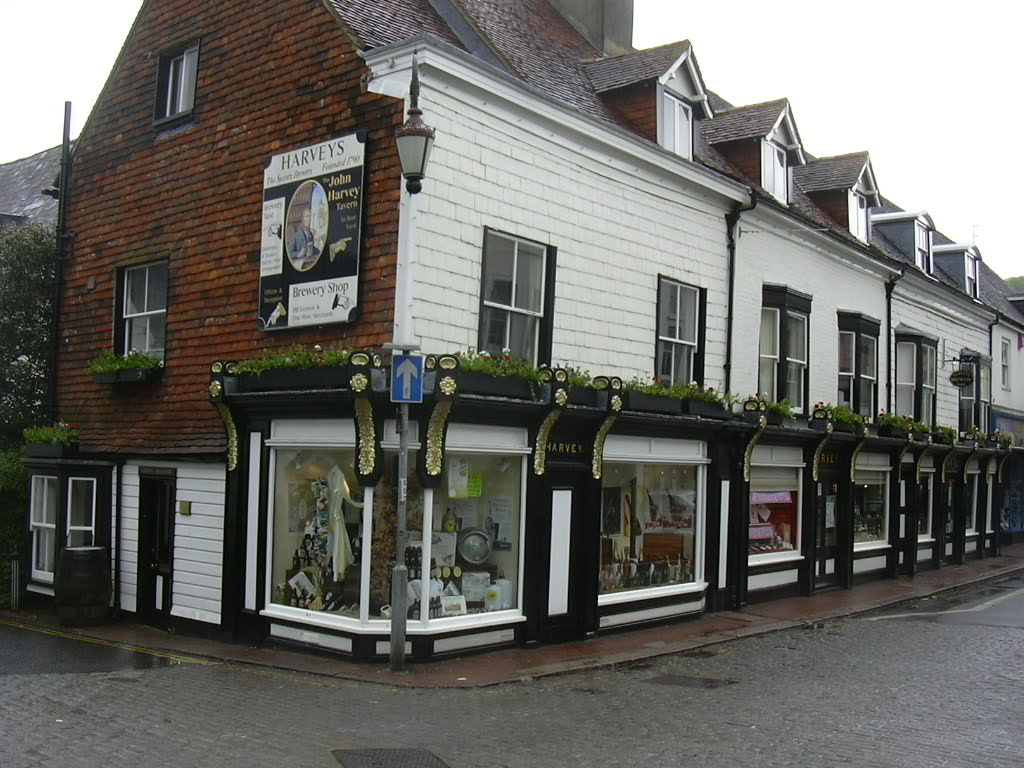
Harvey's brewery shop in Cliffe High Street, Lewes, May 2007.

Harvey's produces cask-conditioned, kegged, canned and bottled ales. In the case of cask-conditioned and bottled ales there is a range which is always available ("all-year"), and then a selection of "seasonal" ales.

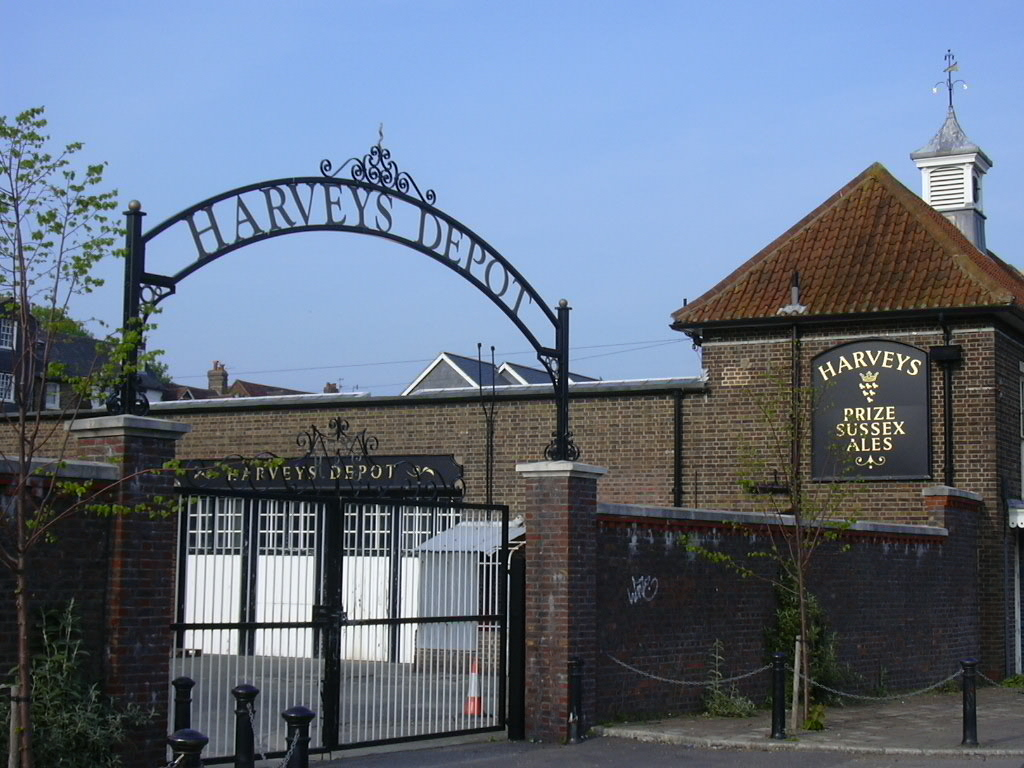
The brewery's former depot (beside Lewes railway station) in April 2007

== Awards ==
In 2005 and 2006, Harvey's Sussex Best Bitter won the Best Bitter category at the Campaign for Real Ale (CAMRA) Great British Beer Festival.

== See also ==
- Lewes Arms controversy
