= Hook Norton Brewery =

Brewery based in Hook Norton, Oxfordshire, UK

Coordinates: 51.996953°N 1.494564°W

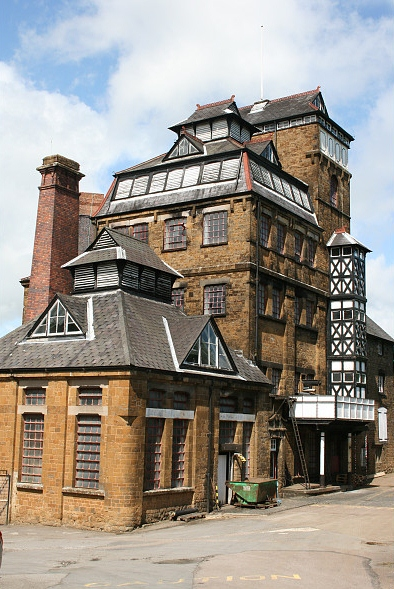
- The brewery in 2012
- Industry: Alcoholic drink
- Founded: 1849
- Headquarters: Hook Norton, Oxfordshire, United Kingdom
- Production output: Beer
- Owner: Family-owned
- Number of employees: c. 50 (as of 2014)

Hook Norton Brewery is a regional brewery in Hook Norton, Oxfordshire, England, several miles outside the Cotswold Hills. Founded in 1849, the brewing plant is a traditional Victorian 'tower' brewery in which all the stages of the brewing process flow logically from floor to floor; mashing at the top, boiling in the middle, fermentation and racking at the bottom. Until 2006, the brewing process was powered by steam. Beer is still delivered in the village by horse-drawn dray.

== History ==
The brewery was founded in 1849 in Hook Norton, Oxfordshire and was designed as a 'tower' brewery in which all the stages of the brewing process flow logically from floor to floor. Until 2006, the brewing process was powered by steam. However, the historic Victorian steam engine (dating from 1899) is still in the brewery. It is run weekly for visitors.

Beer is also still delivered in the village by horse-drawn dray.

== Beers ==
Name	ABV	Type
Hooky Mild	2.8%	Mild ale
Hooky	3.5%	Session bitter
Lion	4.0%	Golden bitter
Old Hooky	4.6%	Best bitter
Double Stout	4.8%	Stout

== Museum ==
Visitors can take a tour of the brewery, brew their own beer in the micro brewery and visit the museum with historic brewery artifacts and local history displays.

== Steam engine ==
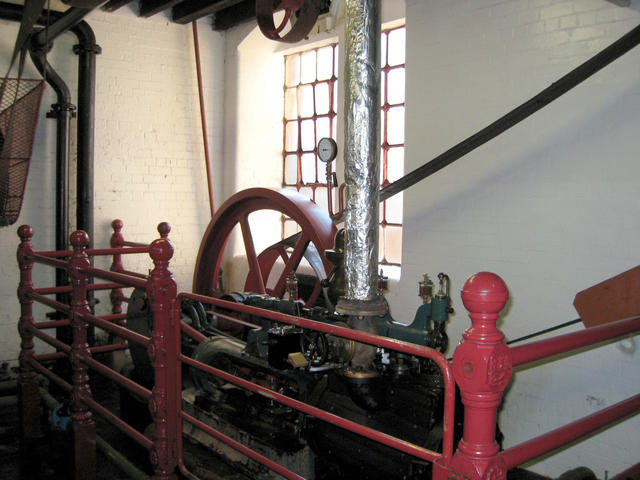
The steam engine in 2007

Hook Norton Brewery uses a Buxton & Thornley steam engine that has powered most of the machinery in the brewery since 1899. It is the last commercially working open crank stationary steam engine in the UK. It is a small, simple engine consisting of a cylinder, flywheel, connecting rods and little else. The engine drives a system of shafts and belts connected to most of the machinery in the brewery; different sections of machinery can be engaged and disengaged by levers which slide drive belts on and off their wheels. Where there are gears in the lineshafting, each pair consists of one iron and one wooden wheel. Thus, if any machinery should jam, only a few wooden teeth will be damaged and can then be replaced by the brewery's mechanics instead of needing a complex iron casting.

The machinery once powered by the steam engine includes:

- Pumps, both for "liquor" (water) and wort. The pumps are located next to the engine and are original.
- The grist mill, which crushes the grains of malt by a precisely-regulated amount. This is also an original 1899 machine.
- The mashing and raking equipment in the mash tun.
- A lift for filled casks, dating from 1900.
- The sack hoist for loading malt.

The steam engine now only powers the mashing equipment, mill and sack hoist on certain days. The mashing rakes and cask lift have been removed.

== Tied houses ==
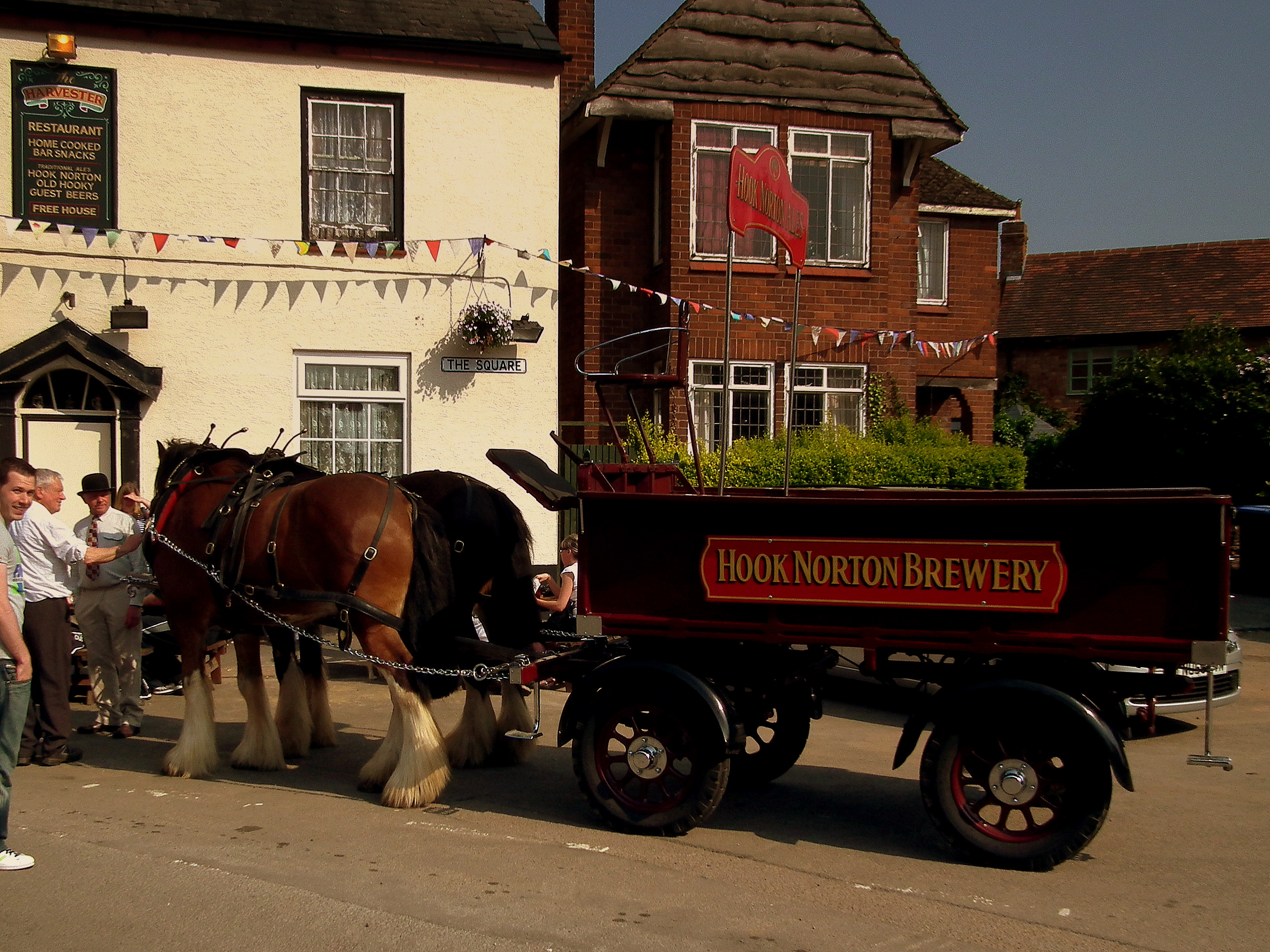
Hook Norton Brewery's horse-drawn dray at the Harvester in Long Itchington, Warwickshire, during their 2011 beer festival

Outlets for Hook Norton ales include supermarkets, off licences and free houses. The brewery also has a network of 47 tied houses spread across a region from Thame in the east to Worcester in the west and Grove in the south to Napton-on-the-Hill in the north. In total there are 23 Hook Norton pubs in Oxfordshire, nine each in Northamptonshire and Warwickshire, and three each in Gloucestershire and Worcestershire.

== See also ==
- List of breweries in England
- Museum of Oxford
- British regional breweries using wooden casks
