= Brewers of Europe =

The Brewers of Europe is a Brussels-based organisation representing national brewers' associations to the European Union. It was founded in 1958 as the "Communauté du travail des Brasseurs du Marché Commun – C.B.M.C." (Working Committee of Common Market Brewers) before becoming "Brewers of Europe" in 2001. The organisation represents the interests of more than 10,000 breweries in 29 European countries, employing more than 200,000 people and producing around 40 billion litres of beer per year. It aims to promote and protect the European brewing industry, working with policy makers and stakeholders to create a favourable regulatory environment for European brewers. The Brewers of Europe is also committed to promoting responsible beer consumption and environmental sustainability in the brewing industry. They have developed initiatives such as “BeerWisdom” which aims to encourage responsible beer consumption, “Proud to be clear” which calls the brewers to be transparent on labelling ingredients and the "Brewers Forum" which brings together European brewers to discuss key industry issues such as environmental sustainability, innovation and consumer trends. The Brewers of Europe is led by a president elected by the members of the organization for a three-year term. The current president is Lasse Aho. The organization is also supported by a Secretary General based in Brussels, which provides advice and support to the organization’s members.

== European Brewery Convention ==
Founded in 1947, the European Brewery Convention (EBC) is the scientific and technological arm of The Brewers of Europe, defining itself in terms of "facilitating knowledge creation, transfer and collaboration among partners, beer producers and academic organisations, for the benefit of the brewing sector, consumers and the community." EBC is perhaps best known for the biennial EBC Congress, a forum for scientific exchange among European and global brewers. Since 2018, that forum takes place at the same time and location as the BrewersForum. The EBC and the Brewers of Europe merged together in 2008.

== Organisation ==
The Brewers of Europe overall encourages an open dialogue between its members in relation to all issues falling under the remit of the association.

By promoting its interests and advising the EU institutions and international organisations on all aspects of policy and legislation affecting the brewing sector, The Brewers of Europe is thus able to inform the European and international institutions of its special needs and to ensure that legislative initiatives take the sector’s requirements into consideration.

The organisation represents the interests of the roughly 10000 brewers across Europe, the vast majority are small and medium-sized, local and family-run establishments. In addition, the organisation seeks to represent and defend the interests of those 2 million people across Europe whose jobs are due to beer.

== Main issues ==
Overall, The Brewers of Europe works across 5 main themes:

- Beer & Society
- Beer & Economy
- Beer Integrity
- EBC – European Brewing Convention
- Communications

== Members ==
- Austria : Verband der Brauereien Österreichs
- Belgium : Belgian Brewers
- Bulgaria : Union of Brewers in Bulgaria (UBB)
- Croatia : Association of Beer Producers (Croatian Chamber of Economy)
- Cyprus : ΣΥΝΔΕΣΜΟΣ ΖΥΘΟΠΑΡΑΓΩΓΩΝ ΚΥΠΡΟΥ - Cyprus Brewers Association
- Czechia : Český Svaz Pivovarů a Sladoven
- Denmark : Bryggeriforeningen
- Finland : Panimoliitto
- France : Brasseurs de France
- Germany : Deutscher Brauer-Bund e.V.
- Greece : Hellenic Association of Brewers
- Hungary : Magyar Sörgyártók Szövetsége
- Ireland : Irish Brewers Association
- Italy : Assobirra - Associazione dei Birrai e dei Maltatori
- Lithuania : Lietuvos aludarių gildija
- Luxembourg : Confédération des Brasseries et des Brasseurs du Luxembourg (C.B.B.L.)
- Malta : The Malta Chamber of Commerce, Enterprise and Industry
- Norway : Bryggeri- og drikkevareforeningen (BROD)
- Poland : Związek Pracodawców Przemysłu Piwowarskiego w Polsce – Browary Polskie
- Portugal : Cervejeiros de Portugal
- Romania : Asociatia Berarii Romaniei
- Slovakia : Slovenské Združenie Výrobcov Piva a Sladu
- Slovenia : Chamber of Commerce and Industry of Slovenia, Chamber of Agricultural and Food Entreprises, Association of Slovene Brewers
- Spain : Cerveceros de España
- Sweden : Sveriges Bryggerier AB
- Switzerland : Schweizer Brauerei-Verband
- The Nederlands : Nederlandse Brouwers
- Türkiye : Bira ve Malt Üreticileri Derneği (BMÜD)
- United Kingdom : British Beer and Pub Association
