= WKNC-FM =

Radio station at North Carolina State University

- Raleigh, North Carolina; United States
- Broadcast area: Raleigh-Durham, North Carolina
- Frequency: 88.1 (MHz) (HD Radio)

Programming
- Format: Indie rock, electronic, hip-hop, heavy metal, and jazz
- Subchannels: HD2: Indie rock, electronic, hip-hop, heavy metal, and jazz; HD3: Dance music

Ownership
- Owner: North Carolina State University

History
- First air date: October 9, 1966 (at 88.1 FM)
- Former call signs: WLAC (1922-1923) WOLF-WNCS (1944-1947) WVWP (1947-1958) WKNC (1958-1966)
- Call sign meaning: North Carolina

Technical information
- Licensing authority: FCC
- Facility ID: 49160
- Class: C3
- Power: 25,000 watts
- HAAT: 80 meters (260 ft)
- Transmitter coordinates: 35°47′15.5″N 78°40′13″W

Links
- Public license information: Public file; LMS
- Webcast: www.wknc.org/listen
- Website: www.wknc.org

WKNC-FM (88.1 FM) is North Carolina State University's student-run, non-commercial college radio station broadcasting from Raleigh, North Carolina in the United States. Broadcasting with an effective radiated power of 25,000 watts, its signal covers much of the Research Triangle and outlying areas. The station is operated as part of the Department of Student Media at N.C. State and students hold all roles from DJ to general manager. The primary weekday format is indie rock, with specialty shows and other music genres featured during the evenings and weekends.

== Programming ==
WKNC HD-1 and HD-2 are classified as a variety radio station by Nielsen Audio, providing block programming divided into five formats: Daytime Rock (primarily indie rock), Afterhours (electronic), Underground (hip-hop), Chainsaw Rock (heavy metal), and Sunset (jazz). The "Local Lunch" airs weekdays from 12 to 1 p.m. on HD-1 and from 1 to 2 p.m. on HD-2, during which only North Carolina artists are played.

Like many non-commercial stations, WKNC airs specialty shows. Past specialty shows have included Geet Bazaar (South Asian music from India, Pakistan, Bangladesh, and others) and Both Kinds Radio (classic country and western swing). Other specialty music genres have included soul and R&B, A cappella, punk rock, post-rock, psychedelic, emo, jazz, Americana, classical music, ska, grunge, dance, funk, blues, K-pop, jam band, beach music, world music, video game music, and Vocaloid music.

WKNC produces a weekly public affairs show called "Eye on the Triangle," which focuses on current events and culture in the Research Triangle. The station also broadcasts all NC State Wolfpack women's basketball games and NC State Wolfpack baseball from Learfield IMG College.

Audio podcasts of "Eye on the Triangle," WKNC interviews and other podcasts are available via iTunes, Spotify and everywhere else podcasts are found.

Each year since 2004, WKNC also holds a benefit concert named the Double Barrel Benefit. The two-night concert series bring in North Carolina based bands in order to raise additional funds for the station.

== History ==
=== WLAC (1922–1923) ===
- August 31, 1922 – WLAC was licensed to North Carolina State College as the third broadcasting station in North Carolina and the first in Raleigh. An AM station, it was assigned to transmit on the standard "entertainment" wavelength of 360 meters (833 kHz). The call letters were randomly assigned from a sequential list of available call signs.
- October 16, 1922 – WLAC's debut broadcast featured guest speakers making short speeches, which included Josephus Daniels, former secretary of the U.S. Navy and owner of the Raleigh News & Observer, optimistically predicting: "...radio, making it impossible forever for surprise attack in war, and making it possible for New York and Tokio to be neighbors in peace, brings the world to the door of unmolested peace that comes with acquaintance".
- October 29, 1923 – WLAC was removed from the government records after its license was not renewed.

=== WOLF/WNCS (1944–1947) ===
- January 1944 – A group of engineering students, led by Harris Wroton, establish a carrier current station for on-campus listeners. This class of station does not need a license or receive official call letters, but it adopted the self-selected identifier of WOLF (the mascot of NC State is the Wolfpack).
- 1945 – The station's identifier was changed to WNCS (W-North Carolina State) 570 AM
- November 1946 – WNCS is recognized by the Student Publications Authority. With university support, a permanent home for the station was established on campus.

=== WVWP (1947–1958) ===
- Summer 1947 – The carrier current station identity was changed to WVWP (W-Voice of the Wolf Pack) 580 AM.
- 1948 – WVWP broadcasts all home men's basketball games from Frank Thompson Gymnasium.
- Fall 1951 – WVWP adds a second transmitter on 560 AM.
- April 1952 – FCC shut down WVWP's transmitter on 560 AM for signal over-radiation.
- March 1954 – WVWP broadcasts the first ACC basketball tournament from NC State's Reynolds Coliseum.

=== WKNC-AM (1958–1966) ===
- Summer 1958 – A final carrier current station identity change from WVWP to WKNC 580 AM.
- December 1959 – WKNC installs a satellite transmitter at Peace College in Raleigh
- February 1960 – WKNC and carrier current station WDBS at Duke University form intercollegiate radio network. The two stations worked together to broadcast coverage of the Republication State Convention in Raleigh.
- December 1960 – WKNC develops a rudimentary automation system that allows up to five hours of pre-recorded broadcasting
- 1962 – WKNC and the other student publications move their offices from the 1911 Building to the basement of the King Religious Center (formerly the YMCA Building). The building was torn down in 1975.
- November 1963 – WKNC moves from 580 to 600 kHz.
- February 1964 – The Student Publications Board votes to change the positions of Technician and Agromeck editor and WKNC manager from elected to being hired by the Student Publications Board

=== WKNC-FM/WPAK-AM (1966–1971) ===
- October 9, 1966 – WKNC 580 AM adds a licensed non-commercial partner, WKNC 88.1 FM, whose 10-watt transmitter expanded the coverage area from on-campus residence halls to much of the surrounding city. WKNC aired a mix of folk, jazz, and classical music at the time.
- April 1, 1968 – After a student survey showed only about half of students had an FM radio, a carrier current station identifying as WPAK signs on over 600 kHz. WPAK was on the air until 1971.
- 1970 – WKNC begins airing Wolfpack baseball on 88.1 FM.
- November 1970 – WKNC expands broadcasting day to 20.5 hours Monday through Friday, beginning at 9 a.m. "Through the addition of a simple automation system, we are now able to broadcast between the hours of 9 a.m. and 6 p.m. in addition to our regular schedule," General Manager Fred Plunkett told the Technician.

=== WKNC-FM (1972–2015) ===
- Summer 1972 – Student publications offices, including Technician, Agromeck and WKNC-FM, move to new University Student Center (now called Talley Student Union). A tower for WKNC was built at the D.H. Hill Library, expanding reception of the station to around 25 miles.
- January 1974 – WKNC launches "The Music Makers", a locally produced 10-week series was hosted by Robert Starling. Starling told the technician the program would "try to bring out the things people don’t know about [local] musicians."
- November 1976 – WKNC forms North Carolina University Radio Network. Approximately 30 students from WKNC, WSHA at Shaw University, WUAG at University of North Carolina at Greensboro, WECU at East Carolina University, and WASU at Appalachian State University worked together to provide election results throughout the evening.
- 1976–1977 – Transmitter power increased to 1,000 watts. Format changed to a progressive rock style, but continued to feature top-40, jazz, and soul.
- November 1979 – WKNC broadcasts its first women's basketball game.
- early 1980s – The station known as Rock 88, moved into a hard rock/heavy metal format and gained praise as one of the top college stations in the nation.
- 1981 – WKNC launches paid sponsorship. Early underwriters included University Food Services and Silver Bullet Saloon.
- 1984 – Effective Radiated Power increased from 1,000 to 3,000 watts, expanding coverage to a 40-mile radius. An 80-foot self-supporting tower replaced the guyed mast.
- March 9, 1991 – WKNC signs on from its new facilities in the Student Center Annex (later named the Witherspoon Student Center).
- April 1998 – The format changed from a hard rock format to a wider blend of music focusing on independent and non-top-40 artists.
- August 1998 – WKNC began its webcast.
- October 2003 – Effective Radiated Power increased to 25,000 watts, making WKNC one of the top 10 college radio stations in America in terms of wattage and signal reach.
- January 16–17, 2004 – The first Double Barrel Benefit fundraiser takes place.
- April 1, 2007 – WKNC launches its first podcast, "88.1 Seconds of Technician" in partnership with Technician newspaper.
- September 2009 – WKNC launches its Fridays on the Lawn on-campus concert series.
- 2010 – WKNC launches its first podcast exclusive program "SoundOff."
- 2013 – WKNC launches "WKNC’s The Lounge" YouTube channel.
- 2015 – February 2015 – WKNC publishes its first zine, "Bad Words (And Other Things You Can’t Say on the Radio)."

=== WKNC-FM HD1/HD2 (2016–present) ===
- 2016 – WKNC reconfigures its antenna pattern to increase the signal coverage and expands non-indie rock programming.
- October 9, 2016 – Broadcasting begins in HD Radio to commemorate the station's 50th anniversary at 88.1 FM.
- January 9, 2019 – WKNC launches an HD2 subchannel with heavy metal, hip-hop and electronic music programmed during daytime hours.
- May 3, 2019 – WolfBytes Radio begins leasing WKNC's HD3 subchannel, programming a dance music format.

== Notable alumni ==
- John Tesh, nationally syndicated radio host, TV host and musician
- Zach Galifianakis, actor and comedian
- John Davis, host of public television program MotorWeek
