= List of breweries in England =

This is a partial list of breweries in England. Beer in England pre-dates other alcoholic drinks produced in England, and has been brewed continuously since prehistoric times. As a beer brewing country, England is known for its top fermented cask beer (also called real ale) which finishes maturing in the cellar of the pub rather than at the brewery and is served with only natural carbonation. Modern developments include consolidation of large brewers into multinational corporations; growth of beer consumerism; expansion of microbreweries and increased interest in bottle conditioned beers.

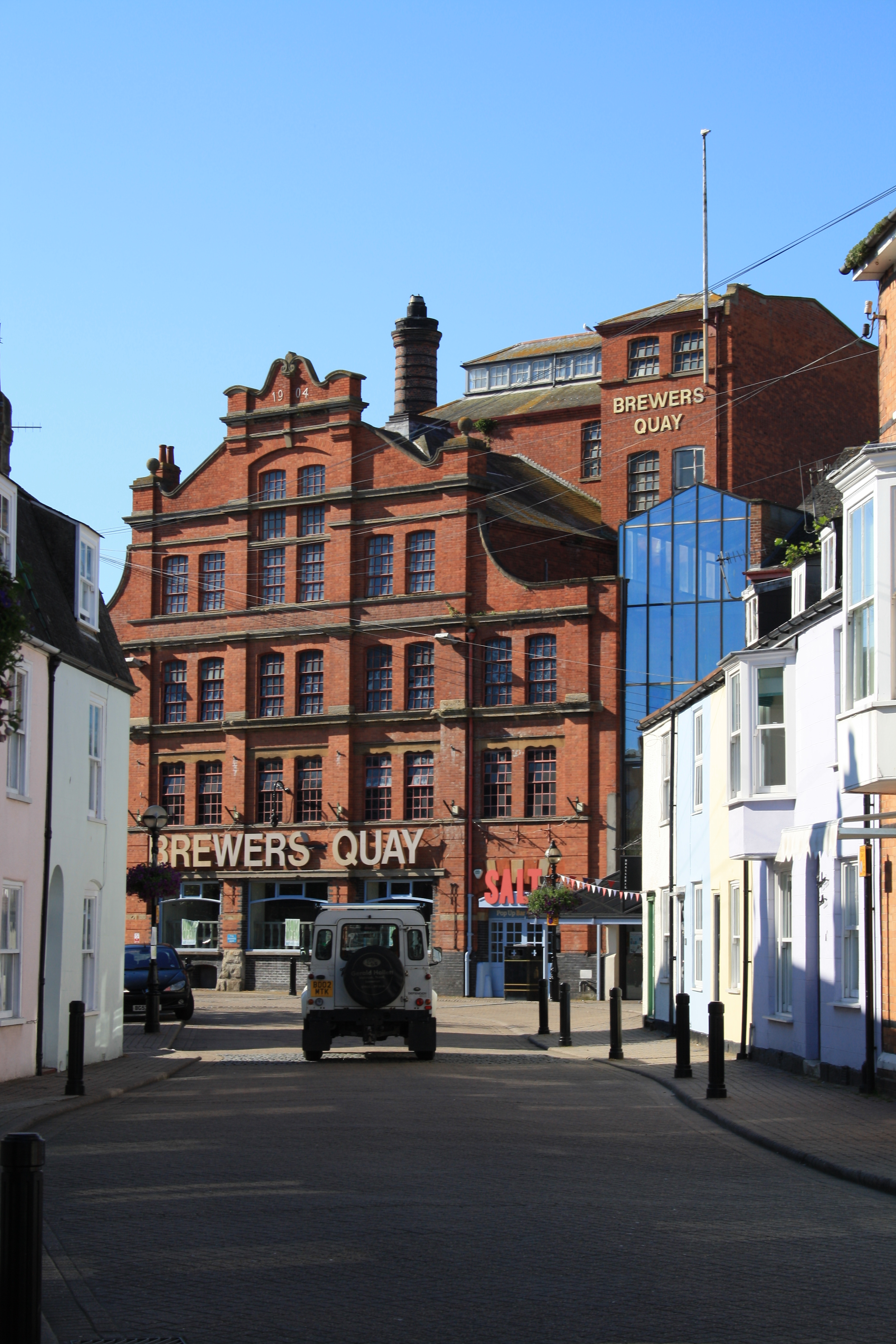
Brewers Quay, Weymouth, Dorset, 2013

In 2000, there were around 500 breweries in the UK, while the 2015 edition of the Good Beer Guide listed 1,285 breweries operating in Britain. A 2015 government analysis found that a new brewery was opening in Britain every other day, with Britain becoming a 'brewing powerhouse'.

By 2020, the number of breweries had increased rapidly, and the Good Beer Guide lists 1,850 breweries.

== Breweries in England ==
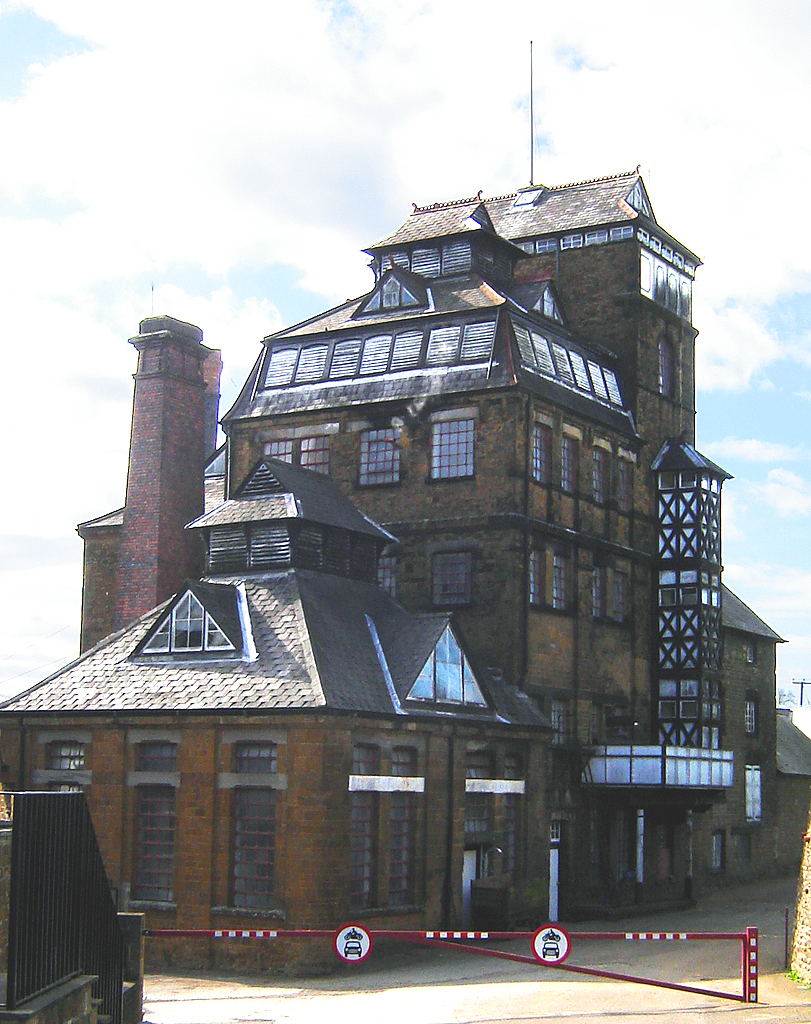
Hook Norton Brewery is one of the last surviving Victorian breweries in the UK. (April 2006).

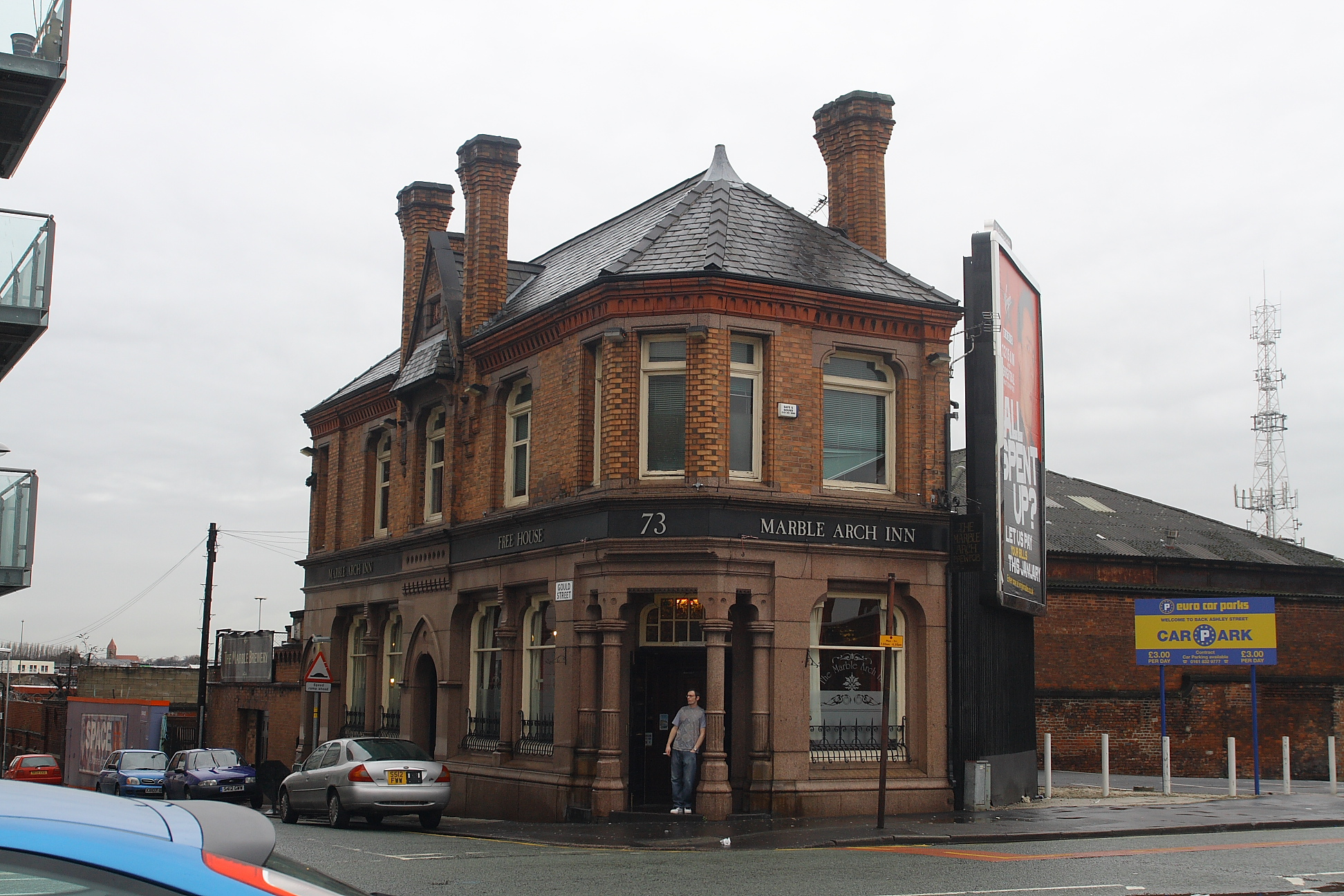
The Marble Arch Inn, home of the Marble Brewery in Manchester

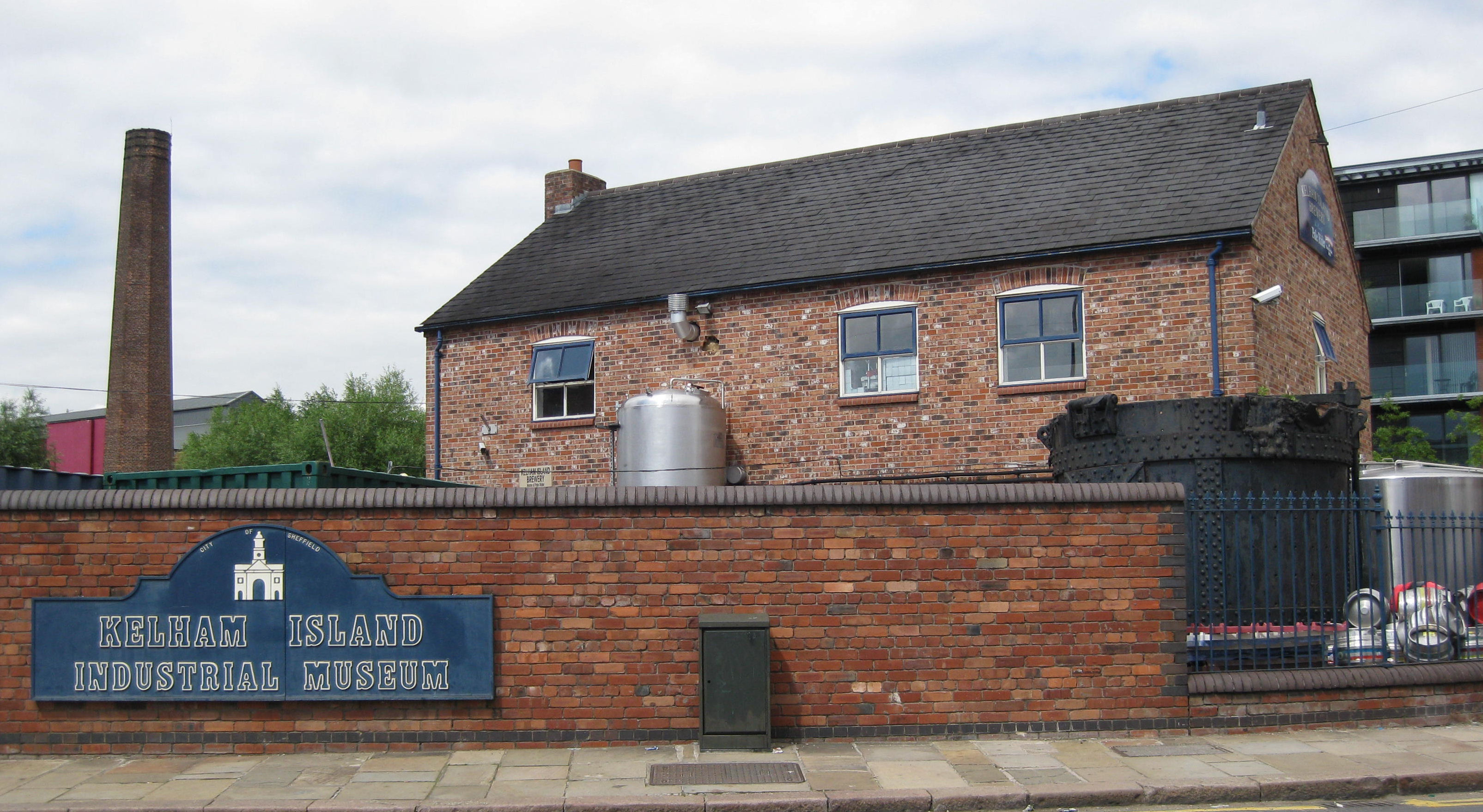
Kelham Island Brewery in Sheffield

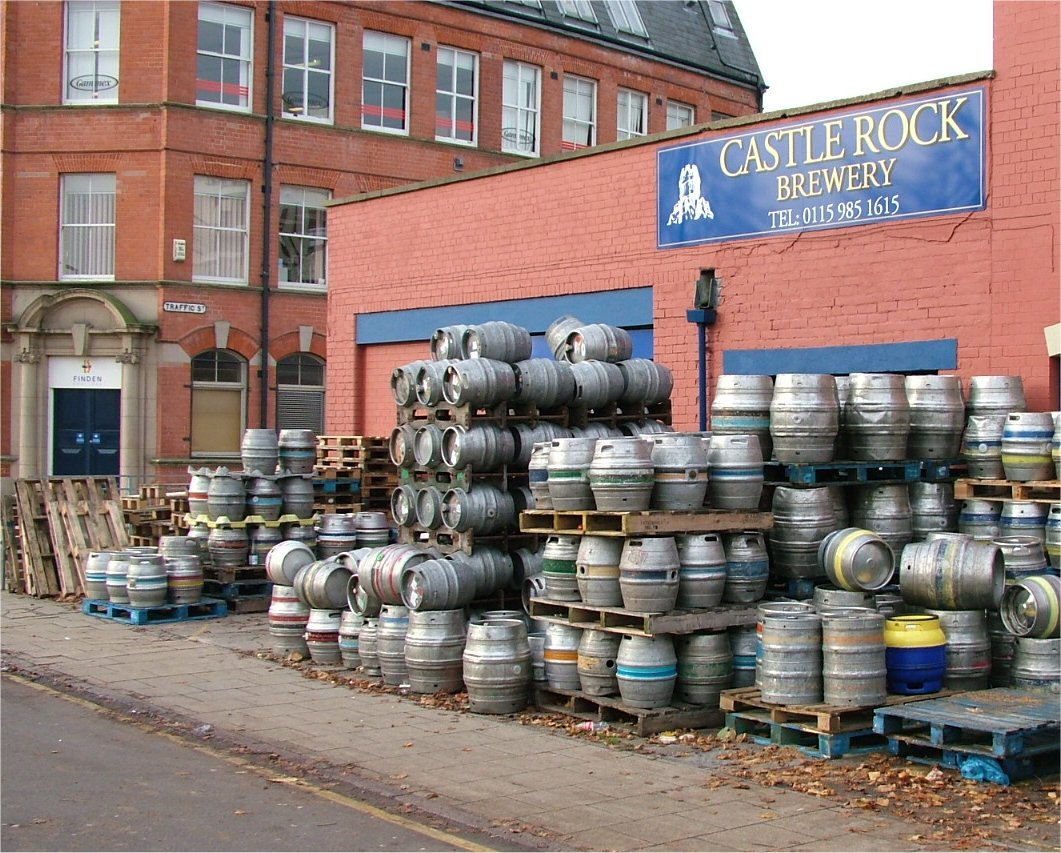
Firkins outside the Castle Rock microbrewery in Nottingham

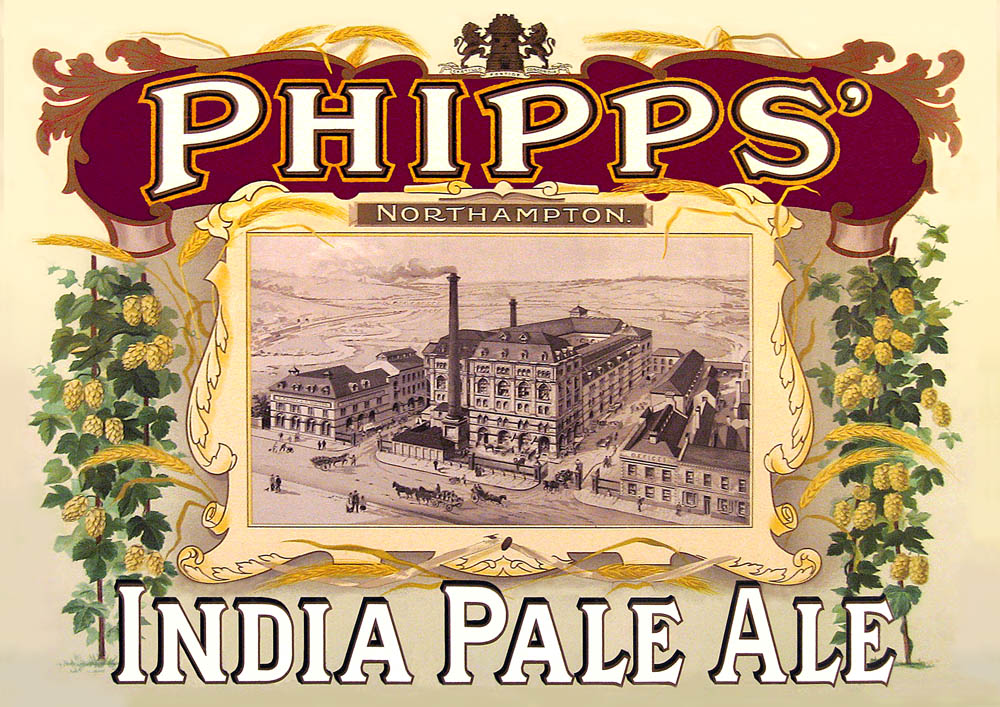
A 19th-century poster for Phipps India Pale Ale (IPA) showing the Northampton Brewery on Bridge Street, now the site of Carlsberg UK

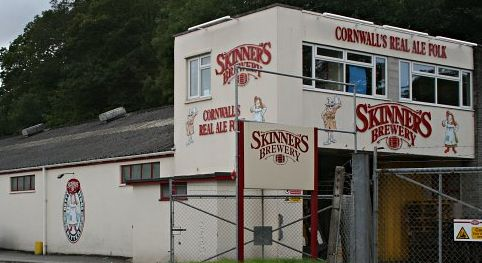
Skinner's Brewery, Truro, Cornwall

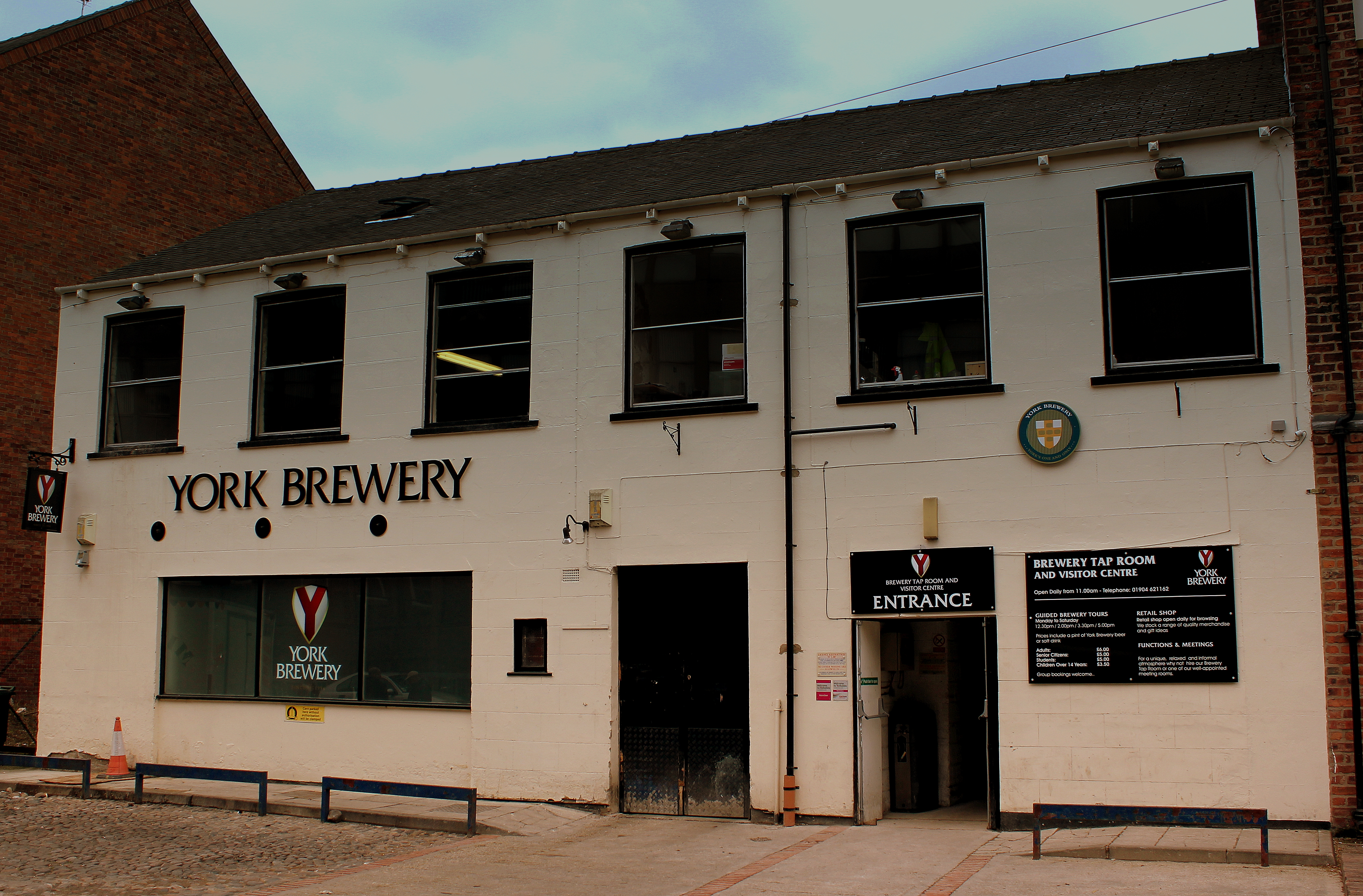
York Brewery, York

Operational Breweries in England
Brewery	County
12 Bar Brewing	Kent
1648 Brewing	East Sussex
3 Brewers	Hertfordshire
40 foot Brewery	London
4T's Brewery	Cheshire
8 Sail Brewery	Lincolnshire
Abbey Ales Brewery	Somerset
Abbey Ford Brewery	Surrey
Abbeydale Brewery	South Yorkshire
Acorn Brewery	South Yorkshire
Adnams Brewery	Suffolk
Aeronaut Brewery	London
Ales of Scilly	Cornwall
Alfred's Brewery	Hampshire
All Day Brewing Company	Norfolk
Allendale Brewery	Northumberland
Allgates Brewery	Lancashire
All Saints Brewery	Lincolnshire
Almasty Brewing Co	Tyne & Wear
Alphabet Brewing Company	Manchester
Amber Ales	Derbyshire
Ambridge Brewery	Worcestershire
Anarchy Brew Co	Northumberland
Andwells Brewery	Hampshire
Angel Ales	Worcestershire
Anspach & Hobday Brewery	London
Arbor Ales	Avon
Arkell's Brewery	Wiltshire
Arundel Brewery	West Sussex
Ascot Ales	Surrey
Ashover Brewery	Derbyshire
Ashley Down Brewery	Avon
Ashton Gate Brewery Co	Avon
Atlantic Brewery	Cornwall
Atom Beers	East Yorkshire
Atomic Brewery	Warwickshire
Austendyke Ales	Lincolnshire
Aylesbury Brewhouse	Buckinghamshire
Backyard Brewhouse (the)	West Midlands
Bad Seed Brewery	North Yorkshire
Ballards Brewery	West Sussex
Banks & Tayor Brewery	Bedfordshire
Bank Top Brewery	Lancashire
Banks's	West Midlands
Bare Arts Brewery	Lancashire
Barnet Brewery	London
Barngates Brewery	Cumbria
Barrow Green Brewery	Surrey
Barum Brewery	Devon
Batemans Brewery	Lincolnshire
Bath Ales	Avon & Somerset
Battledown Brewery	Gloucestershire
Battlefield Brewery	Shropshire
Beachy Head Brewery	East Sussex
Bear Claw Brewery	Northumberland
Beartown Brewery	Cheshire
Beavertown Brewery	London
Bedlam Brewery	West Sussex
Beer Brothers	Lancashire
Beerblefish Brewing Company	London
Beeston Brewery	Norfolk
Bell Street Brewery	Oxfordshire
Belleville Brewing	London
Belvoir Brewery	Leicestershire
Bespoke Brewery	Gloucestershire
Bewdley Brewery	Worcestershire
Bexley Brewery	Kent
Big Clock Brewery	Lancashire
Big Lamp Brewers	Tyne & Wear
Big Smoke Brew	London
Billericay Brewing	Essex
Binghams Brewery	Berkshire
Bingley Brewery	West Yorkshire
Bird's Brewery	Worcestershire
Bishop Nick	Essex
Bitter End (the)	Cumbria
Black Hill Brewery	Durham
Black Paw Brewery	Durham
Black Hole Brewery	Staffordshire
Black Sheep Brewery	North Yorkshire
Blackjack Brewery	Manchester
Blindmans Brewery	Somerset
Bloomsbury Brewery	London
Blue Anchor Brewery	Cornwall
Blue Bee Brewery	South Yorkshire
Blue Bell Brewery	Lincolnshire
Blue Monkey Brewery	Nottinghamshire
Blueball Brewery	Cheshire
Bluestone Brewery	Lancashire
Bollington Brewing	Cheshire
Bond Brews	Berkshire
Bootleg Brewing Co	Manchester
Bosco Brewing	Lancashire
Botley Brewery	Hampshire
Bournemouth Brewery	Dorset
Bowland Brewery	Lancashire
Bowman Ales	Hampshire
Box Steam Brewery	Wiltshire
Brakspear Brewery	Oxfordshire
Brampton Brewery	Derbyshire
Brancaster Brewery	Norfolk
Branscombe Vale Brewery	Devon
Brass Castle Brewery	North Yorkshire
Breakwater Brewery	Kent
Brentwood Brewing	Essex
Brew Buddies	Kent
Brew by Numbers	London
Brew Company	South Yorkshire
Brewhouse and Kitchen	Various
Brewsters Brewing Company	Lincolnshire
Brew York	North Yorkshire
Briarbank Brewing	Suffolk
Brick Brewery	London
Bridestones Brewing	West Yorkshire
Brighton Bier	East Sussex
Brightside Brewing Company	Manchester
Brightwater Brewery	Surrey
Brimstage Brewery	Merseyside
Bristol Beer Factory	Avon & Somerset
Brixton Brewery	London
Brockley Brewery	London
Brown Cow Brewery	North Yorkshire
Bude Brewery	Cornwall
Bullfinch Brewery	London
Buntingford Brewery	Hertfordshire
Burning Sky Brewery	East Sussex
Burton Bridge Brewery	Staffordshire
Butcombe Brewery	Avon & Somerset
Butts Brewery	Berkshire
Byatt's Brewery	West Midlands
By the Horns Brewing	London
Callowtop Bad Ram Brewery	Derbyshire
Calvors Brewery	Suffolk
Camden Town Brewery	London
Camerons Brewery	Durham
Cannon Royall Brewery	Worcestershire
Canopy Beer	London
Canterbury Ales (the)	Kent
Canterbury Brewers	Kent
Captain Cook Brewery	North Yorkshire
Castle Brewery	Cornwall
Castle Eden Brewery	County Durham
Castle Rock Brewery	Nottinghamshire
Cathedral Heights Brewery	Lincolnshire
Caveman Brewery	Kent
Caythorpe Brewery	Nottinghamshire
Cellar Head Brewing Co	Kent
Cerne Abbas	Dorset
Chalk Hill Brewery	Norfolk
Charles Wells	Bedfordshire
Charnwood Brewery	Leicestershire
Cheddar Ales	Somerset
Chiltern Brewery	Buckinghamshire
Chorlton Brewing	Manchester
Church End Brewery	Warwickshire
City of Cambridge Brewery	Cambridgeshire
Clarkshaws Brewery	London
Cliff Quay Brewery	Suffolk
Cloudwater Brew Co	Manchester
Clun Brewery	Shropshire
Coach House Brewing	Cheshire
Coastal Brewery	Cornwall
Cobra Beer	Staffordshire
Colchester Brewery	Essex
Compass Brewery	Oxfordshire
Concrete Cow Brewery	Buckinghamshire
Coniston Brewery	Cumbria
Consett Ale Works	Durham
Copper Dragon	North Yorkshire
Copper Kettle Craft Brewery	Northamptonshire
Cornish Crown Brewery	Cornwall
Corvedale Brewery	Shropshire
Cotleigh Brewery	Somerset
Cotswold Brewing Co.	Gloucestershire
Cotswold Lion	Gloucestershire
Cotswold Spring Brewing Co	Gloucestershire
Cottage Brewing	Somerset
Country Life Brewery	Devon
Crate Brewery	London
Creative Juices Brewing Company	Hertfordshire
Creaton Grange Ales	Northamptonshire
Cronx Brewery	London
Crooked Brook Beer Co	Sussex
Cross Bay Brewery	Lancashire
Crouch Vale Brewery	Essex
Cullercoats Brewery	Tyne & Wear
Cumbrian Legendary Ales	Cumbria
Curious Brewery	Kent
Daleside Brewery	North Yorkshire
Dancing Duck Brewery	Derbyshire
Dancing Man Brewery	Hampshire
Daniel Batham and Son	West Midlands
Daniel Thwaites Brewery	Lancashire
Dark Star Brewery	West Sussex
Dartmoor Brewery	Devon
Darwin Brewery	Tyne & Wear
Dawkins Ales	Somerset
Decent Brewery	Surrey
Derby Brewing Co	Derbyshire
Derventio Brewery	Derbyshire
Deva Craft Beer	Cheshire
Deya Brewing Company	Gloucestershire
Dickensian Brewery	Shropshire
Don Valley Brewery	Lincolnshire
Donnington Brewery	Gloucestershire
Dorking Brewery	Surrey
Dorset Brewing Company	Dorset
Dow Bridge Brewery	Leicestershire
Dove Street Brewery	Suffolk
Dow Bridge Brewery	Leicestershire
Downton Brewery	Wiltshire
Dragonfly Brewery	London
Driftwood Spars Brewery	Cornwall
Durham Brewery	Durham
Eagles Crag Brewery	West Yorkshire
Earl Soham Brewery	Suffolk
East London Brewing	London
Eight Arch Brewing	Dorset
Electric Bear Brewing	Avon
Elgood's Brewery	Cambridgeshire
Elland Brewery	West Yorkshire
Elliswood Brewery	Leicestershire
Emmanuales	South Yorkshire
Empire Brewing	West Yorkshire
Errant Brewery	Tyne & Wear
Essex Street Brewing	London
Everards Brewery	Leicestershire
Exe Valley Brewery	Devon
Exeter Brewery	Devon
Exmoor Brewery	Somerset
Fallen Acorn Brewing Co	Hampshire
Fat Cat Brewery (the)	Norfolk
Felstar Brewery	Essex
Fenland Brewery	Cambridgeshire
Fentimans	Northumberland
Firebrand Brewing	Cornwall
Firebrick Brewery	Tyne & Wear
First Chop Brewing Arm	Manchester
Five Points Brewing	London
Five Towns Brewery	West Yorkshire
Flack Manor Brewery	Hampshire
Flipside Brewery	Nottinghamshire
Florence Brewery	London
Flowerpots Brewery	Hampshire
Flying Monk Brewery	Wiltshire
Fonthill Brewing Co.	Kent
Force Brewery	Gloucestershire
Forge Brewery	Devon
Four Candles	Kent
Fourpure Brewing	London
Four Thieves	London
Franklins Brewery	East Sussex
Freedom Brewery	Staffordshire
Freeminer Brewery	Gloucestershire
Frensham Brewery	Surrey
Friday Beer Co (the)	Worcestershire
Friendship Adventure Brewery	London
Front Row Brewing	Cheshire
Fulstow Brewery	Lincolnshire
Full Circle Brew Co.	Tyne & Wear
Fuller's Brewery	London
Fuzzy Duck Brewery	Lancashire
G2 Brewing	Kent
Gadds' Ramsgate Brewery	Kent
Gaol Ales	Derbyshire
Gas Dog Brewery	Leicestershire
Geipel Brewery	Manchester
George Samuel Brewing	Durham
George's Brewery	Essex
George Wright Brewery	Merseyside
Ghost Brewing	West Yorkshire
Gipsy Hill Brewing	London
Glastonbury Ales	Somerset
Gloucester Brewery	Gloucestershire
Goachers Brewery	Kent
Goddards Brewery	Isle of Wight
Godstone Brewers (the)	Surrey
Goffs Brewery	Gloucestershire
Golden Duck Brewery	Leicestershire
Goody Ales	Kent
Goose Eye Brewery	Yorkshire
Grafters Brewery	Lincolnshire
Grafton Brewing	Nottinghamshire
Grain Brewery	Norfolk
Gravity Well Brewing Co	London
Great Central Brewery	Leicestershire
Great Gable Brewing Co Ltd	Cumbria
Great Heck Brewing	North Yorkshire
Great Newsome Brewery	East Yorkshire
Great Oakley Brewery	Northamptonshire
Great Western Brewing Company	Gloucestershire
Great Yorkshire Brewery	Yorkshire
Green Jack Brewery	Suffolk
Greene King Brewery	Suffolk
Greenfield Real Ale Brewery	Manchester
Gribble Inn and Brewery	West Sussex
Gun Dog Ales	Northants
H.B. Clark	West Yorkshire
Hackney Brewery	London
Hadrian Border Brewery	Tyne & Wear
Half Moon Brewery	North Yorkshire
Halfpenny Brewery	Gloucestershire
Hall & Woodhouse	Dorset
Hambleton Ales	North Yorkshire
Hammerpot Brewery	West Sussex
Hammerton Brewery	London
Hanlons Brewery	Devon
Happy Valley Brewery	Cheshire
Harbour Brewing	Cornwall
Hardknott Brewery	Cumbria
Harrogate Brewing Co	North Yorkshire
Hart of Stebbing Brewery	Essex
Harvey's Brewery	Sussex
Harwich Town Brewery	Essex
Hastings Beer Co	East Sussex
Hawkshead Brewery	Cumbria
Hege Row Brewing	West Yorkshire
Hedgedog Brewery	Surrey
Heist Brew Co.	Sheffield
Hepworth Brewery	West Sussex
Hereford Brewery	Herefordshire
Hereward Brewery	Cambridgeshire
Hesket Newmarket Brewery	Cumbria
Hexhamshire Brewery	Northumberland
High House Farm Brewery	Tyne & Wear
High Weald Brewery	West Sussex
Higsons Brewery	Liverpool
Hobsons Brewery	Shropshire
Hogs Back Brewery	Surrey
Holdens Brewery	West Midlands
Honest Brew	London
Hook Norton Brewery	Oxfordshire
Hop Art Craft Beer	Hampshire
Hop & Stagger Brewery	Shropshire
Hop Back Brewery	Wiltshire
Hop Kettle Brewery	Wiltshire
Hop Fuzz Brewery	Kent
Hop Studio (the)	North Yorkshire
Hop Stuff Brewery	London
Hop Yard Brewing Co	East Sussex
Hopdaemon Brewery Co	Kent
Hops & Glory	London
Hopshackle Brewery	Lincolnshire
Hopstar Brewery	Lancashire
Howard Town Brewery	Derbyshire
Howling Hops	London
Humpty Dumpty Brewery	Norfolk
Hunters Brewery	Devon
Hydes Brewery	Manchester
Idle Valley Brewery	Nottinghamshire
Ilkley Brewery	West Yorkshire
Irving Brewers	Hampshire
Isca Ales	Devon
Isla Vale Alesmiths	Kent
Island Brewery	Isle of Wight
Itchen Valley Brewery	Hampshire
J.W. Lees Brewery	Manchester
James Street Brewery	Avon
James & Kirkman	Yorkshire
Jennings Brewery	Cumbria
Jo C's Norfolk Ales	Norfolk
John Smith's Brewery	North Yorkshire
Jolly Sailor Brewery	East Yorkshire
Jones the Brewer	Herefordshire
Joseph Holt Brewery	Manchester
Joule's Brewery	Shropshire
Kelham Island Brewery	Yorkshire
Keltek Brewery	Cornwall
Kendricks Brewing	Warwickshire
Kennet & Avon Brewery	Wiltshire
Kent Brewery	Kent
Kernel Brewery (the)	London
Keswick Brewery	Cumbria
Kew Brewery	London
Keystone Brewery	Wiltshire
Kirkstall Brewery	West Yorkshire
Kissingate Brewery	West Sussex
Lacons Brewery	Norfolk
Lakedown Brewing Co.	East Sussex
Langham Brewery	West Sussex
Langton Brewery	Leicestershire
Larkins Brewery	Kent
Late Knights Brewery	London
Leamside Brewery	Durham
Ledbury Real Ales	Herefordshire
Leeds Brewery	West Yorkshire
Left Bank Brewery	London
Leighton Buzzard Brewing	Bedfordshire
Leviathan Brewing	West Midlands
Lincoln Green Brewing Co	Nottinghamshire
Little Beer Corporation (the)	Surrey
Little Brew	North Yorkshire
Little Critters Brewery	South Yorkshire
Liverpool Craft Beer	Liverpool
Lizard Ales	Cornwall
Loddon Brewery	Oxfordshire
London Beer Factory	London
London Brewing	London
Long Man Brewery	East Sussex
Longdog Brewery	Hampshire
Loose Cannon Brewery	Oxfordshire
Lovibonds Beer	Oxfordshire
Ludlow Brewing	Shropshire
Mad Cat Brewery	Kent
Magic Rock Brewing	West Yorkshire
Magpie Brewery	Nottinghamshire
Maidstone Brewing Company	Kent
Maldon Brewing	Essex
Malt the Brewery	Buckinghamshire
Malvern Hills Brewery	Worcestershire
Marble Brewery	Manchester
Maregade	London
Market Harborough Brewery	Leicestershire
Marston's	Staffordshire
Mauldons Brewery	Suffolk
Maxim Brewery	Tyne & Wear
Maypole Brewery	Nottinghamshire
McMullens Brewery	Hertfordshire
Meantime Brewing Co	London
Mersea Island Brewery	Essex
Mighty Oak Brewing Co	Essex
Milestone Brewery	Nottinghamshire
Milk Street Brewery	Somerset
Millis Brewing Company	Kent
Milton Brewery	Cambridgeshire
Mobberley FIne Ales	Cheshire
Moles Brewery	Wiltshire
Molson Coors Brewers	Staffordshire
Moncada Brewery	London
Mondo Brewing	London
Monkeychews Brewery	London
Moonshine Brewery	Cambridgeshire
Moor Beer Company	Somerset
Moorhouse's Brewery	Lancashire
Moorside Brewery	North Yorkshire
Mordue Brewery	Tyne & Wear
Mr Grundy's Brewery	Derbyshire
Mulberry Duck Brewing Company	Herefordshire
Munton's Brewery	Suffolk
Musket Brewery	Kent
Mysterious Brewing CompanyMysterious Brewing - About Us	Hampshire
Nailsworth Brewery	Gloucestershire
Naked Beer Co	West Sussex
Naylors Brewery	West Yorkshire
Neckstamper Brewing	London
Nelson Brewery	Kent
Nene Valley Brewery	Northamptonshire
Nethergate Brewery	Essex
New Lion Brewery	Devon
Newby Wyke Brewery	Lincolnshire
Nobby's Brewery	Northamptonshire
Nomadic Beers	West Yorkshire
Nook Brewhouse (the)	West Yorkshire
Nottingham Brewery	Nottinghamshire
Norfolk Brewhouse (the)	Norfolk
North Riding Brewery	North Yorkshire
North Yorkshire Brewery	North Yorkshire
Northern FC Brewery	Tyne & Wear
Northern Monk Brew Co	West Yorkshire
Noss Beer Works	Devon
Oakham Ales	Cambridgeshire
Oakleaf Brewery	Hampshire
Odyssey Brewery	Herefordshire
Old Cannon (the) Brewery	Suffolk
Old Dairy Brewery	Kent
Old Forge (the) Brewery	Kent
Old Mill Brewery	East Yorkshire
Old Pie Factory	Warwickshire
Oldershaw Brewery	Lincolnshire
One Mile End Brewery	London
Orbit Beers	London
Ossett Brewery	West Yorkshire
Otter Brewery	Devon
Oxted Brewery	Surrey
Palmers Brewery	Dorset
Panther Brewery	Norfolk
Paradigm Brewery	Hertfordshire
Park Brewery	London
Partizan Brewing	London
Peak Ales	Derbyshire
Peerless Brewing Company	Merseyside
Pennine Brewing	Yorkshire
Penpont Brewery	Cornwall
Pentrich Brewing	Derbyshire
Peoples Park Brewery	London
Perivale Brewery	London
Pheasantry Brewery	Nottinghamshire
Phipps NBC	Northamptonshire
Phoenix Brewery	Manchester
Pictish Brewery	Lancashire
Pied Bull	Cheshire
Pig & Porter	Kent
Pilgrim Brewery	Surrey
Pinnora Brewing	London
Plain Ales	Wiltshire
Poachers Brewery	Lincolnshire
Portobello Brewing Co	London
Potbelly Brewery	Northamptonshire
Potton Brewery	Bedfordshire
Powder Monkey Brewing Co.	Gosport
Prescott Ales	Gloucestershire
Pressure Drop Brewing	London
Prospect Brewery	Manchester
Purity Brewing Company	Warwickshire
Redchurch Brewery	Essex
Q Brewery	Leicestershire
Quantock Brewery	Somerset
Quartz Brewing	Staffordshire
Quirky Ales	Leeds
Radio City Beer Works	Essex
Rammy Craft Ales	Lancashire
Ramsbury Brewery	Wiltshire
Ramsgate Brewery	Kent
Rat Brewery	West Yorkshire
Raw Brewing Company (the)	Derbyshire
RCH Brewery	Somerset
Rebellion Beer Company	Buckinghamshire
Red Cat Brewery	Hampshire
Red Fox Brewery	Essex
Red Shoot Brewery	Hampshire
Red Squirrel Brewery	Hertfordshire
Red Willow Brewery	Cheshire
Redemption Brewing	London
Redwell Brewing	Norfolk
Revolutions Brewing	West Yorkshire
Richmond Brewing	Yorkshire
Ridgeside Brewery	West Yorkshire
Ringwood Brewery	Hampshire
Ripple Steam Brewery	Kent
Riverside	Lincolnshire
Robinsons Brewery	Greater Manchester
Rockin Robin Brewery	Kent
Rockingham Brewing Company	Northamptonshire
Romney Marsh Brewery	Kent
Roosters Brewery	North Yorkshire
Round Tower Brewery	Essex
Rowton Brewery	Shropshire
Rudgate Brewery	North Yorkshire
Sadler's Ales	West Midlands
Safron Brewery	Essex
St Austell Brewery	Cornwall
St George's Brewery	Worcestershire
St Ives Brewery	Cornwall
St Jude's Brewery	Suffolk
St. Peter's Brewery	Suffolk
Salamander Brewing Co	West Yorkshire
Salopian Brewery	Shropshire
Saltaire Brewery	West Yorkshire
Sambrook's Brewery	London
Samuel Smith Old Brewery	North Yorkshire
Sarah Hughes Brewery	West Midlands
Saxon City Ales	Herefordshire
Scarborough Brewery	North Yorkshire
Settle Brewery	North Yorkshire
Seven Bro7hers Brewery	Manchester
Severn Vale Brewing	Gloucestershire
Shalford Brewery	Essex
Sharp's Brewery	Cornwall
Sheffield Brewery	South Yorkshire
Shepherd Neame Brewery	Kent
Sherfield Village Brewery	Hampshire
Shiny Brewing Company	Derbyshire
Shoes Brewery	Herefordshire
Silhill Brewery	West Midlands
Silks Brewery	Essex
Simply Hops	Kent
Simpsons Fine Ales	Herefordshire
Siren Craft Brew	Berkshire
Skinner's Brewery	Cornwall
Slaters Ales	Staffordshire
Slaughterhouse Brewery	Warwickshire
Small World Beers	West Yorkshire
Solvay Society Brewery	London
Sonnet 43	Durham
South Hams Brewery	Devon
Southport Brewery	Merseyside
Southwark Brewery	London
Sperrin Brewery	Warwickshire
Spinning Dog Brewery	Hertfordshire
Spire Brewery	Derbyshire
Spitting Feathers Brewery	Cheshire
Springhead Fine Ales	Nottinghamshire
Stables Brewery	Durham
Stancill Brewery	South Yorkshire
Stanway Brewery	Gloucestershire
Star Brewing Company	Lincolnshire
Steam Machine Brewing Company	Durham
Steel City Brewing	South Yorkshire
Stonehenge Ales	Wiltshire
Stonehouse Brewery	Shropshire
Stringers Beer	Cumbria
Storm Brewing	Cheshire
Strawman Brewery	London
Stroud Brewery	Gloucestershire
Summerskills Brewery	Devon
Sunbeam Ales	West Yorkshire
Sunny Republic	Dorset
Surrey Hills Brewery	Surrey
Swan on the Green (The) Microbrewery	Kent
Talking Tides	Redcar
Tamworth Brewing Company	Staffordshire
Tap East Brewery	London
Tatton Brewery	Cheshire
Tavy Ales	Devon
Teme Valley Brewery	Worcestershire
Temperance Street Brewery	Manchester
Tetley's Brewery	West Yorkshire
Thames Side Brewery	Surrey
Theakstons	North Yorkshire
Thirst Class Ale	Greater Manchester
Thornbridge Brewery	Derbyshire
Three B's	Lancashire
Three Castles Brewery	Wiltshire
Three Daggers Brewery	Wiltshire
Three Fiends Brewhouse	West Yorkshire
Three Kings Brewery	Tyne & Wear
Three Sods Brewery	London
Three Tuns Brewery	Shropshire
Thurstons Horsell Brewing Company	Surrey
Thwaites Brewery	Lancashire
Tigertops Brewery	West Yorkshire
Tillingbourne Brewery	Surrey
Time & Tide	Kent
Timothy Taylor's	West Yorkshire
Tintagel Brewery	Cornwall
Tír Dhá Ghlas Brewery	Kent
Titanic Brewery	Staffordshire
Tollgate Brewery	Derbyshire
Tombstone Brewery	Norfolk
Tonbridge Brewery	Kent
Toolmakers Brewery	South Yorkshire
Torrside Brewing	Derbyshire
Track Brewing	Manchester
Très Bien Brewery	Leicestershire
Tring Brewery	Hertfordshire
Triple fff Brewery	Hampshire
True North Brew Co	South Yorkshire
Truman's Brewery	London
Tunnel Brewery	Warwickshire
Turning Point Brew Co	North Yorkshire
Twickenham Brewery	Middlesex
Twisted Brewing Co	Wiltshire
Two Cocks Brewery	Berkshire
Two Fingers Brewing Co.	London
Two Towers Brewery	West Midlands
Tyne Bank Brewery	Tyne & Wear
Uffa Brewery	Suffolk
Uley Brewery	Gloucestershire
Ulverston Brewing Company	Cumbria
Upham Brewery	Hampshire
Vale Brewery	Buckinghamshire
Verulam Brewery	Hertfordshire
VIP Brewery	Northumberland
Vocation Brewery	West Yorkshire
Wadworth Brewery	Wiltshire
Wantsum Brewery	Kent
Warwickshire Beer Company	Warwickshire
Watermill Inn & Brewing Co (the)	Cumbria
Weal Ales Brewery	Staffordshire
Weard'Ale Brewery	Durham
Weatheroak Brewery	West Midlands
Weetwood Brewery	Cheshire
Weird Beard Brew	London
Welbeck Abbey Brewery	Nottinghamshire
Weltons Brewery	Surrey
Wem Brewing Company	Shropshire
Wensleydale Brewery	North Yorkshire
West Berkshire Brewery	Berkshire
West End Brewery	Leicestershire
Westerham Brewery Company	Kent
Wetherby Brew Co	West Yorkshire
Whippet Brewing	West Yorkshire
White Horse Brewery	Oxfordshire
Whitstable Brewery	Kent
Wibblers Brewery	Essex
Wickwar Brewing Company	Gloucestershire
Wild Beer Co (the)	Somerset
Wild Card Brewery	London
Wild Weather Ales	Hampshire
Willy Good Ale	Wiltshire
Wimbledon Brewery	London
Wincle Beer	Cheshire
Windsor & Eton Brewery	Berkshire
Wobbly Brewing Company	Herefordshire
Wold Top Brewery	East Yorkshire
Wolf Brewery	Norfolk
Wood Brewery	Shropshire
Wood Farm Brewery	Warwickshire
Wooden Hand Brewery	Cornwall
Woodforde's Brewery	Norfolk
Woodlands Brewing Co	Cheshire
Wrekin Brewing Co	Shropshire
Wychwood Brewery	Oxfordshire
Wye Valley Brewery	Herefordshire
Wylam Brewery	Northumberland
Xtreme Ales	Cambridgeshire
Yard of Ale Brewing	Durham
Yeovil Ales	Somerset
York Brewery	North Yorkshire
Yorkshire Dales Brewery	North Yorkshire
Yorkshire Heart	North Yorkshire
Zero Degrees	London

=== Gallery ===
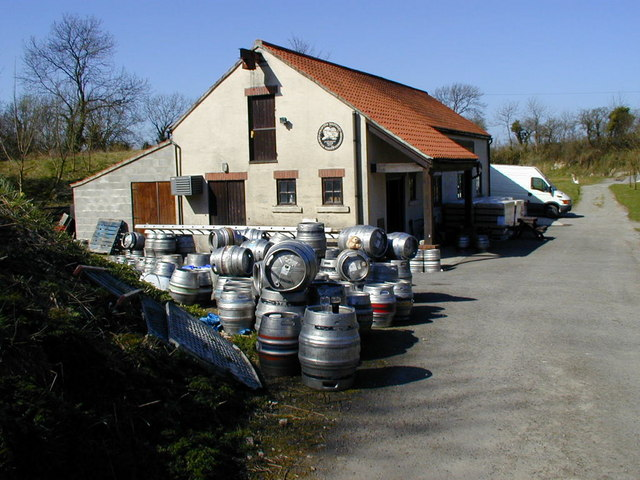
Cropton Brewery is located in Cropton, a village and civil parish in North Yorkshire

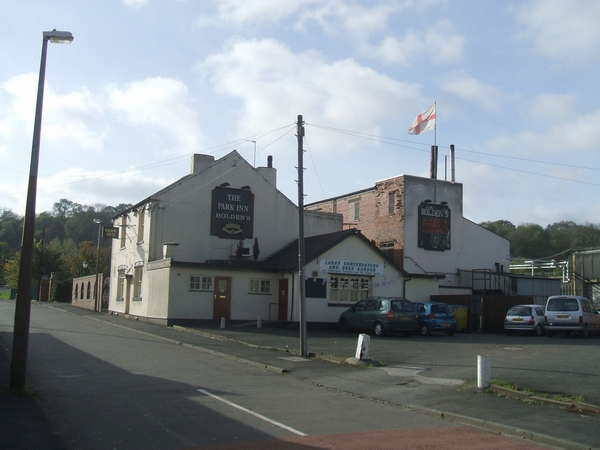
Holdens Brewery, Woodsetton, Dudley, West Midlands

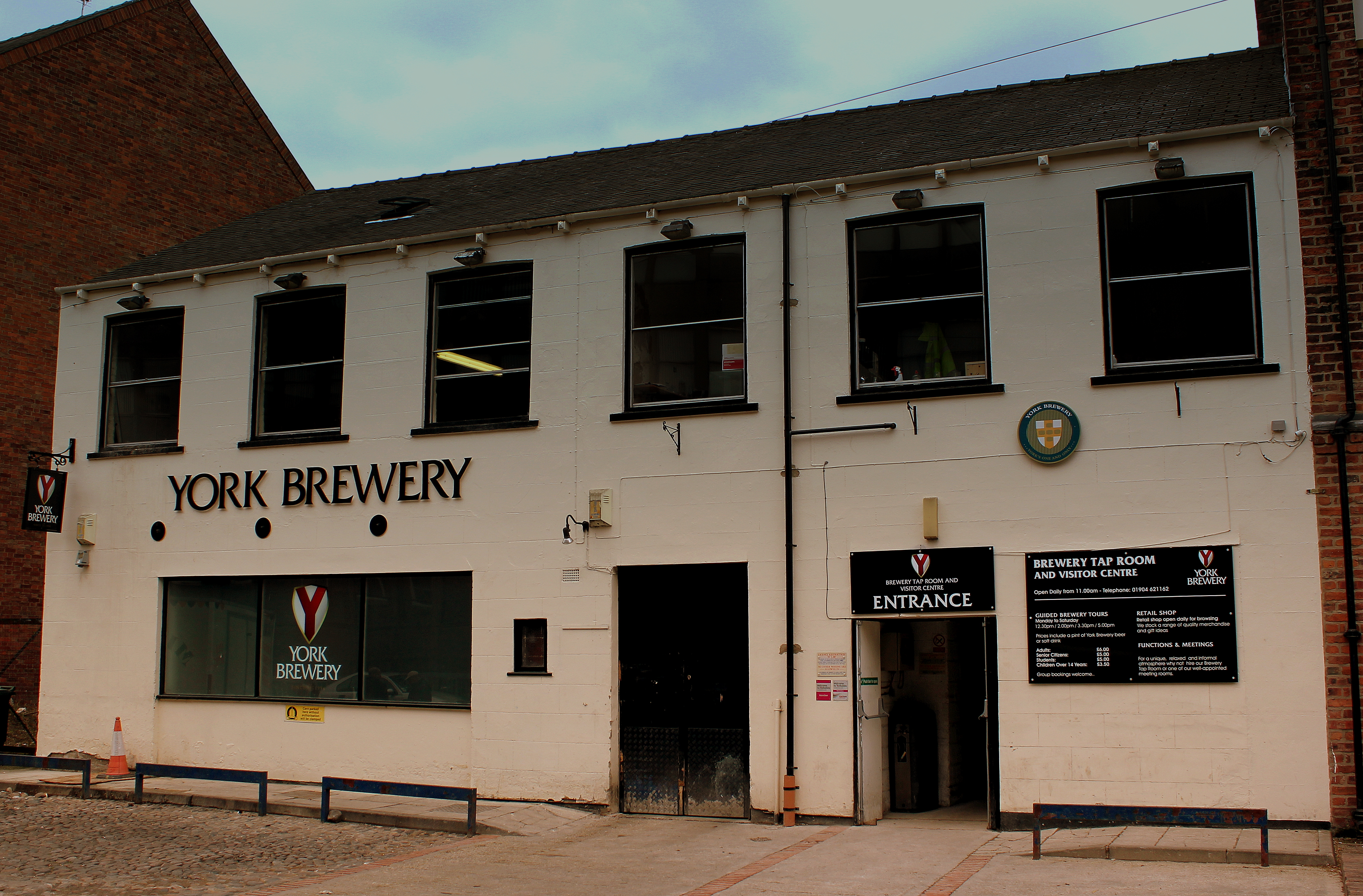
York Brewery, York

== See also ==
- Ale conner
- Beer and breweries by region
- Beer in England
- Beer in Wales
- Brewers of Burton
- List of breweries in Berkshire
- List of breweries in Birmingham
- List of breweries in the Black Country
- List of breweries in Scotland
- List of microbreweries
