= Peerless =

Peerless may refer to:

== Companies and organizations ==
- Peerless Motor Company, an American automobile manufacturer.
- Peerless Brewing Company, in Birkenhead, UK
- Peerless Group, an insurance and financial services company in India
- Peerless Records, a record company
- Peerless SC, professional football club based in Kolkata, India
- Peerless Volleyball Club, Lima, Peru
- Peerless Faucet, a brand of the Delta Faucet Company
- Agricultural equipment manufactured by Geiser Manufacturing

== Places ==
- Peerless, Indiana, a town in the United States
- Peerless, Utah, a ghost town
- Peerless, Saskatchewan, Canada
- Peerless Building, Fresno

== Other ==
- Peerless Price, American football wide receiver
- Peerless Quartet, an American vocal group
- Peerless (UK car), a UK automobile
- Peerless armoured car, developed in 1919
- Iomega Peerless , a removable hard disk of Iomega brand
- "The Good Ships Peerless", case of mutual mistake in the English law of contract, more formally known as Raffles v Wichelhaus
