= Beavertown Brewery =

Brewery based in Tottenham, London

Coordinates: 51.645°N 0.030°W

Beavertown Brewery logo

Beavertown Brewery is a British brewery based in Tottenham, north London, England. It was acquired by the Dutch company Heineken in 2022.

Beavertown was founded in 2011 by Logan Plant, the son of Robert Plant, former lead singer of the English rock band Led Zeppelin. The brewery's name came from the nickname for De Beauvoir Town, the area of London where its first beer was brewed. Duke's Brew & Que on Downham Road, London N1, was unexpectedly closed in 2017.

In June 2018, it was announced that Heineken would be buying a minority stake, so that Beavertown could spend £40 million on a new brewery and visitor site. The new brewery was launched in 2020, with a capacity of 500,000 hectolitres, a ten-fold increase in their previous capacity.

Beavertown produces mostly India pale ales (IPAs), with seasonal beers on rotation.

== Ownership ==
As of June 2019, Heineken UK own 11,196 (49.5%) of the 'A' shares of TP & Munch Ltd, which owns 100% of both Beavertown Brewery Ltd and the dormant Lost Star Ltd. Logan Plant owns 5,833 'A' shares (25.8%) and his wife Bridget owns 5,605 'A' shares (24.8%). Creative Director Nick Dwyer has 105 'B' shares; operations director Nikola Marjanovic Heineken have also made a loan via TP & Munch that is secured on the brewery's assets and trademarks.

In August 2022, Bridget and Logan Plant resigned their directorships of TP & Munch Ltd, leaving Heineken UK Limited with full control of the company.

== Locations ==
Beavertown operates two brewery locations in Tottenham Hale (opened in 2014) and Enfield (opened 2020). Beavertown has a close relationship with the English Premier League club Tottenham Hotspur, operating a microbrewery at the Tottenham Hotspur Stadium, along with reopening the Corner Pin pub opposite the stadium in 2021. Beavertown serves the exclusive One Of Our Own IPA at the latter two locations since 2020.

== Range ==
- Neck Oil (4.3% ABV) – Session IPA
- Gamma Ray (5.4% ABV) – American Pale Ale
- Lupuloid (6.7% ABV) – IPA
- Lazer Crush (0.3% ABV) – Alcohol Free Beer IPA
- Bones (4.4% ABV) – Lager
- Satellite (2.8% ABV) – Super Session IPA
- Lunar Haze (4.5% ABV) – Hazy IPA
- One of Our Own (4.9% ABV) - Session IPA (Note: Exclusively served at the Corner Pin pub and the Tottenham Hotspur Stadium)
- Heavy Gravity (6.5% ABV) – Hazy IPA
- Cosmic Drop (4.0% ABV) – Lager with Fruit Punch
- Cosmic Drop (4.0% ABV) – Lager with Tropical Fruit
- Cosmic Drop (4.0% ABV) – Lager with Berry
- Cosmic Drop (4.0% ABV) – Watermelon Punch Beer

== See also ==
- List of breweries in England
