= List of breweries in the Black Country =

This is a list of breweries in the Black Country. The Black Country is a region in the Midlands of England. Although its boundaries are not precisely defined, for the purposes of this list, the Black Country will be defined as the extending over the 4 Local authority areas of Wolverhampton, Dudley, Sandwell and Walsall.

== List of breweries ==
- 458 Brewery. Brewery at Wollaston.
- AJ's Ales. Brewery sited in Walsall.
- Angel Ales. Brewery sited at Cradley.
- Backyard. Brewery sited at Walsall.
- Banks's. Brewery sited in Wolverhampton.
- Bathams. Brewery sited at Brierley Hill.
- Beat Brewery. Brewery sited in Lye, Stourbridge.
- Beowulf. Brewery sited at Brownhills (north of Walsall).
- Black Country Ales. Brewery sited at Lower Gornal
- Blue Bear. Brewery at Smethwick.
- Broughs.Brewery at Wolverhampton.
- Craddock's. Brewery sited at Stourbridge.
- Fixed Wheel. Brewery sited in Blackheath.
- Fownes. Brewery sited in Upper Gornal.
- Green Duck. Brewery sited at Stourbridge.
- Holdens. Brewery sited at Woodsetton.
- Newbridge. Brewery sited at Bilston.
- Olde Swan (Ma Pardoes). Brewery in Netherton.
- Pig Iron. Brewery sited at Blackheath.
- Punchline. Brewery at Wolverhampton.
- Sarah Hughes. Brewery sited at Sedgley.
- Toll End. Brewery sited in Tipton.
