= Phipps NBC =

English brewery

Phipps Northampton Brewery Company Ltd has a long and varied history of brewing real ale and stout. It is based in Northampton, England.

== Early brewing history ==
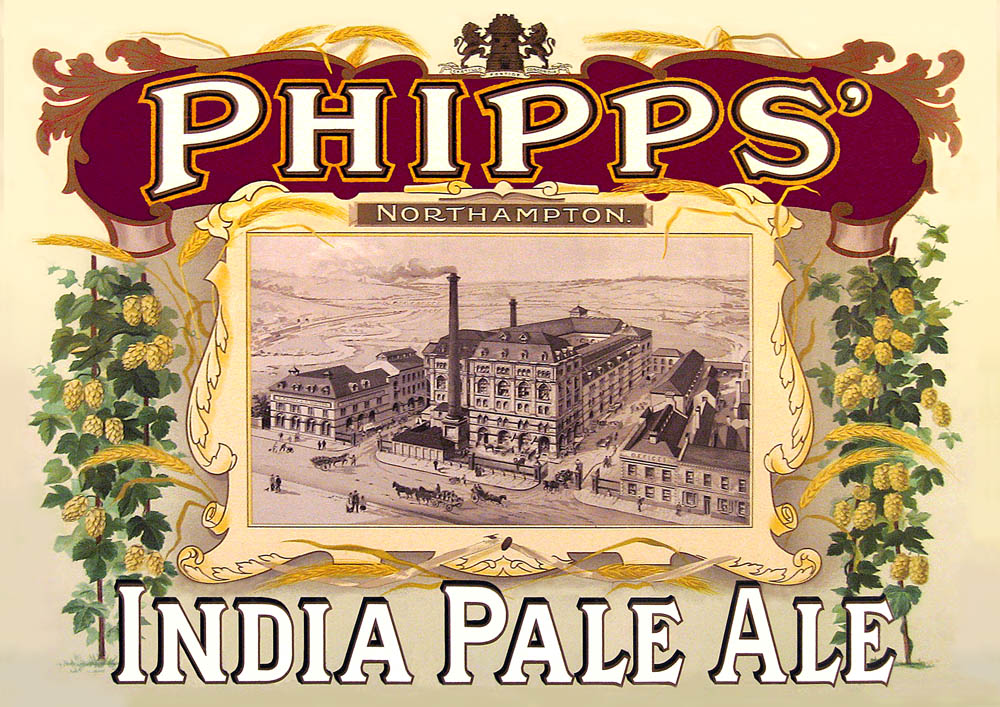
A 19th-century poster for Phipps India Pale Ale showing the Northampton Brewery on Bridge Street, now the site of Carlsberg UK

The company began in the South Northamptonshire town of Towcester where founder Pickering Phipps started brewing in 1801. A second brewery was opened on Bridge Street, Northampton in 1817. All production was moved to Northampton in 1901 following a fire which destroyed the original brewery.

Trading as P. Phipps & Co. under the chairmanship of Pickering Phipps II (1836–1890), the company grew to become the largest brewer in the Midlands by the end of the 19th century. The Phipps family was prominent in Northampton in the 19th and early 20th century; both Pickering I and II were mayors and the latter an MP. An area of the town to the east of the racecourse was developed by the family and is known as Phippsville.

Other regional brewers absorbed by Phipps included, Ratliffe and Jeffery of Northampton in 1899, Hipwell and Co. of Olney in 1920, T. Mannings of Northampton in 1933 and Campbell Praed of Wellingborough in 1954. In 1957, P. Phipps merged with neighbours, Northampton Brewery Co. Ltd. At this point, the company had 1131 tied houses (pubs), 711 from Phipps and 420 from NBC.

In 1960, London-based brewer Watney Mann launched a successful bid for the company. The new owner's keg bitter, Red Barrel, was developed by being brewed in Northampton alongside the local beers. However, to ensure a consistent product, Watneys shipped up tanker loads of water from the Mortlake Brewery in London where the eventual mass production occurred, By 1968, all traditional draught bitters were axed and the company renamed Watney Mann (Midland) Ltd. The general spread of keg bitter in the late 1960s, and in particular Watney's treatment of Northamptonshire drinkers, were key spurs to the formation of the Campaign for Real Ale in 1971. Since Phipps NBC had dominated its trading area, Watney's removal of all traditional hand pumps from its Midland pub estate led to CAMRA describing Northamptonshire as a real ale desert.

At the beginning of the 1970s, a partnership was formed between Watney Mann and Danish brewer Carlsberg Group with the aim of rebuilding the Phipps Bridge Street Brewery site into a modern lager plant. Watney Mann ale and stout brewing ended on 26 May 1974, and most of the original brewery was demolished. Above ground the relatively modern office block was retained as part of Carlsberg's brewery, renamed Jacobsen House albeit they said retention was to be short term. To accommodate the new brewery, a number of the branches of the fragmented River Nene were rerouted thus ending the pattern of waterways which had existed on maps since at least 1610. Below ground the giant Foundry Street well under the old Albion Brewery stables (which Phipps had enlarged to form the principal water source for the site) was incorporated into the new lager brewery. There is also a nondescript green shed in the old stonewall along nearby Victoria Promenade which houses a pump from another well. The Watney regional office relocated to a purpose-built office and distribution centre across town in New Duston.

== Pub chain history ==
Following the closure of the Phipps Bridge Street brewery, head brewer Noel "Dusty" Miller initially transferred to Carlsberg as deputy head brewer along with many brewery workers and office staff. After just two years, he left to take up the Production Director's post at Ruddles Brewery near Oakham. His deputy and final head brewer, Bill Urquhart, founded the country's first microbrewery in 1974, Litchborough, based in the Northamptonshire village of the same name. Other former Bridge Street brewers rose to prominence in the industry in the following decades; Pat Heron became head brewer at Hall and Woodhouse, Bob Hipwell and Peter Mauldon remained in the Grand Met empire, although the latter eventually returned to Suffolk to revive his family brewery, Mauldons. Phipps's chief chemist, Mike Henson, became Carlsberg UK's first chief chemist.

The company continued trading as a Northampton-based pub chain, using the title "Mann's Northampton Brewery Co." after 1977. This became "Manns and Norwich Breweries" after 1987 following the incorporation of another of Grand Met's pub chains into the business. Ownership passed from Grand Metropolitan, who had taken over Watney Mann in 1971, through the Courage division of Foster's Group from 1992 to '95 when Scottish and Newcastle (S&N) purchased Courage. From this point some of the group's pubs traded under the Chef & Brewer brand. In November 2003, S&N began selling off its British pub estates and many former Phipps properties were bought by the Spirit Group, later Punch Taverns.

== Return to brewing ==
The pub chain's Northampton managers had been preparing to re-introduce a Phipps draught bitter at the time of the S&N sale and took the opportunity to take over the dormant company name and trademark. Draught Phipps IPA was re-launched in December 2008. This was followed by NBC's Red Star, Ratliffe's Celebrated Stout in 2009 and Phipps Diamond Ale in 2012. The beers were brewed from original recipes at Grainstore brewery in Oakham under the supervision of a number of old Phipps brewers. The key figure amongst these was Pat Heron, an NBC and Phipps NBC brewer from 1954 to 1966 before becoming head brewer at Hall and Woodhouse.

In early 2014 the company returned production to Northampton by restoring and back converting the Albion Brewery on Kingswells Street. It was built in 1884 by Ratliffe and Jeffery and was part of the Phipps's empire from 1899 to 1919. Following removal of the original brewery plant, the building produced lemonade and then from 1954 to 2011 housed a tannery. Brewing started again in March 2014, just under 40 years since the closure of Phipps's original brewery in the town.

In August 2015, the Albion Bar opened its doors every day in the brewery.

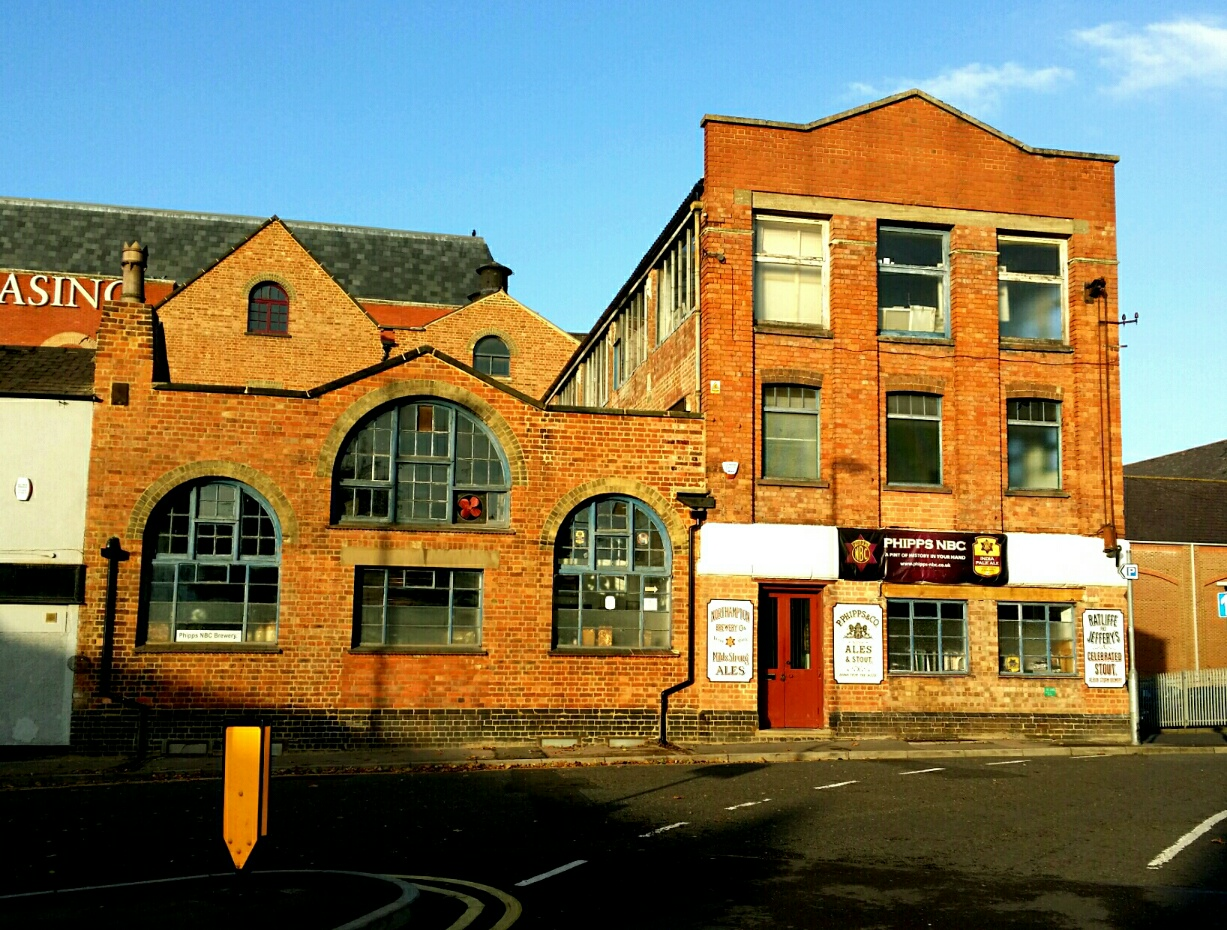
The former Ratliffe & Jeffery then P. Phipps & Co Albion Brewery, Kingswell Street, Northampton

== Other names ==
- Mann's Northampton Brewery Co from 1977
- Mann's & Norwich Breweries from 1987

== Constituent businesses ==
Before purchase by Watney Mann in 1960:

- Pickering Phipps founded 1801
- Ratliffe & Jeffery absorbed 1899
- Hipwell & Co 1920
- T Manning 1933
- Campbell Praed 1954
- Northampton Brewery Co 1957

== See also ==
- List of breweries in England
