= Cloudwater Brew Co =

Craft brewery based in Manchester

- Industry: Brewing
- Founded: 13 January 2014
- Founders: Paul Jones and James Campbell
- Headquarters: Manchester, England
- Products: Craft beer Non-alcoholic beverages
- Website: cloudwaterbrew.co

Cloudwater Brew Co is an independent craft brewery based in Manchester, England. Established in 2014, the brewery began making beer the following year and quickly gained a reputation for the quality of its products. In 2017 and 2018, Cloudwater was ranked among the ten best breweries in the world by beer scoring website RateBeer, becoming the only UK brewery ever to be featured. Several Cloudwater beers have also received accolades at the same awards.

Besides beer, the brewery also produces its own range of non-alcoholic sodas, as well as operating brewery tap rooms in Manchester and London and organising an annual beer festival, Friends & Family & Beer. Cloudwater Brew Co is a member of the Society of Independent Brewers.

== History ==
Cloudwater Brew Co was founded in 2014 by Paul Jones, who had no prior experience in the brewing industry, and James Campbell, formerly the head brewer at fellow Manchester brewery Marble. The pair secured premises in the Piccadilly Trading Estate, which they furnished with a 20 US barrel (roughly 14.3 UK barrels) brewing kit imported from the United States. The size of the operation, relatively large for a new UK brewery, attracted considerable anticipation in the British beer press and on social media. The name "Cloudwater" was chosen as it combined two simple English words in a novel way. It is also a translation of the Zen Buddhist term unsui ("cloud, water"), taken from a Chinese poem about the philosophy of wandering Buddhist monks. The brewery's minimalist logo was inspired by the branding used by wine producers; Jones specifically wanted to avoid the "macho" imagery used by other breweries at the time. The colours used in the logo change seasonally along with the brewery's beer ranges.

Brewing commenced on 14 February 2015 and Cloudwater hosted a launch event the following month at the Port Street Beer House in Manchester, a well-known local craft beer venue. The brewery soon gained recognition for the quality of its beers and within two years of opening was named the fifth best brewery in the world by beer scoring website RateBeer, becoming the first and (as of 2020) only UK brewery ever to make the top 10. At the 2017 awards (held in 2018), Cloudwater climbed to second place, with only Hill Farmstead Brewery of Greensboro, Vermont ranking higher.

Cloudwater received national newspaper coverage in 2017 after it was reported that one of its beers, NW DIPA, was on sale for £13.40 per pint at The Rake pub in Borough Market, London. At the time, the average cost of a pint of beer in London was £4.20 according to The Good Pub Guide. Jones defended the higher price, explaining that the quantity and freshness of hops used to brew the beer made it expensive to produce. He also stated that at 9% alcohol by volume the beer was not intended to be served by the pint, and that due to its strength the number of units of alcohol by price was equivalent to weaker, cheaper beers.

Head brewer and co-founder James Campbell parted ways with Cloudwater in September 2018 in order to work as a brewing consultant and raise funds to create his own brewery. He later went on to launch nanobrewery Cervezas de Autor. Since Campbell's departure, Cloudwater have continued without a head brewer, which is unusual for a British brewery.

In 2019, the brewery organised a not-for-profit festival, Friends & Family & Beer, featuring 59 breweries from around the world. The event was well-attended, attracting more than 1,500 visitors. However, it was closed down by police on the first evening after it transpired that the venue, Upper Campfield Market, did not have a licence permitting the sale of alcohol. Following interventions from the mayor of Manchester, Andy Burnham, and the city's "night-time tsar", Sacha Lord, the festival was allowed to continue for the rest of the weekend. Friends & Family & Beer returned for its second incarnation in 2020, in a new venue at Manchester Central.

It was announced in 2021 that Cloudwater was to begin selling its beers through major UK supermarket chain Tesco. The launch included a four-pack of beers brewed in collaboration with breweries run by people from groups under-represented within the craft beer world: Eko Brewing and Rock Leopard, two of the UK's only Black-owned breweries; Good Karma, specialising in vegan, alcohol-free beers; and Queer Brewing, a brewery established to represent those from the LGBTQ+ community. A second range of beers solely using the Cloudwater name was also introduced. These were to be brewed under contract by Scottish brewery BrewDog using Cloudwater's recipes and yeast. In early 2022, the brewery announced it was ending its agreement with BrewDog prematurely and would eventually stop selling beer through Tesco.

== Products ==
=== Beers ===
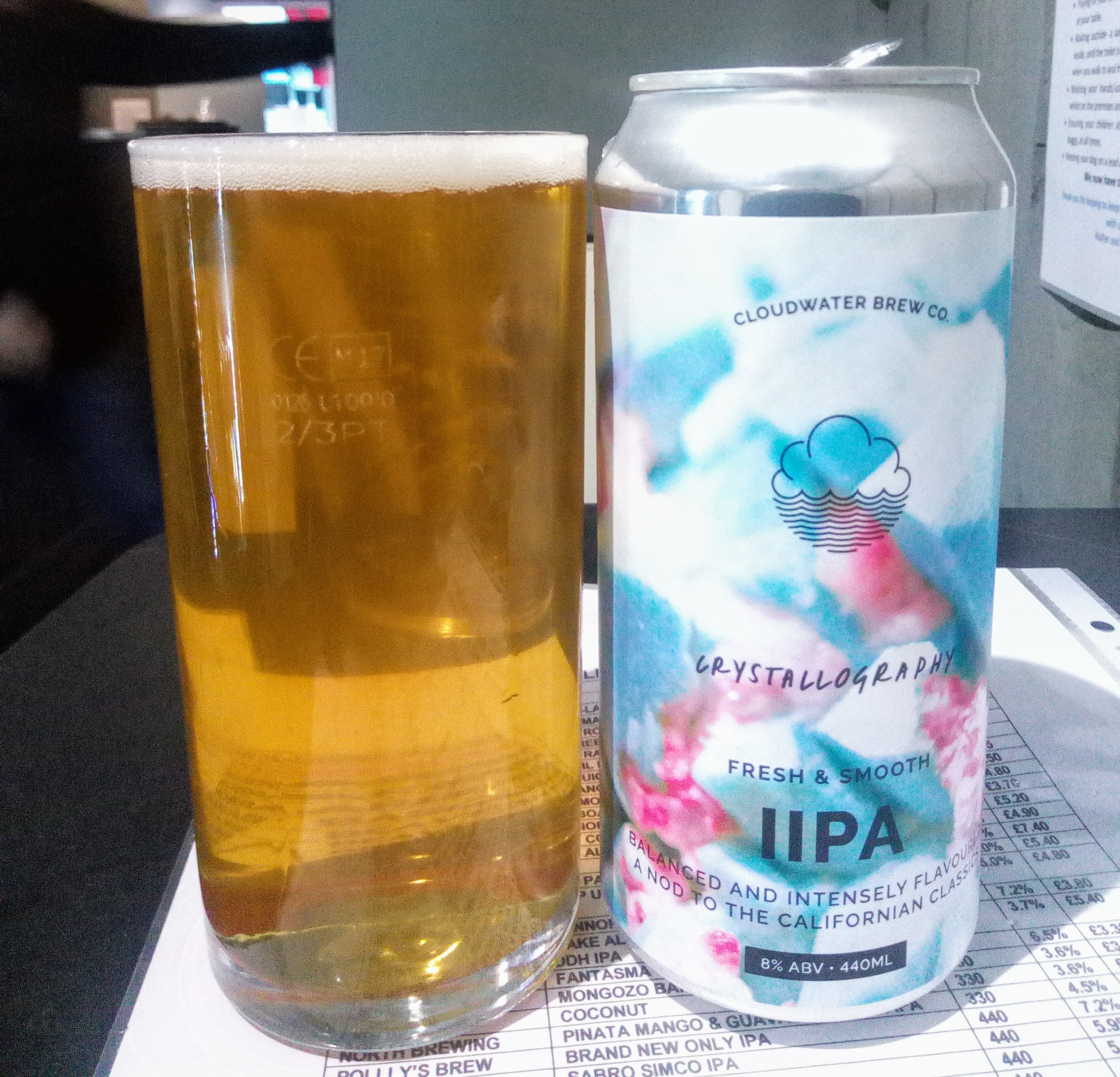
Cloudwater was one of the first UK craft breweries to sell its beers in 440 ml cans.

From its inception the brewery has produced a wide range of beers, from traditional English styles such as mild, stout and India pale ale (IPA), to international varieties such as Helles, grisette and cream ale. Unlike most British breweries, Cloudwater opted not to brew a core range of beers, instead creating a seasonally changing selection using hops and malts available at different times of year. The brewery's range of Double IPAs, a heavily hopped and stronger version of the traditional IPA, have received particular acclaim; four beers from the range were named among the Best New Beers of 2017 at the RateBeer awards in Santa Rosa, California.

In January 2017, the brewery announced that it was to cease production of cask-conditioned ale. Co-founder Paul Jones cited inadequate profit margins and unacceptable levels of variation in the final product due to differing cellarmanship standards among the reasons for the decision. After an 18-month hiatus, Cloudwater returned to cask brewing in October 2018 with the stipulation that it would only be sold at a small number of venues approved by the brewery. The move was welcomed by the likes of the Campaign for Real Ale and beer writer Roger Protz.

Cloudwater was one of the first British craft breweries to market its beers in 440 ml cans, having previously predominantly used 330 ml glass bottles. This decision led numerous other UK microbreweries to follow suit, and by October 2018 the larger cans accounted for 40% of all packaged craft beer sold nationwide. The designs featured on Cloudwater's cans have also received recognition; in 2019 the brewery was featured in the BEER+ART event at the Tate Modern in London.

As of April 2022, Cloudwater Brew Co has released more than one thousand different beers, including collaborations with national and international breweries such as BrewDog, Magic Rock, Lervig, Jester King and To Øl. On the popular beer scoring app Untappd, the brewery's beers have an average rating of 3.96 out of 5, making Cloudwater the 17th-highest rated English brewery.

=== Cloudwater Soda ===
In addition to beer, the brewery also produces a range of non-alcoholic beverages. Originally marketed as "Good Call Soda", the brand was debuted in 2019 at the Mindful Drinking festival in London. The name was deliberately chosen to distinguish the drinks from Cloudwater's usual offerings, but also to clarify that the product was not alcohol-free beer, despite incorporating ingredients often found in beer such as hops and fruit. However, the company was accused of copyright infringement by Heineken, who claimed the name was too similar to the "Good Call" slogan associated with its Foster's Lager brand. The range was subsequently rebranded as simply "Cloudwater Soda".

== Locations ==
Cloudwater's London taproom on Enid Street

Initially, Cloudwater operated two brewery taps: one at the brewery itself on the Piccadilly Trading Estate, and another nearby in a railway arch beneath Manchester Piccadilly station. The latter was known as the Barrel Store and focused on the brewery's more experimental offerings such as barrel-aged beers and sours. The on-site brewery bar closed in early 2017 to allow for extra production due to increased demand. In July 2018, Cloudwater also closed the Barrel Store and opened Unit 9, a dedicated tap room adjacent to the brewery with 20 draught beer lines.

In 2018, Cloudwater announced plans to launch an additional tap room on Enid Street in London. The venue is located on the so-called Bermondsey Beer Mile, a collection of around 15 breweries and bars dedicated to craft beer. Jones cited the Bermondsey scene as one of his inspirations when originally establishing the brewery and explained that his desire to be able to sell the freshest possible beer to drinkers there was a key factor in opening the bar.

In July 2021, Cloudwater opened a pub called Sadler's Cat at the site of the former Pilcrow Pub in NOMA near Manchester Victoria station. The pub is named after pioneering balloonist James Sadler and the cat that travelled with him on his flight from Manchester to Radcliffe in 1785.

In January 2022, it was reported that Cloudwater would be opening a beer hall at Kampus, a new neighbourhood bordering Manchester's gay village. It was to take up the ground floor of the former Victorian shipping warehouse Minshull House and feature a kitchen as well as event spaces. However, this never materialised.
