= Bath Beer Festival =

Bath Beer Festival is an annual beer festival held in the city of Bath, England.

The festival offers opportunities to taste over 85 real ales, along with a range of traditional cider and Belgian beers.

The 30th CAMRA festival was held on two nights beginning 19 October 2007 at The Pavilion. 10,000 pints were served at the event. Local brewery Abbey Ales used the event to launch a new beer, Bellringer Maximus.

The CAMRA Beer Festival, held for 33 years in Oct in the Pavilion has moved venue and season. In 2011 the local CAMRA branch found that the hiring conditions imposed by the venue were unacceptable. Since 2011 some festivals have been held in the traditional venue and calendar slot but these have been commercial ventures not connected with CAMRA in any way.

Since 2013 the CAMRA festival has been held in the Premier Suite of Bath Rugby and preparations are well advanced for the 37th CAMRA Bath Beer Festival to be held 10–11 April 2015, once again in The Premier Suite, Bath Rugby.
