= Abbey Ales Brewery =

Brewery in Bath, England

Abbey Ales
- Industry: Alcoholic beverage
- Founded: 1997
- Headquarters: Bath, Somerset
- Products: Beer
- Owner: Alan Morgan

Abbey Ales is an English brewery located in city of Bath, England. It was founded in 1997 by Alan Morgan.

== Beers ==
Bellringer is a cask beer with an alcohol by volume of 4.2%, launched at the Bath Beer Festival in 1997. It was awarded 'Beer of the Festival' at the Cotswolds CAMRA Festival in July 1998, the Devizes CAMRA Festival in May 1999, the Bath Beer Festival in October 2000, and was a finalist in the Champion Beer of Britain competition in 2001.

Other beers which are brewed on a seasonal basis, or for special occasions, include:

- Mild 4.0% abv
- Chorister 4.5% abv
- Bath Star 4.6% abv
- Resurrection 4.6% abv
- Steeple Jack 4.7% abv
- Salvation 4.8% abv
- Twelfth Night 5.0% abv, a dark bitter produced at Christmas.
- White Friar 5.0% abv
- Black Friar 5.3% abv
- Bellringer Maximus 5.0% abv, a new version of the Bellringer bitter, launched at the Bath Beer Festival in October 2007, to celebrate the brewery's 10th anniversary.

The brewery also owns the Star Inn, Coeur de Lion, The Assembly Inn, and the Hop Pole pubs in Bath, and The Bell At Standerwick, near Frome.
