= HonestBrew =

Online craft beer retailer

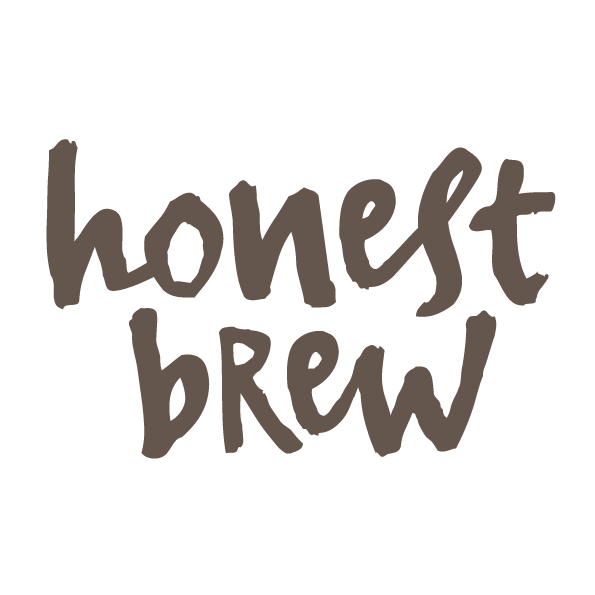
- Industry: Food distribution
- Founded: 2014; 12 years ago
- Defunct: 17 June 2022; 3 years ago
- Headquarters: London, United Kingdom
- Key people: Michael Alcock (CEO); Craig Willmott (Co-Founder)
- Products: Craft Beer, Beer
- Number of employees: 15
- Website: honestbrew.co.uk

HonestBrew was a United Kingdom-based online craft beer retailer. The company delivered beers direct to customers across the U.K. and Europe, as well as supplying offices. They organised their own events, took part in industry-wide festivals and actively launched and promoted new breweries.

== History ==
HonestBrew was launched in 2014 by four friends (three from New Zealand and one from Australia) in Andrew Reeve's London apartment.

The business, was bootstrapped using £30,000 of the founders own money and also received an initial cash injection from the government's Start Up Loans initiative, it also raised £250,000 from leading food Industry experts and over £400,000 on the crowd funding platform Crowdcube.

In 2016, Startups.co.uk named HonestBrew number 49 on their annual list of the UK's leading Startups. HonestBrew also won the Startups Retail Business of the Year Award in 2015.

The company ceased trading on 14 June 2022 and appointed liquidators on 17 June 2022.

== See also ==
- Microbrewery
- Beer in the United Kingdom
