= Magic Rock Brewing =

Brewery in Huddersfield, West Yorkshire, England

- Company type: Subsidiary
- Industry: Brewing
- Founded: 2011
- Founder: Richard Burhouse
- Headquarters: Huddersfield, West Yorkshire, England
- Products: Craft beer
- Owner: Odyssey Inns
- Website: magicrockbrewing.com

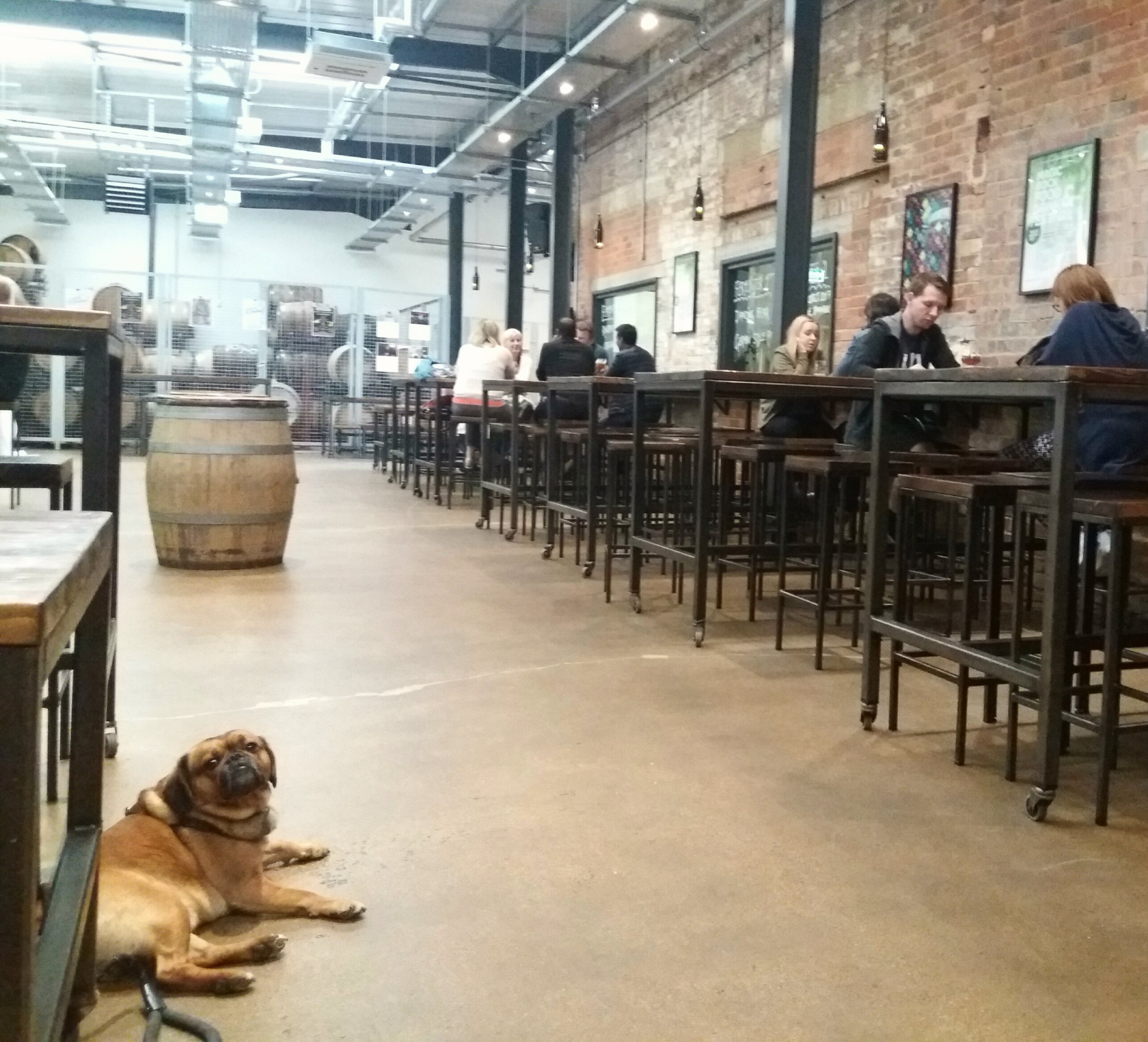
Magic Rock's brewery tap in Huddersfield

Magic Rock Brewing was an English brewery established in Huddersfield, West Yorkshire in 2011 by Richard Burhouse, aided by head brewer Stuart Ross. The company stated that it was inspired by both local brewing traditions and the US craft beer scene.

Magic Rock announced on 24 January 2025, that it had closed its doors for the last time, and the brands were subsequently acquired by Keystone Brewing Group.

== History ==
Magic Rock has been listed on Ratebeer's "top 100" list of world breweries on five occasions. It was also voted the second-best new brewery in the world at the website's "Top New Breweries" awards in its first year of operation. The company's brewery, which opened in 2015, produces 15,500 hectolitres of beer per annum, and its products are exported to over 25 countries. As of 2019, the brewery employed 45 staff. Its core range of beers includes Dancing Bier (German lager), Hat-Trick (blonde bitter) and Common Grounds (coffee porter).

The company's first taproom opened in 2015 at their Willow Lane brewery in Huddersfield. A second Magic Rock Tap opened in the West Yorkshire town of Holmfirth in December 2019.

== Ownership ==
In 2019, Australian beer and beverage company Lion acquired 100 percent of Magic Rock. Lion, which owns the Castlemaine and Tooheys brands, also bought the London craft brewer Fourpure Brewing in 2018. Lion's global craft beer subsidiary is named Little World Beverages, and also includes Little Creatures in Australia, Panhead in New Zealand and New Belgium Brewing in the United States.

In September 2020, Magic Rock distanced itself from an Amnesty International investigation that revealed Lion's parent company Kirin had "funded atrocities" committed by Myanmar's military. In a statement, Magic Rock said that Lion Little World Beverages, "does not have any stake in or control over Kirin’s operations in Myanmar".

In August 2022, Lion announced the sale of its UK operations, which include Magic Rock, to UK-based Odyssey Inns.

== See also ==
- Craft brewery and microbrewery
- List of breweries in England
