= The Great Yorkshire Brewery =

Brewery in Cropton, North Yorkshire, England

Coordinates: 54°17′24″N 0°50′29″W

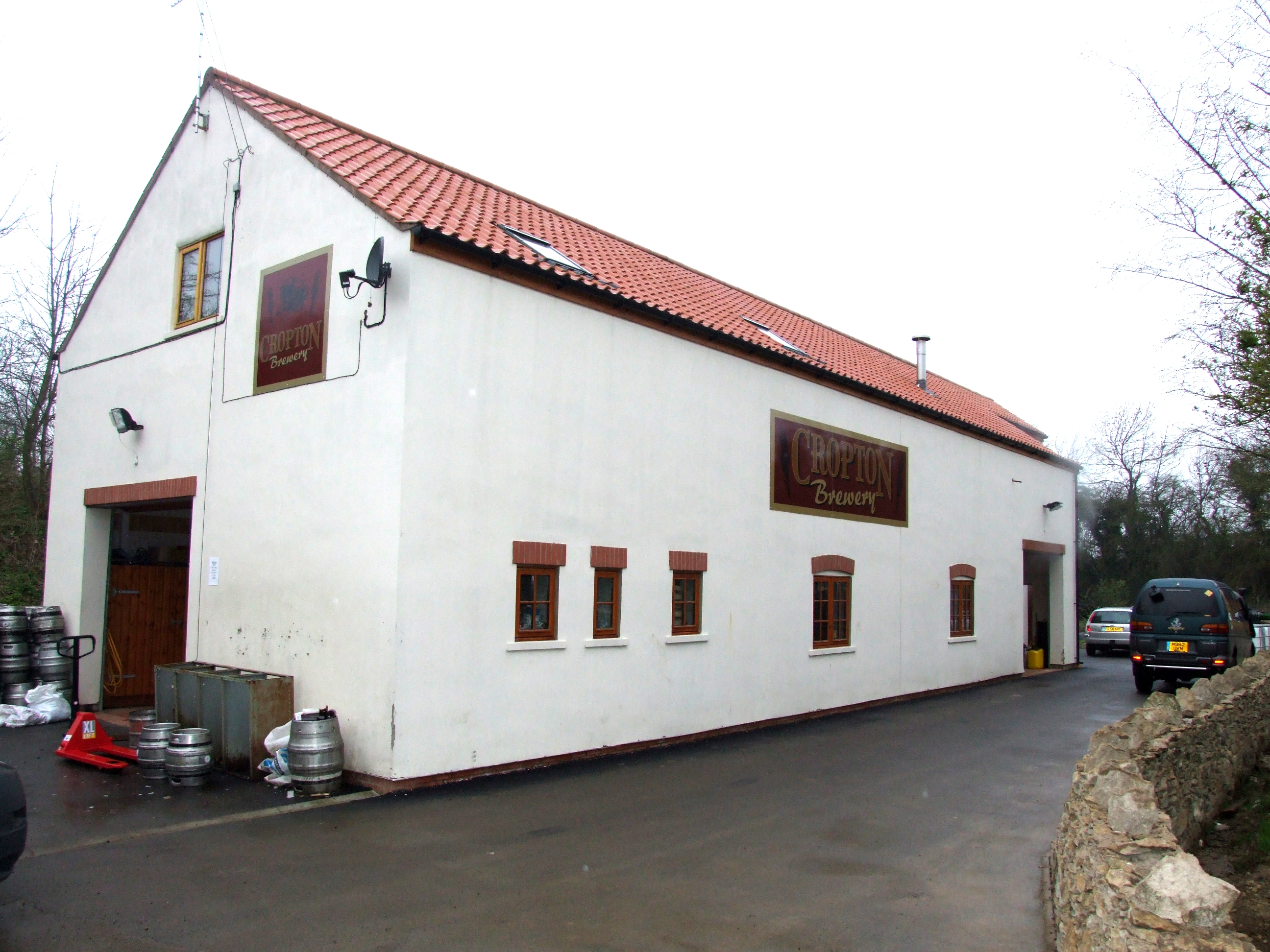
Cropton Brewery

The Great Yorkshire Brewery (founded as Cropton Brewery) is situated in the village of Cropton in North Yorkshire, England. Located within the North York Moors National Park, it is 2 miles (3.2 km) north-west of Pickering.

== History ==
The New Inn, in the village owned by brothers Paul and Phil Lee was the original site of brewery, in 1984, when Cropton Brewery was established in the pub cellars. The first beer brewed was called Two Pints and proved to be sufficiently popular in the local area that production was increased and supplies provided to other local pubs.

In 1994, the first building of the expanding new brewery was built on farmland behind the New Inn. Within a year production had doubled and the brewery released its first bottle-conditioned beer.

== Beers ==
The Great Yorkshire Brewery produces a variety of alcoholic drinks such as traditional lager, cider, golden ale and porter. It also brews a selection of craft beers or IPAs as well as special blends.

On St George's Day, 23 April 2008, the brewery released a new beer named Yorkshire Warrior. The beer was produced to celebrate the proud achievements of the Yorkshire Regiment and to commemorate the sacrifices the soldiers and families of the regiment have endured. The proceeds of the beer sales go directly to the regimental benevolent fund to help support former regimental members who require help following their discharge from the service.

== See also ==
- Beer in England
