= Peerless Building =

Building in Fresno, California

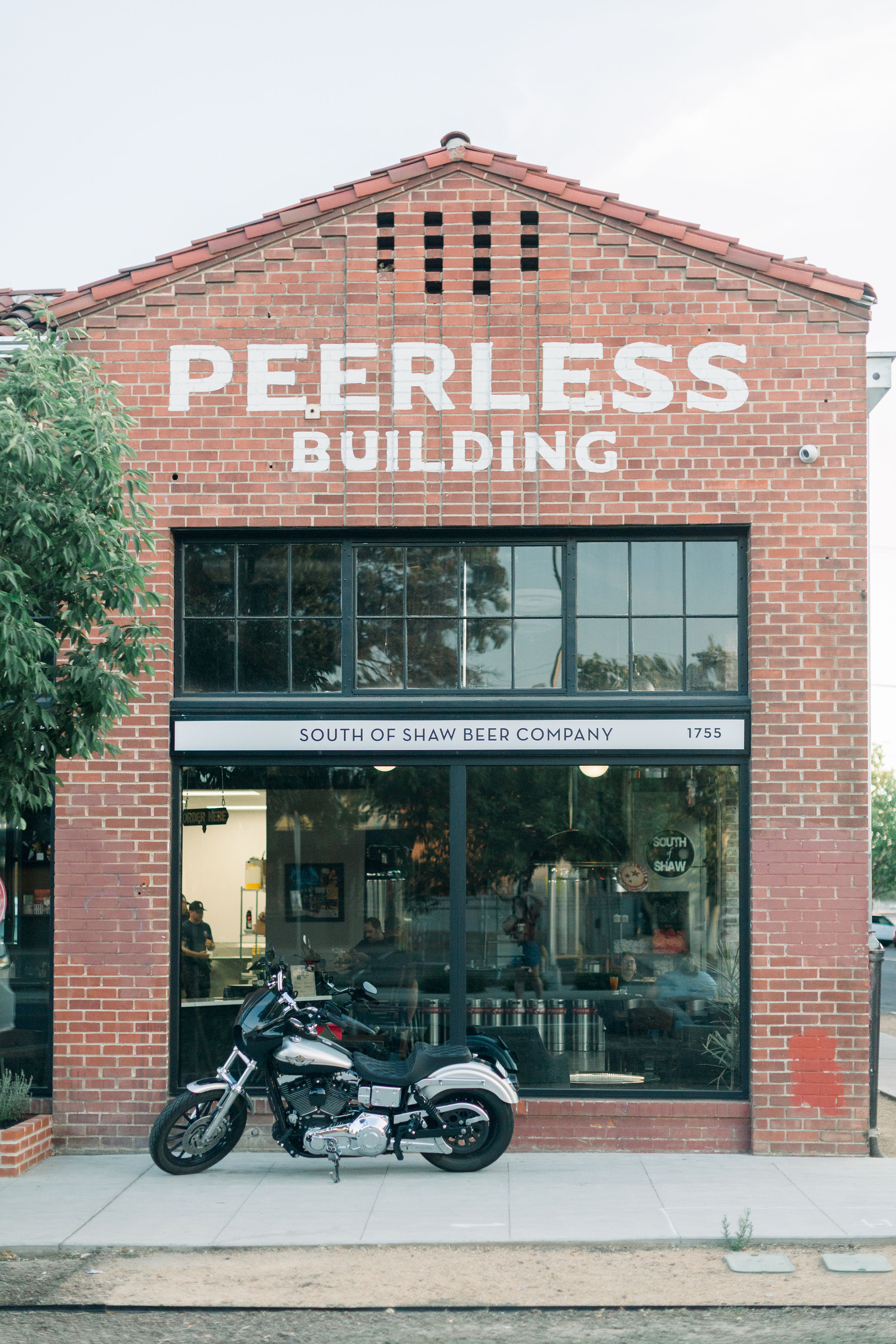
- Peerless Building in 2022
- Interactive map of the Peerless Building area

General information
- Location: 1755 Broadway Street, Fresno, California, United States
- Coordinates: 36.740740°N 119.799970°W
- Elevation: 308 ft (94 m)
- Completed: 1935
- Renovated: 2018

Technical details
- Floor area: 30,000 sq ft (2,800 m^{2})

The Peerless Building, at 1755 Broadway Street in Fresno, California, was built in 1935. Originally built for pump manufacturing, sales and service, it was renovated and reopened 2018 as a mixed-use commercial space.

== Location ==
The building is on the north end of downtown Fresno, adjacent to the right-of-way of the old Union Pacific Railroad.

== History ==
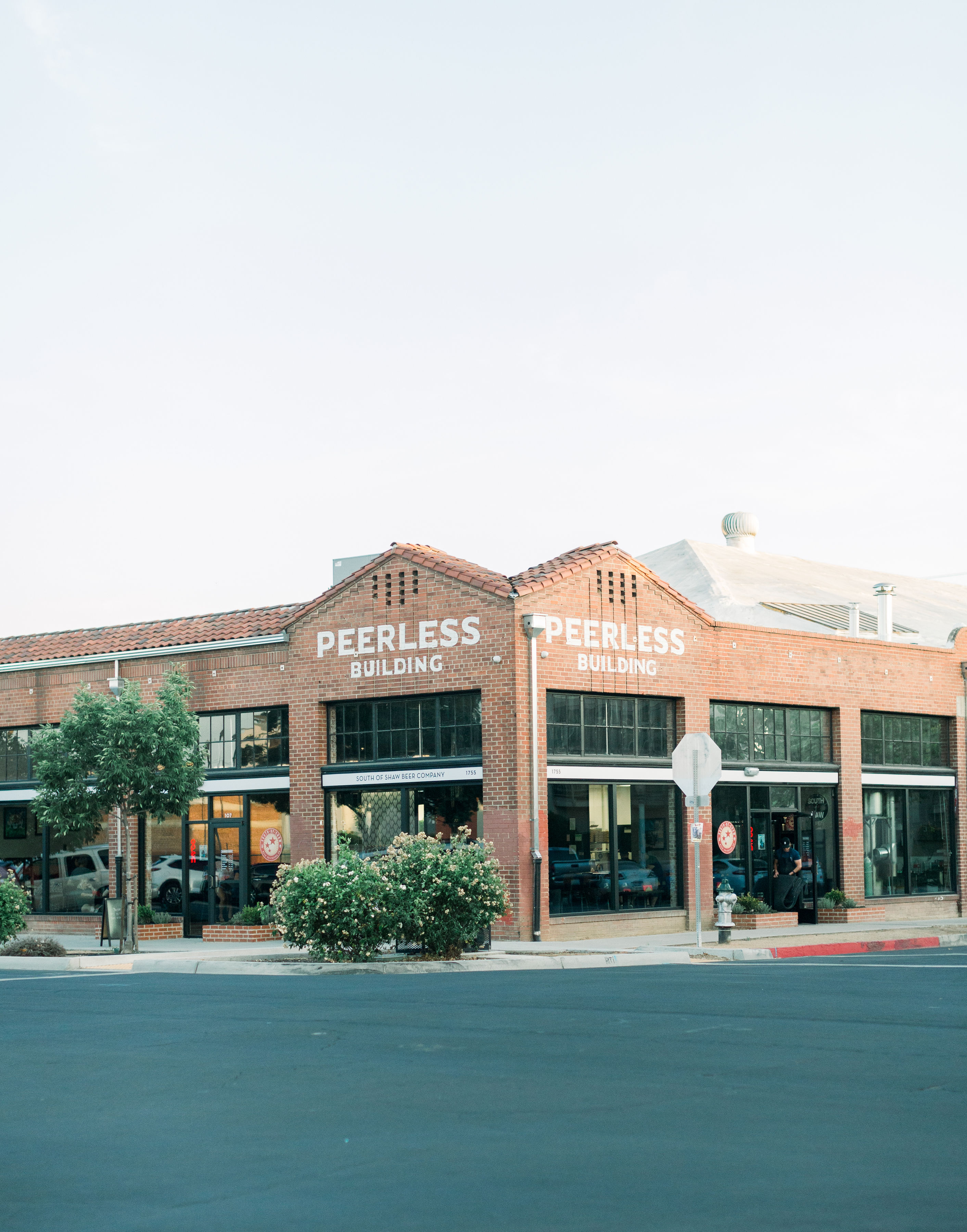

Formed in 1923 in Los Angeles, California, Peerless Pump was one of the original companies manufacturing deep well vertical turbine pumps for groundwater applications, particularly effective for agriculture in the San Joaquin Valley. Peerless Pump quickly expanded its operations and opened a factory in Fresno on 1225 Broadway Street, closer to central downtown. Operations moved to the former More-Pak building at Sacramento and H streets in 1930 in a lease arrangement while a permanent building was being constructed a block over. In 1935, the 30,000-square-foot Peerless Pump building was completed at 1755 Broadway Street.

Peerless Pump was acquired by FMC Corp. in 1932 and continued to assemble, sell and service pumps out of the Fresno facility. In 1976 FMC Corp. sold Peerless Pump to Indian Head. In 2007, Peerless became a wholly owned subsidiary company of the Grundfos group of Denmark. By that time most operations had been consolidated to other locations.

The Peerless Building was sold to a local developer and investor Nader Assemi, for whom the renovation of the building became a passion project. The building was re-opened to tenants in June 2018 and since then has grown to include retail, restaurants and office space. The renovation kept original artifacts such as manufacturing equipment and windows to keep some original character of the space.

== Events ==
The building is a site for community events such as a pumpkin patch for charity and the recurring Fresno ArtHop event.
