= Nottingham Brewery =

Microbrewery in England

Nottingham Brewery, is a microbrewery located in Nottingham, England. The name Nottingham Brewery refers to two different breweries in the Nottingham area. The first was established in 1847 and situated on Mansfield Road, next door to The Rose of England public house. The Brewery was demolished to make for York House, which itself was demolished in 2016. The current brewery was established in 2001 in Radford.

== History ==
Philip Darby and Niven Balfour established the brewery after selling their remaining half of the Castle Rock Brewery to co-owners Tynemill in 2001. They had previously established the Castle Rock Brewery under the name Bramcote Brewery in 1996. After rapid expansion they moved to larger premises next to the Vat & Fiddle public house in 1998 and sold 50% to Tynemill, owners of the Vat & Fiddle.

In 2001 Philip and Niven decided to go it alone once more and sold their remaining share in Castle Rock to Tynemill. Meanwhile, they purchased the Plough public house in Radford, Nottingham and spent several months converting the outbuildings to a ten barrel plant. The Plough had previously been owned by the older Nottingham Brewery and it was decided to resurrect the name and brands which had become available for use once more. The original brewery had closed in 1952 after being taken over by Tennant Brothers who in turn were bought out by Whitbread. In Whitbread's subsequent takeover by Interbrew the names were no longer owned by any brewing company and were adopted for the 21st century revival.

=== 19th Century ===
The brewery was situated at 52/56 Mansfield Road, Nottingham where York House now stands. The origins of the Brewery can be traced back to at least 1847 when James Long was listed as an East India and Pale Ale Brewer on the site. He sold the business in 1875 and after passing through several ownerships it was purchased in 1879 by Edward Wheeler Field.

The brewery became a registered company in 1887 at which time it was recorded as owning many public houses of which several are still standing. For example:-

- Sun Inn at Gotham
- Great Northern at Langley Mill
- Sir Charles Napier on North Sherwood Street, Nottingham
- Old Silk Mill in Derby
- Vernon Hotel on Vernon Road in Basford
- Highbury Vale in Bulwell
- and, of course, The Plough in Radford

In 1887 it was decided to completely rebuild the premises to make it one of the best equipped in the country. Wm. Bradford of Carlton Chambers in London designed the handsome new building in a Grecian style. Overall the site occupied 21,000 sq. ft.

=== 20th Century ===
In 1900 the Wellow Brewery Company of Messrs. Lewis and Barker was acquired, along with 19 tied houses. This was located on Wellowgate in Grimsby and it continued to operate until it was closed in 1944. After this date the site appears to have operated as a depot for the company as indicated on a bottle label we have uncovered.

Nottingham Brewery soon established itself as the City's main brewery, serving fine ales to local citizens from its expanding estate of public houses. It also gained worldwide acclaim for transporting its gold medal winning India Pale Ale to troops of the British Empire across the globe. Two brand names were used and became well known both inside the city and further afield, they were "Maltanop" and "Rock Ales".

Nottingham is built on sandstone and beneath the city is honeycomb of caves. Indeed, the early inhabitants of Nottingham, "the snots" (hence "Snottingham") originally inhabited these caves (The Caves of Nottingham tourist attraction in the Broad Marsh shopping centre provides more information and chance to explore some of the caves). Beneath the brewery immense sandstone cellars were used as an excellent storage location for beers as the temperature never rose above an ideal 56 degrees Fahrenheit, this of course is where the name "Rock Ales" originated. When the Great Central railway was completed in the late 1890s it ran in a deep cutting behind the brewery into the new Victoria Station. In 1894 a long tunnel was built to enable the brewery to link their network of caves directly to their own sidings in the station. This facilitated the direct transfer of casks and crates of bottles onto rail wagons, placing Nottingham Brewery at the hub of the country's booming rail network and distributing their beers far and wide.

The brewery continued to flourish through the first half of the 20th century, and was sold to Tennant Brothers Ltd. of the Exchange Brewery, Sheffield in 1944 along with 150 pubs. Bottling ceased in 1948 and brewing in May 1952. On 15 June 1956 the Nottingham Brewery Company was formally wound up. The deed of conveyance and assignment to facilitate this lists all of the assets of Nottingham Brewery including details of all their pubs and this 29-page document can be viewed by clicking here

However soon after Tennants had closed the brewery it was bought by Whitbread who brewed their own brands there, the name "Mackeson" appearing on the brewery tower, until the site was sold to developers in 1960 and demolished. Ironically, Tennants were swallowed up by Whitbread in 1962, although their Exchange Brewery on Bridge Street in Sheffield survived into the eighties.

A concrete office block now stands on the site, although the cellars beneath still remain. However the brewery tap "The Rose of England" is still standing, right next to York House. It was built in 1899 by the celebrated Nottingham architect Watson Fothergill. It replaced an earlier brewery tap, Filo da Puta, named after the 1815 St. Ledger winner which when translated means "son of a whore"!

The 1960s saw a marked change in the beer market with the rise of large commercial breweries and the increasing popularity of mass-produced lagers; Nottingham Brewery struggled to maintain market share during this time.

=== 21st Century ===
But all things turn circle and Whitbread themselves became the target of a buy-out by an even bigger fish Interbrew of Belgium. This left the name and brands of the Nottingham Brewery available once again so local brewers Philip Darby and Niven Balfour saw the ideal chance to give the city its brewing name back and by delving deep into the archives, have resurrected some of the fine brews that gave Nottingham 'BEER TO BE PROUD OF'.

== Brews in 2008 ==
- Rock Mild (Dark Mild), 3.8%
- Rock Bitter (Pale ale), 3.8%
- Legend (Bitter), 4.0%
- Extra Pale Ale (Pale ale), 4.2%
- Dreadnought (Bitter), 4.5%
- Cock & Hoop (specially brewed for the Cock & Hoop public house) (Pale ale), 4.3%
- Bullion (Bitter), 4.7%
- Sooty Stout (Stout), 4.8%
- Supreme (Old Ale), 5.2%
- Foundry Mild (Dark Mild)

They also brew a range of one-offs and seasonal beers.

The brewery advises that their beer should not be served through a sparkler.
