= The Brew Company =

Brewery in Sheffield, South Yorkshire, England

The Brew Company is an independent award-winning craft brewery located in Sheffield, South Yorkshire, England. It produces a permanent range of cask ales as well as seasonal specials and house beers for pubs in the Sheffield area.

== History and location ==
The brewery was started in 2008 by Peter Roberts with support from Sheffield Hallam University's Enterprise Challenge. Before establishing The Brew Company, Pete studied brewing at Brewlab, which operates from the University of Sunderland. The brewery is based close to the Kelham Island area of Sheffield, which is often referred to as the 'real ale trail' due to its concentration of thriving real ale pubs and breweries.

== Awards ==
Spring Bock won 'Beer of the Festival' at the Sheffield All Stars Beer Festival on 12 May 2009.

Abyss Best Bitter won a Gold Award and Slaker Pale Ale won a Bronze Award at the Oakwood Beer Festival in February 2009.
