= Moles Brewery =

Brewer of ale and cider in Wiltshire, England

Moles Brewery was a brewery established in 1985, producing real ales at their facility in Melksham, Wiltshire, England. The business was sold to Wickwar Wessex in 2017.

Originally a mineral water producer in rural Wiltshire, the company developed specific real ales to diversify their business, and a custom-built 10-barrel plant was installed in the brewhouse at Bowerhill, Melksham. The new business was named Moles Brewery, inspired by the new owner's nickname. Moles Cask Bitter was the brewery's first real ale offering: an all-malt brew, with no sugars added. Black Rat cider was introduced in 1995.

In October 1985, Moles Brewery purchased the freehold of the Rising Sun on Bowden Hill in Lacock, and over time seven pubs were acquired.

In July 2017, on the retirement of the founders, the Moles brands were sold to Wickwar Wessex Brewing Company of Wickwar, Gloucestershire. The sale included six pubs and a drinks wholesale business, Cascade Drinks Limited.
