= Two Fingers Brewing Co. =

Two Fingers Brewing Co. was a craft beer brand and social enterprise based in Farringdon, London. The company was dissolved in 2020.

== History ==
Two Fingers Brewing Co. was founded by seven friends who met whilst working at an advertising agency in London.

In 2012, several of their colleagues were affected by prostate cancer. Soon after they learnt that prostate cancer kills roughly as many men as breast cancer does women, however, awareness and funding for prostate cancer is significantly lower.

Around this time, the company where they worked was moving to a new building with its own bar, so they came up with the idea to produce their own craft beer to sell within it and realised the opportunity to give back to the men that drank it by donating all profits to prostate cancer charities.

In 2013, the brand was launched nationally. The founders built a supply chain of partners who agreed to work at, near or below cost in support of the cause, as well as forming an official partnership with Prostate Cancer UK.

Two Fingers Brewing Co.'s first beer, Aurelio, went on sale to the public in January 2014. Notable retailers have included Tesco, Ocado, Morrisons, Jamie's Italian, and Club Gascon.

== Products ==
Two Fingers Brewing Co. currently sells one beer called Aurelio, but has stated ambitions to expand its range, giving each beer a man's name that describes the characteristics of the drink. Aurelio is a Latin man's name meaning "golden," because of that beer being a golden ale.

Aurelio is a 4.8% alcohol by volume golden ale, brewed with pale ale malt, crystal malt, goldings and admiral hops. Aurelio is brewed and bottled at cost for Two Fingers Brewing Co. by Hepworth & Co, the Sussex-based craft brewer.

== Design and branding ==
Two Fingers Brewing Co.’s logo features a hand pointing with two fingers, which is designed to represent an oath to better beer, in reference to the brand's commitment to great beer for a great cause, as well as a two-fingered salute to prostate cancer. The hand points into a black hole, in an irreverent reference to the digital rectal examination for prostate cancer, although this is performed with one finger instead of two.

== Awards and honours ==
- Best Craft Beer Innovation, International Beer Awards, 2014
- Selected as Official Beer of the 2014 Empire Awards
- Contribution to the Community Award, Nectar Business Small Business Awards, 2014
- Named one of the UK's 100 most resourceful, inspiring and disruptive small businesses in the Smarta 100 Awards, 2014
- Winner of a Business in the Community arc contest to win a London Underground advertising poster campaign, with an audience reach of over 2 million people and over 19 million opportunities to see
- Selected to run a pop up bar in Downing Street for a special Christmas market in honour of the UK's second Small Business Saturday, in December 2014
- Startup of the year 2014, The Guardian Small Business Showcase
- Winner of the UK Final of The Venture, Chivas Regal’s contest to find and celebrate the world's most innovative social enterprises

== Partners ==
Two Fingers Brewing Co. works with a network of partners in order to run its social enterprise. By role, these partners include:

- The UK's largest men's health charity, Prostate Cancer UK
- Sussex craft brewery Hepworth & Co.
- Marston's for storage and distribution
- Chesapeake for label printing, who have since merged to become Multi Packaging Solutions
- Sales support from Cube Business Services
- Insurance brokerage from Sutton Winson.
- PR by Persuasion
- Corporate legal advice from Brabners
- Electronic Data Interchange support from GXS, who have since merged to become OpenText
- Social enterprise support from the Business in the Community arc scheme
