= Penpont Brewery =

Brewery in Altarnun, Cornwall, England

- Location: Altarnun, Cornwall
- Opened: 2008
- Other products: Beer and ginger beer
- Owned by: Joseph Thomson, Stephen Medlicott
- Website: www.penpontbrewery.co.uk

Penpont Brewery is a brewery established by Joseph Thomson (at the time, one of the youngest brewers in the country) and Stephen Medlicott in 2008. It was built in converted farm buildings just outside Altarnun, up on the edge of Bodmin Moor, Cornwall. The beers are brewed using their own spring water near Penpont Water hence the name.

== Description ==
Penpont is a microbrewery which produces cask ales and bottled beers, using a mixture of modern and traditional British brewing techniques. They aim to use only high-quality natural ingredients to produce the best tasting beers possible. Many of the beers have won Gold Awards.

The brewery's Ginger Beer is one of their specialities using traditional methods same as for ales, but using ginger instead of hops. This has resulted in a clear rich ginger beer rather than the commonly cloudy alternatives. This beer was winner of best "Speciality Beer" at the SIBA South West Region Beer Competition, 2011. Although unlike many breweries they do not own any public houses, they do work closely with their local establishment, The Rising Sun. The Rising Sun hosts the annual event to celebrate the official birthday of Penpont Brewery, held on the first Friday of November which has become a well attended local event.

The brewery is well established in the local counties of Cornwall and Devon. Recently they have started exporting to Canada and Russia. Production has trebled in volume since 2008 and further expansion in 2013 is planned to meet export demand.

In 2014 Penpont Brewery launched Firebrand Brewing Co as a craft beer co-brand and on 30 June 2014 changed the company name to FP Brewing Ltd.

== Beers ==
- Shipwreck Coast is a mid-strength (ABV 4.4%), deep golden ale. Full bodied & fruity with tangerine citrus hop flavours. Named for the infamous stretch of coastline in North Cornwall and Devon.
- Beast of Bodmin Moor is a deep chestnut red ale, great complex malt flavours with a berry, fruity bitter finish. It won bronze for cornish strong bitter at the 2018 CAMRA Falmouth beer festival. ABV: 5.0%.
- An Howl is a strong (ABV: 5.6%) golden ale, with unique orange, melon, citrus hop notes, and a great mellowing malt flavour. An Howl is Cornish for the Sun. This ale's unique flavour has been recognised by gold awards at SIBA South West Beer Competition and Taste of The West Awards 2012.
- St Nonna's was the first beer to be produced, and is a dark and malty session ale with a moderate bitter finish (ABV 3.7%). St Nonna's is the local church in Altarnun.
