= Peerless Brewing Company =

Brewery in Birkenhead, Wirral, England

Coordinates: 53.3983°N 3.0255°W

- Company type: Private limited with Share Capital
- Industry: Alcoholic beverage
- Founded: 26 October 2009
- Founder: Steven Alan Briscoe
- Headquarters: Birkenhead, UK
- Products: Beer
- Website: www.peerlessbrewing.co.uk

Peerless Brewing Company is an independent microbrewery based in Birkenhead on the Wirral Peninsula, producing cask brewed beers by combining traditional techniques and fine ingredients with a modern tang.

The stainless-steel brew-plant is capable of brewing both ales and lagers. The Brewery brew about 3000 pints per batch. A gas-fired boiler provides the super-heated steam for the brewing process. The fermentation and conditioning tanks are all individually temperature controlled.

In early 2011 funding support from Wirral Council and help from Barclays Bank and the Manufacturing Advisory Service (MAS) provided £25,000 of capital which was invested in 220 new ale casks and cask washing equipment to support its production capacity and allow it to break into the national wholesale market.

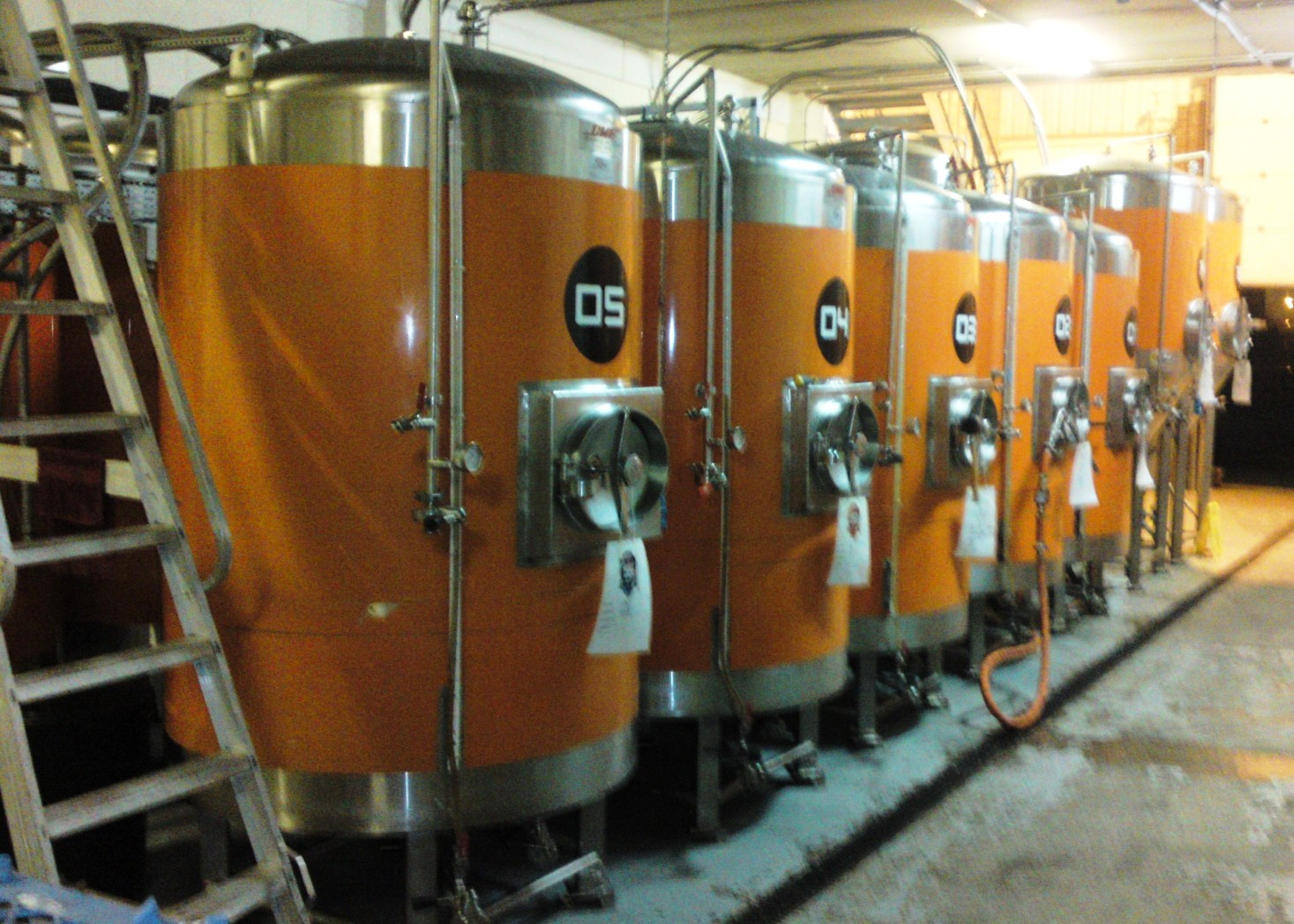

== History ==
The Brewery based in Pool Street, was the first brewery in Birkenhead since the closure of The Birkenhead Brewery, which operated from the mid 19th century until the late 1960s.

=== 2009 - ===
Following restructuring of the business, the brewery was renamed Peerless Brewing Company, with former Betwixt director Steve Briscoe taking over as managing director and Head Brewer joined by his wife Rose as a director. Two new employees were also recruited to strengthen brewing and distribution.

The Birkenhead Brewery strapline which inspired the name

Steve came up with the name 'Peerless' whilst having a beer with friends. The inspiration for the name came from The Birkenhead Brewery's strapline which was 'Peerless Ales and Stout'.

In January 2013 Peerless unveiled a new logo and pump clip design.

== Beers ==
=== Main Ales ===
- Full Whack a strong pale ale. The name is derived from the days when sailors would demand full rations. 6.0% ABV.
- Hilbre Gold is a hoppy golden ale named after the small island at the mouth of the Dee estuary. 4.5% ABV.
- Jinja Ninja brewed with root ginger, chillies and lemons. 4.0% ABV.
- Oatmeal Stout a smooth full bodied stout. 5.0% ABV.
- Paxtons Peculiar this peculiar copper coloured blend is part dark mild and part blond ale. 4.1% ABV.
- Peerless Pale this pale and hoppy brew coincided with the launch of Peerless’ new logo and pump clip design. 3.8% ABV.
- Red Rocks is a strong, ruby ale named after the famous sandstone point in Hoylake on the Wirral. 5.0% ABV.
- Storr is a pale and hoppy cask pilsner. The name 'Storr' is derived from the old Norse word meaning great or strong. 4.8% ABV.
- Triple Blond is a unique combination of three types of malt and three types of hop. 4% ABV.
- Viking Gold pale golden ale derived from Chinook and Goldings hops with citrus grapefruit and hop aroma. 4.6% ABV.

=== Other/Seasonal Ales ===
- All American a hoppy IPA brewed with American hops. 5.2% ABV.
- All In The Balance celebrating 10 years of the Brass Balance (Wetherspoons) In Birkenhead. 6.0% ABV.
- Crystal Maze a seasonal ruby ale. Bitter tasting with a hint of fruit. 4.4% ABV.
- Dark Arts a deep, dark beer with flavours of coffee and chocolate. 4% ABV.
- Dark Cascade a dry hopped version of Dark Arts using Cascade for a light, citrus finish. 4% ABV.
- Dog Leg an amber ale with malty flavours. 3.8% ABV.
- Down Under brewed with hops from Australia and New Zealand 3.6% ABV.
- Fugglehop a dry hopped version of Dark Arts using Fuggles for a light, floral finish. 4% ABV.
- Galaxy IPA brewed with galaxy hops. 4.8% ABV
- Hop Nob with an initial bitterness tempered by citrus notes from the use of Cascade hops. 3.9% ABV.
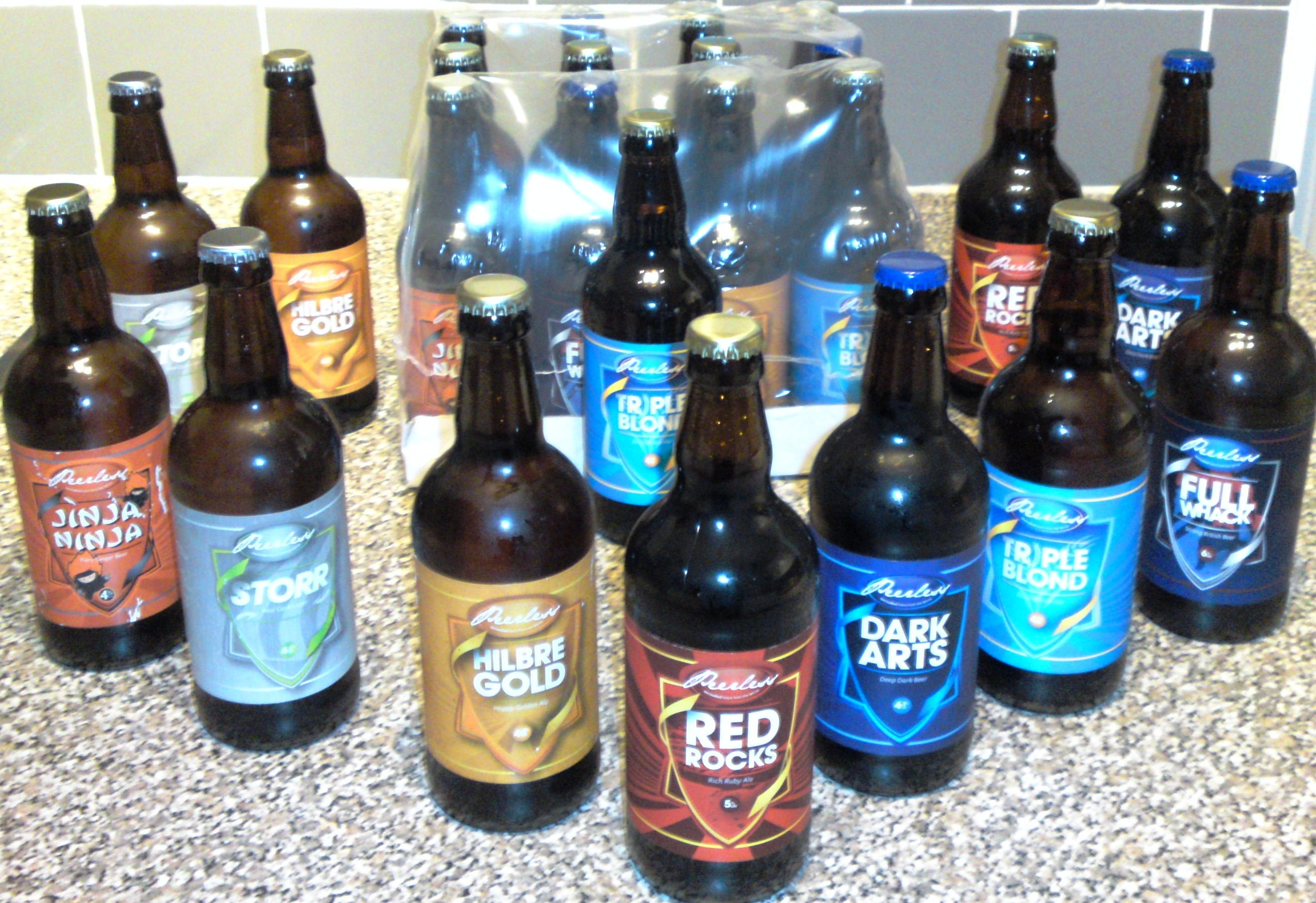
  Various bottled Peerless Ales
- Hop Tide a seasonal golden IPA. hoppy bitterness with hints of orange. 5.0% ABV.
- Ingimund 902 a seasonal Pale Ale. Named after Ingimundr, the first Viking to conquer Wirral in 902. 4.3% ABV.
- Jack Frost Blonde very pale blonde winter beer spiced with cardamom and coriander. 4.1% ABV.
- Kiwi Gold brewed with hops from Australia and New Zealand 4.7% ABV.
- Lone Rider an American Pale Ale brewed exclusively with American hops, Galena, Summit and Cascade. 4.0% ABV.
- Port Sunlight Seasonal malty amber ale with a hint of citrus from cascade hops. 3.7% ABV.
- Red Rockin’ Robin a deep red colour winter beer which combines Port Wine, cloves and nutmeg. 5.0% ABV.
- Santa's Sat Nav 4.8% ABV.
- Skyline an amber session ale with a hint of spice. 3.8% ABV.
- Solid Gold 5.4% ABV
- Uncle Sam made with crystal wheat malt and American hops. 4.5% ABV
- Watchmaker 4.4% ABV.
- Whiteout a pale winter ale brewed with pale malt combined with American Columbus and Summit hops. 3.8% ABV.
- Winter Wallop a strong Christmas ale. infused with Brandy, Cinnamon and Sultanas. 6.0% ABV.
- Winter Witch 3.9% ABV.
- Winter Whack 6.0% ABV.
- World Cup Blonde a light blond ale made with English Fuggles, East Kent Goldings and American Cascade hops. 4.0% ABV.

== Achievements/Awards ==
SIBA (Society of Independent Brewers) North West Regional Beer Competition 2013

The competition – held at the SIBA Great North West Beer Festival, Staveley – more than 200 ales over 9 categories were judged by a panel of experts which includes SIBA members, CAMRA experts and national food and drink journalists..

- 'Peerless Pale' achieved gold in the Standard Bitters category.
- 'Jinja Ninja' collected silver in the Specialty Bottled Beers category.

SIBA North Region Competition 2012

The competition – held at the SIBA Great Northern Beer Festival in Manchester – judged a total of 265 cask and 122 bottled beers across 13 categories.

- 'All American IPA' achieved silver in the Strong Bitters section.
- 'Storr' claimed silver in the Bottled Bitters category.
- 'Jinja Ninja' collected silver for Bottled Speciality Beers and bronze in the Speciality Beers cask class.

International Beer Challenge 2012

- After winning gold at the SIBA Awards 2011. SIBA put forward 'Jinja Ninja' for the International Beer Challenge 2012 where the ale achieved Bronze in the Speciality Beer category.

Jinja Ninja

CAMRA Liverpool Beer Festival 2012

- 'Storr' emerged victorious as the ‘best beer’ in a challenge for Merseyside's nine real ale brewers at the famous Camra (Campaign for Real Ale) Liverpool Beer Festival.* With beers judged by 70 ‘laymen’, Storr took the title well ahead of the closest runners-up by several points.

SIBA Awards 2011

- 'Jinja Ninja' achieved gold in its class of speciality bottled ales before being hailed as Champion Bottled Beer of the North
- In the golden ales category - 'Hilbre Gold' took first place while sister brew 'Viking Gold' won silver.

SIBA Awards 2010

- 'Full Whack' achieved the silver award in the strong ales category
