= Holdens Brewery =

Brewery in Dudley, England

Holden's Brewery
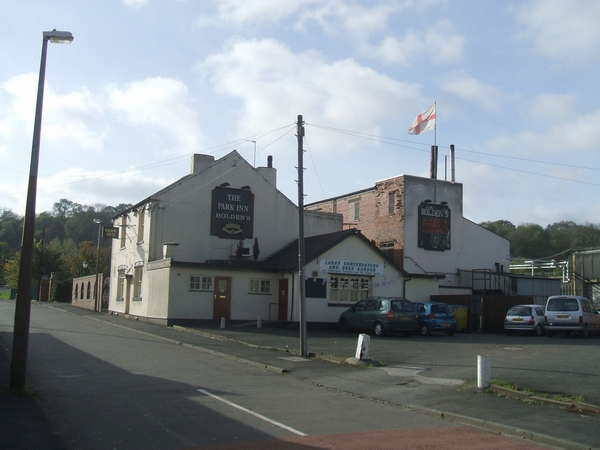
- Interactive map of Holden's Brewery
- Location: Woodsetton, West Midlands, England
- Coordinates: 52.531806°N 2.090750°W
- Opened: 1915
- Website: www.holdensbrewery.co.uk

Active beers
Name	Type
Black Country Mild	Mild
Black Country Bitter	Bitter
Golden Glow	Bitter
Black Country Special	Bitter

Holden's Brewery is a family-run English regional brewery. It was founded in 1915 at the Park Inn in Woodsetton, Dudley, in the West Midlands.

== History ==
Edwin Alfred Holden (1875-1920) and his wife, Lucy Blanche (nee Round), took over the Park Inn on George Street, Woodsetton, in 1915. Edwin was introduced to the pub trade by his wife’s family, the Rounds. Lucy’s mother, Elizabeth Round, ran the Park Inn before the newly weds took over it.

Edwin met Lucy Blanche some years earlier at his local pub, the Trust to Providence in Netherton, where Lucy worked as a barmaid. This pub was run by Lucy Blanche’s parents, Elizabeth and Benjamin Round. It was Lucy Blanche’s father, who persuaded the newlyweds to take on their first public house, The Britannia Inn in Netherton. Edwin had no experience of running pubs having worked with his father who was a Cordwainer. With the help and expertise of the extended Round family, who’d run many pubs in the Black Country over the years, he made a success of the enterprise.

Lucy Blanche’s siblings, Harry, Hagar, and William, all ran their own pubs. Harry (AKA Harry ‘Ossie’ Round) worked for the couple as a brewer after they acquired the Park Inn. The brewing equipment was enlarged from within the cellar to adjoining buildings which had previously been used as a malt store.After Edwin Alfred died in 1920 Lucy Blanche continued running the pub with the help of their son Edwin ‘Teddy’ Holden. It was Teddy who grew the business into what we recognise today. The Park Inn is still owned by the Holden family.

The 1940s saw the company's expansion and the establishment of Edwin Holden's Bottling Company. The 1960s saw the purchase of additional pubs around the Black Country, a practice that continued through the 1980s and to the present day.

In 2012 work began on a major expansion of the brewery to increase production capacity, with further plans to open up a visitor's centre in the near future.

The brewery, which supplies to several local pubs and sells its products in local shops, celebrated its 100th anniversary in 2015.

During the COVID-19 pandemic in 2020, Holdens began a home delivery service.

== Beers ==
Holden's brewpub supplies cask ale to its twenty-two tied houses. Bottle conditioned ales are also available.

There are four regular beers; Black Country Bitter, Black Country Special Bitter, Black Country Mild, and Golden Glow, as well as a stout and winter warmer. In 2017, the brewery also launched a beer to celebrate the life of industrialist Abraham Darby.

== Pubs ==
- The Park Inn, Woodsetton
- The Bell Inn, Staffordshire
- The Bulls Head, Sedgley
- The Chapel House, Lower Gornal
- The Codsall Station, Staffordshire
- The Cottage Spring, Wednesbury
- The Fellows, Dudley
- The Golden Lion, Bridgnorth
- The Great Western, Wolverhampton
- The Mill, Upper Gornal
- The New Inn, Coseley
- The Prince of Wales, Darlaston
- The Red Cow, Bridgnorth
- The Rose & Crown, Brierley Hill
- The Shrubbery Cottage, Stourbridge
- The Swan Inn, Cradley Heath
- The Trumpet, Bilston
- The Waterfall, Cradley Heath
- The Wheatsheaf, West Bromwich
- The White House, Hockley, Birmingham
- The Olde Robin Hood, Ironbridge, Shropshire
