= McMullen's Brewery =

Brewery in Hertfordshire, England

Coordinates: 51.7985°N 0.0803°W

McMullen & Sons Ltd
- Type: Private
- Industry: Brewing
- Founded: 1827; 199 years ago
- Founder: Peter McMullen
- Headquarters: Hertford, England, the United Kingdom
- Key people: Chairman: Stephen Gould; Joint managing director: Heydon Mizon; Joint managing director: Tom McMullen
- Products: Beer
- Owner: the McMullen family
- Website: http://www.mcmullens.co.uk/

McMullen's, known locally as Mac's, is a regional brewery founded in 1827 in Hertford, England. The brewery expanded during the second half of the 19th century by purchasing other breweries and their associated pubs.

In 1902, Mac's was the second largest brewery in Hertfordshire. The brewery has occupied several different sites in Hertford and moved to its current location in 1891. There have been several breweries on this site and the current one opened in 2006. As of 2021, members of the 6th generation of the McMullen family are still involved with the business.

== History ==
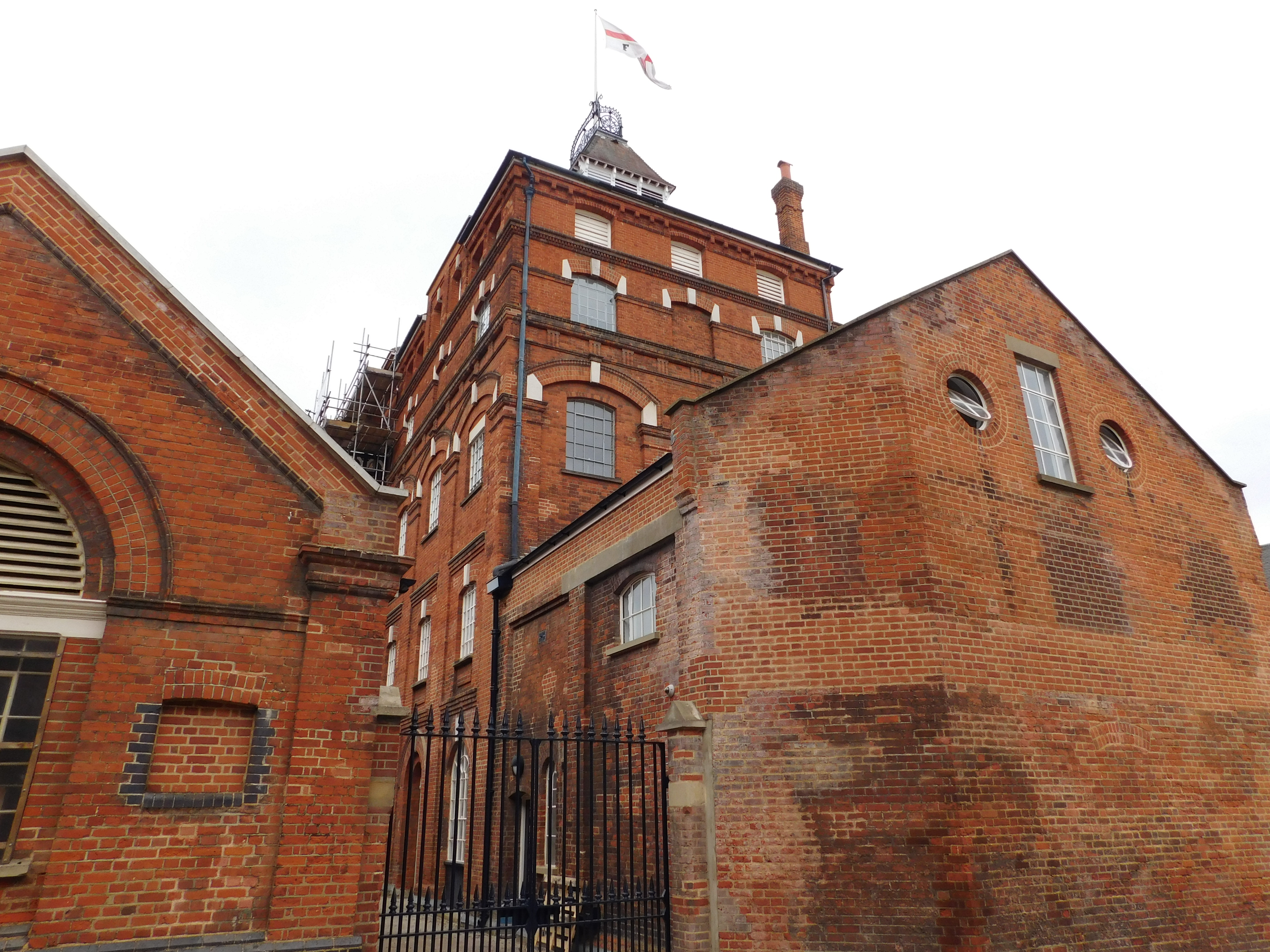
The former McMullen's Brewery of 1891 on Hartham Lane, Hertford

McMullen's was founded in 1827 in Back Street (now Railway Street) Hertford by Peter McMullen (1798-1881), the son of an Irish nurseryman. The passing of the Beerhouse Act in 1830 enabled Peter McMullen to open his own beerhouse named after William IV in Mill Bridge, Hertford. The passing of the Beerhouse Act acted as a stimulus to common brewing and led to an increase in the number of breweries in Hertford, peaking at eight in Hertford in 1838. In 1966 McMullen's were the sole survivor.

In 1860 Peter McMullen passed the business onto his sons Alexander Henry and Osmond Henry McMullen who began trading as P. McMullen & Sons. The company expanded during this period and acquired a number of local breweries. As the business grew it moved to Old Cross, Hertford in 1891 and a new brewery was built. The new brewery was designed by William Bradford and is now a Grade II listed building. In 1897 the brewery became a limited company, McMullen & Sons Ltd, when it owned 90 pubs. Osmond Henry became Chairman of the new company whilst Alexander Henry retired from the brewery and founded a seed merchant in Hertford.

By 1902 McMullen's were the second largest brewery in Hertfordshire, behind Benskins Brewery of Watford and owned 131 pubs Osmond Henry died in May 1914 and his son Lieutenant colonel Osmond Robert became chairman. Osmond Henrys's grandson Peter, a former Special Operations Executive colonel, ran the brewery from 1946 to 1980. In 1966 the brewery owned 200 pubs. A modern brewhouse was built in 1984 when John McMullen was company director.

From the 1960s until the early 1990s, Mac's also brewed a range of kids' soft drinks that were sold at their pubs and also in the local ice cream stands and newsagent shops. These included lemonade, Shandimac, ginger beer, lime soda, orange soda, and Maxi-Cola which came in reuseable glass bottles that could be returned for a discount on the next drink.

In 2002 there was a split between various members of the McMullen family some of whom wanted to turn their holdings into cash whilst others were happy to remain shareholders. Financial consultants were appointed and the company was put up for sale. The company was independently valued at £176m in 2002. A new independent chairman, Charles Brims, secured a compromise whereby several non-brewing property investments were sold in order to release cash to appease the majority shareholders and a plan was developed to build a new, smaller brewhouse. The company decided to shed contract brewing and take advantage of tax breaks by becoming a smaller brewer. As the new Whole Hop Brewery (opened 2006) was more compact than the 1984-built plant, the spare land was sold to Sainsbury's in 2007. This is the fifth McMullen brewery to operate on this site

McMullen's brews cask ale and pasteurised bottled beers. The company owns over 130 freehold pubs, mainly in the Home Counties, with a number in London, including The Spice of Life in Cambridge Circus, The White Swan in Pimlico and The Nag's Head in Covent Garden. McMullen's is acquisitive and has recently purchased pubs and bars in Cambridge, Chelmsford, Sevenoaks, Fleet, Marlow, Milton Keynes and Bishop's Stortford.

Due to the forced pub closures during the COVID-19 pandemic of 2020–21, Mac's began selling takeaway casks of beer directly from their brewery yard. The company has no debt.

== Beers ==
McMullen's produces three regular cask ales and several occasional ales. The regular range consists of:

=== Cask Ales ===
Cask ales are real ales that have been cask conditioned and will continue to ferment in the cask in a process known as secondary fermentation.

==== McMullen AK ====
McMullen AK is a mild beer with an ABV of 3.7%, brewed in Hertford since 1833. AK was once a popular designation for beers which were light in gravity and colour and lightly hopped. Brewed with a mix of malts with Kentish Whitbread Goldings the only hops used.

==== McMullen IPA ====
McMullen IPA is a traditional English IPA with an ABV of 4.8%. The hops used are undisclosed, but are added as whole leaf hops, as opposed to the compressed hops pellets more commonly used in non-traditional brewing.

==== Country Best Bitter ====
Country Best Bitter, first brewed in 1964, is a traditional bitter with an ABV of 4.3%, brewed with Fuggle, Progress and Bramling Cross hops and a mixture of pale malts.

==== McMullen Cask ====
McMullen house cask ale, in production since 2007, is a 3.8% ABV 'honey-gold' ale with undisclosed ingredients

==== Mac's No.1 Pale Ale ====
Number One Pale Ale is a 3.8% amber cask ale popular among agricultural workers since the beginning of the 20th century. It was previously advertised under the slogan "second to no-one", or "second to none", and was known as No.1 Bitter before 1950. Discontinued during the early 1990s, but brought back into production in 2021.

==== Bootwarmer ====
Bootwarmer is an old ale first brewed in 1995 and sold in McMullen pubs during the Christmas holidays from 2002 onwards. It was discontinued in 2019 due to the COVID-19 pandemic, but brought back in December 2021.

=== Bottled Beers ===
==== McMullen Hertford Castle ====
Hertford Castle is a 5% ABV strong ale brewed with Suffolk barley and undeclared whole leaf hops. First brewed in 1960, the beer is named after Hertford Castle, where Queen Elizabeth I of England spent much of her childhood.

==== McMullen Stronghart ====
A speciality brew with an ABV of 7%, Stronghart is made to an 1850s recipe with East Anglian barley and undeclared whole leaf hops and won gold in the 1997 CAMRA Champion Beer of Briton barley wine and strong old ale class. Originally known as Mac's Olde Time Strong Ale, it was rebranded as Stronghart in 1993.

==== Rivertown ====
The Rivertown range was introduced in 2017 to produce vegan-friendly pale ale, IPA and Pilsner. The Session IPA, at 4.1%, uses Citra, Waimea and crystal hops for a citrus finish.

=== Guest beers ===
- Isle Tropical Blonde Beer
- Rivertown Rival Velvet Stout (2026)

=== Out of production ===
- Rivertown Reed (2025)
- Old Bank of England Bitter (2025)
- Rivertown Tide (2025)
- Rivertown Daze (2025)
- Horse and Guardsman Bitter (2024)
- Rivertown Gade (2024)
- Rivertown Quin (2024)
- Nags Head Bitter (2023)
- Fit For A King Mild Ale (2023)
- Rivertown Elysium Lager (2023)
- Rivertown Ernest Amber Ale (2023)
- McMulled Beer (2022–23), a 4.4.% recreation of a 1976 recipe infusing Stronghart with apples, sugar and spices.
- Camra 1950 Porter (2022–23)
- Amber Bay IPA (2022–23)
- Rivertown Helles Lager (2022–23)
- Rivertown Solstice (2022–23)
- Jubilant 70 Golden Ale (2022)
- Normality (2021–22)
- Rivertown Freedom (2021–22)
- Mac's Oat Brown Stout (2020–21), a 4.4% ABV recreation of a beer produced at the Hertford brewery during the 1930s.
- Chinook (2020–21)
- OK Bloomer (2021)
- Hopguzzler (2018–19)
- Victory Stout (2018)
- Carriage Court Ale (2018)
- Golden Years (2017)
- Special Day (2015)
- Hop On A Mo(2015)
- Brave Herts (2015)
- Flying Frog (2014–16)
- Love Herts (2014)
- Bard of Ale (2013)
- Screaming Reels (2011–13)
- Stag Bitter (2008)
- Harvest Moon (2006-2008)
- Victory 1805 (2005)
- Special Reserve Anniversary Porter (2000)
- Oatmeal Ale (1997-2001)
- Gladstone (1995-2001)
- J.M Premium Bitter (1990s)
- Hartsman Lager (1980s)
- Crafter Low Alcohol Bitter (1970s)
- Mac's Stout (1960s-1970s)
- Mitre (1960s-1990s)
- Mac's Brown (1960s)
- Old Cross (1950s-1960s)
- Coronation (1953)
- Family Ale (1950s)
- Lady Mac (1950s)
- Shandimac (1950s-1980s)
- No. 3 Special Pale Ale (1950s-1970s)
- Nut Brown Ale (1940s-1950s)
- Milk Stout (1930s)
- Oat Brown Stout (1930s-1950s)
- Dinner Ale (1920s)
- Dark Beer (1920s-40s), renamed Olde Time Ale during the 1950s and Stronghart in 1993
- White Label (1880s-1920s)

== Notable Pubs ==
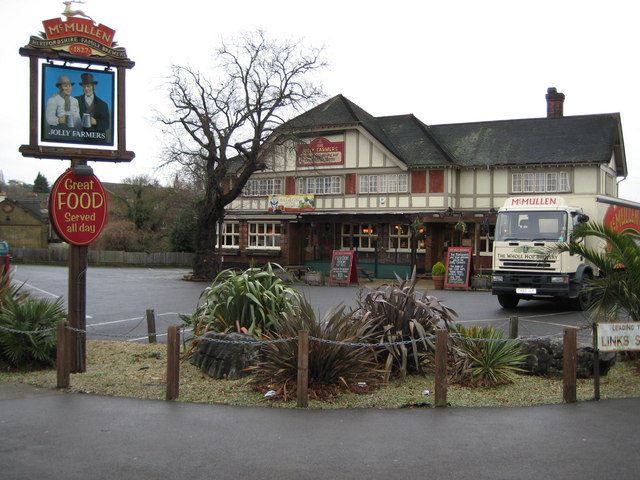
The Jolly Farmers, Enfield with a brewery lorry

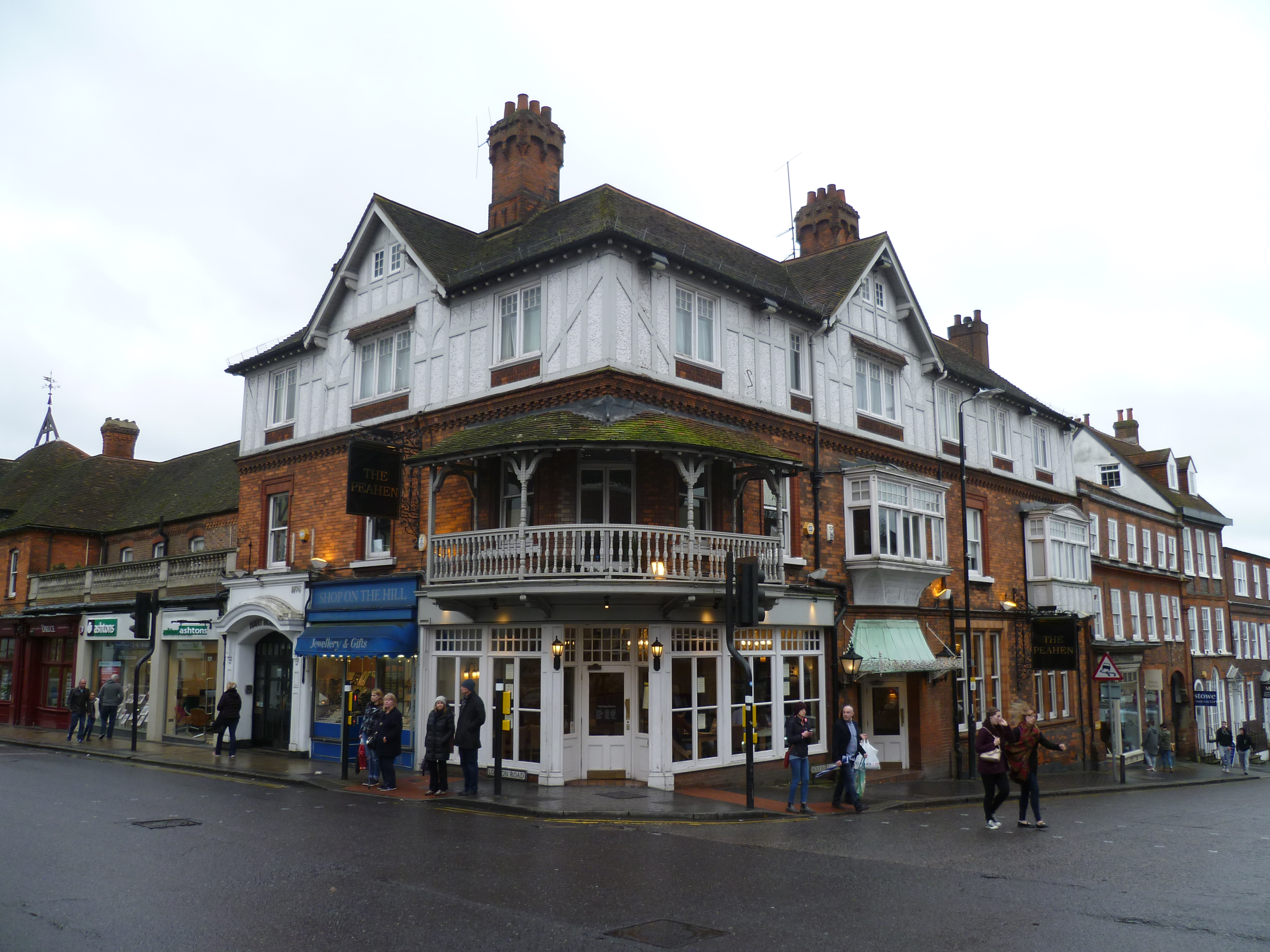
The Peahen, St Albans

- Anchor, Cheshunt
- Anchor, Hullbridge
- The Angel, Waltham Abbey
- Angels, Hitchin
- The Builders Arms, Potters Bar
- The Black Bull, Buntingford
- Baroosh, Hertford, Chelmsford and Bishops Stortford.
- The Hare, Harlow
- Bootmaker, Chelmsford
- The Bull, Broxbourne
- Bulls Head, Turnford
- Britannia, Marlow
- The Cambridge Tap, Cambridge
- Chadwell Springs Golf Centre, Ware
- Coach and Horses, Bishops Stortford
- Dog and Whistle, Hertford, formerly known as The Ram
- Duke of Clarence, Marlow
- The Duchess of Cambridge, Windsor
- The Duke of York, Fitzrovia
- Lord Haig, Hertford
- Duchess and Dressmaker, Brentwood
- Golden Griffin, Hertford
- The Greyhound, Bengeo
- Hatfield Tap, Hertfordshire
- The Harrier (The Hilltop), Hatfield, Hertfordshire
- The Hopfields Hatfield, Hertfordshire
- The Hollybush, Loughton, Essex
- The Horse and Guardsman, Westminster
- The Heron on the Lake, Fleet, Hampshire
- The Jolly Postie, formerly Royston Post Office.
- The King's Mead, Ware
- The Kingfisher on the Quay, Mytchett
- The Lock Tavern, Camden Town, London
- The Millstream, Hertford
- Nag's Head, Covent Garden.
- The Old Bank of England, Fleet Street, London
- The Peahen, St Albans
- The Plough, Crews Hill
- Polecat, Prestwood
- Practitioner, Hertfordshire
- Princess Charlotte, Colchester
- The Red Lion Hatfield, Hertfordshire
- Rose, Wokingham
- Salisbury Arms Hotel, Hertford
- The Sun, Hoddesdon
- Saracens Head, Ware
- Warbler on the Wharf, Milton Keynes, Buckinghamshire
- The White Hart, Hertford, Hertfordshire
- The Woolpack, Hertford
- The White Swan, Westminster, London
- The Yew Tree, Walkern
