= Old ale =

Style of beer

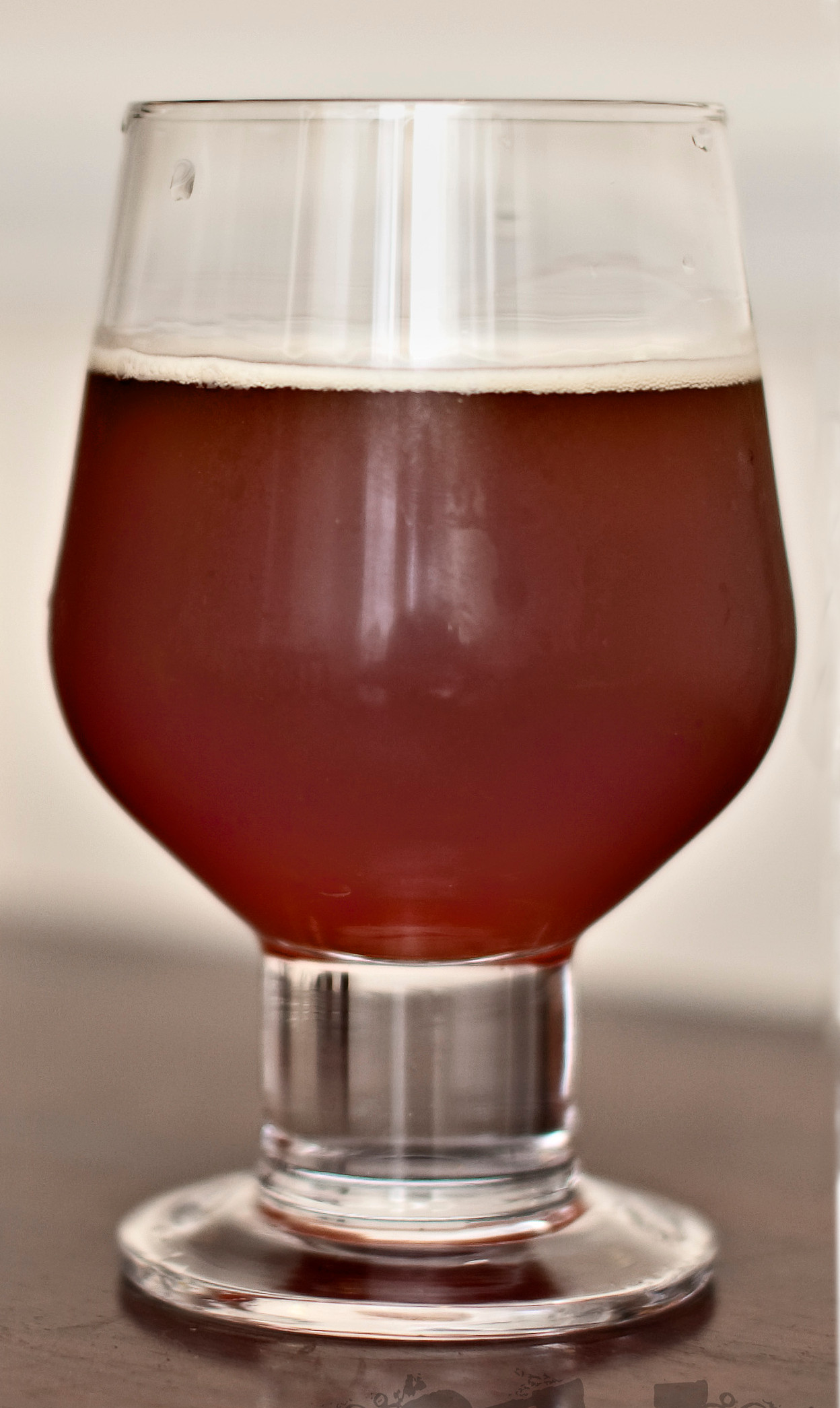
Founders Curmudgeon old ale

Old ale is a form of strong ale. The term is commonly applied to dark, malty beers in England, generally above 5% ABV, and also to dark ales of any strength in Australia. It is sometimes associated with stock ale or, archaically, keeping ale, in which the beer is held at the brewery. In modern times, the line has blurred between old ale and barley wine.

== History ==
Historically, old ales served as a complement to mild ales, and in pubs of the era typically the landlord would serve the customer a blend of the sharper stock ale with the fruitier, sweeter mild ale to the customer's taste. In London especially, the aged ale would take on a tart note from a secondary fermentation with Brettanomyces yeast which was present either in the pitching yeast or in the wooden equipment. Because of the time required for the aging process, some investors would buy mild ale from brewers, age it into old ale, and sell it at the higher price. Eventually, brewers began to keep some beer behind at the brewery, age it themselves and sell it to the pubs. In some cases old ale was a blend of young and old. The "stock ale" was the brewery's very aged ale and was used to inject an "old" quality, and perhaps acidity to the blend.

== Burton ale ==
In London especially, Burton was a synonym for old ale.

== Winter warmer ==
A winter warmer is a dark, malty-sweet strong ale that is brewed in the winter months. The average alcohol by volume ranges from 6% to 8%, and some reach 10% or more. Christmas beer is a type of winter warmer, similarly strong in alcohol and usually spiced. Mac's Brewery in Hertford have brewed a Christmas beer known as Bootwarmer since 1995, and an old ale called Stronghart since the 1850s.

== Variations ==
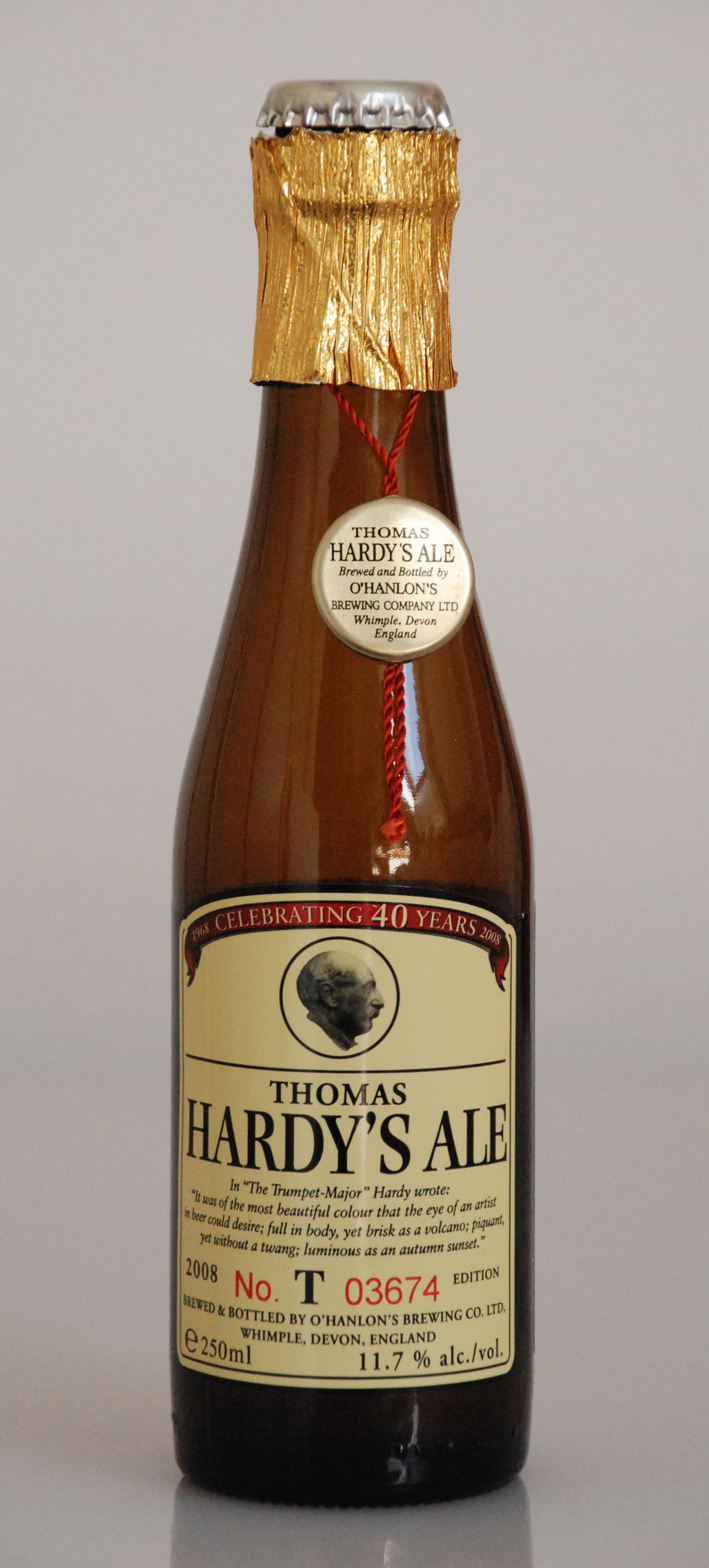
Thomas Hardy's Ale (11.7% ABV)

Some brewers will make a strong old ale for bottling. Some of these can mature for several years after bottling, and may or may not be bottle-conditioned.

The "October" keeping ales are thought to have formed the basis for India pale ales shipped by the British East India Company.

Another historic version was so-called "majority ale", a strong ale brewed on or around the birth of a child, and intended to be drunk on the child's twenty-first birthday.

Some old ales blended older vintages with fresh beer in vats, on the solera system. Burton Ale brewed by the Ballantine brewery (Newark, New Jersey) was such a beer, and kept in production as a gift item for distributors and VIPs up until the closing of the brewery in 1972. The only surviving representatives are Greene King 5X and The Bruery's anniversary ales. Sour old ales fermented with Brettanomyces yeast were popular in 19th-century Britain. The style is now associated more with Belgian brewing, for instance oud bruin and Rodenbach Grand Cru, although there is one surviving British example, Gales Prize Old Ale.

A number of breweries, particularly in Sussex, produce a weaker style of old ale with some resemblance to a mild ale. (Note: The boundary between old ale and mild is blurry, simply because, historically, old ale was mild ale, but aged.) Examples include King and Barnes (later W. J King) (4.5% ABV) and Harveys (4.3% ABV) These are typically consumed on draught dispense.
