= The Peacocks =

The Peacocks may refer to:

== Music ==
- The Peacocks (album), a 1975 album by Stan Getz and Jimmie Rowles
- The Peacocks (Backup band), an American backup band with Jack White

== Other uses ==
- The Peacocks (Woking), a shopping centre near London, England (now Victoria Place)
- Leeds United F.C., an association football club from Yorkshire, England

== See also ==
- Peacocks (disambiguation)
- Peafowl, the eponymic bird
- The Peahen, a pub in St. Albans, South East England
