= The Old Bank of England =

Pub in Fleet Street, London

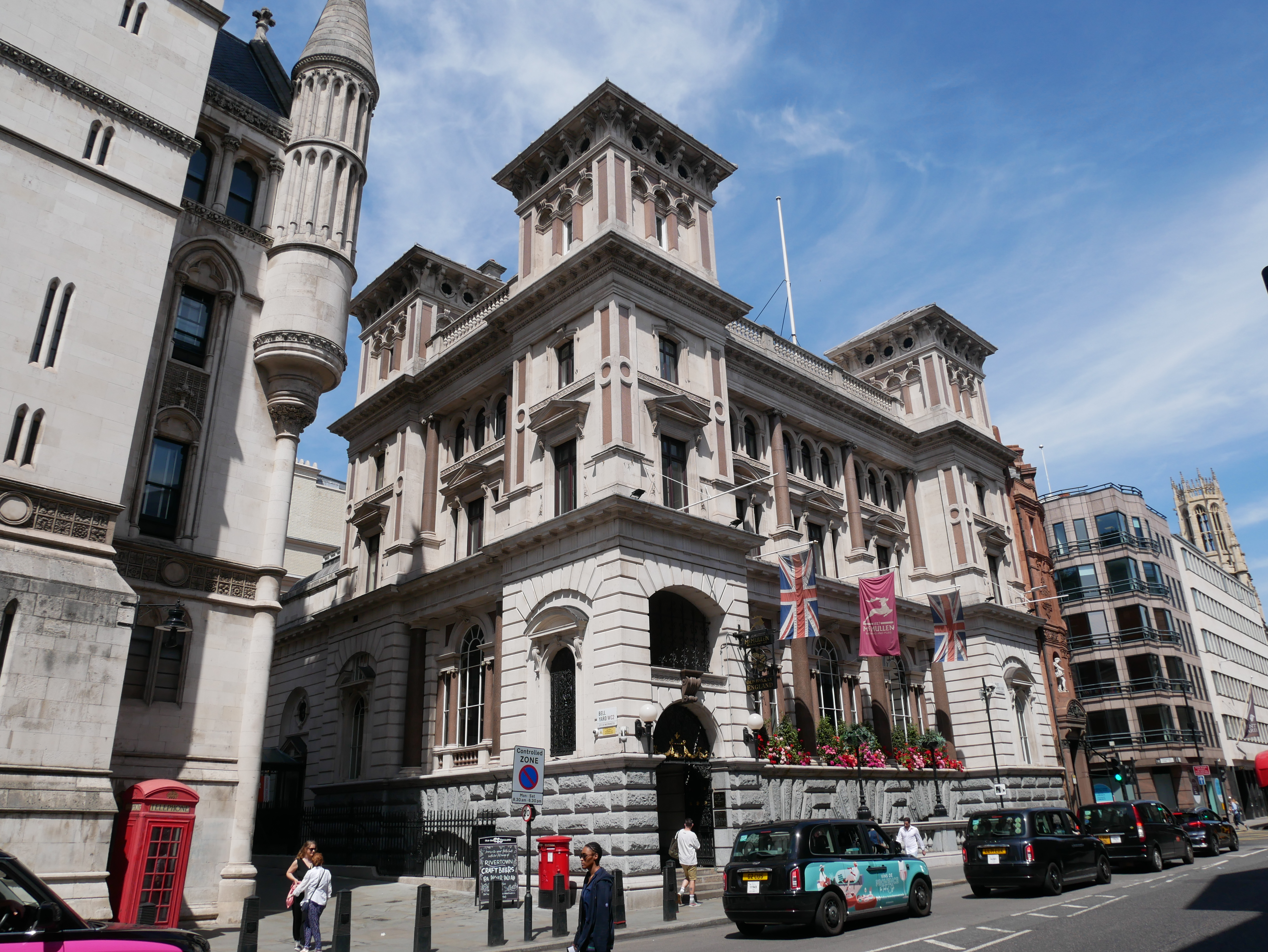
- Southwest view of the Old Bank of England in Fleet Street
- Interactive map of The Old Bank of England
- Coordinates: 51°30′50.27″N 0°6′41.35″W
- Location: 194 Fleet Street

History
- Built: 1886

Site notes
- Architect: Sir Arthur Blomfield
- Architectural style: Italianate

Listed Building – Grade II
- Official name: THE OLD BANK OF ENGLAND
- Designated: 05-Jun-1972
- Reference no.: 1192681

The Old Bank of England is a public house at 194 Fleet Street, where the City of London meets the City of Westminster.

It was constructed on a corner site in 1886 by Sir Arthur Blomfield in a grand Italianate style, the interior having three large chandeliers with a detailed plaster ceiling. It is a Grade II listed building.

The building was occupied by the Law Courts branch of the Bank of England from 1888 to 1975 before it was refurbished and put to its current use in 1994. The vaults beneath the pub once contained gold bullion, and are said to have held the Crown Jewels for a period as well. The pub is close to where the fictional Sweeney Todd is said to have plied his trade.

The pub is currently operated by McMullen's Brewery.

== See also ==
- List of pubs in London
