= Keith Moon =

English rock drummer (1946–1978)

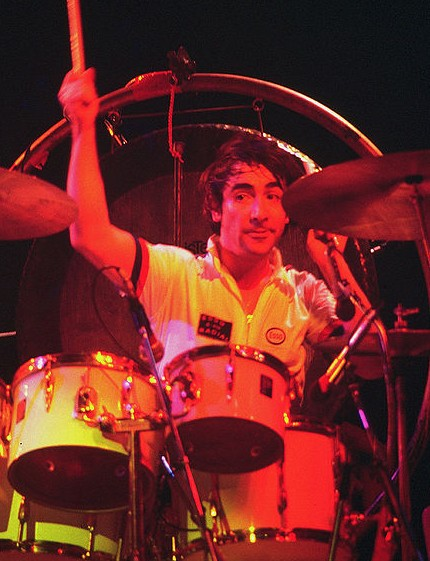
- Moon in 1975
- Born: Keith John Moon; 23 August 1946; Wembley, Middlesex, England
- Died: 7 September 1978 (aged 32); Mayfair, London, England
- Resting place: Golders Green Crematorium, London, England
- Occupations: Musician; actor
- Spouse: Kim Kerrigan (m. 1966; div. 1975)
- Partner: Annette Walter-Lax (1975–1978)
- Children: 1
- Musical career
- Genres: Rock; hard rock; power pop
- Instruments: Drums; vocals
- Years active: 1962–1978
- Formerly of: The Who

Keith John Moon (23 August 1946 – 7 September 1978) was an English musician who was the drummer for the rock band the Who. Regarded as one of the greatest drummers in the history of rock music, he was noted for his unique style of playing and his eccentric, self-destructive behaviour.

Moon grew up in Wembley and took up the drums during the early 1960s. After playing with a local band, the Beachcombers, he joined the Who in 1964 before they recorded their first single. Moon was recognised for his drumming style, which emphasised tom-toms, cymbal crashes, and drum fills. Throughout his tenure with the Who, his drum kit steadily grew in size, and (along with Ginger Baker) he has been credited as one of the earliest rock drummers to regularly employ double bass drums in his setup. Moon occasionally collaborated with other musicians and later appeared in films, but considered playing in the Who his primary occupation, and remained a member of the band until his death. In addition to his talent as a drummer, Moon developed a reputation for smashing his kit on stage and destroying hotel rooms on tour. He was fascinated with blowing up toilets with cherry bombs or dynamite, and destroying television sets. Moon also enjoyed touring and socialising, and became bored and restless when the Who were inactive. His 21st birthday party in Flint, Michigan, has been cited as a notorious example of decadent behaviour by rock groups.

Moon suffered a number of setbacks during the 1970s, most notably the accidental death of chauffeur Neil Boland and the breakdown of his marriage. He suffered from alcoholism and acquired a reputation for decadence and dark humour; his nickname was "Moon the Loon". While touring with the Who, on several occasions he passed out on stage and was hospitalised. By the time of their final tour with him in 1976, and particularly during production of the studio album Who Are You (1978) and the concert film The Kids Are Alright, his deterioration was evident. Moon moved back to London from Los Angeles in 1978, dying that September from an overdose of clomethiazole, a drug intended to treat or prevent symptoms of alcohol withdrawal. His drumming continues to be praised by critics and musicians, and he was posthumously inducted into the Modern Drummer Hall of Fame in 1982, becoming the second rock drummer to be chosen, and in 2011 he was voted the second-greatest drummer in history by a Rolling Stone readers' poll. Moon was inducted into the Rock and Roll Hall of Fame in 1990 as a member of the Who.

== Early life ==
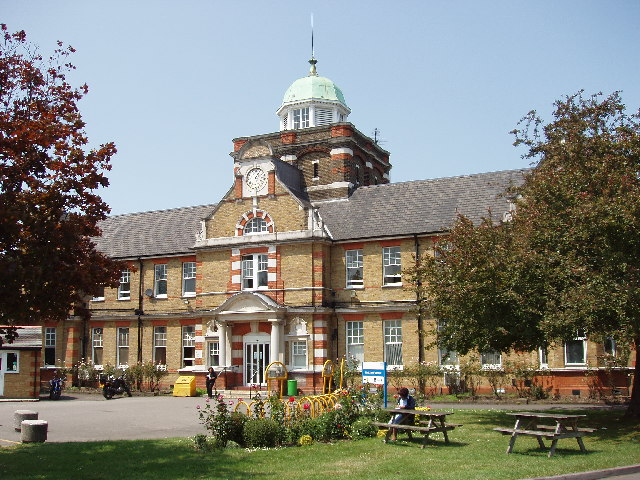
Central Middlesex Hospital, Moon's place of birth

Keith John Moon was born to motor mechanic Alfred Charles Moon and Kathleen Winifred ("Kit") (née Hopley), on 23 August 1946 at Central Middlesex Hospital in northwest London; he grew up in Chaplin Road, Wembley. Moon was hyperactive as a boy, with a restless imagination and a particular fondness for music and The Goon Show. Moon attended Alperton Secondary Modern School after failing his eleven plus exam, which precluded his attending a grammar school. His art teacher said in a report: "Retarded artistically. Idiotic in other respects." His music teacher wrote that Moon "has great ability, but must guard against a tendency to show off."

Moon joined his local Sea Cadet Corps band at the age of twelve on the bugle, but found the instrument too difficult to learn and took up drums instead. He was interested in practical jokes and home science kits, with a particular fondness for explosions. On his way home from school, Moon would often go to Macari's Musical Exchange at 46b Ealing Road to practice on the drums there, learning his basic skills on the instrument. He left school around Easter 1961, at age 14. Moon then enrolled at Harrow Technical College; this led to a job as a radio repairman, enabling him to buy his first drum kit.

== Career ==
=== Early years ===
Moon took lessons from one of the loudest contemporary drummers, Screaming Lord Sutch's Carlo Little, at ten shillings per lesson. His early style was influenced by jazz, American surf music and rhythm and blues, exemplified by noted Los Angeles studio drummer Hal Blaine. His favourite musicians were jazz artists, particularly Gene Krupa (whose flamboyant style he subsequently copied). He also admired Elvis Presley's original drummer DJ Fontana, the Shadows' original drummer Tony Meehan and the Pretty Things' Viv Prince. Moon also enjoyed singing, and had a particular interest in Motown. Moon idolised the Beach Boys; Roger Daltrey later said that, given the opportunity, Moon would have left to play for the California band even at the peak of the Who's fame.

During this time Moon joined his first serious band, the Escorts, replacing his best friend Gerry Evans. In December 1962 he joined the Beachcombers, a semi-professional London cover band playing hits by groups such as the Shadows. During his time in the group Moon incorporated theatrical tricks into his act, including "shooting" the group's lead singer with a starter pistol. The Beachcombers all had day jobs; Moon, who worked in the sales department at British Gypsum, had the keenest interest in turning professional. In April 1964, aged 17, he auditioned for the Who as a replacement for Doug Sandom. The Beachcombers continued as a local cover band after his departure.

=== The Who ===
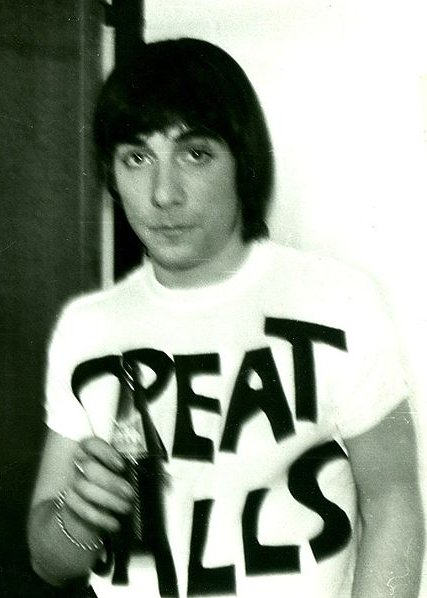
Moon backstage in Ludwigshafen, Germany, 1967

A commonly cited story of how Moon joined the Who is that he appeared at a show shortly after Sandom's departure, where a session drummer was used. Dressed in ginger clothes and with his hair dyed ginger (future bandmate Pete Townshend later described him as a "ginger vision"), he claimed to his would-be bandmates that he could play better; he played in the set's second half, nearly demolishing the drum kit in the process.

As Moon later recounted: "[T]hey said go ahead, and I got behind this other guy's drums and did one song—'Road Runner.' I'd several drinks to get me courage up and when I got onstage I went arrgggGhhhh on the drums, broke the bass drum pedal and two skins, and got off. I figured that was it. I was scared to death. Afterwards I was sitting at the bar and Pete came over. He said: 'You ... come 'ere.' I said, mild as you please: 'Yes, yes?' And Roger, who was the spokesman then, said: 'What are you doing next Monday?' I said: 'Nothing.' I was working during the day, selling plaster. He said: 'You'll have to give up work ... there's this gig on Monday. If you want to come, we'll pick you up in the van.' I said: 'Right.' And that was it." Moon later claimed that he was never formally invited to join the Who permanently; when Ringo Starr asked how he had joined the band, he said he had "just been filling in for the last fifteen years".

Moon's arrival in the Who changed the dynamics of the group. Sandom had generally been the peacemaker as Daltrey and Townshend feuded between themselves, but because of Moon's temperament the group now had four members frequently in conflict. "We used to fight regularly", remembered Moon in later years. "John [Entwistle] and I used to have fights—it wasn't very serious, it was more of an emotional spur-of-the moment thing." Moon also clashed with Daltrey and Townshend: "We really have absolutely nothing in common apart from music", he said in a later interview. Although Townshend described him as a "completely different person to anyone I've ever met", the pair had a rapport in the early years and enjoyed practical jokes and improvised comedy. Moon's drumming style affected the band's musical structure; although Entwistle initially found Moon's lack of conventional timekeeping problematic, it created an original sound.

Moon was particularly fond of touring since it was his only chance to regularly socialise with his bandmates, and was generally restless and bored when not playing live. This later carried over to other aspects of his life, as he acted them out (according to journalist and Who biographer Dave Marsh) "as if his life were one long tour". These antics earned him the nickname "Moon the Loon".

==== Musical contributions ====
I suppose as a drummer, I'm adequate. I've got no real aspirations to be a great drummer. I just want to play drums for the Who and that's it.

— Keith Moon, Melody Maker, September 1970

Moon's style of drumming was considered unique by his bandmates, although they sometimes found his unconventional playing frustrating; Entwistle noted that he tended to play faster or slower according to his mood. "He wouldn't play across his kit", he later added. "He'd play zig-zag. That's why he had two sets of tom-toms. He'd move his arms forward like a skier." Daltrey said that Moon "just instinctively put drum fills in places that other people would never have thought of putting them".

Who biographer John Atkins wrote that the group's early test sessions for Pye Records in 1964 show that "they seemed to have understood just how important was ... Moon's contribution." Contemporary critics questioned his ability to keep time, with biographer Tony Fletcher suggesting that the timing on Tommy was "all over the place". Who producer Jon Astley said, "You didn't think he was keeping time, but he was." In the opinion of Atkins, early recordings of Moon's drumming sound tinny and disorganised; it was not until the recording of Who's Next, with Glyn Johns' no-nonsense production techniques and the need to keep time to a synthesizer track, that Moon began developing more discipline in the studio. Fletcher considers the drumming on this album to be the best of Moon's career.

Unlike contemporary rock drummers such as Ginger Baker and John Bonham, Moon hated drum solos and refused to play them in concert. At a Madison Square Garden show during The Who's 1974 tour, Townshend and Entwistle decided to spontaneously stop playing during "Waspman" to listen to Moon's drum solo. Moon continued briefly and then stopped, shouting, "Drum solos are boring!" On 23 June 1977, he made a guest appearance at a Led Zeppelin concert in Los Angeles.

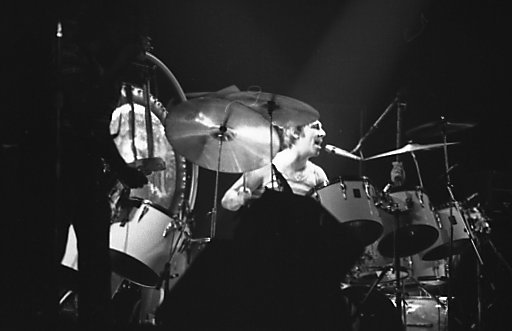
Moon singing at Maple Leaf Gardens, Toronto, 21 October 1976; he enjoyed singing whenever possible.

Moon also aspired to sing lead vocal on some songs. While the other three members handled most of the onstage vocals, Moon would attempt to sing backup (particularly on "I Can't Explain"). He provided humorous commentary during song announcements, although sound engineer Bob Pridden preferred to mute his vocal microphone on the mixing desk whenever possible. Moon's knack for making his bandmates laugh around the microphone led them to banish him from the studio when vocals were being recorded; this led to a game in which Moon would sneak in to join the singing. At the end of "Happy Jack", Townshend can be heard saying, "I saw ya!" to Moon as he tries to sneak into the studio. Moon's interest in surf music and his desire to sing led to his performing lead vocals on several early tracks, including "Bucket T" and "Barbara Ann" (Ready Steady Who EP, 1966) and high backing vocals on other songs, such as "Pictures of Lily". His performance on "Bell Boy" (Quadrophenia, 1973) saw him abandon "serious" vocal performances to sing in character, which gave him (in Fletcher's words) "full licence to live up to his reputation as a lecherous drunk"; it was "exactly the kind of performance the Who needed from him to bring them back down to earth."

Moon composed "I Need You", the instrumental "Cobwebs and Strange" (from the album A Quick One, 1966), the single B-sides "In The City" (co-written with Entwistle) and "Girl's Eyes" (from The Who Sell Out sessions featured on Thirty Years of Maximum R&B and a 1995 re-release of The Who Sell Out), "Dogs Part Two" (1969) and "Waspman" (1972). Moon also co-composed "The Ox" (an instrumental from their debut album, My Generation) with Townshend, Entwistle and keyboardist Nicky Hopkins. "Tommy's Holiday Camp" (from Tommy) was credited to Moon because he came up with the idea, but the song was actually written by Townshend and, although there is a misconception that Moon sings on it, the album version is Townshend's demo.

Moon produced the violin solo on "Baba O'Riley". Moon sat in on congas with East of Eden at London's Lyceum Ballroom, and afterwards suggested to violinist Dave Arbus that he play on the track.

==== Equipment ====
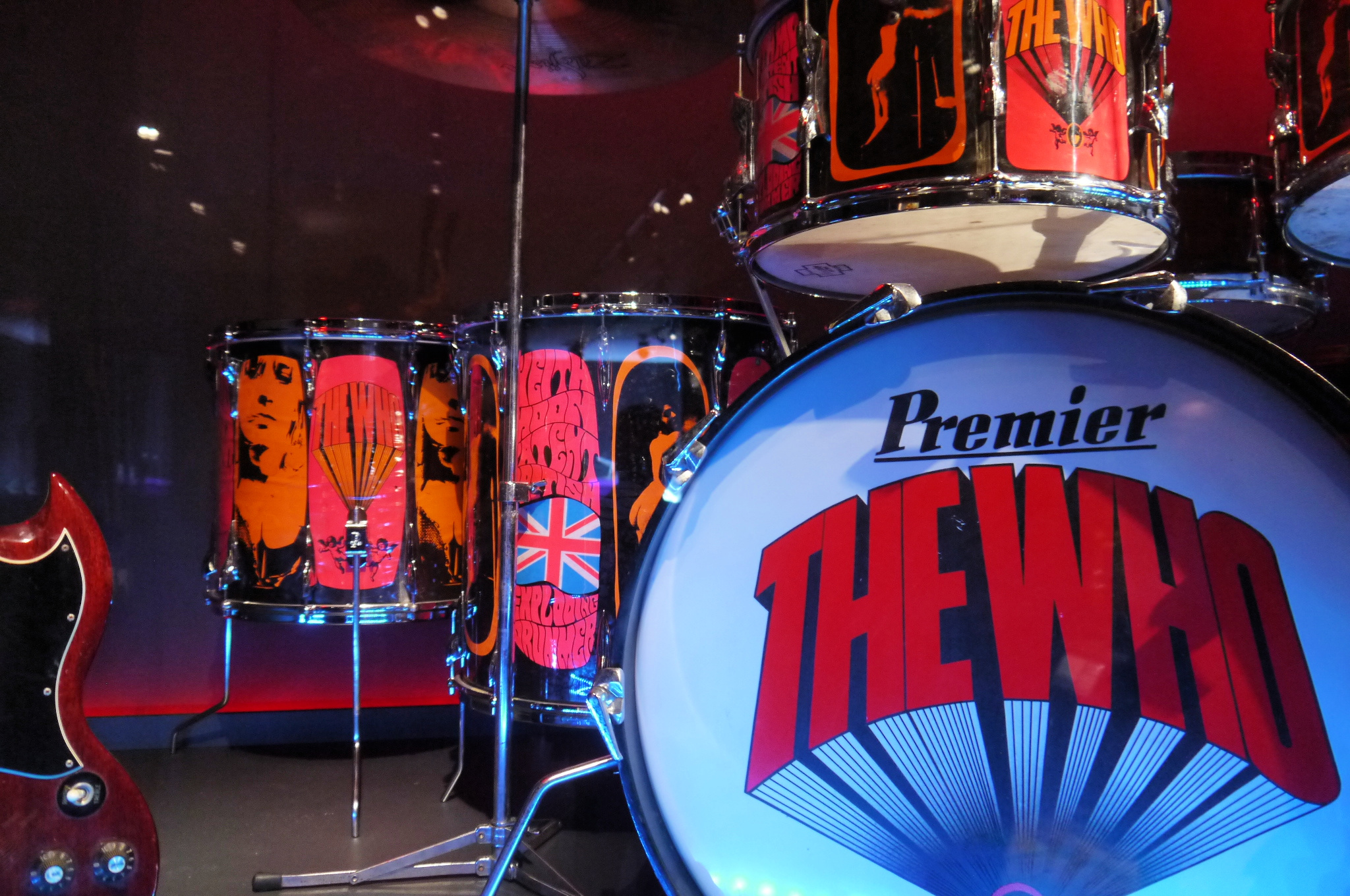
The "Pictures of Lily" drum kit, which Moon used from 1967 to 1969

Moon played a four- and later a five-piece drum kit during his early career. During much of 1964 and 1965 his setups consisted of Ludwig drums and Zildjian cymbals. He began to endorse Premier Drums in late 1965 and remained a loyal customer of the company. His first Premier kit was in red sparkle and featured two high toms. In 1966, Moon moved to an even larger kit, but without the customary hi-hat—at the time he preferred keeping ride rhythms with ride and crash cymbals, but he later reinstated the hi-hats. His new larger configuration was notable for the presence of two bass drums; he has been credited, along with Ginger Baker, as one of the early pioneers of double bass drumming in rock. This kit was not used at the Who's performance at the 1967 Monterey Pop Festival. From 1967 to 1969, Moon used the "Pictures of Lily" drum kit (named for its artwork), which had two 22-inch (56 cm) bass drums, two 16-inch (41 cm) floor toms and three mounted toms. In recognition of his loyalty to the company, Premier reissued the kit in 2006 as the "Spirit of Lily".

By 1970, Moon had begun to use timbales, gongs and timpani, and these were included in his setup for the rest of his career. In 1973, Premier's marketing manager, Eddie Haynes, began consulting Moon about specific requirements. At one point, Moon asked Premier to make a white kit with gold-plated fittings. When Haynes said that it would be prohibitively expensive, Moon replied: "Dear boy, do exactly as you feel it should be, but that's the way I want it." The kit was eventually fitted with copper fittings and later given to a young Zak Starkey, Moon's godson.

==== Destroying instruments and other stunts ====
At an early show at the Railway Tavern in Harrow, Townshend smashed his guitar after accidentally breaking it. When the audience demanded he do it again, Moon kicked over his drum kit. Subsequent live sets culminated in what the band later described as "auto-destructive art", in which band members (particularly Moon and Townshend) elaborately destroyed their equipment. Moon developed a habit of kicking over his drums, claiming that he did so in exasperation at an audience's indifference. Townshend later said, "A set of skins is about $300 [then £96] and after every show he'd just go bang, bang, bang and then kick the whole thing over."

In May 1966, Moon discovered that the Beach Boys' Bruce Johnston was visiting London. After the pair socialised for a few days, Moon and Entwistle brought Johnston to the set of Ready Steady Go!, which made them late for a show with the Who that evening. During the finale of "My Generation", an altercation broke out on stage between Moon and Townshend which was reported on the front page of the New Musical Express the following week. Moon and Entwistle left the Who for a week (with Moon hoping to join the Animals or the Nashville Teens), but they changed their minds and returned.

On the Who's early US package tour at the RKO 58th Street Theatre in New York in March and April 1967, Moon performed two or three shows a day, kicking over his drum kit after every show. Later that year, during their appearance on The Smothers Brothers Comedy Hour, he bribed a stagehand to load gunpowder into one of his bass drums; the stagehand used about ten times the standard amount. During the finale of "My Generation", he set off the charge. The intensity of the explosion singed Townshend's hair and embedded a piece of cymbal in Moon's arm. A clip of the incident became the opening scene for the film The Kids Are Alright.

Although Moon was known for kicking over his drum kit, Haynes said that he did this carefully and the kit rarely needed repairs. However, stands and foot pedals were frequently replaced; Moon "would go through them like a knife through butter".

=== Other work ===
==== Music ====
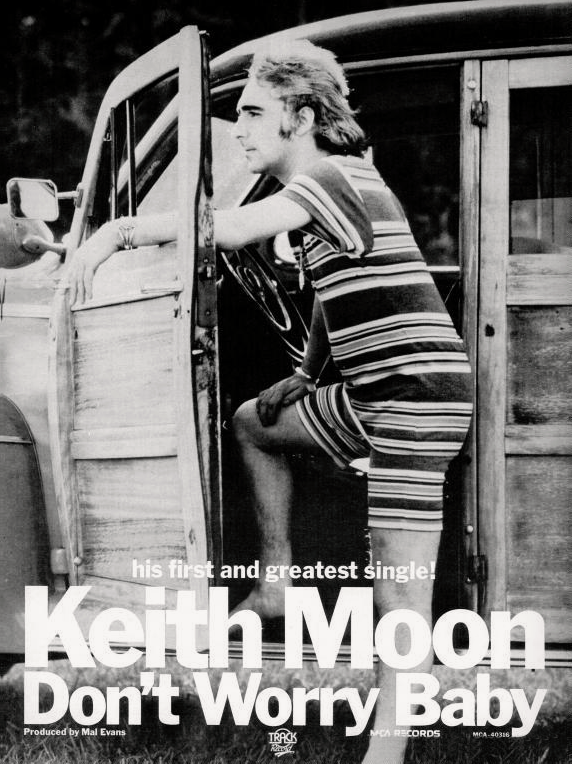
Advertisement for "Don't Worry Baby", 1974

While Moon generally said he was only interested in working with the Who, he participated in outside musical projects. In 1966, he worked with Yardbirds guitarist Jeff Beck, pianist Nicky Hopkins and future Led Zeppelin members Jimmy Page and John Paul Jones on the instrumental "Beck's Bolero", which was the B-side to "Hi Ho Silver Lining" and appeared on the album Truth. Moon also played timpani on another track, a cover of Jerome Kern's "Ol' Man River". He was credited on the album as "You Know Who".

Moon may have inspired the name for Led Zeppelin when he supposedly briefly considered leaving the Who in 1966 and spoke with Entwistle and Page about forming a supergroup; Moon (or Entwistle) remarked that a particular suggestion had gone down like a "lead zeppelin" (a play on "lead balloon"). Although this supergroup was never formed, Page remembered the phrase and later adapted it as the name of his new band.

The Beatles became friends with Moon, and this led to occasional collaborations. In 1967, he contributed backing vocals to "All You Need Is Love". On 15 December 1969, Moon joined John Lennon's Plastic Ono Band for a live performance at the Lyceum Theatre in London for a UNICEF charity concert. In 1972, the performance was released as a companion disc to Lennon and Ono's album Some Time in New York City.

Moon's friendship with Entwistle led to an appearance on Smash Your Head Against the Wall, Entwistle's first solo album and the first by a member of the Who. Moon did not play drums on the album; Jerry Shirley did, with Moon providing percussion. Rolling Stone's John Hoegel appreciated Entwistle's decision not to let Moon drum, saying that it distanced his album from the familiar sound of the Who.

Moon became involved in solo work when he moved to Los Angeles during the mid-1970s. Track Records-MCA released a Moon solo single in 1974, comprising cover versions of the Beach Boys' "Don't Worry, Baby" and "Teenage Idol". The following year he released his only solo album, entitled Two Sides of the Moon. Although it featured Moon on vocals, he played drums on only three tracks; most of the drumming was left to others (including Ringo Starr, session musicians Curly Smith and Jim Keltner, and actor-musician Miguel Ferrer). The album was received poorly by critics. New Musical Express's Roy Carr wrote, "Moonie, if you didn't have talent, I wouldn't care; but you have, which is why I'm not about to accept Two Sides of the Moon." Dave Marsh, reviewing the album in Rolling Stone, wrote: "There isn't any legitimate reason for this album's existence." During one of his few televised solo drum performances (for ABC's Wide World), Moon dressed as a cat and played a five-minute drum solo on transparent acrylic drums filled with water and goldfish. When asked by an audience member what would happen to the kit, he joked that "even the best drummers get hungry." His performance was not appreciated by animal lovers, several of whom called the station with complaints.

==== Film ====
In the 2007 documentary film Amazing Journey: The Story of The Who, Daltrey and Townshend reminisced about Moon's talent for dressing as (and embodying) a variety of characters. They remembered his dream of getting out of music and becoming a Hollywood film actor, although Daltrey did not think Moon had the patience and work ethic required of a professional actor. Who manager Bill Curbishley agreed that Moon "wasn't disciplined enough to actually turn up or commit to doing the stuff".

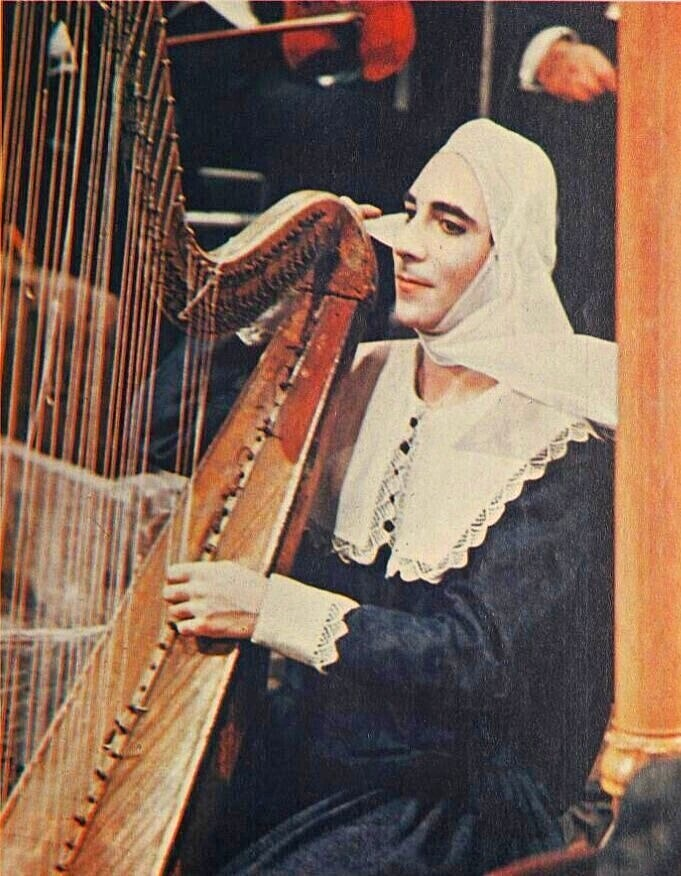
Moon acting as a nun in Zappa's 200 Motels

Nevertheless, Moon landed several acting roles. His first was in 1971, a cameo in Frank Zappa's 200 Motels as a nun afraid of dying from a drug overdose. Although it only took 13 days to film, fellow cast member Howard Kaylan remembers Moon spending off-camera time at the Kensington Garden Hotel bar instead of sleeping. Moon's next acting role was as J. D. Clover, drummer for the fictional singer Stormy Tempest (played by Billy Fury) at a holiday camp during the early days of British rock 'n' roll, in the 1973 film That'll Be the Day. He reprised the role for the film's 1974 sequel, Stardust, in Jim MacLaine's (David Essex) backing band the Stray Cats and played Uncle Ernie in Ken Russell's 1975 film adaptation of Tommy. Moon's last film appearance was in 1978's Sextette.

== Destructive behaviour ==
When you've got money and you do the kind of things I get up to, people laugh and say that you're eccentric, which is a polite way of saying you're fucking mad.

— Keith Moon

Moon led a destructive lifestyle. During the Who's early days he began taking amphetamines, and in an NME interview said his favourite food was "French Blues". He spent his share of the band's income quickly, and was a regular at London clubs such as the Speakeasy (where manager Roy Flynn recalls having to throw him out on three occasions) and The Bag O'Nails. The combination of pills and alcohol escalated into alcoholism and drug addiction. "[We] went through the same stages everybody goes through – the bloody drug corridor", he later reflected. "Drinking suited the group a lot better."

According to Townshend, Moon began destroying hotel rooms when the Who stayed at the Berlin Hilton on tour in late 1966. In addition to hotel rooms, Moon destroyed friends' homes—and even his own—including throwing furniture from upper-storey windows. Andrew Neill and Matthew Kent estimated that his destruction of hotel toilets and plumbing cost as much as £300,000. These acts, often fuelled by drugs and alcohol, were Moon's way of demonstrating his eccentricity and he enjoyed shocking the public with them. Longtime friend and personal assistant, Dougal Butler, observed: "He was trying to make people laugh and be Mr Funny; he wanted people to love him and enjoy him, but he would go so far. Like a train ride you couldn't stop."

In a limousine on the way to the airport, Moon insisted they return to their hotel, saying "I forgot something." At the hotel he ran back to his room, grabbed the television and threw it out of the window into the swimming pool below. He then jumped back into the limo, saying "I nearly forgot."

Fletcher argues that the Who's lengthy break from December 1971 to August 1972 between the end of their 1971 Who's Next Tour and the beginning of the Quadrophenia sessions devastated Moon's health, as without the rigours of lengthy shows and regular touring that had previously kept him in shape, his hard-partying lifestyle took a greater toll on his body. He did not keep a drum kit or practice at Tara (Moon's London home), and began to deteriorate physically as a result of his lifestyle. Around the same time he became a severe alcoholic, starting the day with drinks. He changed from the "lovable boozer" he presented himself as, to a "boorish drunk". David Puttnam recalled, "The drinking went from being a joke to being a problem. On That'll Be the Day it was social drinking. By the time Stardust came round it was hard drinking."

=== Exploding toilets ===
Moon's favourite stunt was to flush powerful explosives down toilets. According to Fletcher, Moon's toilet pyrotechnics began in 1965 when he purchased a case of 500 cherry bombs. Townshend remembers walking into the bathroom of Moon's hotel room and noticing the toilet had disappeared, with only the S-bend remaining. Moon explained that since a cherry bomb was about to explode, he had thrown it down the toilet and showed Townshend the case of cherry bombs. Townshend later said, "And of course from that moment on, we got thrown out of every hotel we ever stayed in."

Moon moved from cherry bombs to M-80 fireworks to sticks of dynamite, which became his explosive of choice. "All that porcelain flying through the air was quite unforgettable," Moon remembered. "I never realised dynamite was so powerful. I'd been used to penny bangers before." He quickly developed a reputation for destroying bathrooms and blowing up toilets. The destruction mesmerised him, and enhanced his public image as rock's premier hell-raiser. Tony Fletcher wrote that "no toilet in a hotel or changing room was safe" until Moon had exhausted his supply of explosives.

Entwistle recalled being close to Moon on tour and both were often involved in blowing up toilets. In a 1981 Los Angeles Times interview he admitted, "A lot of times when Keith was blowing up toilets I was standing behind him with the matches."

Once, a hotel manager called Moon in his room and asked him to lower the volume on his cassette recorder because it made "too much noise". In response, Moon asked him up to his room, excused himself to go to the bathroom, put a lit stick of dynamite in the toilet and shut the bathroom door. Upon returning, he asked the manager to stay for a moment, as he wanted to explain something. Following the explosion, Moon turned the recorder back on and said, "That, dear boy, was noise. This is the 'Oo.'"

=== Flint Holiday Inn incident ===
On 23 August 1967, on tour opening for Herman's Hermits, Moon celebrated his 21st birthday (it was initially believed that he was turning 20) at a Holiday Inn in Flint, Michigan. Entwistle later said, "He decided that if it was a publicised fact that it was his 21st birthday, he would be able to drink."

Moon began drinking immediately upon arrival in Flint. The Who spent the afternoon visiting local radio stations with Nancy Lewis (the band's publicist), and Moon posed for a photo outside the hotel in front of a "Happy Birthday Keith" sign put up by the hotel management. According to Lewis, Moon was drunk by the time the band went onstage at Atwood Stadium.

Returning to the hotel, Moon started a food fight and soon cake began flying through the air. He knocked out part of his front tooth; at the hospital, doctors could not give him an anaesthetic (due to his inebriation) before removing the remainder of the tooth. Back at the hotel, a melee erupted; fire extinguishers were set off, guests (and objects) thrown into the swimming pool and a piano reportedly destroyed. The chaos ended only when police arrived with guns drawn.

A furious Holiday Inn management presented the groups with a bill for $24,000 (equivalent to about $231,737 in 2025), which was reportedly settled by Herman's Hermits tour manager Edd McCann. Townshend claimed that the Who were banned for life from all of the hotel's properties, but Fletcher wrote that they stayed at a Holiday Inn in Rochester, New York, a week later. He also disputed a widely held belief that Moon drove a Lincoln Continental into the hotel's swimming pool, as claimed by Moon in a 1972 Rolling Stone interview.

=== Passing out on stage ===
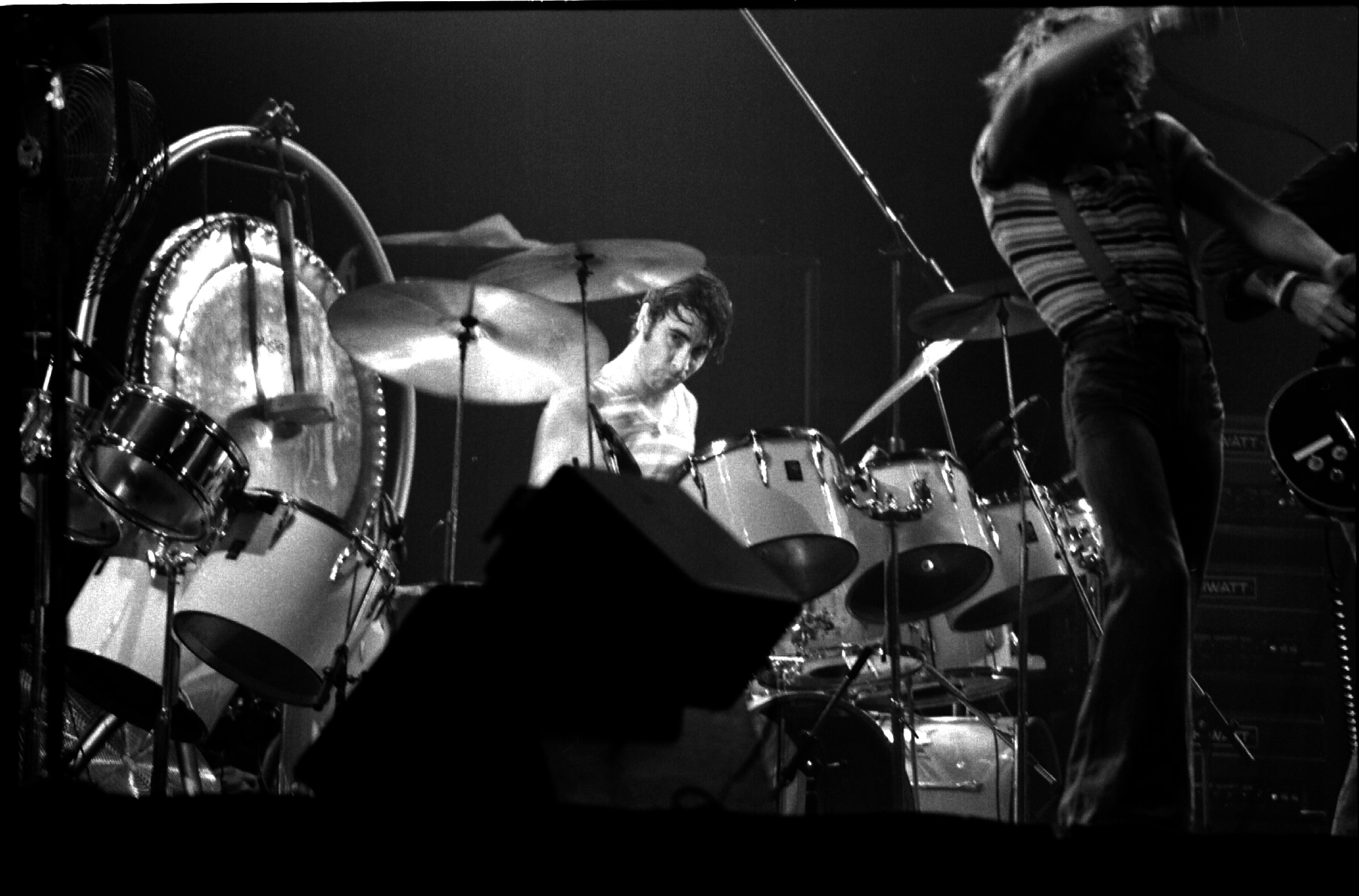
Moon at Maple Leaf Gardens, Toronto, 21 October 1976. By this point in his career, it was uncertain whether he could finish a show without incident. Except for two informal shows filmed for The Kids are Alright, this was his last public performance with the Who.

Moon's lifestyle began to undermine his health and reliability. During the 1973 Quadrophenia tour, at the Who's debut US date at the Cow Palace in Daly City, California, Moon ingested a mixture of sedatives and brandy. During the concert, Moon passed out on his drum kit during "Won't Get Fooled Again". The band stopped playing, and a group of roadies carried Moon offstage. They gave him a shower and an injection of cortisone, sending him back onstage after a thirty-minute delay. Moon passed out again during "Magic Bus", and was again removed from the stage. The band continued without him for several songs before Townshend asked, "Can anyone play the drums? – I mean somebody good?" A drummer in the audience, Scot Halpin, came up and played the rest of the show.

During the opening date of the band's March 1976 US tour at the Boston Garden, Moon passed out over his drum kit after two numbers and the show was rescheduled. The next evening, Moon systematically destroyed everything in his hotel room, cut himself doing so, and passed out. He was discovered by manager Bill Curbishley, who took him to a hospital, telling him "I'm gonna get the doctor to get you nice and fit, so you're back within two days. Because I want to break your fucking jaw ... You have fucked this band around so many times and I'm not having it any more." Doctors told Curbishley that if he had not intervened, Moon would have bled to death. Marsh suggested that at this point Daltrey and Entwistle seriously considered firing Moon, but decided that doing so would make his life worse.

Entwistle has said that Moon and the Who reached their live peak in 1975–76. At the end of the 1976 US tour in Miami that August, Moon became delirious and was treated in Hollywood Memorial Hospital for eight days. The group was concerned that he would be unable to complete the last leg of the tour, which ended at Maple Leaf Gardens in Toronto on 21 October (Moon's last public show). During the band's recording sabbatical between 1976 and 1978, Moon gained a considerable amount of weight. By the time of the Who's invitation-only show at the Gaumont State Cinema on 15 December 1977 for The Kids are Alright, Moon was visibly overweight and had difficulty sustaining a solid performance. After recording Who Are You, Townshend refused to follow the album with a tour unless Moon stopped drinking and said that if Moon's playing did not improve he would be fired. Daltrey later denied threatening to fire him, but said that by this time Moon was out of control.

=== Financial problems ===
Because the Who's early stage act relied on smashing instruments and owing to Moon's enthusiasm for damaging hotels, the group were in debt for much of the 1960s; Entwistle estimated they lost about £150,000. Even when the group became relatively financially stable after Tommy, Moon continued to rack up debts. He bought a number of cars and gadgets and flirted with bankruptcy. Moon's recklessness with money reduced his profit from the group's 1975 UK tour to £47.35 (equivalent to £368 in 2025).

== Personal life and relationships ==
=== Birthdate ===
Before the 1998 release of Tony Fletcher's Dear Boy: The Life of Keith Moon, Moon's date of birth was presumed to be 23 August 1947. This erroneous date appeared in several otherwise-reliable sources, including the Townshend-authorised biography Before I Get Old: The Story of The Who. The incorrect date had been supplied by Moon in interviews before it was corrected by Fletcher to 1946.

=== Kim Kerrigan ===
Moon's first serious relationship was with 16-year-old Kim Kerrigan, whom he started dating in January 1965 after she saw the Who play at Le Disque a Go! Go! in Bournemouth. By the end of the year she discovered she was pregnant. Her parents, who were furious, met with the Moons to discuss their options, and she moved into the Moon family home in Wembley. She and Moon were married on 17 March 1966 at Brent Register Office, and their daughter Amanda was born on 12 July. The marriage (and child) were kept secret from the press until May 1968. Moon was occasionally violent towards Kim: "if we went out after I had Mandy", she later said, "if someone talked to me, he'd lose it. We'd go home and he'd start a fight with me." He loved Amanda, but his absences due to touring and fondness for practical jokes made their relationship uneasy when she was very young. "He had no idea how to be a father", Kim said. "He was too much of a child himself."

From 1971 to 1975 Moon owned Tara, a home in Chertsey where he initially lived with his wife and daughter. The Moons entertained extravagantly at home, and owned a number of cars. Jack McCullogh, then working for Track Records (the Who's label), recalls Moon ordering him to purchase a milk float to store in the garage at Tara.

In 1973 Kim, convinced that neither she nor anyone else could moderate Keith's behaviour, left her husband and took Amanda; she sued for divorce in 1975 and later married Faces keyboard player Ian McLagan. Marsh believes that Moon never truly recovered from the loss of his family. Butler agrees; despite his relationship with Annette Walter-Lax, he believes that Kim was the only woman Moon loved. McLagan commented that Moon "couldn't handle it". Moon would harass them with phone calls, and on one occasion before Kim sued for divorce, he invited McLagan for a drink at a Richmond pub and sent several "heavies" to break into McLagan's home on Fife Road and look for Kim, forcing her to hide in a walk-in closet. She died in a car crash in Austin, Texas, on 2 August 2006.

=== Annette Walter-Lax ===
In 1975 Moon began a relationship with Swedish model Annette Walter-Lax, who later said that Moon was "so sweet when he was sober, that I was just living with him in the hope that he would kick all this craziness." She begged Malibu neighbour Larry Hagman to check Moon into a clinic to dry out (as he had attempted to do before), but when doctors recorded Moon's chemical intake at breakfast (a bottle of champagne, Courvoisier and amphetamines), they concluded that there was no hope for his rehabilitation.

=== Friends ===
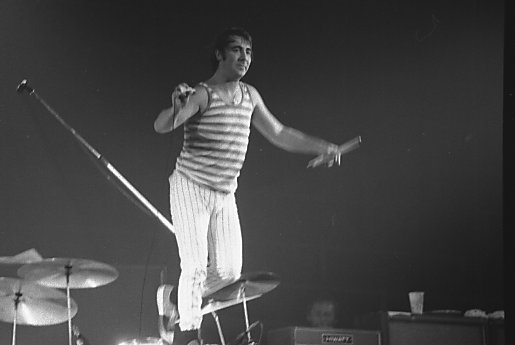
Moon onstage in Toronto, 21 October 1976

Moon enjoyed being the life of the party. Bill Curbishley remembered that "he wouldn't walk into any room and just listen. He was an attention seeker and he had to have it."

Early in the Who's career, Moon got to know the Beatles. He would join them at clubs, forming a particularly close friendship with Ringo Starr. Moon later became friends with Bonzo Dog Doo-Dah Band members Vivian Stanshall and "Legs" Larry Smith, and the trio would drink and play practical jokes together. Smith remembers one occasion where he and Moon tore apart a pair of trousers, with an accomplice later looking for one-legged trousers. In the early 1970s, Moon helped Stanshall with his "Radio Flashes" radio show for BBC Radio 1, filling in for the vacationing John Peel. Moon filled in for Peel in 1973's "A Touch of the Moon", a series of four programmes produced by John Walters.

Guitarist Joe Walsh enjoyed socialising with Moon. In an interview with Guitar World magazine, he recalled that Moon "taught me how to break things". In 1974, Moon struck up a friendship with actor Oliver Reed while working on the film version of Tommy. Although Reed matched Moon drink for drink, he appeared on set the next morning ready to perform; Moon, on the other hand, would cost several hours of filming time. Reed later said that Moon "showed me the way to insanity".

=== Dougal Butler ===
Peter "Dougal" Butler began working for the Who in 1967, becoming Moon's personal assistant the following year to help him stay out of trouble. He remembers managers Kit Lambert and Chris Stamp saying, "We trust you with Keith but if you ever want any time off, for a holiday or some sort of rest, let us know and we'll pay for it." Butler never took them up on the offer.

Butler followed Moon when Moon relocated to Los Angeles, but felt that the drug culture prevalent at the time was bad for him: "My job was to have eyes in the back of my head." Townshend agreed, saying that by 1975 Butler had "no influence over him whatsoever." Although he was a loyal companion to Moon, the lifestyle eventually became too much for him; he phoned Curbishley, saying that they needed to move back to England or one of them might die. Butler quit in 1978, and later wrote of his experiences in a book entitled Full Moon: The Amazing Rock and Roll Life of Keith Moon.

=== Neil Boland ===
On 4 January 1970, Moon accidentally killed his friend, driver and bodyguard, Neil Boland, outside the Red Lion pub in Hatfield, Hertfordshire. Pub patrons had begun to attack his Bentley; Moon, drunk, began driving to escape them and hit Boland. After an investigation, the coroner ruled Boland's death an accident; Moon, having been charged with a number of offences, received an absolute discharge.

Those close to Moon said that he was haunted by Boland's death for the rest of his life. According to Pamela Des Barres, Moon had nightmares (which woke them both) about the incident and said he had no right to be alive.

== Death ==
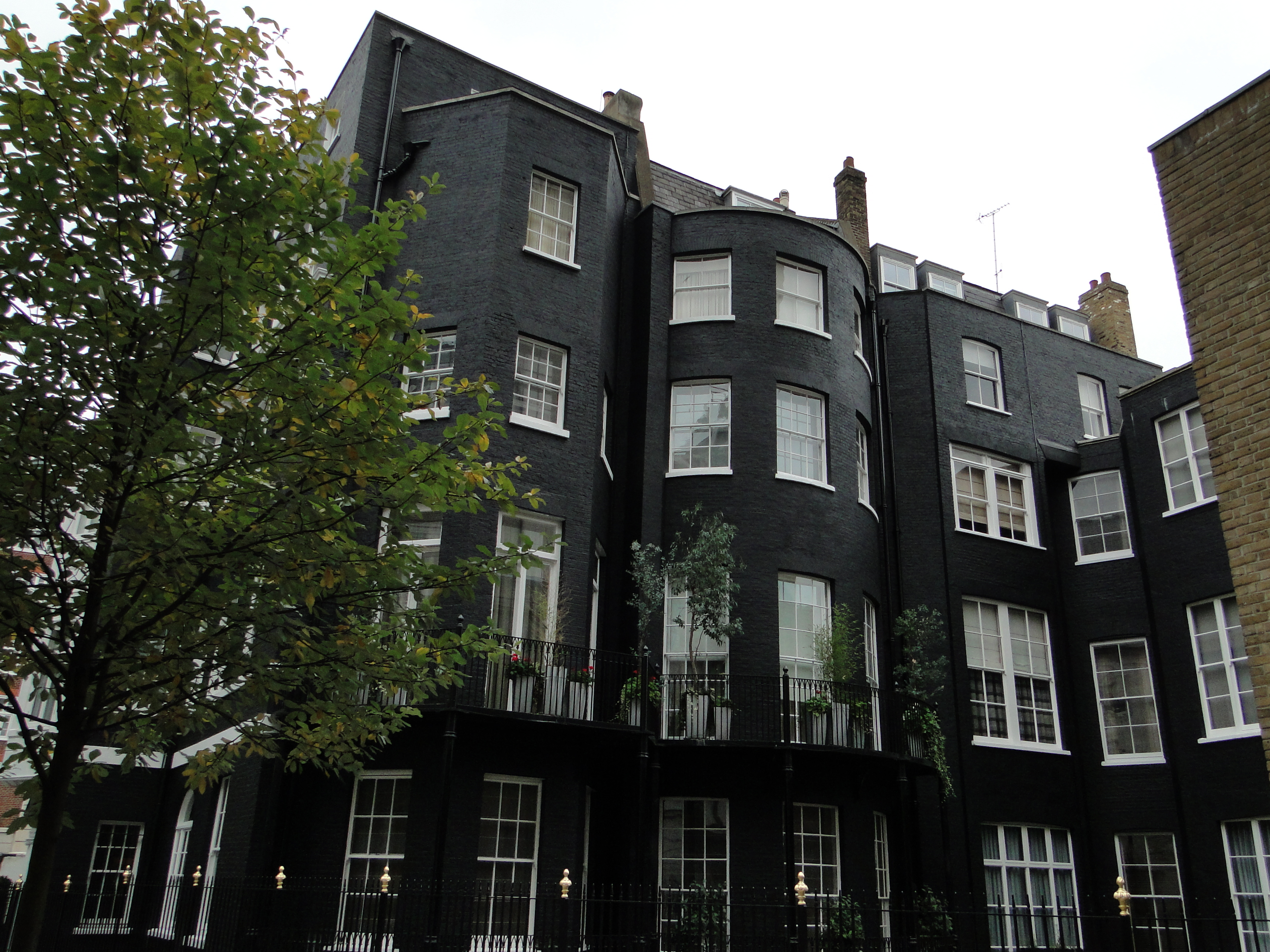
9 Curzon Square in 2012; Moon lived on the third floor (top left) in 1978.

In mid-1978, Moon moved into Flat 12, 9 Curzon Place (later Curzon Square), Mayfair, London, renting from Harry Nilsson. Singer Cass Elliot of the Mamas & the Papas had died there four years earlier, at the age of 32; Nilsson was concerned about letting the flat to Moon, believing it was cursed. Townshend disagreed, assuring him that "lightning wouldn't strike the same place twice".

After moving in, Moon began a prescribed course of Heminevrin (clomethiazole, a sedative) to alleviate his alcohol withdrawal symptoms. He wanted to get sober, but because of his fear of psychiatric hospitals, he wanted to do it at home. Clomethiazole is discouraged for unsupervised detoxification because of its addictive potential, its tendency to induce tolerance, and its risk of death when mixed with alcohol. The pills were prescribed by Geoffrey Dymond, a physician who was unaware of Moon's lifestyle. Dymond prescribed a bottle of 100 pills, instructing him to take one pill when he felt a craving for alcohol but not more than three pills per day.

By September 1978, Moon was having difficulty playing the drums, according to roadie Dave "Cy" Langston. After seeing Moon in the studio trying to overdub drums for The Kids Are Alright, he said, "After two or three hours, he got more and more sluggish, he could barely hold a drum stick."

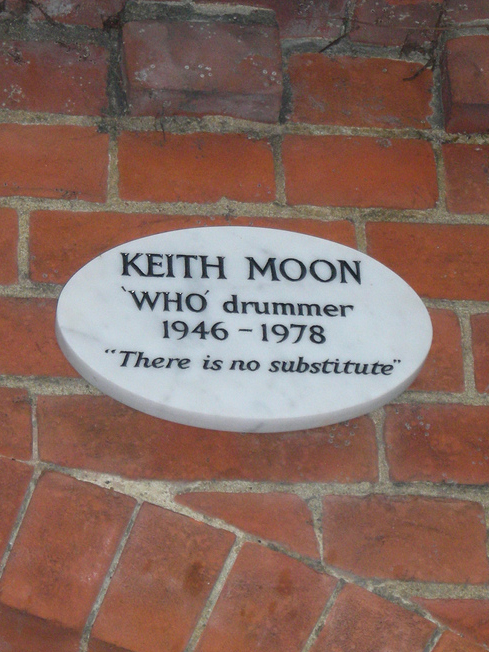
Moon's plaque at Golders Green Crematorium, London

On 6 September, Moon and Walter-Lax were guests of Paul and Linda McCartney at a preview of a film, The Buddy Holly Story. After dining with the McCartneys at Peppermint Park in Covent Garden, Moon and Walter-Lax returned to their flat. He watched a film (The Abominable Dr. Phibes), and asked Walter-Lax to cook him lamb cutlets (which Walter-Lax had stated was his favourite meal). When she objected, Moon replied, "If you don't like it, you can fuck off!" These were his last words. Moon then took some clomethiazole tablets. When Walter-Lax checked on him the following afternoon, she discovered he was dead.

Curbishley phoned the flat at around 5:00 p.m. looking for Moon, and Dymond gave him the news. Curbishley told Townshend, who informed the rest of the band. Entwistle was giving an interview to two journalists when he was interrupted by a phone call with the news of Moon's death. When asked about the band's future plans, Entwistle burst into tears and quickly ended the interview.

Moon's death came shortly after the release of their eighth studio album Who Are You. On the album cover, he is straddling a chair to hide his weight gain; the words "Not to be taken away" are on the back of the chair. Police determined that there were 32 clomethiazole pills in Moon's system. Six were digested; the other 26 were undigested when he died. Max Glatt, an authority on alcoholism, wrote in The Sunday Times that Moon should never have been given the drug. Moon was cremated on 13 September 1978 at Golders Green Crematorium in London, and his ashes were scattered in its Gardens of Remembrance.

Townshend persuaded Daltrey and Entwistle to carry on touring as the Who, although he later said that it was his means of coping with Moon's death and "completely irrational, bordering on insane". AllMusic's Bruce Eder said, "When Keith Moon died, the Who carried on and were far more competent and reliable musically, but that wasn't what sold rock records." In November 1978, Faces drummer Kenney Jones joined the Who. Townshend later said that Jones "was one of the few British drummers who could fill Keith's shoes"; Daltrey was less enthusiastic, saying that Jones "wasn't the right style". Keyboardist John "Rabbit" Bundrick, who had rehearsed with Moon earlier in the year, joined the live band as an unofficial member.

Jones left the Who in 1988, and drummer Simon Phillips (who praised Moon's ability to drum over the backing track of "Baba O'Riley") toured with the band the following year. From 1996 to 2025, the Who's drummer was Ringo Starr's son Zak Starkey who, as a child, had been given a drum kit by Moon (whom he called "Uncle Keith"). Starkey had previously toured in 1994 with Roger Daltrey, and contributed to solo studio albums by Daltrey, and John Entwistle.

The London Organising Committee of the Olympic and Paralympic Games contacted Curbishley about Moon performing at the 2012 Summer Olympics, evidently unaware he had been dead for 34 years. In an interview with The Times Curbishley quipped, "I emailed back saying Keith now resides in Golders Green Crematorium, having lived up to the Who's anthemic line 'I hope I die before I get old' ... If they have a round table, some glasses and candles, we might contact him."

== Legacy ==
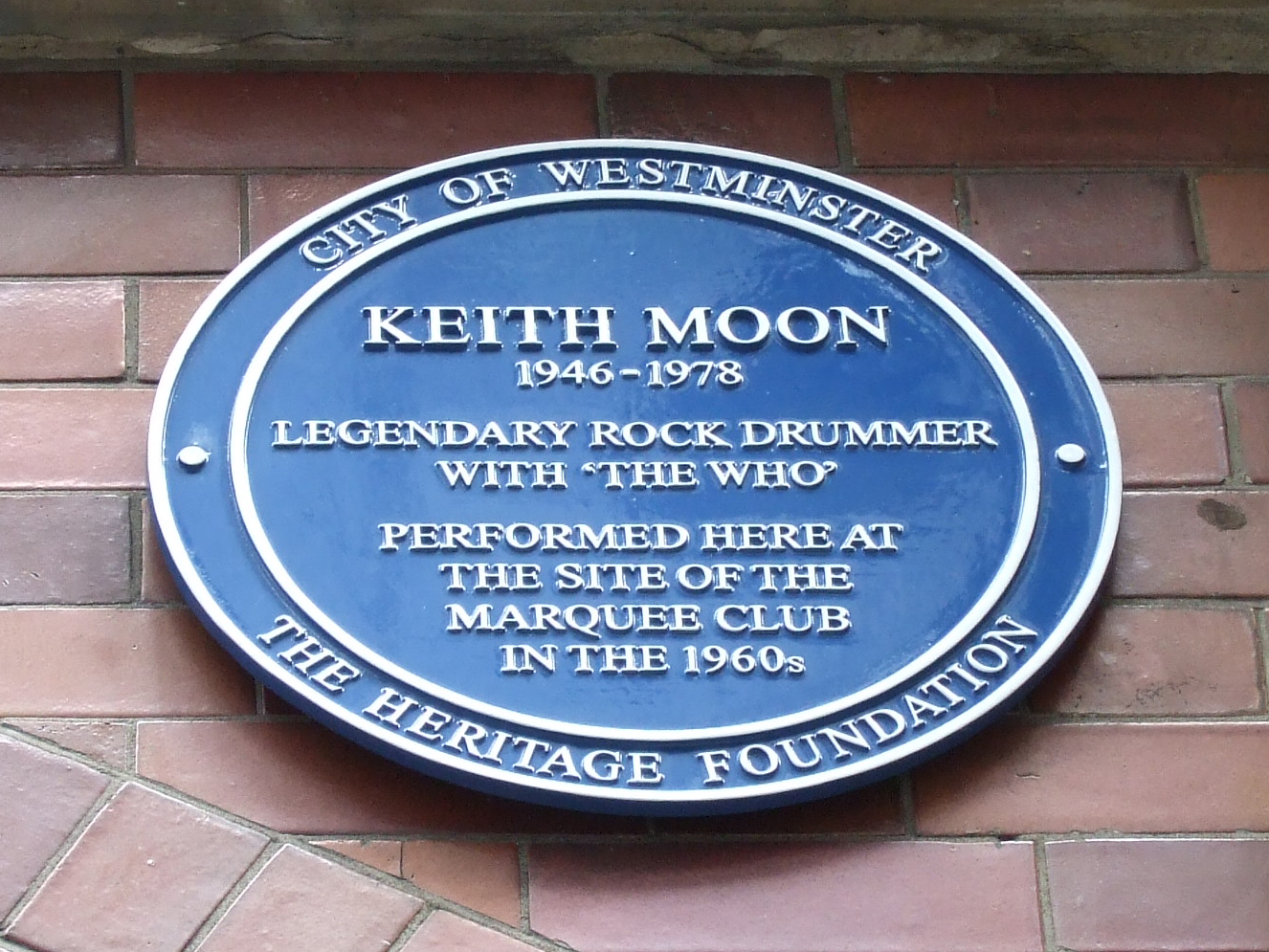
Moon's blue plaque at the site of the former Marquee Club

Moon's drumming has been praised by critics. Author Nick Talevski described him as "the greatest drummer in rock", adding that "he was to the drums what Jimi Hendrix was to the guitar." Holly George-Warren, editor and author of The Rock and Roll Hall of Fame: The First 25 Years, said: "With the death of Keith Moon in 1978, rock arguably lost its single greatest drummer." According to AllMusic critic Bruce Eder, "Moon, with his manic, lunatic side, and his life of excessive drinking, partying, and other indulgences, probably represented the youthful, zany side of rock & roll, as well as its self-destructive side, better than anyone else on the planet."

The New Book of Rock Lists ranked Moon No. 1 on its list of "50 Greatest Rock 'n' Roll Drummers", and he was ranked No. 2 on the 2011 Rolling Stone "Best Drummers of All Time" readers' poll. In 2016, the same magazine ranked him No. 2 in their list of the 100 Greatest Drummers of All Time, behind John Bonham. Adam Budofsky, editor of Drummer magazine, said that Moon's performances on Who's Next and Quadrophenia "represent a perfect balance of technique and passion" and "there's been no drummer who's touched his unique slant on rock and rhythm since."

Several rock drummers, including Neil Peart, have cited Moon as an influence. The Jam paid homage to Moon on the second single from their third album, "Down in the Tube Station at Midnight"; the B-side of the single is a Who cover ("So Sad About Us"), and the back cover of the record has a photo of Moon's face. The Jam's single was released about a month after Moon's death. Animal, one of Jim Henson's Muppet characters, may have been based on Keith Moon due to their similar hair, eyebrows, personality and drumming style. Jazz drummer Elvin Jones praised Moon's work during "Underture", as integral to the song's effect.

Ray Davies lauded Moon's drumming during his speech for the Kinks' induction into the Rock and Roll Hall of Fame, in 1990: "... Keith Moon changed the sound of drumming." After Moon's death, Ozzy Osbourne told Sounds that "people will be talking about Keith Moon 'til they die".

Clem Burke of Blondie said: "Early on all I cared about was Keith Moon and the Who. When I was about eleven or twelve, my favourite part of drum lessons was the last ten minutes, when I'd get to sit at the drumset and play along to my favourite record. I'd bring in 'My Generation'. At the end of the song, the drums go nuts. 'My Generation' was a turning point for me because before that it was all the Charlie Watts and Ringo type of thing."

In 1998 Tony Fletcher published a biography of Moon, Dear Boy: The Life of Keith Moon, in the United Kingdom. The phrase "Dear Boy" became a catchphrase of Moon's when, influenced by Kit Lambert, he began affecting a pompous English accent. In 2000, the book was released in the US as Moon (The Life and Death of a Rock Legend). Q Magazine called the book "horrific and terrific reading", and Record Collector said it was "one of rock's great biographies."

In 2008, English Heritage declined an application for Moon to be awarded a blue plaque. Speaking to The Guardian, Christopher Frayling said they "decided that bad behaviour and overdosing on various substances wasn't a sufficient qualification." The UK's Heritage Foundation disagreed with the decision, presenting a plaque which was unveiled on 9 March 2009. Daltrey, Townshend, Robin Gibb and Moon's mother Kit were present at the ceremony.

== Discography ==
=== Solo albums ===
- Two Sides of the Moon (1975)

=== Other appearances ===
- "When I'm Sixty-Four" for All This and World War II (1976)

=== With The Who ===
- My Generation (1965)
- A Quick One (1966)
- The Who Sell Out (1967)
- Magic Bus: The Who on Tour (1968)
- Tommy (1969)
- Live at Leeds (1970)
- Who's Next (1971)
- Quadrophenia (1973)
- The Who by Numbers (1975)
- Who Are You (1978)
