= Eldridge Pope =

Brewery in Dorset, UK

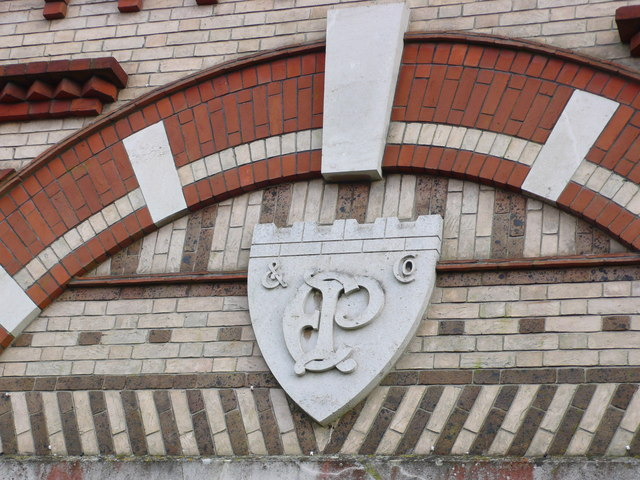
- Eldridge Pope Brewery Dorchester 2008 This is the Eldridge Pope coat of arms and the patterned brickwork above the entrance to Dorchester brewery
- Type: Brewery
- Location: Dorchester, Dorset, UK
- Opened: 1881
- Closed: 2003
- Key people: Charles Eldridge, Sarah Eldridge

Eldridge Pope & Co. was a traditional brewery situated in Dorchester, Dorset. It originated with a brewery in Durngate Street run by Charles and Sarah Eldridge from 1837; later, the Pope family of Dorset solicitors entered the business, firstly in the form of a partnership, then as a limited company, Eldridge, Pope & Co. Ltd., incorporated in 1897. A new brewery was meanwhile built closer to the railway line in 1880, and opened in 1881. The brewery closed in July 2003 following its sale to a property company, and now forms part of the Brewery Square development. The pub estate went on to be acquired by Marstons in 2007, whereupon Eldridge Pope became a dormant company. Most of the brewery was demolished in 2020, 140 years after it was built.

== History ==
The origins of Eldridge Pope can be traced back to 1837, when hotel landlord Charles Eldridge and his wife Sarah bought the Green Dragon Brewery in Durngate Street, Dorchester. Together they turned the brewery into a thriving small business, and following Charles's death in 1846, Sarah continued to run it in partnership with local brewer Samuel Mason, under the trading name 'Eldridge, Mason & Co'.

On his retirement in 1870, Mason sold his stake in the Brewery to Edwin Pope and his younger sibling Alfred Pope. Sarah Eldridge's son-in-law John Tizard inherited her share of the business, but when he died in 1871 the Popes assumed full control.

By 1879 the company had outgrown its Durngate Street premises, and the Pope brothers wanted to build a large new brewery to satisfy their expansion plans for the company. They bought up four acres of land next to the railway line, and commissioned distinguished local architect W. R. Crickmay to design the new structure.

The new brewery was officially opened in 1881, and very quickly became the biggest employer in Dorchester. Sixteen years later the Pope brothers incorporated the business as a private limited company under the name 'Eldridge, Pope & Co. Limited'.

The following decades saw the next generation of the Pope family take over the running of the company. In 1921 Clement Pope, son of Alfred, created the Huntsman trademark, which became one of the most recognizable and popular brands associated with the company.

In 1922 a huge fire ripped through the brewery, damaging much of the brewhouse and several other buildings. It was not until 1925 that the rebuilding work was completed and the brewery was able to produce beer again.

Denis Edwin Holliday was head brewer at Eldridge Pope throughout the 1960s and 70s. This era was associated with the production of popular real ales such as Royal Oak and Thomas Hardy's Ale. Holliday also had an entry in the Guinness Book of Records, 1978 edition, for brewing the strongest commercially brewed beer.

In 1997, the management of the brewery bought the business but not the site. They called their company Thomas Hardy Brewery & Packaging. In 1998, Thomas Hardy acquired another brewery in Burtonwood to form Thomas Hardy Burtonwood.

In 2003, Thomas Hardy Burtonwood offered to buy the site from Eldridge Pope for £8m but the offer was declined. Instead, Eldridge Pope sold the site to property company Landworth Properties. Landworth then raised the rent to what the brewery felt to be an uneconomic level causing it to cease its business there with the loss of 57 jobs.

One year after the brewery's closure, the family lost control of the business to pubs entrepreneur Michael Cannon who acquired the pubs for £40m plus £42m debt. He identified the need for a three-year, £14m investment programme and a focus on increasing disappointing food sales. He injected his Que Pasa bar chain into the business. The company continued to operate for a further three years under Michael Cannon's management. In January 2007, the assets of Eldridge Pope & Co. Limited were sold to Marstons plc for £155m. Michael Cannon and his fellow shareholders who included several members of the Pope family made a return of 2.8 times his original investment after turning the business around.

The site of the Eldridge Pope brewery was subsequently developed into a shopping and eating complex with restaurants, shops, apartments, a cinema, gym and a hotel.

== Culture ==
In 1985, the brewery's founder, Sarah Eldridge was the subject of Entertaining Strangers: A play for Dorchester by the playwright David Edgar and produced as a community play by the people of Dorchester, In 1987 the play was transferred to The National Theatre, with Judi Dench in the role of Sarah Eldridge.
