= Brewery Square, Dorchester =

Redevelopment project in Dorchester, Dorset

Brewery Square is a major redevelopment project on the site of the former Eldridge Pope brewery, in Dorchester, Dorset. The development is of an area 71,000 m², on a 4.6 hectares (11 acres) site. Upon its completion, the development will comprise 660 apartments and houses of mixed tenure, a 3-screen Odeon cinema, 6 restaurants, 40 shops, a Premier Inn and four star hotel and arts centre on the square and an NHS Health Centre on the main road. Phase one of the scheme, which was completed in 2012, involved the construction of a new health centre, shops and apartments. The Odeon was opened with the premiere of the James Bond film Skyfall. The completion of the main square of the site has been delayed until March 2013. There have been concerns raised that the development would increase the pressure on already-limited parking spaces in Dorchester.

The plans to convert the Brewhouse into a hotel have since been deemed impractical and so the building will become apartments with commercial premises occupying the ground floor.

The final stage would see the construction of flats and houses. This will include Hancock House, in honour of Ray Galton one of the writers of Hancock's Half Hour, who lived near Dorchester and Greenwood Gardens named the Thomas Hardy novel Under the Greenwood Tree.

== History ==
The Eldridge Pope brewery was founded by Charles and Sarah Eldridge in 1833, and the company built the Green Dragon Brewery in Dorchester in 1837. Soon afterwards, John Allen Pope joined the partnership and production moved to the Mariners Brewery, still visible in the town's High West Street. The existing Brewhouse, on which the redevelopment is taking place, was built and reopened two years after a fire in 1922 destroyed the previous site. The site was sold in 2002, and the brewery closed the following year.

External videos
- BBC video of the site
