= The Red Lion, Hatfield =

Pub in Hatfield, Hertfordshire, England

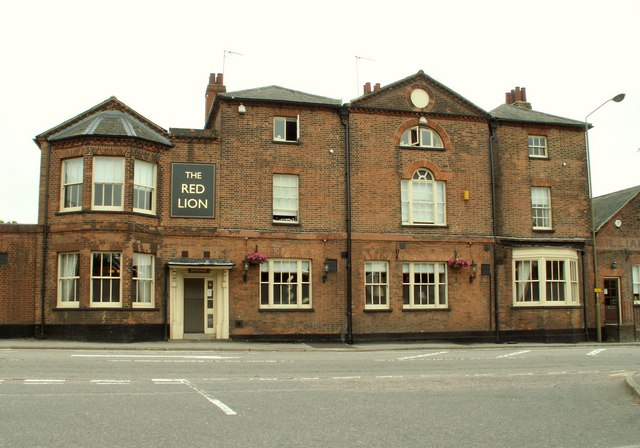
The Red Lion

The Red Lion is a grade II listed public house and former hotel on the Great North Road, Hatfield, in Hertfordshire. The building dates from the late eighteenth century with nineteenth century additions and a large 1950s rear extension.

On 4 January 1970 The Who drummer Keith Moon accidentally killed his friend, driver and bodyguard, Neil Boland, outside the pub. Patrons had begun to attack his Bentley and Moon, drunk, began driving to escape them. During the fracas, he hit Boland. After an investigation, the coroner ruled Boland's death an accident and Moon received an absolute discharge after being charged with a number of offences.
