= Thomas Hardy's Ale =

British barley wine beer

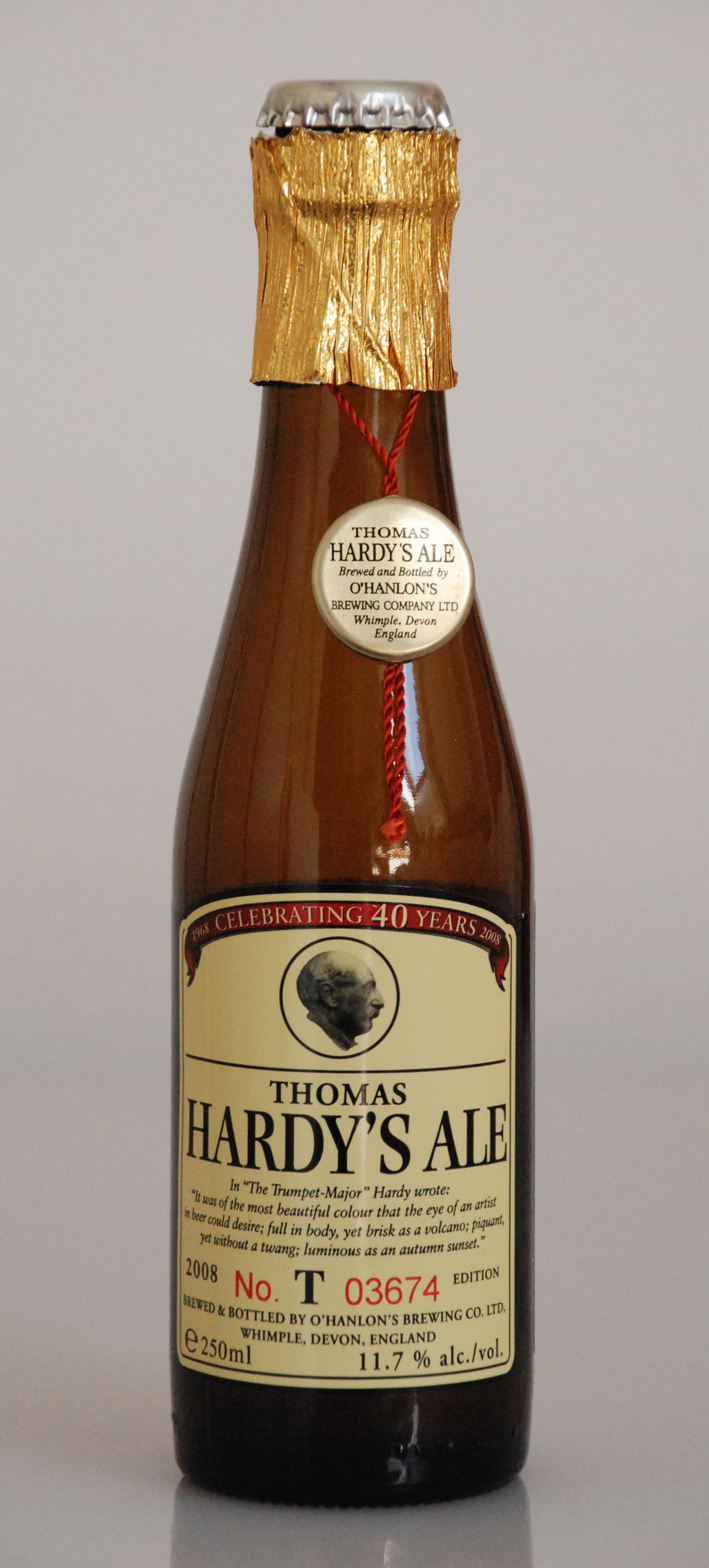
- Founded: 1968
- Headquarters: Greenwich, London, England
- Website: www.thomashardysale.com

Thomas Hardy's Ale is a barley wine named after famous English novelist and poet Thomas Hardy. The brand has gone under numerous owners over the years, and was brewed under contract at Meantime Brewery for a period.

== History ==
In 1968, Eldridge Pope Brewery created a barley wine recipe to commemorate the 40th anniversary of the death of Thomas Hardy. A pint bottle sold for an English pound, a large sum of money at the time. It was meant to be a one-off brew, but in 1974 a second vintage was created. In 1999 the brewery stopped making the beer and the following year the brewery shut its doors. In 2003 beverage exporter George Saxon bought the recipe and licensed it to be produced by O'Hanlon’s Brewery, but that arrangement ended in 2008. In 2013 Interbrau purchased the recipe and after three years began brewing the beer at Meantime Brewing.

== Products ==
Each label has the date and batch number. The original label suggested "This beer will improve if kept lying down at 55°F [13°C] and will last at least 25 years. DO NOT OPEN BEFORE JULY 1969.”

== See also ==
- Barrel-aged beer
