= The Peahen =

Pub and former inn in St. Albans, south-east England

Coordinates: 51°45′3″N 0°20′23″W

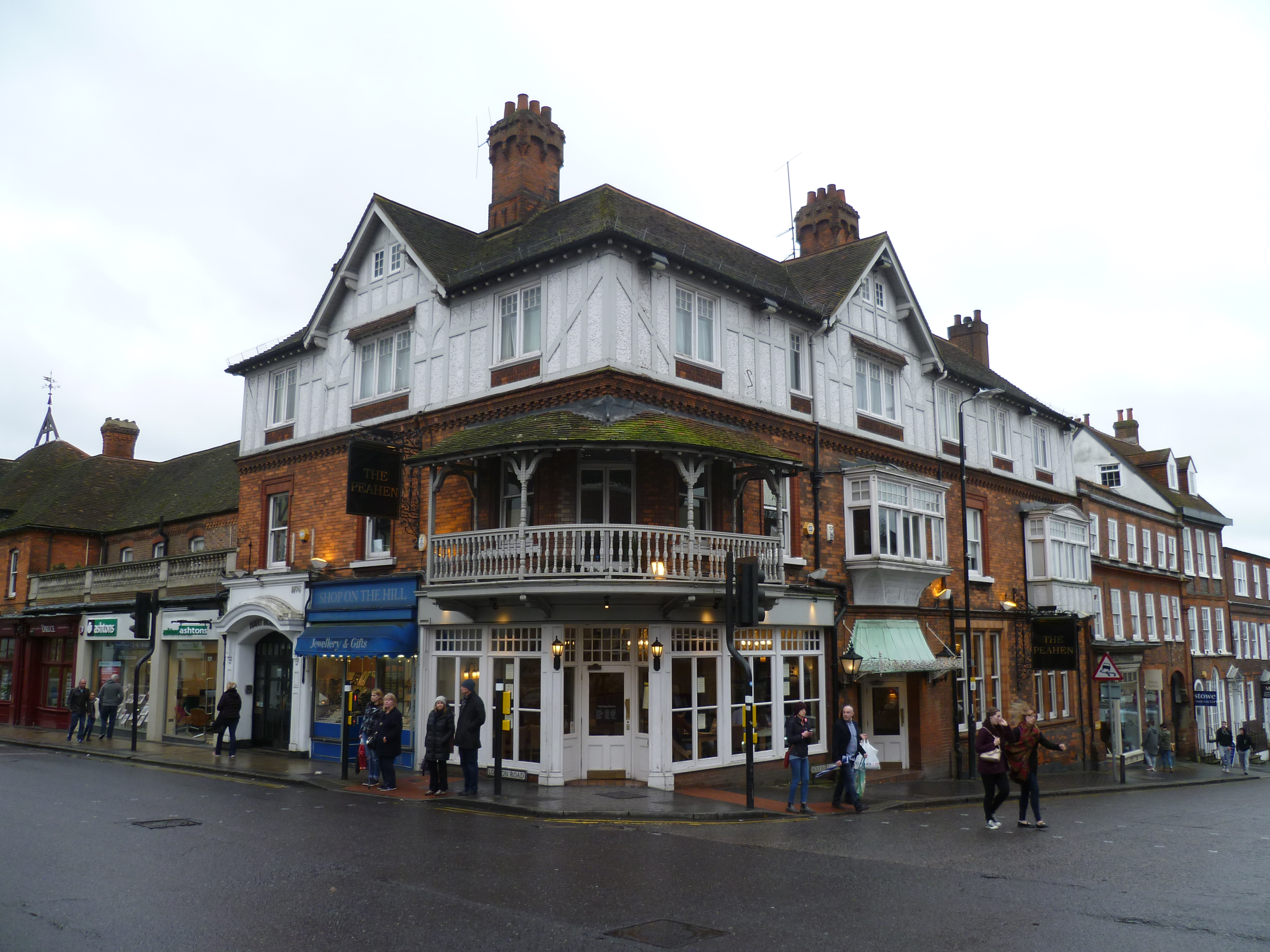
The Peahen

The Peahen is a public house in St Albans, Hertfordshire, England. The pub has been managed by McMullens Brewery since 1936.

== History ==
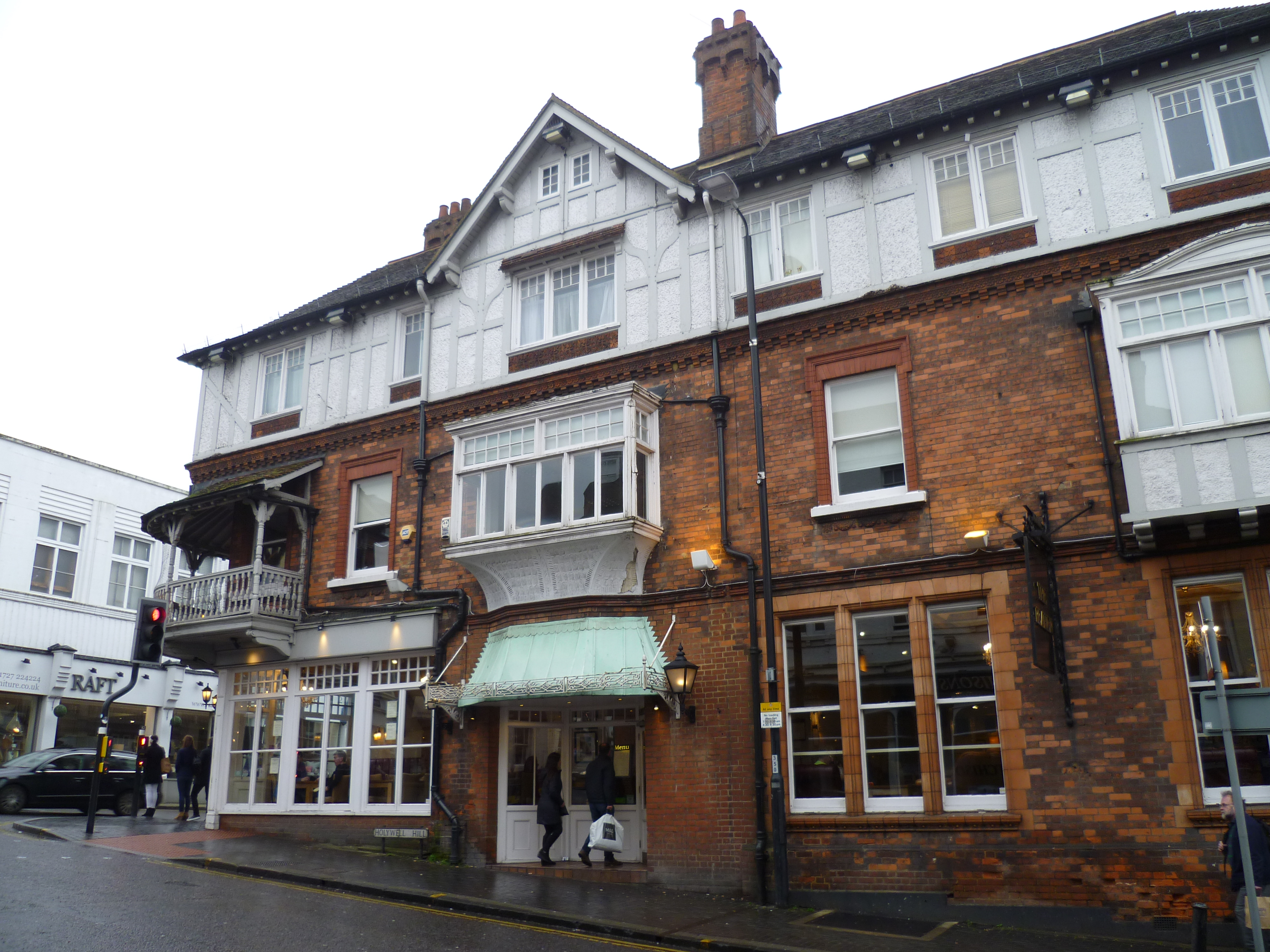
The Peahen from Holywell Hill

There has been an inn on the site since the fifteenth century. The original half-timbered building served as one of a number of coaching inns on Holywell Hill which runs into St Albans from the south.

From the late 1600s, St Albans was a major stop for coaches heading north from London through Barnet. This road followed the tortuous route via Sopwell Lane and Holywell Hill into the town centre. When the New London Road bypass was completed in 1796, the Peahen benefited now being the first inn for traffic arriving from London.

The inn was rebuilt at the end of the nineteenth century. By this time the coaching era was over, but the Peahen continued to offer stabling into the twentieth century.
