= Nag's Head, Covent Garden =

Pub in Covent Garden, London

The Nag's Head
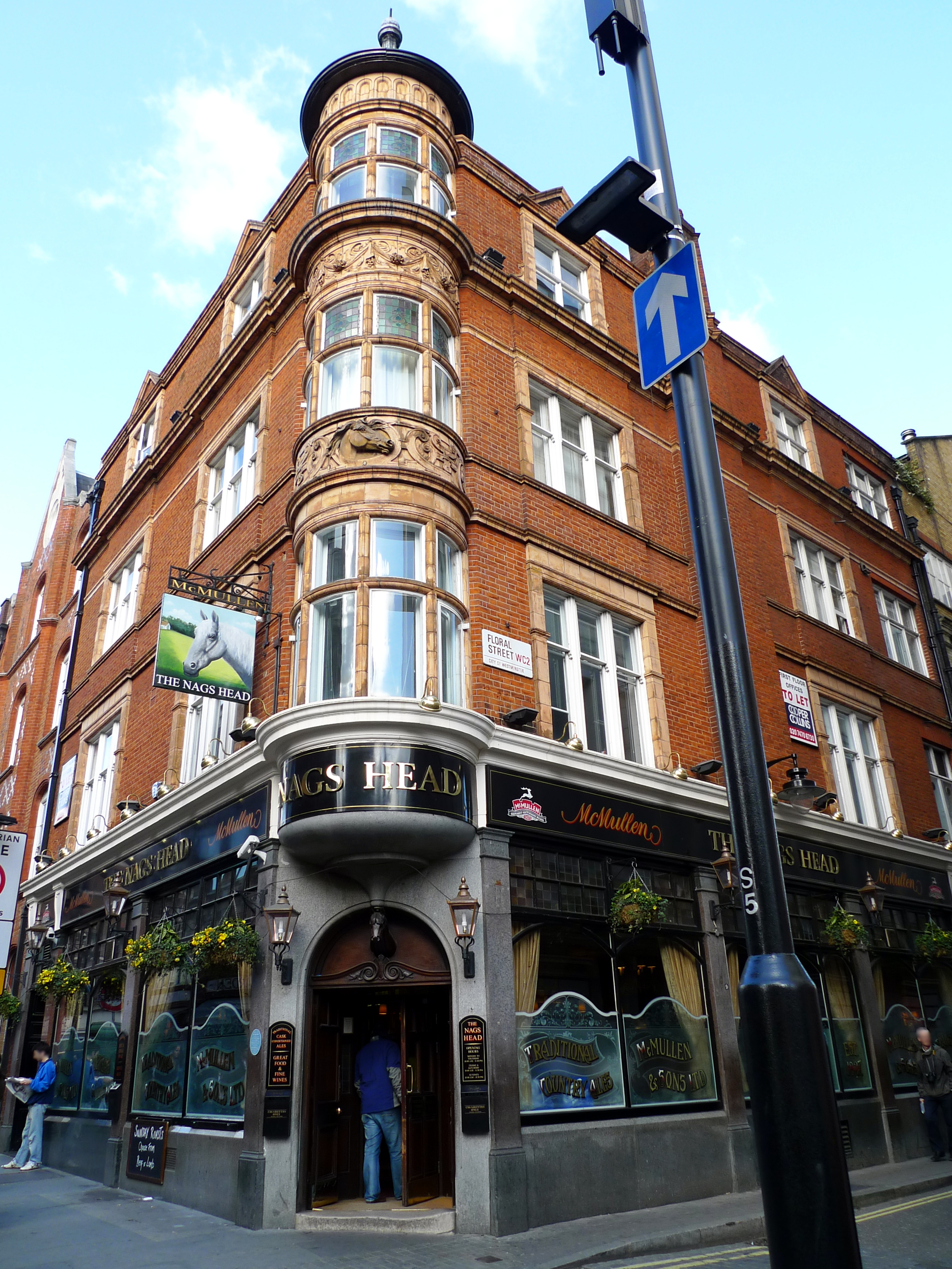
- The Nag's Head
- Type: Public house
- Location: 10 James Street, Covent Garden, London, WC2
- Coordinates: 51°30′46.64″N 0°7′25.5″W
- Built: 1900
- Architect: P. E. Pilditch

Listed Building – Grade II
- Official name: NAG'S HEAD PUBLIC HOUSE
- Designated: 01-Feb-1974
- Reference no.: 1277358

The Nag's Head is a Grade II listed public house at 10 James Street, Covent Garden, London, WC2.

== History ==
The pub was built in about 1900 and the architect was P. E. Pilditch. In late 1951 the landlords, Whitbread, converted it to a theatrical theme and it is thought to have been one of the first English themed pubs which were popular in the mid twentieth century as brewers tried to appeal to a younger generation who were not so interested in the traditional entertainments of their parents.

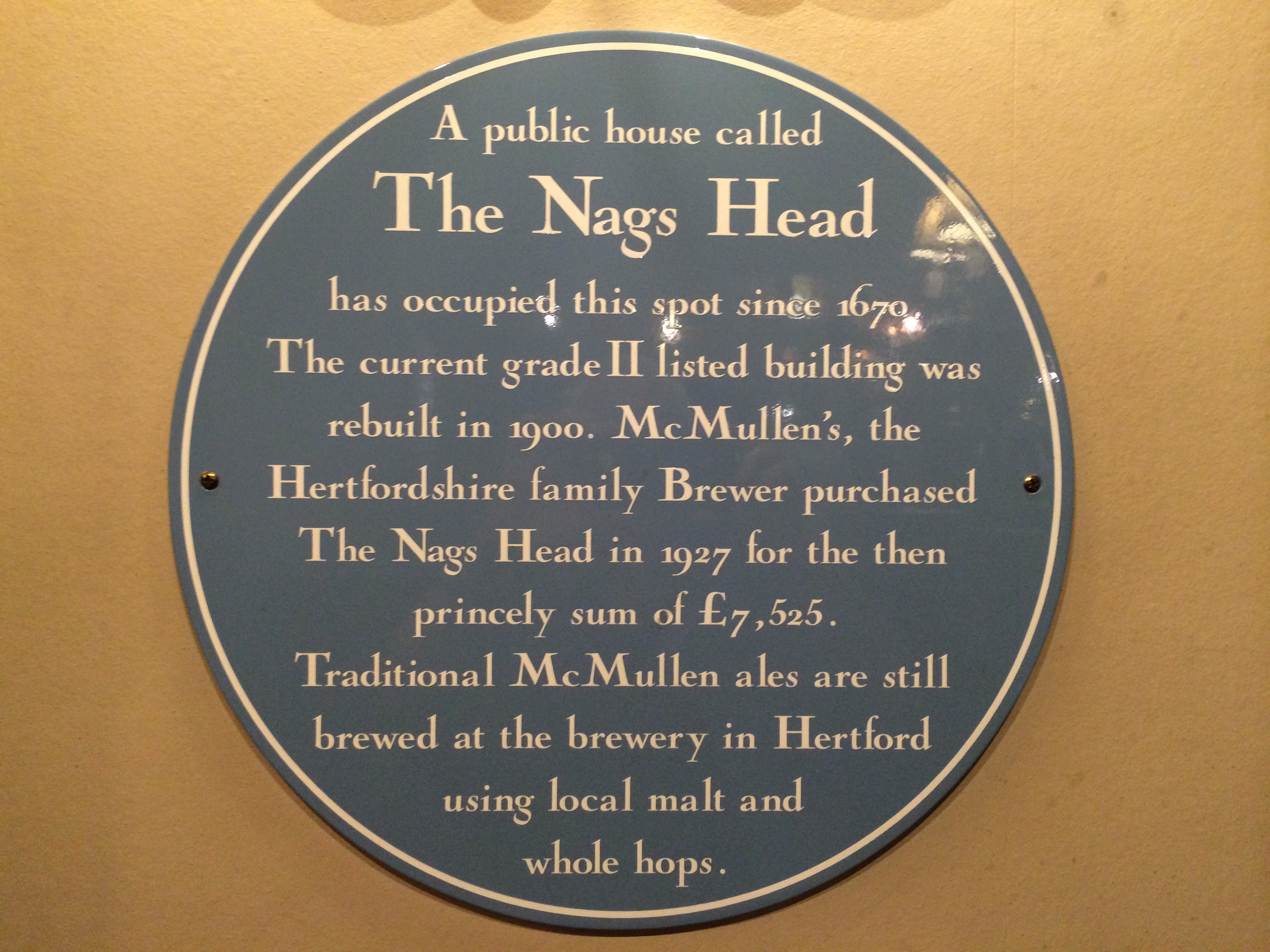
Descriptive plaque

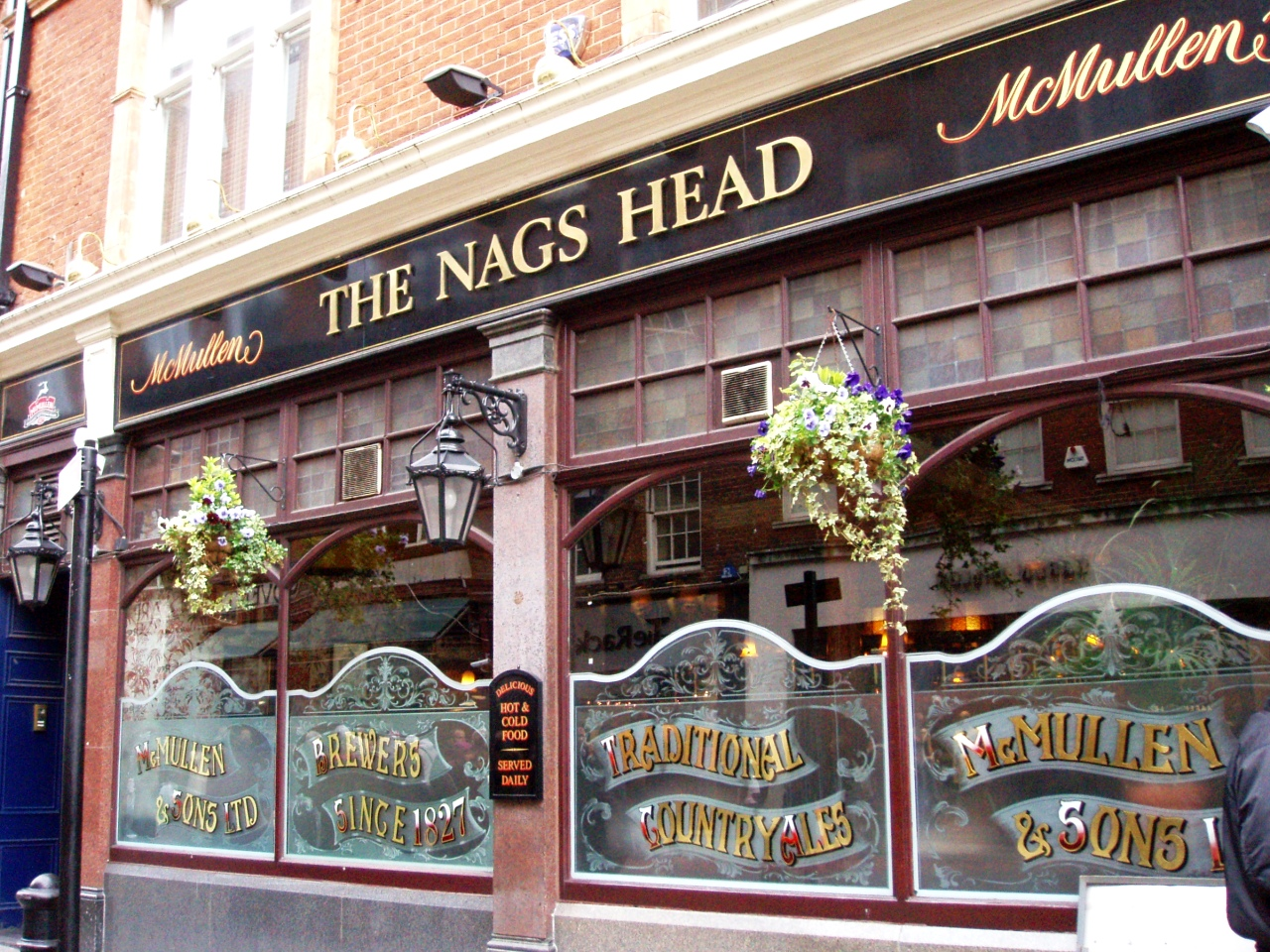
Exterior view
