= Barley wine =

Strong ale with alcohol level similar to wine

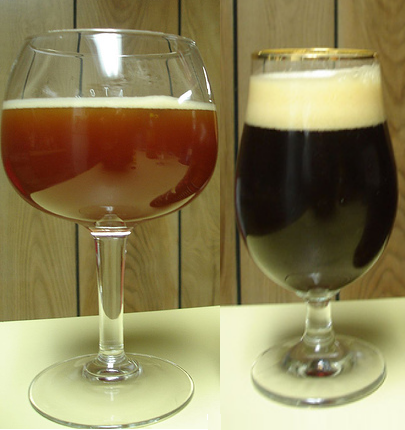
- Barley wines range in colour from translucent deep amber, to cloudy mahogany (left), to near opaque black (right).
- Country of origin: England
- Yeast type: Top-fermenting
- Alcohol by volume: 6–12%
- Color (SRM): 8–22 (English); 10–19 (American) (24–48 EBC)
- Bitterness (IBU): 35–70 (English); 50–120 (American)
- Original gravity: 1.080–1.120
- Final gravity: 1.018–1.030 (English); 1.016–1.030 (American)
- Malt percentage: 100%

Barley wine is a strong ale from 6–12% alcohol by volume.

== History ==
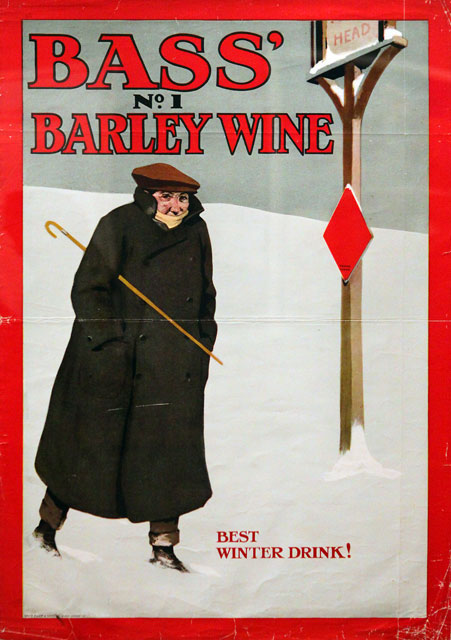
Advertisement for Bass' No.1 Barley Wine

The first beer to be marketed as barley wine was Bass No. 1 Ale, around 1870.

The Anchor Brewing Company introduced the style to the United States in 1976 with its Old Foghorn Barleywine Style Ale. Old Foghorn was styled as "barleywine" (one word) out of fear that the occurrence of the word "wine" on a beer label would displease regulators. In 1983, Sierra Nevada Brewing released Bigfoot Barleywine, becoming the second barley wine label in the United States.

== Characteristics ==
Barley wine typically reaches an alcohol strength of 6 to 12% by volume and is brewed from specific gravities as high as 1.120; equal to 320g/L of sugars. Use of the word "wine" is due to its alcoholic strength similar to a wine, but since it is made from grain rather than fruit, it is a beer. Breweries in the United States typically release it once a year during the autumn or winter.

The two primary styles of barley wine are the American, which tends to be hoppier and more bitter, with colours ranging from amber to light brown and the English style, which tends to be less bitter and may have little hop flavour, with more variety in colour ranging from red-gold to opaque black. An amber-coloured barley wine under the name Gold Label by the Sheffield brewery Tennent's was introduced in 1951.

Beer writer Michael Jackson referred to a barley wine by Smithwick's thus: "This is very distinctive, with an earthy hoppiness, a wineyness, lots of fruit and toffee flavours." He also noted that its original gravity is 1.062.

Barley wines, such as Thomas Hardy's Ale, are sometimes labelled with a production date, as they are intended to be aged, sometimes extensively.

== Taxes and legal impediments ==
Many jurisdictions have different taxing schemes for potables based upon alcohol content. Since barley wine has a high alcohol content, it is, in some jurisdictions, taxed at a higher rate than other beers.

== Wheat wine ==
A variation on the barley wine style involves adding a large quantity of wheat to the mash bill, resulting in what is referred to as "wheat wine". This style originated in the United States in the 1980s.

== See also ==
- List of barley-based beverages
- Malt liquor
