= Champion Beer of Britain =

Annual award presented by CAMRA

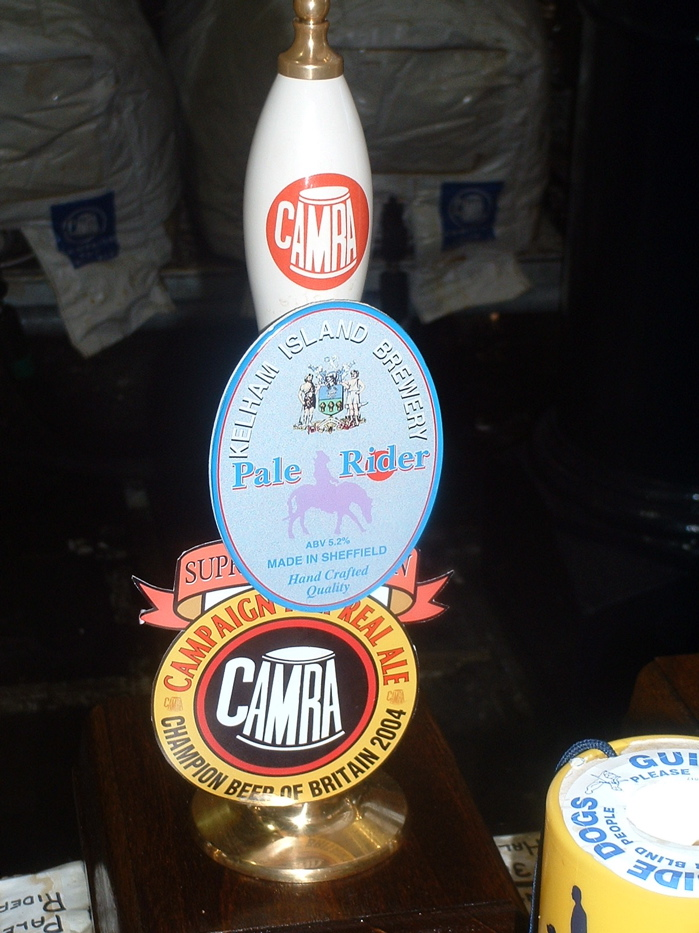
Pump clip for the Champion Beer of Britain winner in 2004, Kelham Island Pale Rider

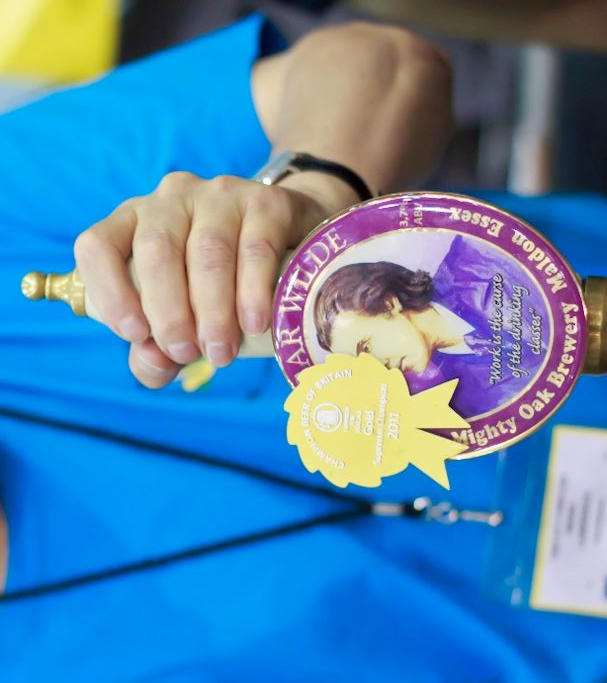
Rosette on the pump clip for Mighty Oak Oscar Wilde at the 2011 Great British Beer Festival, announcing it as the Supreme Champion for that year

The Champion Beer of Britain (also known as CBOB) is an award presented by the Campaign for Real Ale (CAMRA), at its annual Great British Beer Festival in early August.

== Qualification and judging ==
Beers can qualify for the Champion Beer of Britain in three ways:

- CAMRA tasting panels judge the beers in their geographic area of the UK. The recommendations of these panels are put forward to six regional panels, with the winners of these qualifying for the finals in August.
- Votes from CAMRA members via a form in What's Brewing, the CAMRA newsletter.
- Winning one of the 150 Beer Of The Festival awards from CAMRA beer festivals held throughout the year

Nominated beers are then grouped into categories and go through several rounds of blind tasting at the Great British Beer Festival (GBBF). Category winners are then re-judged to determine the supreme champion — the Supreme Champion Beer of Britain.

Up until 2015, the Supreme Champion was to be announced at the GBBF. In 2016, however, the announcement was made at a special Champion Beer of Britain Awards Dinner held in the evening of 9 August (the first day of that year's festival) at the Kensington Olympia Hilton Hotel on the first day of the festival. The change was made to raise the profile of the competition. After an outcry from members the process of announcing the winning beers during the trade day afternoon at GBBF was quickly reinstated.

The judges of the competition usually include professional brewers, beer writers, and respected beer enthusiasts. The focus of the judging is whether the judges actually enjoy the beer, as opposed to the American approach of judging a beer's technical merits.

While the award is prestigious, winning has sometimes caused problems for smaller breweries who have been unable to meet the demand for their champion beers caused by the newfound fame and publicity.

== Categories ==
Beers can be split into categories depending on their style or strength, from 2023 the categories were changed:

- until 2019
- Mild
- Bitter
- Best Bitter
- Golden Ales
- Strong Bitter
- Bottle-Conditioned Beers
- from 2023
- Mild
- Session Bitter
- Premium Bitter
- IPAs
- Session Pale, Blond and Golden
- Premium Pale, Blond and Golden

=== Category name changes ===
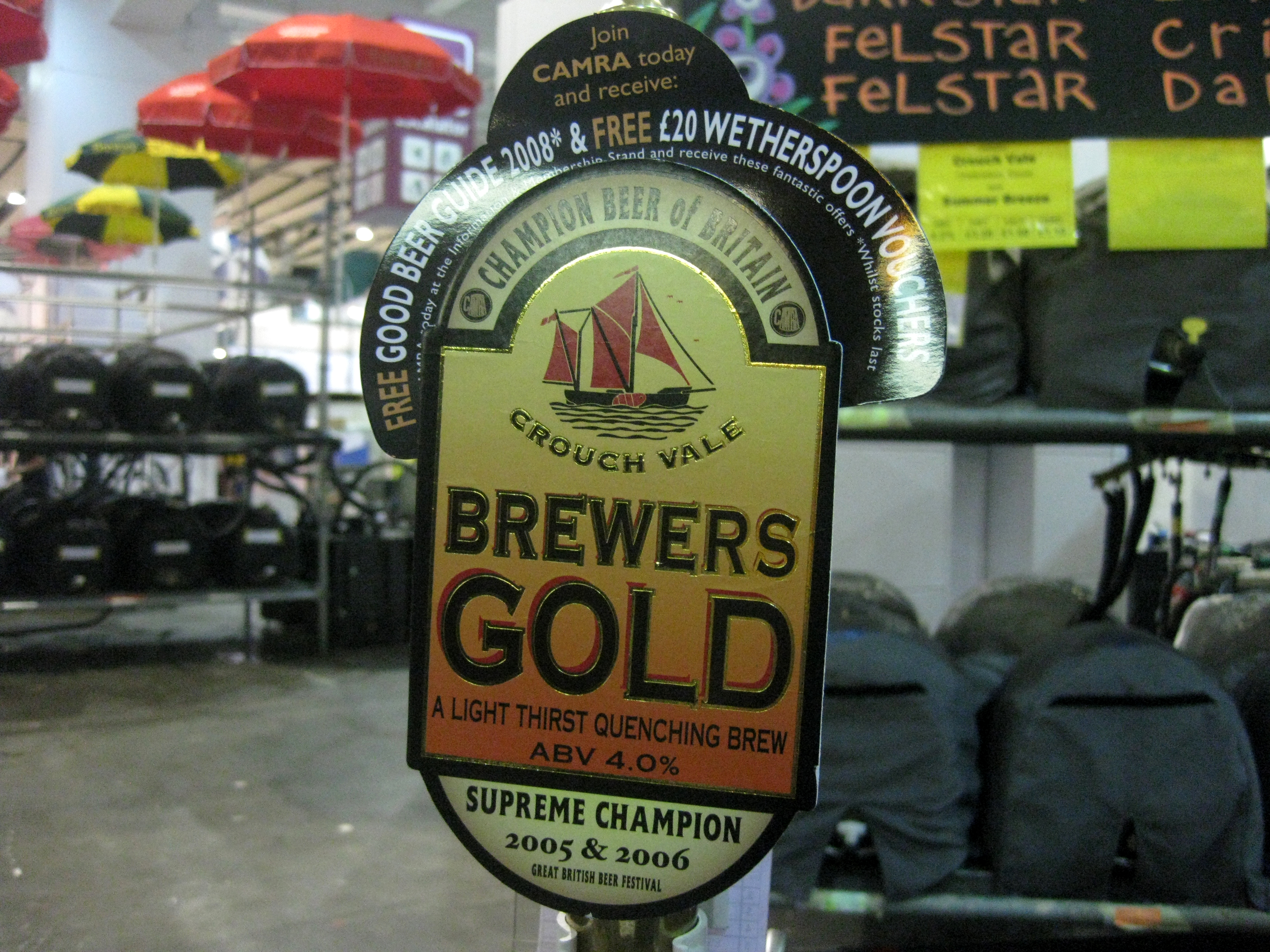
Pump clip for Crouch Vale Brewers Gold at the 2008 Great British Beer Festival, advertising it was the Supreme Champion in both 2005 and 2006.

The Old Ales & Barley Wines category has been renamed over the years. The award was first presented in 1991. In 1992 the category was split into two - Old Ales and Barley Wines. The new Old Ales category was renamed in 1993 to Old Ales & Strong Milds, changed again to Old Ales & Strong Ales in 1994, finally reverting to Old Ales & Strong Milds in 1996.

The Strong Ale category was changed in 1991 to Strong Bitter, with the Strong Milds joining the Old Ales category.

=== Winter Ales Festival ===
A winter ales festival has been held since 1991, the winner, since 1996, being named the Champion Winter Beer of Britain

Since 1996 the Old Ales & Strong Milds, Barley Wines and Porters & Stouts have been judged as part of the Champion Winter Beer Of Britain awards at the National Winter Ales Festival. In 2023 Speciality beers also moved to the Winter ales festival.

== Results ==
Key

- Blue background indicates beers that were named Supreme Champion after winning in their category.

=== Supreme Champion category ===
From 1990 onwards Gold, Silver and Bronze awards were made instead of just having an overall winner.

Year	Gold	Silver	Bronze
1978	Thwaites Best Mild (Lancashire); Fuller's, ESB (London)	n/a	n/a
1979	Fuller's, London Pride (London)	n/a	n/a
1980	Thwaites, Best Mild (Lancashire)	n/a	n/a
1981	Fuller's, ESB (London)	n/a	n/a
1982	Timothy Taylor, Landlord (West Yorkshire)	n/a	n/a
1983	Timothy Taylor, Landlord (West Yorkshire)	n/a	n/a
1984	No event was held this year		
1985	Fuller's, ESB (London)	n/a	n/a
1986	Batemans, XXXB (Lincolnshire)	n/a	n/a
1987	Pitfield, Dark Star (Greater London)	n/a	n/a
1988	Ringwood, Old Thumper (Hampshire)	n/a	n/a
1989	Fuller's, Chiswick Bitter (London)	n/a	n/a
1990	Ind Coope, Burton Ale (Staffordshire)	Timothy Taylor, Landlord (West Yorkshire)	Robinsons, Old Tom (Manchester)
1991	Mauldons, Black Adder (Suffolk)	Fuller's, ESB (London)	Brains, Dark (Cardiff)
1992	Woodforde's, Norfolk Nog (Norfolk)	Timothy Taylor, Landlord (West Yorkshire)	Batemans, Salem Porter (Lincolnshire)
1993	Adnams, Extra (Suffolk)	Timothy Taylor, Best Bitter (West Yorkshire)	Woodforde's, Headcracker (Norfolk)
1994	Timothy Taylor, Landlord (West Yorkshire)	Coach House, Blunderbuss (Cheshire)	Woodforde's, Headcracker (Norfolk)
1995	Cottage, Norman's Conquest (Somerset)	Harvey's, Porter (Sussex)	Hadrian, Centurion (Newcastle)
1996	Woodforde's, Wherry Best Bitter (Norfolk)	Cheriton, Digger's Gold (Hampshire)	Butterknowle, Banner Bitter (County Durham)
1997	Mordue, Workie Ticket (Tyne & Wear)	Batemans, Dark Mild (Lincolnshire)	Hobsons, Best Bitter (Shropshire)
1998	Coniston, Bluebird Bitter (Cumbria)	Mordue, Radgie Gadgie (Tyne & Wear)	Moorhouse's, Black Cat (Lancashire)
1999	Timothy Taylor, Landlord (West Yorkshire)	Oakham, JHB (Jeffrey Hudson Bitter) (Cambridgeshire)	Caledonian, Deuchars IPA (Edinburgh)
2000	Moorhouse's, Black Cat (Lancashire)	Hogs Back, TEA (Surrey)	York Brewery, Yorkshire Terrier (Yorkshire)
2001	Oakham, Jeffrey Hudson Bitter (Cambridgeshire)	Hop Back, Summer Lightning (Wiltshire)	Brains, Dark (Cardiff)
2002	Caledonian, Deuchars IPA (Edinburgh)	RCH, East Street Cream (Somerset)	Triple fff, Moondance (Hampshire)
2003	Harviestoun, Bitter & Twisted (Clackmannanshire)	Brains, Dark (Cardiff)	Bazens, Black Pig (Manchester)
2004	Kelham Island, Pale Rider (Sheffield)	Greene King, IPA (Suffolk)	Hampshire, Ironside (Hampshire)
2005	Crouch Vale, Brewers Gold (Essex)	Grainstore, Rutland Panther (Rutland)	Woodforde's, Wherry (Norfolk)
2006	Crouch Vale, Brewers Gold (Essex)	Harvey's, Sussex Best Bitter (Sussex)	Triple fff, Moondance (Hampshire)
2007	Hobsons, Mild (Shropshire)	Mighty Oak, Maldon Gold (Essex)	Green Jack, Ripper (Suffolk)
2008	Triple fff, Alton's Pride (Hampshire)	Beckstones, Black Dog Freddy (Cumbria)	Wickwar, Station Porter (Gloucestershire)
2009	Rudgate, Ruby Mild (North Yorkshire)	Oakham, Attila (Cambridgeshire)	West Berkshire, Dr Hexter's Healer (Berkshire)
2010	Castle Rock, Harvest Pale (Nottinghamshire)	Timothy Taylor, Landlord (West Yorkshire)	Surrey Hills, Hammer Mild (Surrey)
2011	Mighty Oak, Oscar Wilde (Essex)	Marble, Chocolate (Manchester)	Salopian, Shropshire Gold (Shropshire)
2012	Coniston, No.9 Barley Wine (Cumbria)	Green Jack, Trawlerboys Best Bitter (Suffolk)	Dark Star, American Pale Ale (Sussex)
2013	Elland, 1872 Porter (West Yorkshire)	Buntingford, Twitchell (Hertfordshire)	Fyne Ales, Jarl (Argyll & Bute)
2014	Timothy Taylor, Boltmaker (West Yorkshire)	Oakham, Citra (Cambridgeshire)	Salopian, Darwin's Origin (Shropshire)
2015	Tiny Rebel, Cwtch (Newport)	Kelburn, Jaguar (East Renfrewshire)	Dancing Duck, Dark Drake (Derby)
2016	Binghams, Vanilla Stout (Berkshire)	Old Dairy, Snow Top (Kent)	Tring, Death or Glory (Hertfordshire)
2017	Church End, Goats Milk (Warwickshire)	Bishop Nick, Ridley's Rite (Essex)	Tiny Rebel, Cwtch (Newport)
2018	Siren Craft, Broken Dream Breakfast Stout (Berkshire)	Green Jack, Ripper (Suffolk)	Mordue, Workie Ticket (Tyne & Wear)
2019	Surrey Hills, Shere Drop (Surrey)	Grey Trees, Afghan Pale (Rhondda Cynon Taf)	Oakham, Citra (Cambridgeshire)
2020	Competition cancelled due to COVID-19 pandemic		
2021	Competition cancelled due to COVID-19 pandemic		
2022	Competition cancelled due to COVID-19 pandemic		
2023	Elland, 1872 Porter (West Yorkshire)	Greene King, Abbot Ale (Suffolk)	Salopian, Darwin's Origin (Shropshire)
2024	Crouch Vale, Amarillo	Anspach & Hobday, The IPA	Green Jack, Trawlerboys Best Bitter
2025	Penzance, Mild	Sarah Hughes Brewery, Snowflake	Church End, Fallen Angel
Source: Champion Beer of Britain Results

=== Mild category ===
Year	Gold	Silver	Bronze
1978	Thwaites, Best Mild (Lancashire)	n/a	n/a
1979	Hanson's, Mild	Thwaites, Mild (Lancashire)	n/a
1980	Thwaites, Best Mild (Lancashire)	Courage, Heavy	Banks's, Mild
1981	Banks's Mild	Tetley's Mild	Thwaites Best Mild (Lancashire)
1982	Tetley's Mild	Thwaites Mild (Lancashire)	West Riding Mild
1983	Ansells, Mild	Banks's, Mild	Highgate, Mild
1984	No event was held this year		
1985	Ansells Mild	Hook Norton Mild	Adnams Mild
1986	Thwaites Best Mild (Lancashire)	Highgate Mild	Hook Norton Mild
1987	Ansells Mild	Thwaites Best Mild (Lancashire)	Timothy Taylor Golden Best (West Yorkshire)
1988	Batemans Mild	M&B Highgate Mild	Timothy Taylor Best (West Yorkshire)
1989	Timothy Taylor Golden Best	Courage Bitter Ale	Batemans Mild
1990	Harvey's Pale Ale	Batemans Mild	Timothy Taylor Golden Best (West Yorkshire)
1991	Brains Dark	Gales XXXD (Horndean)	Guernsey LBA
1992	Timothy Taylor Golden Best (West Yorkshire)	King & Barnes Sussex Mild	Brains Dark
1993	Woodforde's Mardlers Mild	Adnams Mild	n/a
1994	Hoskins & Oldfield Mild	Coachhouse Gunpowder Strong Mild	Highgate Dark
1995	Ridley Mild	Hoskins & Oldfield Mild	Cains Mild (Liverpool)
1996	Tomlinsons Heritage Mild	Batemans Dark Mild	Harvey's Sussex XX Mild
1997	Batemans Dark Mild	Cains Dark Mild (Liverpool)	Coach House Gunpowder Strong Mild
1998	Moorhouse's Black Cat Mild	Elgood's Black Dog Mild (Cambridgeshire)	Harvey's Sussex XX Mild
1999	Batemans Dark Mild	Elgood's Black Dog Mild (Cambridgeshire)	Cains Dark Mild (Liverpool); St Austell XXXX (Cornwall)
2000	Moorhouse's, Black Cat (Lancashire)	Batemans Dark	Brains Dark
2001	Brains Dark	Moorhouse's Black Cat	Boat Brewery Man in a Boat
2002	Triple fff Pressed Rat & Warthog (Hampshire)	Boat Brewery Man in a Boat	Moorhouse's Black Cat
2003	Lidstones Rowley Mild	Brains Dark	Bazens Black Pig Mild
2004	Lees GB Mild (Manchester)	Brains Dark	Hardys & Hansons Kimberley Mild
2005	Grainstore Rutland Panther	Brains Dark	Elgood's Black Dog (Cambridgeshire)
2006	Mighty Oak, Oscar Wilde (Essex)	Elgood's Black Dog (Cambridgeshire)	Grainstore Rutland Panther
2007	Hobsons, Mild (Shropshire)	Nottingham Rock Mild	Brain's Dark
2008	Beckstones, Black Dog Freddy (Cumbria)	Rudgate, Ruby Mild (York)	Rhymney, Dark (Merthyr Tydfil)
2009	Rudgate, Ruby Mild (North Yorkshire)	Bank Top, Dark Mild (Lancashire)	Highland, Dark Munro (Orkney)
2010	Surrey Hills Hammer Mild	Greene King XX Mild (Suffolk)	Golcar Dark Mild; Nottingham Rock Ale Mild
2011	Mighty Oak, Oscar Wilde (Essex)	Rudgate, Ruby Mild	Coastal, Merry Maidens
2012	Rudgate, Ruby Mild (North Yorkshire)	Hobsons, Hobsons Mild (Shropshire)	Son of Sid, Muckcart Mild (Bedfordshire)
2013	Great Orme, Welsh Black (Conwy)	Cotswold Spring, Old Sodbury Mild (Gloucestershire)	Fernandes, Malt Shovel Mild (West Yorkshire)
2014	Bank Top, Dark Mild	Branscombe Vale, Mild	Castle Rock, Black Gold
2015	Williams Bros, Black	Rudgate, Ruby Mild	Great Orme, Welsh Black
2016	Williams Bros, Black	Mighty Oak, Oscar Wilde (Essex)	Acorn, Darkness
2017	Rudgate, Ruby Mild (North Yorkshire)	West Berkshire, Maggs' Magnificent Mild	Winter's, Mild (Norfolk)
2018	Greene King, XX Mild (Suffolk)	Rhymney, Dark (Gwent)	East London Brewery, Orchid (Greater London)
2019	Church End, Grave Digger's Ale (Warwickshire)	Fernandes, Malt Shovel Mild (West Yorkshire)	West Berkshire, Maggs' Mild (Berkshire)
2020	Competition cancelled due to COVID-19 pandemic		
2023	Harvey's, Dark Mild (East Sussex)	Bank Top, Dark Mild (Greater Manchester)	Church End, Grave Digger's Ale (Warwickshire)
2024	Penzance Brewing Co, Mild	Brains, Dark	Five Kingdoms Brewery, McGregor’s Mild
2025	Penzance, Mild	n/a	n/a
Source: Champion Beer of Britain Results

=== Session Bitter category ===
Year	Gold	Silver	Bronze
1978	Ridleys Bitter	n/a	n/a
1979	Fuller's London Pride (London)	Wadworth 6X	Sam Smiths Old Brewery Bitter
1980	Exmoor Ale	Archers Bitter	Young's Bitter
1981	West Riding Tyke	Shepherd Neame	n/a
1982	Clarke's Wakefield	West Riding Bitter	Tetley's Bitter
1983	Burton Bridge Bitter	Shepherd Neame Bitter	Young's Bitter
1984	No event was held this year		
1985	Gales BBB (Horndean)	Brakspear Bitter	Burton Bridge Bitter
1986	Brakspear PA	Young's Bitter	Gales BBB (Horndean)
1987	King & Barnes Sussex	Thwaites Bitter (Lancashire)	Young's Bitter
1988	Tetley's Bitter	King & Barnes Sussex	Hook Norton Bitter
1989	Fuller's, Chiswick Bitter (London)	Butcombe Bitter	Golden Hill Exmoor Ale
1990	Adnams Bitter	Young's Bitter	Butcombe Bitter
1991	Cain's Traditional Bitter	Stones Best Bitter	Young's Bitter
1992	Ridley's IPA	Butterknowle Bitter	Plassey Bitter
1993	Timothy Taylor Best Bitter (West Yorkshire)	Caledonian R&D Deuchars IPA	n/a
1994	Everards Beacon	Caledonian R&D Deuchars IPA	Judge's Barrister Best
1995	Cheriton Pots Ale	Everards Beacon	Oakham JHB (Cambridgeshire)
1996	Woodforde's, Wherry (Norfolk)	Caledonian R&D Deauchers IPA	Butcombe Bitter; Big Lamp Bitter
1997	Hobsons Best Bitter	Ruddles Best Bitter	Goddards Special; Hydes Bitter (Bronze)
1998	Coniston, Bluebird Bitter (Cumbria)	Oakham JHB (Cambridgeshire)	Dent Aviator; Itchen Valley Godfathers
1999	Oakham JHB (Cambridgeshire)	Caledonian Deuchars IPA	Goddards special Woodforde's Wherry
2000	Bullmastiff Gold & Brakspear Bitter	n/a	Oakham JHB (Cambridgeshire); Harviestoun Bitter and Twisted (Clackmannanshire)
2001	Oakham, JHB (Cambridgeshire)	Adnams Bitter	Harviestoun Bitter and Twisted (Clackmannanshire); Barge and Barrel Bargee
2002	Caledonian, Deuchars IPA (Edinburgh)	Rudgate Viking	RCH Hewish IPA; Oakham JHB (Cambridgeshire)
2003	Harviestoun, Bitter & Twisted (Clackmannanshire)	Daleside Bitter (Yorkshire)	Triple fff Alton Pride (Hampshire); Caledonian Deuchars IPA
2004	Greene King IPA (Suffolk)	Oakham JHB (Cambridgeshire)	Triple fff Alton Pride (Hampshire); Whim Hartington Bitter
2005	Woodforde's Wherry Best Bitter	Holdens Black Copuntry Bitter	RCH PG Steam; Belvoir Star
2006	Elgood's Cambridge Bitter (Cambridgeshire)	Acorn Brewery Barnsley Bitter	Sharp's Doom Bar; Woodforde Wherry
2007	Castle Rock Harvest Pale	Twickenham Crane Sundancer	Surrey Hills Ranmore Ale; Fyne Piper's Gold
2008	Triple fff, Alton's Pride (Hampshire)	Lees, Bitter (Manchester)	Jarrow, Rivet Catcher (Tyne & Wear); Surrey Hills, Ranmore Ale (Surrey)
2009	Surrey Hills, Ranmore Ale (Surrey)	Butcombe, Bitter (Avon)	Humpty Dumpty, Little Sharpie (Norfolk); Triple fff, Alton's Pride (Hampshire)
2010	RCH PG Steam	Moor Revival	Orkney Raven; Purple Moose Snowdonia Ale
2011	Salopian, Shropshire Gold	Teignworthy, Reel Ale	Triple fff, Altons Pride (Hampshire); Potton, Shannon IPA
2012	Purple Moose, Snowdonia Ale (Gwynedd)	Tintagel, Castle Gold (Cornwall)	Flowerpots, Bitter (Hampshire); Fuller's, Gales Seafarers Ale (London); Salopian, Shropshire Gold (Shropshire)
2013	Buntingford, Twitchell (Hertfordshire)	Moor, Revival (Somerset)	Surrey Hills, Ranmore Ale (Surrey); Buttcombe Bitter (Somerset)
2014	Timothy Taylor, Boltmaker (West Yorkshire)	Mighty Oak, Captain Bob	Flowerpots, Flowerpots Bitter; Sambrook's Wandle Ale (London)
2015	Pheasantry, Best Bitter	Acorn, Barnsley Bitter	Purple Moose, Madog's Ale; Timothy Taylor, Boltmaker (West Yorkshire)
2016	Timothy Taylor, Boltmaker	Tiny Rebel (Newport), Hank	Hawkshead, Bitter; Salopian, Shropshire Gold
2017	Church End, Goats Milk (Warwickshire)	Bishop Nick, Ridley's Rite (Essex)	Triple fff, Alton's Pride (Hampshire)
2018	Orkney, Red MacGregor (Northern Isles)	Mighty Oak, Captain Bob (Essex)	Bank Top, Flat Cap (Greater Manchester); Acorn, Barnsley Bitter (South Yorkshire)
2019	Dancing Duck, Ay Up (Derbyshire)	Rhymney, Hobby Horse (Gwent)	Wolf, Edith Cavell (Norfolk); Ulverston, Laughing Gravy (Cumbria)
2020	Competition cancelled due to COVID-19 pandemic		
2023	Salopian Brewery, Darwin's Origin	Timothy Taylor, Landlord	The Mighty Oak Brewing Company, Captain Bob
2024	Logan Beck Brewing, Proper Bitter	Mighty Oak Brewing Co, Captain Bob	Windsor & Eton Brewery, Guardsman
2025	Butcombe, Butcombe Original	n/a	n/a
Source: Champion Beer of Britain Results

=== Premium (Best) Bitter category ===
Year	Gold	Silver	Bronze
1988	Timothy Taylor Landlord (West Yorkshire)	Wadworth 6X	Fuller's London Pride (London)
1989	Timothy Taylor Landlord (West Yorkshire)	Batham Bitter	Marston's Pedigree (Burton upon Trent)
1990	Timothy Taylor Landlord (West Yorkshire)	Fuller's London Pride (London)	Wadworth 6X
1991	Batham Best Bitter	Marston's Pedigree Bitter (Burton upon Trent)	Timothy Taylor Landlord (West Yorkshire)
1992	Timothy Taylor Landlord (West Yorkshire)	Butterknowle Concilliation Ale	Exe Valley Dob's Bitter
1993	Adnams, Extra (Suffolk)	Timothy Taylor Landlord (West Yorkshire)	n/a
1994	Timothy Taylor Landlord (West Yorkshire)	Fuller's London Pride (London)	Concertina Band Club KW Special Pride
1995	Fuller's London Pride (London)	Hogs Back TEA (Surrey); Otter Ale	n/a
1996	Butterknowle Banner Bitter	Camerons Strongarm	Brains SA; Plassey Bitter
1997	Mordue, Workie Ticket (Tyne & Wear)	Cottage Golden Ale	Whitbread Castle Eden; Concertina Bengal Tiger
1998	RCH Pitchfork	Adnams Extra	Timothy Taylor Landlord (West Yorkshire); Fuller's London Pride (London)
1999	Timothy Taylor, Landlord (West Yorkshire)	Harvey's Armada Ale	Jennings Cocker Hoop; Tomos Watkin OSB
2000	Hogs Back TEA (Surrey)	York Yorkshire Terrier Bitter	Timothy Taylor Landlord (West Yorkshire); Houston St Peter's Well
2001	RCH Pitchfork	Woodforde's Nelson's Revenge	Goddards Special; Hog's Back TEA
2002	Triple fff Moondance (Hampshire)	Crouch Vale Brewers Gold	Orkney Red McGregor; Fuller's London Pride (London)
2003	Crouch Vale Brewers Gold	West Berkshire Full Circle	Slaters Supreme; Roosters Hooligan
2004	Hampshire Ironside	Hook Norton Generation	Nottingham Extra Pale Ale; Woodfordes Nelson's Revenge
2005	Harvey's Sussex Best Bitter	Mighty Oak Burntwood Bitter	Timothy Taylor Landlord (West Yorkshire); Olde Swan Entire
2006	Harvey's Sussex Best Bitter	Triple fff Moon Dance (Hampshire)	Kelburn Red Smiddy; Surrey Hills Shere Drop
2007	Purple Moose Glaslyn Ale	George Wright Pipe Dream	Fuller's London Pride (London); Nethergate Suffolk County; Station House Buzzin'
2008	Skinner's, Betty Stogs (Cornwall)	Highland, Scapa Special (Orkney)	Cairngorm, Nessies Monster Mash (Highlands); Timothy Taylor, Landlord (West Yorkshire)
2009	Southport, Golden Sands (Merseyside)	Buntingford, Britannia (Hertfordshire)	Evan Evans, Cwrw (Carmarthenshire); Thornbridge, Lord Marples (Derbyshire); Vale, VPA (Buckinghamshire)
2010	Timothy Taylor Landlord (West Yorkshire)	St Austell Tribute (Cornwall)	Evan Evans Cwrw; Great Oakley Gobble
2011	Houston, Peter's Well	Country life, Golden Pig	Castle Rock, Preservation; Bollington, Best Bitter
2012	Green Jack, Trawlerboys Best Bitter (Suffolk)	Salopian, Hop Twister (Shropshire)	Oakwell, Senior Bitter (South Yorkshire); Milton, Pegasus (Cambridgeshire)
2013	Mordue, Workie Ticket (North Shields)	Surrey Hills, Shere Drop (Surrey)	Purple Moose, Glaslyn (Gwynedd); Woodforde's, Nelsons Revenge (Norfolk)
2014	Salopian, Darwin's Origin	Red Willow, Directionless	Purity, Mad Goose; Langton, Inclined Plain Bitter
2015	Tiny Rebel, Cwtch (Newport)	Highland, Scapa Special	Barngates, Tag Lag; Salopian, Darwin's Origin
2016	Surrey Hills, Shere Drop	Salopian, Darwin's Origin	Colchester, Colchester No.1; Tiny Rebel, Cwtch (Newport)
2017	Tiny Rebel, Cwtch (Newport)	Blackedge, Pike (Greater Manchester)	Surrey Hills, Shere Drop (Surrey); West Berkshire, Good Old Boy
2018	Mordue, Workie Ticket (Tyne & Wear)	Bishop Nick, 1555 (Essex)	St Austell, Tribute (Cornwall); Salopian, Darwin's Origin (Shropshire)
2019	Surrey Hills, Shere Drop (Surrey)	Green Jack, Trawler Boys (Suffolk)	Castle Rock, Preservation (Nottingham); Salopian, Darwin's Origin (Shropshire)
2020	Competition cancelled due to COVID-19 pandemic		
2023	Greene King, Abbot Ale	Glamorgan Brewing, Jemima's Pitchfork	Batemans, XXXB
2024	Green Jack Brewery, Trawlerboys Best Bitter	Sharp’s Brewery, Sea Fury	Cairngorm Brewery, Wildcat
2025	Cairngorm, Wildcat	n/a	n/a
Source: Champion Beer of Britain Results

=== IPAs category ===
Year	Gold	Silver	Bronze
2023	Bragdy Twt Lol, Diablo Dragons	Loch Lomond Brewery, Bravehop	Thornbridge Brewery, Jaipur
2024	Anspach & Hobday, The IPA	Byatt’s Brewery, Mahana IPA	Bragdy Twt Lol, Dreigiau’r Diafol [Diablo Dragons]
2025	Elusive, Oregon Trail	n/a	n/a

=== Session Pale, Blond and Golden Ales category ===
Year	Gold	Silver	Bronze
2023	Swannay Brewery, Island Hopping	Oakham Ales, Inferno	Salopian Brewery, Oracle
2024	Loch Lomond Brewery, Southern Summit	Oakham Ales, Citra	Bewdley Brewery, Sunshine
2025	Track, Sonoma	n/a	n/a

=== Premium Pale, Blond and Golden Ales category ===
Year	Gold	Silver	Bronze
2023	Baker's Dozen Brewing Co., Electric Landlady	Blackedge Brewing Co., Kiwi	St Austell Brewery, Proper Job
2024	Crouch Vale Brewery, Amarillo	St Austell Brewery, Proper Job	Swannay Brewery, Orkney IPA
2025	Church End, Fallen Angel	n/a	n/a

=== Bottle-conditioned Beers category ===
Year	Gold	Silver	Bronze
1991	Bass Worthington's White Shield	Guinness Original Stout	Eldridge Pope Thomas Hardy Ale
1992	Gales Prize Old Ale (Horndean)	Eldridge Pope Thomas Hardy Ale	Bass Worthington's White Shield
1993	Eldridge Pope's Thomas Hardy Ale	Courage Imperial Russian Stout	n/a
1994	Courage Imperial Russian Stout	King & Barnes Festive	Shepherd Neame Spitfire
1995	King & Barnes Festive	Gales Prize Old Ale (Horndean)	Bass Worthington's White Shield
1996	Marston's Oyster Stout (Burton upon Trent)	Worthington's White Shield	Courage Russian Imperial Stout
1997	Hop Back Summer Lightning (Wiltshire)	King & Barnes Festive	Fuller's 1845 (London)
1998	Fuller's 1845 (London)	Burton Bridge Empire Pale Ale	Hampshire Brewery Pride of Romsey
1999	Young's Special London Ale	Salopian Entire Butt	Hampshire Pride of Romsey
2000	King & Barnes Worthington's White Shield	Hampshire Pride of Romsey	King & Barnes Festival
2001	RCH Ale Mary	Hop Back Summer Lightning (Wiltshire)	Fuller's 1845 (London)
2002	Fuller's 1845 (London)	Brakspear Live Organic	Hop Back Summer Lightning (Wiltshire)
2003	O'Hanlons Original Port Stout	Fuller's 1845 (London)	RCH Old Slug Porter
2004	Titanic Stout	Young's Special London Ale	Yates' Isle of Wight Special
2005	Durham Evensong	Young's Special London Ale	Titanic Stout
2006	Worthington's White Shield Silver	Greene King Hen's Tooth (Suffolk)	Titanic Stout (Staffordshire)
2007	O'Hanlon's Port Stout	Titanic Stout; Wye Valley Dorothy Goodbody's Wholesome Stout	Wapping Baltic Gold
2008	Wye Valley, Dorothy Goodbody's Wholesome Stout	Fuller's, 1845 (London)	Wells and Young's, Special London Ale (Bedfordshire)
2009	Titanic, Stout (Staffordshire)	Great Gable, Yewbarrow (Cumbria)	White Shield Brewery, White Shield (Burton-on-Trent)
2010	St Austell, Admiral's Ale (Cornwall)	Pitfield, 1850 London Porter (Essex)	Great Oakley, Delapre Dark (Northamptonshire)
2011	St Austell, Proper Job (Cornwall)	Molson Coors, Worthington's White Shield; Brown Cow, Captain Oates Dark Oat Mild	n/a
2012	Stewart, Embra (Midlothian)	Great Gable, Yewbarrow (Cumbria)	Molson Coors, Worthington's White Shield (Staffordshire)
2013	Molson Coors, Worthington's White Shield (Staffordshire)	St Austell, Proper Job (Cornwall)	Harvey's, Imperial Extra Double Stout (East Sussex)
2014	Marble, Chocolate Marble (Manchester)	St Austell, Proper Job (Cornwall)	Spire, Prince Igor Imperial Russian Stout (Derbyshire)
2015	Harvey's, Imperial Extra Double Stout (Lewes, East Sussex)	Fyne Ales, Superior India Pale Ale (Achadunan, Cairndow)	Mordue, India Pale Ale (North Shields, Tyne & Wear)
2016	Stringers, Mutiny (Cumbria)	Flipside, Russian Rouble (Nottinghamshire)	Crouch Vale, Yakima Gold (Essex)
2017	St Austell, BIG Job (Cornwall)	Fuller's, Vintage Ale 2017 (London)	Oakham, Green Devil IPA (Peterborough)
2018	Fuller's, 1845 (London)	Durham, Temptation Imperial (County Durham)	St Austell, BIG Job (Cornwall)
2019	Thornbridge, Saint Petersburg Imperial Russian Stout (Derbyshire)	St Austell, Proper Job (Cornwall)	St Austell, BIG Job (Cornwall)
2020	Hogs Back, A Over T (Surrey)	Durham, Temptation Imperial (County Durham)	Harvey's, Imperial Extra Double Stout (East Sussex)
2021	Competition cancelled due to COVID-19 pandemic		
2022	Harvey's Brewery, Imperial Double Extra Stout	Hobsons Brewery, Dhustone Stout	Runaway Brewery, Runaway IPA
2023	Green Jack Brewing, Baltic Trader	Hobsons Brewery, Dhustone Stout	Five Kingdoms Brewery, McGregor's Mild
2024	Five Kingdom’s Dark Storm Stout	Lacons' Audit	Incredible Brewing Co Milk Stout
2025	St Austell, Proper Job	Monty's, Mischief	Kernel, Imperial Brown Stout
Source: Champion Bottled Beer of Britain Results

=== Defunct award categories ===
==== Strong Ale category (1979–1991) ====
Year	Gold	Silver	Bronze
1978	Fuller's, ESB (London)	n/a	n/a
1979	Fuller's, ESB (London)	Theakston Old Peculier	Greene King Abbot Ale (Suffolk)
1980	Young's Special	Gales HSB (Horndean)	Fuller's ESB (London)
1981	Fuller's, ESB (London)	Gales HSB (Horndean)	Theakston Old Peculier
1982	Marston's Owd Roger	Lees Moonraker (Manchester)	Theakston Old Peculier
1983	Fuller's ESB (London)	Gales HSB; Theakston Old Peculier	n/a
1984	No event was held this year		
1985	Fuller's, ESB (London)	Gales HSB (Horndean); Theakston Old Peculier	n/a
1986	Theakston Old Peculier	Ringwood Old Thumper	Marstons Owd Rodger
1987	Fuller's ESB (London)	Theakston Old Peculier	Robinsons Old Tom
1988	Ringwood Old Thumper	Fuller's ESB (London)	Gibbs Mew Bishop's Tipple
1989	Theakston Old Peculier	Batemans Victory Ale	Fuller's ESB (London)
1990	Robinsons Old Tom	Ringwood Old Thumper	Fuller's ESB (London)
1991	Category closed		
Source: Champion Beer of Britain Results

==== New Brewery category (1985–1991) ====
Year	Gold	Silver	Bronze
1985	Old Mill	Mauldons	Ringwood
1986	Pitfield, Dark Star (Greater London)	Old Mill Bullion	Banks & Taylor SOS
1987	Pitfield, Dark Star (Greater London)	Old Mill Bullion	Banks & Taylor SOS
1988	Banks & Taylor SOS	Sarah Hughes Dark Ruby	Woodforde's Wherry
1989	Hop Back Summer Lightning (Wiltshire)	Whitby's Own Force Nine	Sarah Hughes Dark Ruby Mild
1990	Woodforde's Wherry Best Bitter	West Coast Sierra Nevada Pale Ale	Yates' Premium
1991	Category closed		
Source: Champion Beer of Britain Results

==== Premium Bitter category (1982–1991) ====
Year	Gold	Silver	Bronze
1982	Timothy Taylor Landlord (West Yorkshire)	Marston's Pedigree (Burton upon Trent)	West Riding Tyke Bitter
1983	Timothy Taylor Landlord (West Yorkshire)	Young's Special	Marston's Pedigree (Burton upon Trent)
1984	No event was held this year		
1985	Young's Special	Marston's Pedigree (Burton upon Trent)	Timothy Taylor Landlord (West Yorkshire)
1986	Batemans, XXXB (Lincolnshire)	Fuller's London Pride (London)	Timothy Taylor (West Yorkshire)
1987	Category closed		
Source: Champion Beer of Britain Results

==== Special Bitter category (1987–1991) ====
Year	Gold	Silver	Bronze
1987	Batemans, XXXB (Lincolnshire)	Timothy Taylor, Landlord (West Yorkshire)	Young's, Special (London)
1988	Batemans, XXXB (Lincolnshire)	Young's, Special (London)	Holdens, HSB (West Midlands)
1989	Batemans, XXXB (Lincolnshire)	Moorhouse's, Pendle Witches Brew (Lancashire)	Young's, Special (London)
1990	Ind Coope, Burton Ale (Staffordshire)	Greene King, Abbot Ale (Suffolk)	Adnams, Broadside (Suffolk)
1991	Category closed		
Source: Champion Beer of Britain Results

==== Golden Ale category (2005–2019) ====
Year	Gold	Silver	Bronze
2005	Crouch Vale Brewers Gold (Essex)	Jarrow Rivet Catcher	Oakham JHB (Cambridgeshire)
2006	Crouch Vale Brewers Gold (Essex)	Hop Back Summer Lightning (Wiltshire)	Holdens Golden Glow
2007	Mighty Oak Maldon Gold	Oakleaf Hole Hearted	Otley O1
2008	Otley, O1 (Mid Glamorgan)	Loddon, Ferryman's Gold (Oxfordshire)	Skinner's, Cornish Knocker Ale (Cornwall)
2009	Dark Star, American Pale Ale (West Sussex)	Adnams, Explorer (Suffolk)	St Austell, Proper Job (Cornwall)
2010	Castle Rock, Harvest Pale (Nottinghamshire)	Marble Manchester Bitter	St Austell Proper Job (Cornwall)
2011	Cumbrian Legendary Ales, Loweswater Gold	Salamander, Golden Salamander	Holdens, Golden Glow
2012	Dark Star, American Pale Ale (Horsham, West Sussex)	Cumbrian Legendary Ales, Langdale (Hawkshead, Cumbria)	Hobsons, Town Crier (Cleobury Mortimer, Shropshire)
2013	Beeston, On the huh (Norfolk)	Marble, Dobber (Greater Manchester)	Castle Rock Brewery, Screech Owl (Nottingham)
2014	Oakham Ales, Citra (Cambridgeshire)	Hawkshead, Cumbrian Five Hop	Salopian Brewery, Hop Twister
2015	Kelburn, Jaguar	Adnams, Explorer	Blue Monkey, Infinity
2016	Golden Triangle, Mosaic City	Grey Trees Independent Craft Brewery, Diggers Gold	Marble, Lagonda IPA
2017	Blue Monkey, Infinity (Nottinghamshire)	Fyne Ales, Jarl (Argyll and Bute)	Ludlow, Gold (Shropshire)
2018	Salopian Brewery, Oracle (Shropshire)	Salopian Brewery, Hop Twister (Shropshire)	Abbeydale, Moonshine (South Yorkshire); Windsor & Eton, Knight of the Garter (Berkshire)
2019	Oakham Ales, Citra (Cambridgeshire)	Five Points, Pale (Greater London)	Vocation, Heart & Soul (West Yorkshire); Big Lamp, Prince Bishop Ale (Tyne & Wear)
2020	Category closed		
Source: Champion Beer of Britain Results

==== Strong Bitter category (1991–2019) ====
Successor to the Strong Ale category. Strong Milds were transferred to the Old Ales category.

Year	Gold	Silver	Bronze
1991	Fuller's ESB (London)	Hop Back Summer Lightning (Wiltshire)	Hardys & Hansons Kimberley Classic
1992	Hop Back Summer Lightning (Wiltshire)	Harvey's Armada Ale	Randall's Best Bitter
1993	Exe Valley Exeter Old Bitter	Mauldons White Adder	n/a
1994	Coach House Posthorn	Moorhouse's Pendle Witches Brew	n/a
1995	Hadrian Centurion	Fuller's ESB (London)	Hop Back Summer Lightning (Wiltshire)
1996	Cheriton Diggers Gold	Bullmastiff Son of a Bitch	Hop Back Summer Lightning (Wiltshire)
1997	Batemans XXXB	Dent Kamikaze	Hop Back Summer Lightning (Wiltshire)
1998	Mordue Radgie Gadgie	Dent Kamikaze	Cheriton Diggers Gold
1999	Ballard Nyewood Gold	Durham White Bishop	Hop Back Summer Lightning (Wiltshire)
2000	Cropton Monkman's Slaughter	Gales HSB (Horndean)	Hop Back Summer Lightning (Wiltshire)
2001	Hop Back Summer Lightning (Wiltshire)	Goachers Gold Star Ale	Slater's Supreme
2002	RCH East Street Cream	Fuller's ESB (London)	Hogs Back Hop Garden Gold (Surrey)
2003	Adnams, Broadside	RCH, East Street Cream	Oakham, Bishops Farewell (Cambridgeshire)
2004	Kelham Island, Pale Rider (Sheffield)	Mordue IPA	Hop Back Summer Lightning (Wiltshire)
2005	Hanby Nutcracker	Bullmastiff Son of a Bitch	Fuller's ESB (London)
2006	York Centurion's Ghost	Thornbridge Jaipur IPA	Weetwood Oasthouse Gold
2007	York Centurion's Ghost	Inveralmond Lia Fail	Brain's SA Gold
2008	Thornbridge, Jaipur IPA (Derbyshire)	Fuller's, ESB (London)	Highland, Orkney Blast (Orkney)
2009	West Berkshire, Dr Hexter's Healer (Berkshire)	Thornbridge, Kipling (Derbyshire)	Grain, Tamarind IPA (Norfolk)
2010	Thornbridge Jaipur IPA	Fuller's Gales HSB (London)	Beckstones Rev Rob
2011	Moles, Moles Catcher	Kinver, Half Centurion	Adnams, Broadside
2012	Dark Star, Festival (Horsham, West Sussex)	O'Hanlon's, Stormstay (Whimple, Devon)	Highland, Orkney IPA (Swannay, Orkney)
2013	Beeston, On the huh (Norfolk)	Marble, Dobber (Greater Manchester)	Castle Rock, Screech Owl (Nottingham)
2014	Church End, Fallen Angel	Blue Monkey, Ape Ale	Loch Ness, HoppyNESS
2015	Dark Star, Revelation	Salopian, Golden Thread	Grain, India Pale Ale
2016	Heavy Industry, 77	Hawkshead, NZPA	Adnams, Ghost Ship
2017	Grey Trees, Afghan Pale Ale (Rhondda Cynon Taff)	Barngates, Red Bull Terrier (Cumbria)	Salopian, Automaton (Shropshire)
2018	Fuller's (Dark Star), Revelation (West Sussex)	Bay, Devon Dumpling (Devon)	Kinver, Half Centurion (Staffordshire)
2019	Grey Trees, Afghan IPA (Rhondda Cynon Taff)	Irving, Iron Duke (Hampshire)	Church End, Fallen Angel (Warwickshire)
2020	Category closed		
Source: Champion Beer of Britain Results

==== Speciality Beer category (1996–2019) ====
Year	Gold	Silver	Bronze
1996	Harviestoun Schiehallion (Clackmannanshire)	Passageway St Arnold	Brewery on Sea Spinnaker Buzz
1997	Harviestoun Schiehallion (Clackmannanshire)	Passageway St Arnold	Nethergate Umbel Magana
1998	Freeminer Shakemantle Ginger Ale	Dark Horse Fallen Angel	Daleside Morocco Ale (Yorkshire)
1999	Harviestoun Schiehallion (Clackmannanshire)	Nethergate Umbel Magna	Dark Star Zingibier
2000	Nethergate Umbel Ale	Oakham White Dwarf (Cambridgeshire)	Heather Ale Fraoch
2001	Oakham White Dwarf (Cambridgeshire)	Harviestoun Schiehallion (Clackmannanshire)	Cheriton Village Elder
2002	Oakham White Dwarf (Cambridgeshire)	Harviestoun Schiehallion (Clackmannanshire)	Nethergate Umbel Magna
2003	Cheriton Village Elder	Daleside Morocco (Yorkshire)	Oakham White Dwarf (Cambridgeshire)
2004	Cairngorm Tradewinds	Harviestoun Schiehallion (Clackmannanshire)	Titanic Iceberg
2005	Cairngorm Tradewinds	Young's Waggledance	Daleside Morocco (Yorkshire); Ridleys Rumpus
2006	Cairngorm Tradewinds	Wolf Straw Dog	William Brothers Fraoch
2007	Nethergate Umbel Magna	Little Valley Hebden Wheat	St Peter's Grapefruit
2008	Otley, OGarden (Mid Glamorgan)	Wentworth, Bumble Beer (South Yorkshire)	Nethergate, Umbel Magna (Essex)
2009	Nethergate, Umbel Magna (Essex)	Wentworth, Bumble Beer (South Yorkshire)	Amber, Chocolate Orange Stout (Derbyshire)
2010	Amber Chocolate Orange Stout	O'Hanlon's Port Stout	Breconshire Ysbrid y Ddraig
2011	Oakleaf, I cant believe it's not bitter	Amber, Chocolate Orange Stout	Orkney, Atlas Wayfarer
2012	Dunham Massey, Chocolate Cherry Mild (Dunham Massey, Gtr Manchester)	Little Valley, Hebden's Wheat (Hebden Bridge, West Yorkshire)	Nethergate, Umbel Magna (Pentlow, Essex)
2013	Nethergate, Umbel Magna (Suffolk)	Saltaire, Triple Chocolate (West Yorkshire)	Conwy, Honey Fayre (Conwy)
2014	Saltaire, Triple Chocoholic	Offbeat, Way Out Wheat	Peak Ales, Chatsworth Gold
2015	Titanic, Plum Porter	Kissingate, Black Cherry Mild; Saltaire, Triple Chocolate	Hanlons, Port Stout
2016	Binghams, Vanilla Stout (Berkshire)	Saltaire, Triple Chocoholic	Titanic, Plum Porter
2017	Saltaire, Triple Chocoholic (West Yorkshire)	Blackedge, Black Port Porter (Greater Manchester)	Cromarty, Red Rocker (Highland)
2018	Colchester, Brazilian Coffee & Vanilla Porter (Essex)	Cromarty, Red Rocker (Highlands & Western Isles)	Derventio, Cleopatra (Derbyshire)
2019	Binghams, Vanilla Stout (Berkshire)	Blue Monkey, Chocolate Guerilla (Nottinghamshire)	Colchester, Brazilian Coffee & Vanilla Porter (Essex)
2020	Competition cancelled due to COVID-19 pandemic		
2023	Category moved to Winter Festival		
Source: Champion Beer of Britain Results
