= Kelham Island =

Kelham Island may refer to:

- Kelham Island Quarter, one of the eleven quarters of Sheffield City Centre
- Kelham Island Museum, an industrial museum, part of the Sheffield Industrial Museums Trust, located in the above quarter
- Kelham Island Brewery, a brewery located in the above quarter
