= Mighty Oaks =

Mighty Oaks may refer to:

- SUNY-ESF Mighty Oaks, collegiate sports teams, Syracuse, New York
- Mighty Oaks (band), indie and folk band from Berlin, Germany, founded in 2010
- Mighty Oak Brewery, brewery in Maldon, Essex, UK
- Mighty Oak (film), a 2020 American film

== See also ==
- From Mighty Oaks, record album by Ray Thomas
