= William Moorhouse =

William Moorhouse may refer to:

- William Barnard Rhodes-Moorhouse, nephew of the above, first airman to be awarded the Victoria Cross
- William Moorhouse, 19th century founder of Moorhouse's Brewery
- William Sefton Moorhouse, 19th century New Zealand politician
