= Crouch Vale Brewery =

Independent brewery based in South Woodham Ferrers, Essex, England

- Industry: Alcoholic beverage
- Founded: 1981
- Headquarters: South Woodham Ferrers, Essex; England
- Products: Beer
- Owner: Independent

The Crouch Vale Brewery is an independent brewery based in South Woodham Ferrers, Essex, England. Its name is derived from its proximity to the River Crouch. Having been established in 1981, it is the oldest brewer in Essex. They have a roster of regular draught beers which are produced year round, as well as several popular seasonal beers which are produced at certain times of the year.

Being an Essex based brewery, their beers are most widely available in the South East of England but the popularity of the beers leads to them often being dispensed at beer festivals in more remote locations. Despite their traditionalism, the brewers have a propensity for use of foreign hops (largely from the U.S. and Germany); this is especially true of their seasonal brews, which can often be more 'experimental' than their regular ales, but no less popular.

The brewery's flagship ale is Crouch Vale Brewers Gold, and accounts for more than 50% of their total output. This particular beer, a 4.0% Golden Ale, was the winner of the Champion Beer of Britain award at both the 2005 and 2006 Campaign for Real Ale (CAMRA) Great British Beer Festivals.

== Regular beers ==
- Brewers Gold - 4.0% Golden Ale
- Essex Boys Best Bitter - 3.8% Bitter
- Yakima Gold - 4.2% Golden Ale
- Amarillo - 5.0% Golden Ale
- Blackwater Mild - 3.7% Mild

== Notable seasonal beers ==
- Brewers Gold Extra - 5.2% Golden Ale based on the award-winning Brewers Gold, but stronger
- The Conkeror - 4.3% Autumn Ale, notable for winning the Cask ale category of the Aarhus, Denmark Beer Festival 2002; some way from Essex!
