= Mordue =

Mordue is an English surname.

Notable people with this surname include:

- Eddie Mordue (1928–2011), British saxophonist
- Jackie Mordue (1886–1938), English footballer
- Jennifer Mordue, British entomologist
- Norman A. Mordue (1942–2022), American judge
- Shayna Mordue, former name of Shayna Rose (born 1983), American actress
- Tom Mordue (1905–1975), English footballer
