= David Bruce (brewer) =

British businessman

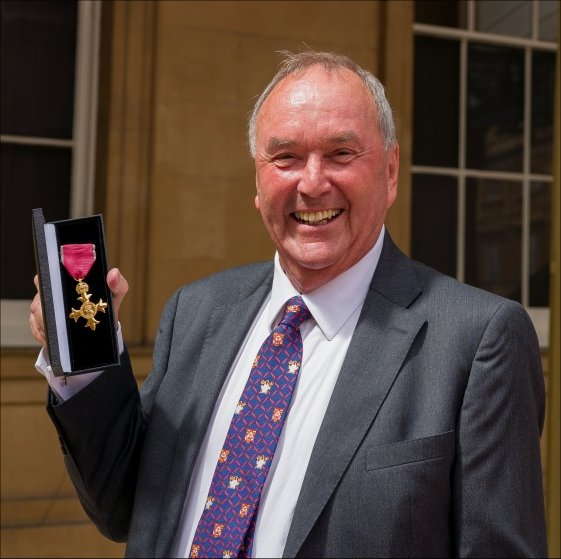
- Bruce in 2022
- Born: Alexander David Michael Bruce
- Occupation: Entrepreneur
- Known for: Firkin Pub Chain, Bruce's Brewery (founded in 1979) and The Bruce Trust

Alexander David Michael Bruce is a British entrepreneur who has been involved in production and retailing within the international brewing and leisure industry since 1966.

== Career ==
Bruce began his career in 1966, brewing with both Courage Brewery and Theakston Brewery (in North Yorkshire) for six years. This was immediately followed by six years licensed retail work with Charram Ltd and The Star Group of Companies.

=== Firkin Brewery ===
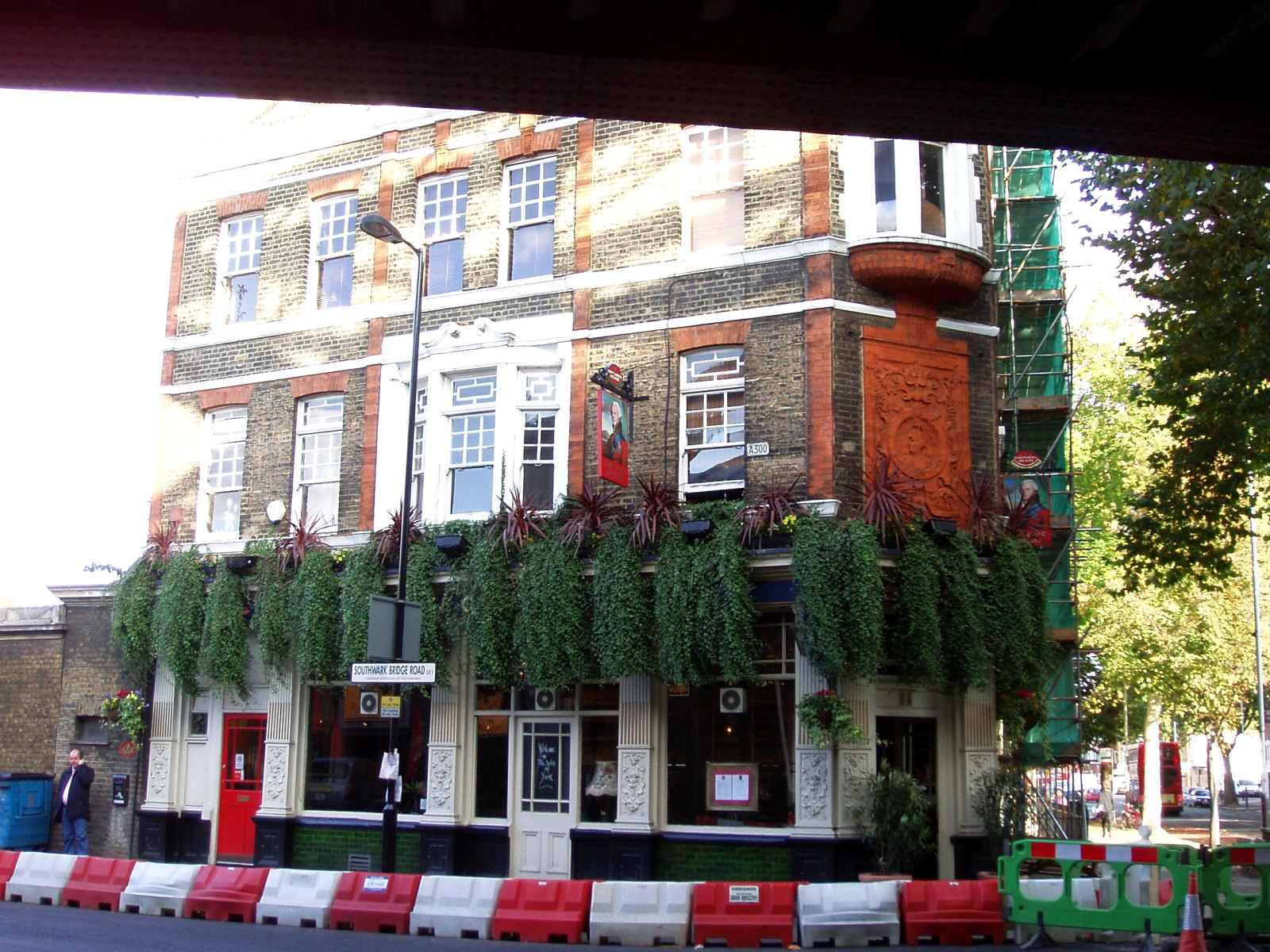
The Duke of York on Borough Road SE1, the former Goose and Firkin, where the Firkin empire began

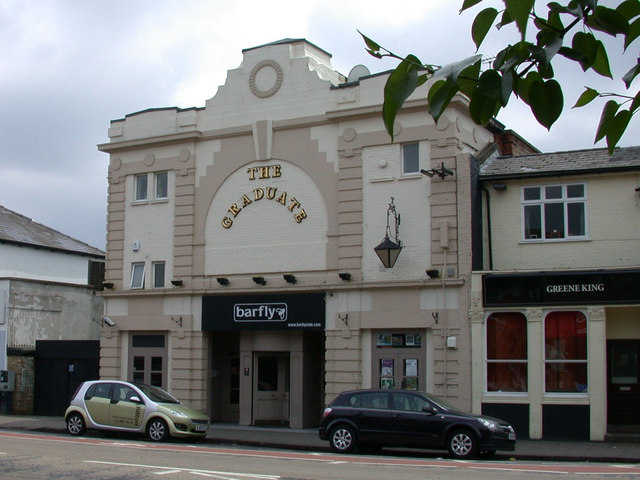
The Graduate in Cambridge, the former Fresher and Firkin

Bruce went on to found the Firkin Pub chain and Bruce's Brewery, which started as a single pub in Elephant and Castle, London, in 1979. Peter Austin oversaw his choice of kit and the design for its small basement brewery. He borrowed £10,000, secured against his house, and opened the Goose and Firkin at 47 Borough Road (A3202) next to the junction of Southwark Bridge Road and a railway bridge leading to Blackfriars station over the river to the north, and close to the Ministry of Sound and the Student Centre of the Polytechnic of the South Bank (now London South Bank University). The pub is now the Duke of York. By 1986 he had six Firkin pubs and ten by 1988, turning over £3m; at the time Britain had 75,000 pubs. The pubs sold their own beer, Dogbolter. Each pub cost around £250,000. The Firkin motto was Usque ad Mortem Bibendum ("drink until you die").

In February 1988, Bruce put his eleven Firkin pubs up for sale, selling them for £6.6m in May 1988 to European Leisure. The chain would grow to 170 sites under a succession of owners until it was bought in 1999 by Punch Taverns, who retired the brand the following year.

Following the sale of the Firkin pubs and Bruce's Brewery, Bruce set up The Bruce Trust

=== The Capital Pub Company ===
Bruce was Non-Executive Director of The Capital Pub Company PLC, which he co-founded with Clive Watson. The Capital Pub Company PLC raised over £15million under the EIS and was admitted to AIM in June 2007. It was acquired by Greene King for £93m in July 2011.

=== Grosvenor Inns ===
Bruce was Executive Director of Grosvenor Inns PLC, where he was responsible for the roll-out of the Slug and Lettuce brand, where he worked with Tim Thwaites.

In October 2011, again with Clive Watson, Bruce co-founded The City Pub Co East and The City Pub Co West, raising £28m in EIS funds.

=== Cobbs Farm ===
Bruce is chairman of Cobbs Farm Co., a Hungerford-based multi-site farm shop business established in 2006 as The Country Food and Dining Company.

=== West Berkshire Brewery plc ===
Bruce became chairman of West Berkshire Brewery on 28 March 2013, and promoted the business to potential investors. The business went into administration in December 2021 following challenges in the pub and brewing sector as a result of Covid. Unsecured creditors included HMRC and Hawkridge Distillers.

In August 2021, several former staff of the West Berkshire Brewery plc made allegations against the West Berkshire Brewery plc of sexism and bullying.

=== Hawkridge Distillers Ltd ===
It was announced on 15 August 2021 that Bruce had been appointed non-executive chairman of Hawkridge Distillers Ltd, a gin distilling and marketing business.

=== The Renegade Pub Co.1 Ltd ===
Bruce was a director of another brewing related enterprise which went into administration, The Renegade Pub Co.1 Limited (a subsidiary of West Berkshire Brewery). Following the demise of this business, its remnants were sold to Mosaic Pubs in 2022. The largest creditor was West Berkshire Brewery; others included HM Revenue & Customs Debt Management.

== Charities ==
Bruce is the chair of the trustees of the Bruce Trust, a charity registered in 1988 which designed a small fleet of accessible canal boats based at Great Bedwyn on the Kennet and Avon Canal. In 2016, the boats were donated to the Kennet and Avon Canal Trust, which continues to administer and operate them.

Another charity was registered in 2013, the Bruce Charitable Foundation, which designed, developed and operated a six-berth motorhome, complete with hospital bed, to provide holidays for wheelchair users. The vehicle was sold in 2016 to The Southern Spinal Injuries Trust and therefore the charity was dissolved by Bruce in 2019.

== Honours ==
Bruce was appointed OBE in June 2021 for services to charity.
