= Elland Brewery =

Former award-winning brewery in Yorkshire, England

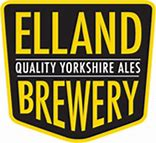
- Industry: Alcoholic beverage
- Founded: 2002
- Headquarters: Elland, West Yorkshire, England
- Products: Beer
- Owner: Independent

Elland Brewery was an independent brewery based in Elland, West Yorkshire, England. Founded as ‘Eastwood and Sanders Fine Ales’ in 2002, after the amalgamation of The West Yorkshire Brewery and The Barge and Barrel Brewing Company, it was renamed as Elland Brewery in 2006 and traded under that banner until its winding-up in 2024. They had a catalogue of regular draught beers produced year round, as well as several popular seasonal beers produced at certain times of the year.

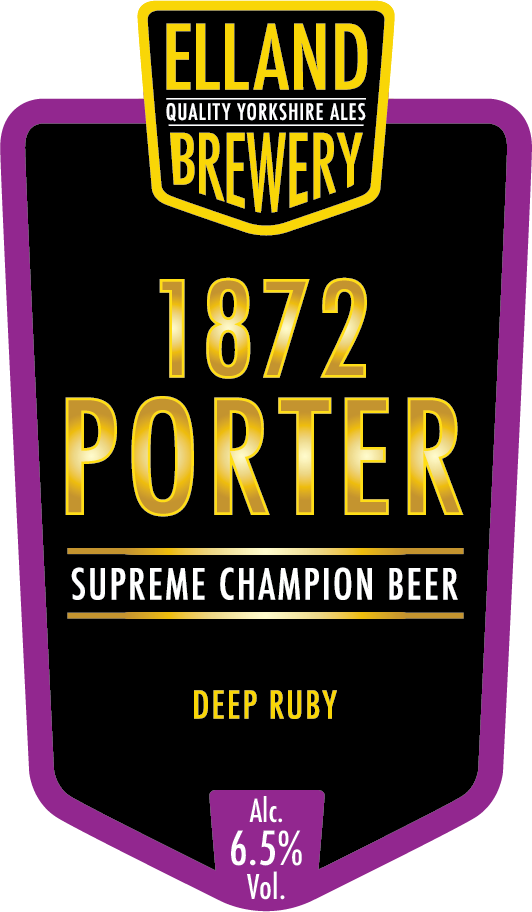

Being a West Yorkshire based brewery, their beers are most widely available in the North of England but the popularity of the beers means they are often found at beer festivals in more remote locations. Despite their traditionalism, the brewers have a preference for using foreign hops (largely from the U.S., New Zealand and Germany); this is especially true of their seasonal brews, which are often considered more 'edgy' than their regular ales, but just as popular.

== Top awards ==
The brewery's flagship ale was Elland 1872 Porter, and accounted for more than 20% of their total output. This beer was a 6.5% Porter, was twice the winner of the Champion Beer of Britain award, at the Campaign for Real Ale (CAMRA) GBBF 2013 and 2023 Great British Beer Festivals.

In 2023, Elland 1872 Porter won the CAMRA Champion Beer of Britain top prize for the second time.

== Regular beers ==
- Elland Blonde - 4.0% Golden Ale
- White Prussian - 3.9% Pale Ale
- Nettle Thrasher - 4.4% Bitter
- South Sea Pale - 4.1% Pale Ale
- 1872 Porter - 6.5% Porter

== Notable seasonal/special beers ==
- Summer Breeze - 4.6% Pale Ale
- Game Changer - 5.3% Throwback IPA
- 1872 Port Brett Special - 7.5% barrel-aged porter, featuring Brettanomyces secondary fermentation. The release was limited to just eight pins in 2022.
