= Blue Monkey Brewery =

Microbrewery in England

- Type: Brewery
- Location: Manners Industrial Estate, Ilkeston, UK Border of Nottinghamshire and Derbyshire
- Opened: 8 October 2008
- Key people: John Hickling
- Annual production volume: 2,700 hectolitres (1,600 imp bbl)

Active beers
Ape ale, Guerilla Porter (a stout), BG Sips, Red Baboons, and Evolution
Name	Type

Blue Monkey Brewery is a 20 barrel microbrewery located on the border of Nottinghamshire and Derbyshire. Founded in Ilkeston in 2008, the company doubled its capacity and moved to Giltbrook in 2010. It produces beers, including Ape Ale and Guerrilla Porter. It currently has four outlets; The Organ Grinder Nottingham, The Organ Grinder Loughborough, The Organ Grinder Newark and The Coffee Grinder Arnold

== History ==
Blue Monkey Brewery was founded in the Manners Industrial Estate, Ilkeston on 8 October 2008 by John Hickling, with a capacity of ten barrels. Prior to the brewery venture, Hickling worked in an IT role for ten years, for HBOS banking and insurance company. He was well-paid, and considered it a "job for life", but found it unsatisfying. He considered various alternative career paths, but the idea of running a brewery stuck with him, and when he reached 30 years of age, he decided to try it, and quit his job to start the brewery. He attended the specialist Brewlab faculty at the University of Sunderland for a course in brewing, and then offered to work for free at breweries to gain experience. He began working for Jarrow Brewery.

In 2008, Jarrow Brewery ceased beer production at the Robin Hood pub in Jarrow, South Tyneside, moving operations to the Maltings pub in South Shields. The Robin Hood was retained as their corporate headquarters, storage and distribution.

Hickling purchased the brewing plant apparatus from Jarrow, to set up his own brewery in a unit in the Ilkeston industrial park.

He tried out 22 brews, before selecting one for the launch. The first beer, Original, was the best-selling beer at a Nottingham beer festival, selling 1,224 pints in under three days. It was a modest 3.6% ABV.

Initially, they brewed beer once per week. Working 12-hour shifts, Hickling said that his new career was "a real contrast. I've found I've had jobs in the past which were nice, comfortable office jobs. There was a point last year where I was down on my hands and knees scrubbing a drain thinking 'hang on what have I done with my life'?" However, the business grew quickly, with demand outstripping the supply capabilities.

Their first public appearance was at the 2008 Robin Hood Beer Festival in Nottingham. The following year, at the same festival, the company unveiled Guerilla Porter, exactly one year to the day after the company launch. It was declared the annual champion beer by the Midlands in the Society for Independent Brewers, after winning in the porters, strong milds, old ales and stouts categories. Ape Ale was awarded a bronze medal in the strong bitters category. The festival is sponsored by the Nottingham branch of CAMRA; Spyke Golding, the chairman, said of Guerilla "Unlike some stouts it's not overly heavy and it's not cloying."

By mid-2009, they had delivered beer to over 100 establishments. An extra fermenter was installed in 2009, raising production to around 9000 pints per week. By the end of 2009, they were shipping 40,000 pints per month, and expanded production capacity to 20 barrels. The company needed larger premises, and in 2010 it relocated to the Giltbrook Industrial Park, in Pentrich Road, just behind the Giltbrook Retail Park, a £70m shopping complex which opened in 2008. The site is capable of producing approximately 100,000 pints per month. The new location is very close to the site of the former Kimberley Brewery, which was the last independent brewery in Nottinghamshire before its closure in 2006.

Blue Monkey Brewery is a member of the Derbyshire Brewers' Collective.

== Beers ==
Original, the first beer, is a 3.6% ABV amber or copper coloured session ale, "packed full of flavour".

Beers include Ape ale, Guerilla Porter (a stout), BG Sips, Red Baboons, and Evolution.

Guerrilla Porter is 4.9% ABV.

Organ Grinder, 4.6% ABV, and Guerilla, 4.9% ABV, were both launched at the Robin Hood festival in October 2009.

Organ Grinder is a "copper coloured ale, with a duo of unusual hops from New Zealand to give it an interesting twist."

99 Red Baboons is 4.2% ABV, and described by CAMRA as "An unusual combination of fruity hoppyness with a dark, malty side."

99 Red Baboons has been described as hard to definitively categorize as either a porter or a mild, being an "unusual combination of fruity hoppiness with a dark, malty side" which is

Simians Summer, 3.6% ABV, is an amber bitter, and was on sale in September 2010.

Amarillo is 3.9% ABV, and according to CAMRA it is a gold coloured beer with a white head. Citrus aroma with fruity, hoppy notes. Hints of orange & peach".

Ape Ale has an ABV of 5.4%, described by CAMRA as "A complex and sophisticated IPA, using assertive American hops. Aromas of resinous pine & orange."

Ape Ale contains American hop varieties, including Simcoe and Chinook.

It has "Aromas of resinous pine, orange and just the right level of citrussiness. A dry finish and moderate bitterness".

BG Sips, at 4% ABV, is a "Pale, intensely hoppy bitter with a peppery bitterness" according to CAMRA.

BG Sips was awarded a gold medal at the 2009 Peterborough Beer Festival in the category 'best beer from a new brewery'. Peterborough beer festival is the second largest in the country. The beer is described by Hickling as "pale, hoppy and weak enough that it's not going to knock you out". Peterborough beer festival is the second largest in the country.

The "BG" stands for "Brewers Gold", which is a variety of hops. The beer contains other hop varieties, giving it "tropical fruit aromas and peppery bitterness". It has a pale golden colour.

Evolution was produced in celebration of the 150th anniversary of the birth of Charles Darwin.

Evolution is pale ale, and has a light golden colour.

It contains Northdown, Goldings and Styrian Goldings varieties of hops.

It has a "pronounced citrus aroma that leads onto a lingering bitterness and dry finish".

Sanctuary is brewed only for two specific establishments—the Hand and Heart and The Roundhouse, both in Nottingham town centre.

Their beers are sold in local pubs, with one of the first regular customers being The Waggon and Horses in Bleasby. Other customers include the Three Tuns in Eastwood, the Larks Nest in Nuthall, and Guitar Bar in Sherwood Rise, the Flowerpot in Derby and the Dewdrop in Ilkeston itself; it is also distributed nationally.

For the opening ceremony of the new premises in Giltbrook, a special stronger version of Evolution was produced, called Revolution.

== Name ==
Hickling says he spent months trying to think of a name for the enterprise, and then the idea of "blue monkey" came to him in a dream; however locally the term "blue monkeys" used to describe the blue flames produced by the nearby Stanton Ironworks factory, which were once visible in the area . Hickling's grandfather, Tom Hickling, worked at the factory throughout his working life. Hickling believes this to be purely coincidental.

The 'monkey' in the logo is, in fact, not a monkey, but a chimpanzee which is an ape.

== Awards ==
- Guerilla: Supreme Champion Beer of the Midlands, 2009 SIBA Midlands Competition
- BG Sips: Gold (in category), 2009 Peterborough CAMRA Beer Festival
- Ape Ale: Bronze (in category), 2009 SIBA Midlands Competition
- Guerrilla: National Champion Stout, 2010 SIBA National Competition
- BG Sips: Gold (overall), 2010 Maldon CAMRA beer Festival
- 99 Red Baboons: Gold (overall), 2010 Hinckley CAMRA Beer Festival
- BG Sips: Silver (overall), 2010 Devises CAMRA Beer Festival
- Evolution: Silver (overall), 2010 Derby CAMRA Beer Festival
- 99 Red Baboons: Beer of the Festival Hinckley CAMRA Beer Festival 2010
