= Madrí Excepcional =

British lager beer

The red branding for Madri

Madrí Excepcional is a British beer developed in Burton on Trent by Coors, the parent company of Carling, with some input from their Spanish brewery subsidiary in Toledo, La Sagra; it is manufactured in Tadcaster, England. In 2024, it was the fourth most sold lager in the UK. It is also brewed in Canada by Molson Coors for the Canadian market.

== Style ==
The beer is a European-style lager with 4.6% ABV. The beer was originally developed and brewed for the British and Irish markets.

== Presence ==
It was introduced to pubs in 2020; by 2022, due to intensive marketing, it had become one of the 10 best selling lagers in the United Kingdom. Off-trade sales began in 2022.

== Marketing ==
The packaging uses a red design featuring a chulapo man in a cap and houndstooth waistcoat, echoing the Moretti branding. It trades heavily on its Spanish associations, using the slogan "El Alma de Madrid" ("the soul of Madrid"); however, it is brewed in Tadcaster, which has long been a centre for British brewing. The beer is aimed at the premium end of the British and Irish lager market.

The beer's overtly Spanish branding has drawn accusations of dishonesty and inauthenticity, with The Sunday Times describing Madrí as "the biggest illusion in British brewing history". Although Molson Coors claims that Madrí was created in partnership with its Toledo La Sagra subsidiary and promotes the beer under the slogan "the Soul of Madrid", the brewery is not known in the city; Mahou and El Águila are more popular amongst Spanish beer drinkers.

== Legal proceedings ==
In December 2025, an application for a declaration of invalidity was filed with the European Union Intellectual Property Office against the Madrí Excepcional figurative European Union trade mark (EUTM No. 018292728). The application concerns the typographic elements used in the brand's visual identity.
