= Nethergate Brewery =

Brewery in England

- Industry: Alcoholic beverage
- Founded: 1986
- Headquarters: Rodbridge, Long Melford, Suffolk; England
- Products: Beer
- Owner: Independent

Nethergate Brewery was established in 1986 in Clare, Suffolk, England by former Head Brewer Ian Hornsey and his business partner Dick Burge. In 2005 the brewery site was moved across the county border to Pentlow in Essex. In 2010 the brewery was sold to anonymous buyers. From 2017 the brewery was based, back in Suffolk, in the hamlet of Rodbridge, near Long Melford.

== Brewing history ==
The brewery originally concentrated on cask ale and for a while only brewed Best Bitter, based on traditional recipes for the Yorkshire bitter style. Over the next four years this beer was joined by two other brews; firstly the Old Growler Porter, and then the IPA (in this case, IPA is also claimed to stand for "Ian's Personal Ale", in honour of the Head Brewer). Nethergate's interest in traditional ingredients also saw the creation of two of their most distinctive beers - Umbel Ale, and the stronger Umbel Magna - through the use of a traditional ingredient which had been ignored by brewers for many years: coriander. Nethergate then ventured in the bottled beer market, with Old Growler and Umbel ale being sold in the more specialist off licences and Tesco stores in the south east.

In October 2010, Burge retired and the brewery was sold to a consortium including ex-Adnams employees Rob Flanagan, Mark Holmes and Mike Atkinson. Nethergate continued its positive growth, winning the Good Pub Guide 'Brewery of the Year' title in 2011 and in 2012 underwent a rebranding exercise which emphasised the brewery's new location across the county border and promoted the 'Growler Brewery' name on pump clips and bottle labels. As part of this exercise two of the brewery's regular beers, Suffolk County Best Bitter and Augustinian Ale, were discontinued from the core range.

On 18 March 2014 the brewery went into administration and consortium led by founder Dick Burge purchased the brewery in April 2014. Brewing resumed under the 'Nethergate Brewery' name and a primary focus on selling beer to local free houses.

== Notable beers ==
Nethergate's core range currently consists of three beers:

- Venture - 3.7% English Session
- Old Growler - 5.0% English porter
- Stour Valley Gold - 4.2% Hoppy Golden
- Suffolk County - 4.0% Traditional Best Bitter

The brewery also produce a number of seasonal beers including:

- Umbel Ale - 3.8% Coriander beer
- Umbel Magna - 5.0% Porter brewed with coriander
- Lemon Head - 4.0% Golden Ale brewed with lemon and ginger
- Augustinian - 4.5% Best Bitter
- Essex Border - 4.8% Blonde Ale
- Melford Mild - 3.7% Mild Ale
- White Stout – 4.5% Stout brewed with vanilla pods and cocoa nibs

The Brewery also has a sub brand which beer is available in cans. Growling Dog

- Tropical Ipa - 7.5% IPA
- Milk Stout - 6.5% Stout
