= Thornbridge Brewery =

Brewery at Bakewell, England

- Type: Private
- Industry: Brewing
- Founded: 2005
- Headquarters: Derbyshire, England
- Key people: Jim Harrison & Simon Webster
- Products: Beer
- Production output: 30,000 hectolitre capacity
- Website: www.thornbridgebrewery.co.uk

Thornbridge Brewery is a brewery in Bakewell, Derbyshire, England, known for its Jaipur West Coast IPA beer.

== History ==
The first Thornbridge beers were produced in 2005 on a 10-barrel brewing kit housed in outbuildings at Thornbridge Hall.

A new 30-barrel brewery, at a former car sales showroom in Bakewell, opened in 2009.

As of 2015, the brewery operates 12 pubs and exports its beers to 33 countries.

In 2024, with the support of Brooklyn Brewery using equipment donated by Marston's Brewery, Thornbridge recommissioned the only remaining, working Burton Union brewing set.

== Awards ==
At the World Beer Awards, Thornbridge Brewery won gold medals in 2012, 2013, 2014 and 2015. In the World Beer Cup it won silver medals in 2010 and 2014, and a bronze medal in 2012.

In 2012, Jaipur IPA was named as one of The Top 50 food and drink products in Britain by the Guild of Fine Food. Two years later it was selected as Best Drinks Producer in the BBC Radio 4 Food and Farming Awards.

== Beers ==
=== Core cask beers ===
- Brother Rabbit (4% ABV) - golden ale
- Jaipur (5.9% ABV) - India pale ale
- Kipling (5.2% ABV) - South Pacific pale ale
- Lord Marples (4% ABV) - best bitter
- Wild Swan (3.5% ABV) - white gold pale ale

=== Core keg beers ===
- AM.PM (4.5% ABV) - all day IPA
- Chiron (5% ABV) - American pale ale
- Colorado Red (5.9% ABV) - English hopped red ale
- Halcyon (7.4% ABV) - Imperial IPA
- Jaipur (5.9% ABV) - IPA
- Jamestown (5.9% ABV) - New England India pale ale
- Wild Raven (6.6% ABV) - black IPA

=== Core bottled beers ===
- AM.PM (4.5% ABV) - all day IPA
- Bracia (10% ABV) - rich dark ale
- Chiron (5% ABV) - American pale ale
- Cocoa Wonderland (6.8% ABV) - chocolate porter
- Colorado Red (5.9% ABV) - English hopped red ale
- Jaipur (5.9% ABV) - IPA
- Halcyon (7.4% ABV) - Imperial IPA
- Twin Peaks (5% ABV) - Anglo American pale ale
- Tzara (4.8% ABV) - Kölsch
- Wild Raven (6.6% ABV) - black IPA
- Wild Swan (3.5% ABV) - white gold pale ale
