= King and Barnes =

English brewery in Horsham, Sussex

King and Barnes was a family-owned English brewery in Horsham, Sussex.

== History ==
The brewery, founded around 1800 as Satchell & Co., was later bought out by maltster James King and renamed King & Sons. In 1906, another Horsham brewer, G.H. Barnes and Co., merged with King & Sons thus forming King and Barnes. The company was taken over in 2000 by Hall and Woodhouse. The brewery building was sold off and demolished for housing.

The pubs are now managed by Hall and Woodhouse, while the Hall and Woodhouse Badger Brewery acquired the rights to the King & Barnes brand names. The brewery's cask ales were very popular in the local area; while King & Barnes had also gained a wider reputation for their bottle-conditioned beers.

In 2001, Bill King of King & Barnes formed a small brewery in Horsham, WJ King & Co. The ex-head brewer Andy Hepworth also formed a brewery in the town which as well as their own beers contract-brews and bottles for other companies.

== Notable beers ==
- Sussex Bitter
- Festive
- Broadwood
- Old Ale
- Mild
