= Coors Brewers =

UK arm of Molson Coors Beverage Company

Coors Brewers Limited, later known as Molson Coors Brewing Company (UK) Limited, is the UK arm of Molson Coors Beverage Company. Its headquarters is in Burton upon Trent, Staffordshire. The company originates from Bass Brewers Limited. The company has gone through many name changes and mergers.

== History ==
The company originates from Bass Brewers Limited founded in 1777. In 1926 Bass Brewery merged with William Worthington's. The company was purchased in 2000 by Interbrew and then forced to change its name due to the purchase by Coors in 2002, as Interbrew kept the brand name Bass.

In 2009 following the merger between Molson and Coors in 2006, Coors Brewers Limited changed its name to Molson Coors Brewing Company (UK) Ltd. The operations in England are now part of Molson Coors Europe.

== Brands ==
Coors' brands are shown below. Prominently it owns the sole contract to produce Carling in the UK; it also produces Coors and Doom Bar.

Brands include:

- Aspall
- Blue Moon
- Caffreys
- Carling
- Carling Premier
- Carling Cider
- Cobra
- Coors
- Franciscan Well
- Hop Stuff
- Madrí Excepcional (collaboration with La Sagra brewery)
- Miller Genuine Draft
- Mitchells and Butlers Brew XI
- Mitchells and Butlers Mild
- Molson Canadian
- Pravha
- Staropramen
- Stones Bitter
- Sharp's
- Three Fold Hard Seltzer
- Worthington Bitter
- Worthington E
- Worthington White Shield

The company imports / distributes:

- Bavaria
- Bavaria 0.0
- Bodega Bay Hard Seltzer
- Rekorderlig Cider

== Sites ==
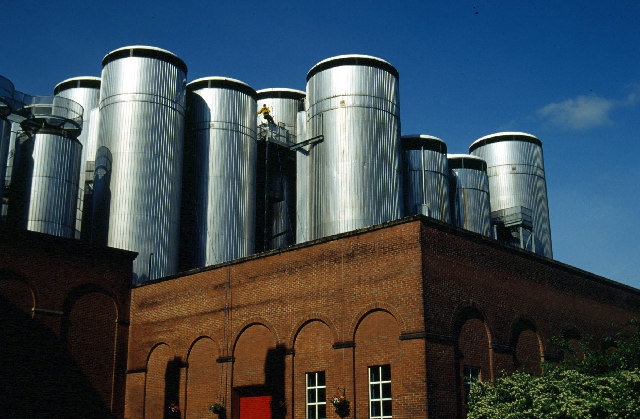
The Coors site at Burton

The UK arm of the company has three main sites: Burton Brewery containing an additional maltings facility (formerly AllBrew's Maltings), which is currently out of action and Tadcaster Brewery. Burton is the largest site followed by Tadcaster. Shobnall Maltings provides the malt for all their UK sites and many other breweries in the UK. Also Burton Brewery houses the National Brewery Centre (formerly Coors Visitor Centre); within the museum complex is the White Shield Brewery, this brews all special and limited run beers and also is the sole production site for Worthington White Shield.

The company has the capacity to turn the barley into malt, and brew, bottle, can, keg and cask beer.

The Company currently the 5th largest brewer in the world with a 20% market share has recently bought out the majority share in Cobra, and is running contracts for Scottish & Newcastle and Magners Cider.

== Internet operations ==
Coors Brewers offer their customers the option of ordering online through two websites, barbox.com and coorsdirect.com. barbox.com was formerly owned by Coors Brewers in a partnership with Scottish & Newcastle before being acquired by iTradeNetwork. iTradeNetwork now provide the online ordering facilities for Molson Coors through barbox.com and coorsdirect.com
