= Jennifer Mordue =

British entomologist

- Education: University of Sheffield (BSc)
- Scientific career
- Workplaces: University of Aberdeen

A. Jennifer Mordue FRES FRSB is an entomologist in the United Kingdom. She is Emeritus Professor of Zoology at the University of Aberdeen, the first female professor of zoology at the university.

== Education and career ==
Mordue was educated at the University of Sheffield graduating with a BSc in Zoology.

== Research ==
Mordue's research has looked at why humans have different attractiveness to insects such as biting midges Culicoides impunctatus, later research showed that taller people were more likely to be bitten.

Mordue researched the sex pheromone n-heptadecane of the biting midge Culicoides nubeculosus, this could be used to make a trap to lure the insects away from livestock and humans.

She has also researched the DNA of the several Culicoides species of midges that transmit bluetongue, a disease of livestock.

In 2002 Mordue was awarded the Lampitt Medal for outstanding services to the Society of Chemical Industry.
