= Oakleaf Brewery =

Former brewery in Gosport, Hampshire, England

Oakleaf
- Industry: Alcoholic beverage
- Founded: 2000
- Headquarters: Gosport, Hampshire, England
- Products: Beer

Oakleaf was a Gosport-based brewery founded in 2000 in Gosport, Hampshire, England. It brewed cask ales and bottled ales until filing for Administration in August 2016 due to the rise of microbreweries. In September 2016, the brewery was purchased, staff rescued from administration and the new brewery, Fallen Acorn Brewing Co, began.

== Ales ==
=== Cask and Bottled Ales ===
- Hole Hearted
- Quercus Folium
- Nuptu' Ale
- Pompey Royal
- I Can't Believe It's Not Bitter
- IPA

=== Bottled only ales ===
- May Bee Mild
- Stokers Stout
- Blakes Gosport Bitter
- Over the Top
- Blakes Heaven (Stronger version of Blakes Gosport Bitter)
