= Batemans Brewery =

Brewery based in Wainfleet, Lincolnshire, England

Coordinates: 53.103°N 0.23°E

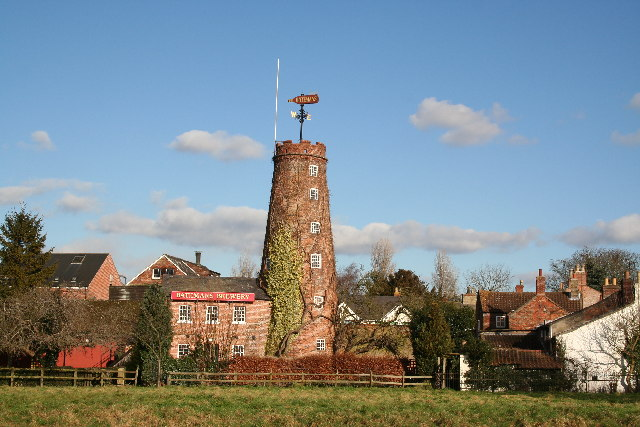
- Bateman's Brewery and Salem Bridge Mill
- Industry: Alcoholic beverage
- Founded: 1874
- Founder: George Bateman
- Headquarters: Wainfleet, Lincolnshire, England
- Products: Beer

Batemans Brewery (George Bateman & Son Ltd) is an English brewery based at Salem Bridge Brewery in Wainfleet, Lincolnshire, and founded in 1874. The company owns 69 public houses, with 23 situated in Boston alone. The brewery focuses on cask conditioned ales, their best known being XB and XXXB. Their slogan is "Good Honest Ales".

== Early history ==
Batemans was founded in 1874 by George Bateman, a local farmer who sold his farm in nearby Friskney in order to rent a brewery in Wainfleet, situated by the railway. He bought the brewery equipment for £505 10s (roughly equivalent to £30,000 today); a year later he bought the lease for £800. Before he retired, Edwin Crowe, from whom Bateman had bought his equipment, passed on his knowledge of the craft to George and his wife Suzanna (who had had a little experience of home brewing). Crowe's expert brewer stayed on with Bateman for some years, despite his blindness.

In 1880 Bateman had earned enough from the business to buy Salem House, a Georgian building some 200 yards from the original brewery, and a new brewery was built in its coach houses. In addition to the brewing, Bateman bottled spirits, and his wife baked bread for sale.

"On Fair Day, which was held twice a year, the farmers would come to Salem House to pay for the beer their workers had consumed the previous six months. It was very common for this payment to not be paid in cash, but with meat and potatoes. Once payment had been made, we would invite the farmers into our kitchen for a massive feast. This tradition continued until 1930."

By 1910 the company was engaged in the bottling of Guinness and Bass for its estate.

Bateman's son, Harry, went into the business, which he bought from his father in 1919. The 1920s and 1930s proved to be a very lean time for the industry, partly because of severe restrictions on brewing that had come in during World War I, partly because of higher taxes, and a consequent decrease in sales. At one point Bateman had to lay off his entire workforce, but their resulting plight made him take them back; in order to find work for them, he expanded the business into building opposite Salem House — including a derelict windmill which was to become the brewery's trademark.

By 1948 the tied estate had grown to 68 pubs.

Mild ale was the principal product during the 1950s.

From 1970 until 1992 the brewery ran a line for the production of keg beers.

The company's XXXB beer was introduced on 1 February 1978.

During the 1980s the company faced a difficult decision: half of the family wanted to sell up and half wanted to continue brewing. Chairman George Bateman, his wife Pat and their children Stuart and Jaclyn saved up enough money to buy out the family members who wanted to sell, and the company lived on.

== The pub business ==
On his twenty-first birthday, Harry Bateman had been given a pub by his father; in the 1920s he began to expand upon that beginning, and bought a group of pubs generally thought to be worthless. This chain was expanded in 1927 by the purchase of the Vine Hotel in Skegness, and in 1935 by the building of the County Hotel in the same town. In 1957, when Batemans already owned a chain of seventy pubs, they bought another twenty-nine, mostly run-down pubs to the north of Boston, as well as some in the town itself. It took eight years to renovate and obtain licences for them (at the time, a pub could not have a licence unless it had at least two rooms).

Batemans beers are now available from pubs throughout the UK, but especially within Lincolnshire and neighbouring counties.

== Batemans beers ==
=== Cask ===
Batemans produces three regular cask conditioned beers:

- Gold
- XB
- XXXB - First brewed by Ken Dixon on 1 February 1978

=== Bottled ===
- Combined Harvest (ABV = 4.7%)
- Dark Lord (ABV = 4.7%)
- Triple XB (XXXB) (ABV = 4.8%)
- Victory Ale (ABV = 6.0%)
- Mocha (ABV = 6.0%) Winner of the Sainsbury's Great British Beer Hunt 2012: "A fresh coffee and chocolate experience brewed with genuine arabica coffee, fine Belgian chocolate and locally grown roasted malt"

== Product information ==
The labels on Triple XB, Victory and Dark Lord state they are approved by the Vegan Society.

Bateman's also produces a hard green ginger wine for British supermarket Aldi.
