= Daleside Brewery =

Brewery in Harrogate, England

Coordinates: 53°59′59.4″N 1°30′04.2″W

- Founded: 1988; 38 years ago
- Founder: Bill Witty
- Headquarters: Harrogate, Yorkshire, England
- Key people: Craig Witty; (Head Brewer); Eric Lucas; (Managing Director)
- Owner: Independent; (1988–2024); Rooster's Brewing Co; (2024–present)
- Website: www.dalesidebrewery.com

Daleside Brewery is an independent brewery founded in 1988 by Bill Witty. Its headquarters are located in Harrogate, North Yorkshire, England.

In March 2024, it was reported that the company had been acquired by Rooster's Brewery.

== History ==
Three years after his father founded the company, Craig Witty became head brewer in 1991. When Billy died in 2007, his son took over running Daleside Brewery and continues to be a driving force behind the popular English microbrewery.

Established in Harrogate, the firm moved to Starbeck in 1992 and went through periods of enlargement up until 1999. It has won numerous awards for its ales, including its Morocco Ale.

=== Morocco Ale ===
The 17th-century recipe for this ale, which had been brewed especially for Charles II of England and named after his wife, Catherine of Braganza, who was described as being Moorish, was rediscovered in the early 1990s after being lost and was given to Daleside under special licence. Morocco Ale is specially brewed for Levens Hall in Cumbria, who are the owners of the secret recipe.

== Products ==
Daleside produce a wide range of beers including;

- Morocco Ale, a traditional spiced beer based on an Elizabethan recipe
- Old Legover, a low abv Old Ale
- Monkey Wrench, a stronger Old Ale (CAMRA award-winning) which was brewed especially for a beer festival in Hartlepool (so named after the colloquial nickname for people from Hartlepool who are known as Monkey hangers)
- Ripon Jewel, a strong pale ale, commissioned by Ripon Cathedral in honour of a gemstone associated with the founding of the cathedral. Brewed since 1999; a percentage of the profits go to the cathedral's maintenance fund.
- Chocolate Stout, a stout where the barley is heavily roasted and Nestlé chocolate is added
- Duff, a 5% abv dark ale ('Duff' sounds like 'dubh' Gaelic for "Dark")
- Crack Shot Ale, named in honour of Jane Ingilby who supposedly dressed as a man and fought at the Battle of Marston Moor, later standing guard over Oliver Cromwell when he hid in Ripley Castle overnight after the battle
- EU in, a golden fruity ale
- EU out, a light hoppy ale (both of these were brewed in spring 2016 during the EU Referendum campaign in the United Kingdom)
- Greengrass, named after the curmudgeonly character Claude Jeremiah Greengrass from the TV show Heartbeat

== Sponsorship ==
Daleside Brewery sponsor the annual Auld Lang Syne 6-mile (9.7 km) fell race in Haworth every New Year's Eve.
