= Kelham Island Brewery =

Brewery in Sheffield, England

Coordinates: 53.3886°N 1.4718°W

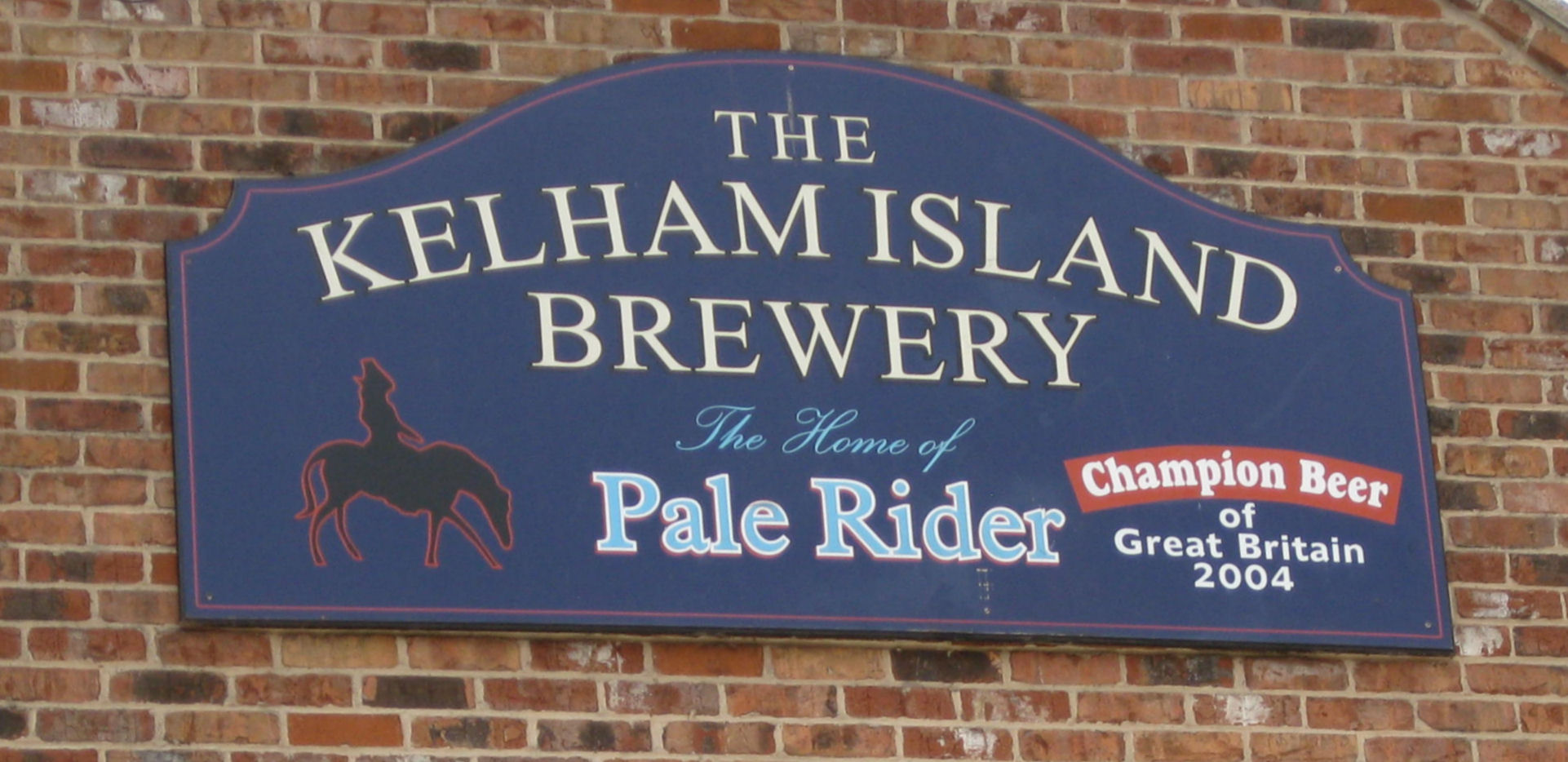
Sign on the Building

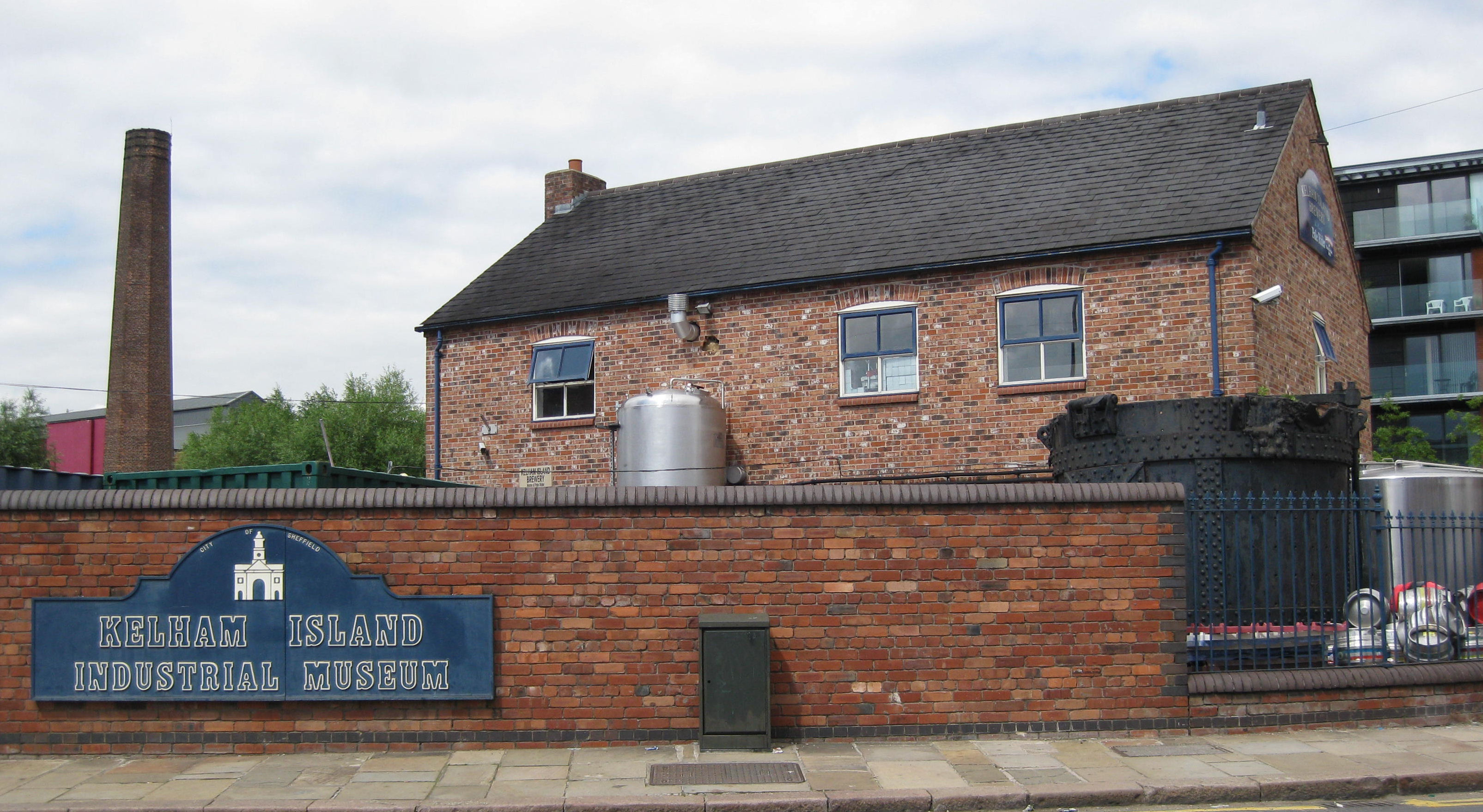
Brewery Building

The Kelham Island Brewery was a small independent brewery based in the Kelham Island Quarter area of Sheffield, South Yorkshire, England. It closed down in May 2022.

However, the brewery was saved from closure in September 2022 by a group led by the co-founder of the city's Tramlines festival, James O'Hara, who was joined by his brother, financial analyst Tom, Simon Webster and Jim Harrison from Thornbridge Brewery, creative agency founder Peter Donohoe and Ben Rymer from beer festival organiser We Are Beer.

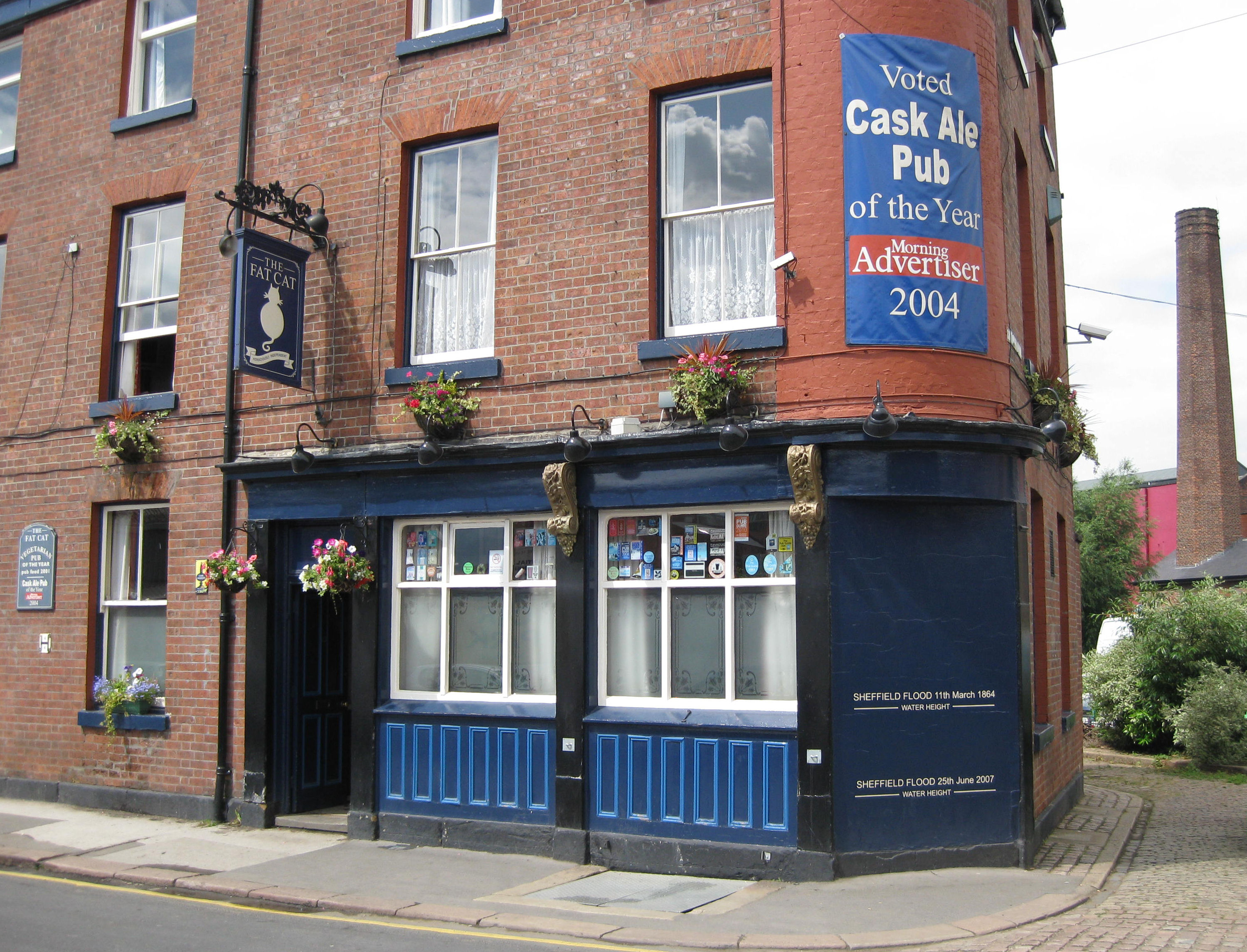
Fat Cat public house

In 1990 the brewery was opened (the first for 100 years to open in Sheffield) on purpose-built premises on Alma Street by the owner of the Fat Cat public house, Dave Wickett. As well as the Fat Cat, the brewery owns a British-styled pub in Rochester, New York (United States), named the Old Toad.

Its beer Pale Rider won the "Champion Beer of Britain" award at the 2004 Campaign for Real Ale (CAMRA) organised Great British Beer Festival.

The brewery is situated next to the Kelham Island Industrial Museum.

== See also ==
- List of breweries in England
