= Oakham Ales =

English brewery

Oakham Ales is an English brewery now based in Peterborough, Cambridgeshire, but first established in 1993 in Oakham, Rutland. The original owner, John Wood, left Oakham Ales in 1995.

Its headquarters is the largest brewpub in Europe, The Brewery Tap, which opened in 1998 and is located in the old labour exchange in Westgate, Peterborough. The brewery also owns The Bartons Arms in Aston, Birmingham.

Among awards the beers won have been JHB 3.8% picking up the Supreme Champion Beer Award in 2001 and Attila 7.4% was the National Winter Beers Champion for 2009. Green Devil IPA was the Champion Cask Conditioned Ale at the International Brewing Awards in 2015.

Mark Tetlow was appointed as head brewer in 2022 following the retirement of John Bryan, after 27 years with the company.
