= Elgood's Brewery =

Family-owned regional brewery in Wisbech, Cambridgeshire, England

Coordinates: 52.6610°N 0.1505°E

Elgood's
- Industry: Brewing
- Founded: 1795
- Headquarters: Wisbech, Cambridgeshire, England
- Products: Beer
- Owner: Elgood family
- Website: http://www.elgoods-brewery.co.uk

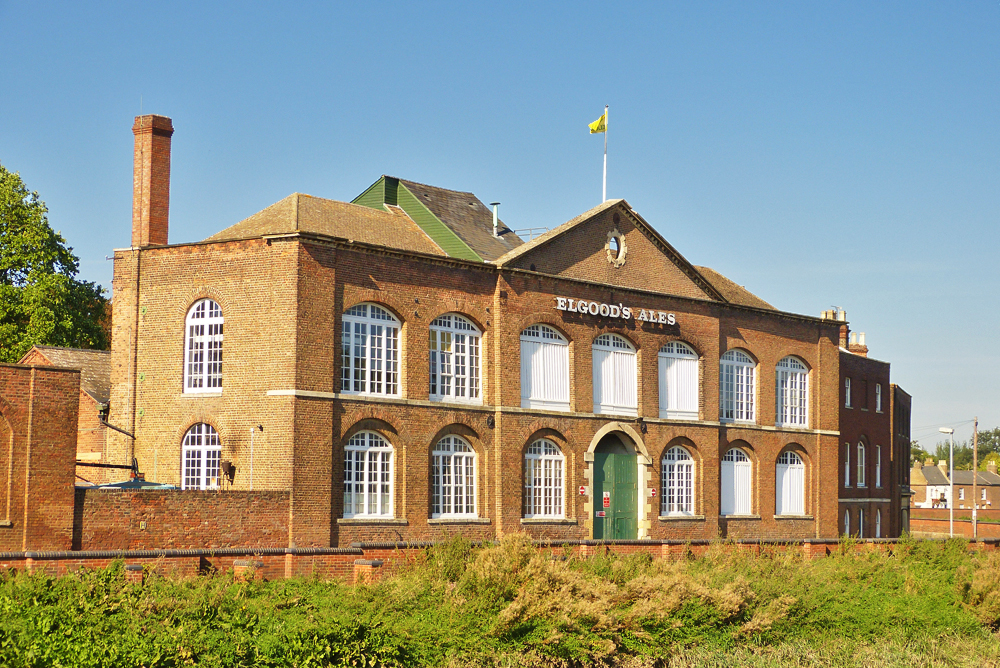
Elgood's Brewery in Wisbech

Elgood's is a family-owned regional brewery in Wisbech, Cambridgeshire, England, which was established in 1795.

== History ==
The North Brink Brewery, on the north bank of the River Nene in Wisbech, was established in 1795 and purchased six years later by William Watson and Abraham Usill. Both owners recognised the importance of acquiring public houses that would sell the produce of the brewery instead of brewing their own and eventually raised the number of tied houses to forty. Watson died in 1836, Phillips, Tibbitts and Phillips took over the brewery.

The partnership failed and the business was put up for auction in 1853.

THE "WISBECH BREWERY". Messrs. Bristow and son. Are instructed to SELL BY AUCTION, at the White Hart Hotel, Wisbech, Cambridgeshire. On Thursday 30th June next, and Following Day, In about 90 Lots. Upon on the Dissolution of the late Firm of Messrs. Phillips, Tidbits, and Phillips which has carried on a prosperous trade for many years), the whole of the valuable and extensive Estates and Property of the WISBECH BREWERY, CONSISTING of the commanding Freehold Brewery Premises, situate the Bank of the River Nene, together with 70 Hotels, Inns, & Public houses. Of which 49 or thereabouts, are Freehold, and the rest of Copyhold tenure equal to Freehold, and diverse valuable parcels of FREEHOLD BUILDING and ACCOMMODATION LAND, in and near Wisbech. Twenty of the Hotels and Public-houses are situate in the Town of Wisbech, and the others in the neighbouring Towns and Villages of Wisbech St. Mary's, Guyhern, Murrow. Leverington, Gorefield Green, Newton, Sutton St. Edmond's, Holbeach, Walsoken, West Walton, Walpole, Wiggenball St. German's, Clenchwarton, Elm, Friday Bridge, Outwell, Walton, Sutton St.James, Tidd St. Mary's, Sutton Wash, West Lynn, March, Tholamas Drove, Wimblington, Elmneth, Tidd St. Giles', Manea, Terrington St..Clements, Terrington St.John's and other places in the Counties of Cambridge, Lincoln, and Norfolk, all within a circle of a few miles round the Brewery. The Property affords an admirable opening for an enterprising Capitalist, to continue upon adequate scale, a most lucrative Brewing Business, or add to any business already established in those counties. The Town of Wisbech contains, according to the last census, upwards of 10,000 inhabitants for whose accommodation there is but a limited number licensed Inns and Public-houses, twenty of which form part of this property, while, in consequences of the operation of the statute restricting the Sale of Beer to houses rated to the poor at £15 and upwards in towns of this size, there will not only be no increase, but must shortly be a diminution in the number of beer-shops in Wisbech. Adjoining the Brewery is a capital Family Residence: for the Manager, including Gardens and Pleasure Grounds, with suitable Residences for clerksand others. The Brewery itself is a noble edifice, and together with all the houses, is perfect and substantial repair, the Proprietors having annually expended large sums of money for that purpose. The Town Houses and a large proportion of the Country Houses lie contiguous to the important engineering works now proceeding, and in contemplation, connected with the Nene Improvement Drainage Act.The Property may be viewed by permission of the tenants, and particulars obtained of Richard Tibbitts Esq, oundle. Norwich Mercury

Phillips continued until 1877 when the business was auctioned.

The brewery, property of Mr. G. F. Phillips, with the public, houses and other property, and ninety acres land, situated in Wisbech and the district, was offered by public auction on Monday at the Mart, Tokenhouse-yard. The first bid was £30000 and advanced by £1000 bids till it reached £49000. The last bid was £49,500. and the reserve being £60,000 the property was not sold. Cambridge Independent Press

In 1878, it came under the control of the Elgood family.

In 1882 two pubs were advertised to be let

ELGOOD and HARRISON, Wisbech, will have Two fully-licensed PUBLIC HOUSES to LET, at Michaelmas.— Apply at the North Brink Brewery, Wisbech. Stamford Mercury

In 1886 George Harrison, the junior partner to John Elgood was reported in financial difficulties.

Bankruptcy of Mr. George Harrison.— Mr. George Harrison, the well-known corn-merchant and brewer, had a petition in bankruptcy filed against him on Saturday, the petitioning creditors being Messrs. E. Vergette, senr., W. D. Nichols, and S. Stanley. He is junior partner in the firm of Elgood and Harrison, brewers, Peterboro', but the petition only affects his private estate. Mr. Harrison left Peterboro' about ten days ago, and his whereabouts is not known. The High Bailiff of Peterboro' has taken possession of his private residence, and the offices and warehouses at Peterboro'. The news of the failure excited general surprise. Mr. Harrison was a member the Town Council, president of the Peterboro' Licensed Victuallers' Association, Lieutenant in the 1st Northamptonshire Engineer Volunteer corps, president of several athletic clubs, and held many other public positions. He is a bachelor. Stamford Mercury

After it was bought by the Elgood family, the building was renovated in the Georgian style and most of it is still in use today. It was one of the first classic Georgian breweries outside London. Nigel and Anne Elgood's three daughters, Belinda Sutton, Jennifer Everall and Claire Simpson, are the fifth generation of the family to run the business.

In the First World War, the brewery was fire-bombed by a Zeppelin, and the shell of the bomb can still be viewed in the brewery museum. In the Second World War, some of the metal vats and tuns were melted down, but the brewery retained its 17th-century Eagle Foundry (Wisbech) liquor vat.

The brewery was listed as Grade II in 1983. In the brewery gardens there is a landscaped mound, on top of which stands Brewery House. This mound is the outside of the original cold store for the beer. In the First and Second World Wars the cellar doubled as an air-raid shelter. Today the cellar is unused, but the entrance is still visible from the current cold store. The gardens, which contain 200-year-old trees, a lake and a maze, are promoted by the Campaign to Protect Rural England.

Redundancy notices were issued in October 2020 as the family-owned company struggled to keep its head above water during the Covid19 pandemic .

== Beers ==
- Apple & Vanilla wheat beer
- Blackberry Porter
- Black Dog - 2006 CAMRA Silver Award for mild
- Cambridge - 2006 CAMRA Gold Award for bitter
- Cambridge IPA Dark
- Cherry wheat beer
- Coolship Fruit
- Coolship mango
- Coolship Sour ale
- Greyhound
- Golden Newt
- Pageant
- FeElgood
- The FeElgood Factor - chocolate flavoured, no longer in production
- Indian Summer
- Plum Porter
- Warrior bitter
- Wenceslas Winter Warmer
- Double Swan - proceeds from Double Swan are donated to the Wildfowl & Wetlands Trust (WWT) reserve in Welney
- Windsor Knot - a special brew run to celebrate the royal wedding of Prince William and Catherine Middleton

Elgood Flag Porter is based on a traditional 19th century British recipe using yeast that was salvaged from containers or barrels in a ship that sank in the English Channel in 1825. In 1988, several bottles of the brew were obtained from the sunken ship in the Channel. They were still in their original containers, with their wood stoppers and wax seals intact. When opened, the beer were said to taste like wet boots according to brewer and microbiologist, Dr Keith Thomas. Upon examining the beer under a microscope, he found a small percentage of the yeast was still alive. He spent months growing this yeast and brewed a porter using an 1850 recipe.
