= Triple fff Brewery =

Hampshire brewery of award-winning ales and lager

Triple fff Brewery has been brewing award winning beer since 1997. Based in Four Marks, Triple fff is Hampshire's oldest independent standalone brewery. They produce a range of ales including bitters, pales and stouts, as well as a pilsner. Their well-known beers include Alton's Pride (World Beer Awards Winner Best Bitter (under 4.5%), 2025), Moondance (Champion Bitter of Britain, 2002), Pressed Rat and Warthog, and many more. Triple fff Brewery currently has seven popular all year brews, several rotating seasonal brews, and new flavourful creations each year.

Since 1997, Triple fff have won over 80 awards for their beers. Attending SIBA (Society of Independent Brewers) and CAMRA (Campaign for Real Ale) beer festivals around the country, they have won reputable awards at both the regional and national level. Their beers have won awards in a range of categories, including best bitter, best pale ale, and fastest selling beer.

Triple fff Brewery's tap room, Off The Rails, serves their beer fresh from the brewery every day. Similarly, their on-site shop sells bottles, cans and boxes of beer as well as a range of Triple fff merchandise. Triple fff beer is served around the country and is regularly found in around 300 pubs, restaurants, hotels and clubs in Hampshire, Surrey, Bucks, Wiltshire, West Sussex, Dorset, Oxfordshire and London.

== History ==
Graham Trott and Frank Norris launched Triple fff in September 1997. They installed a five barrel plant in one of the units vacated by the Magpie Furniture factory on Station Approach, in Four Marks. Graham, a keen home brewer, was a Cabinet Maker by trade who started his career at Magpie Furniture. Once the company closed down, he saw this as an opportunity to turn his hobby of brewing into a profession.

Graham and Frank took a musical theme for their brewery. Naming it Triple fff which stands for fortississimo and means "very very loud". Frank's share of the business was bought out after a few years by Graham.

In 1998, just one year after founding, Triple fff beers won their first 11 awards (for Moondance, Dazed and Confused, and Comfortably Numb). In 2000, with eight more awards under their belt, Triple fff expanded the brewery into an 18 barrel plant. Moondance went on to win Bronze in the Champion Beer of Britain category at the CAMRA Great British Beer Festival, in 2002. Facing a growing love for their beer, Triple fff expanded again in 2006, becoming a 50 barrel system and brewing over 31,000 pints a week. In 2006, they also opened their onsite shop. At the Great British Beer Festival in 2008, Alton's Pride then won Gold in the Champion Bitter of Britain and Supreme Champion Beer of Britain categories, an amazing feat. In November 2017, the brewery launched their onsite taproom, Offf The Rails, serving beers fresh from the brewery.

In 2023, Xen Gladstone came onboard in partnership with Graham, turning Triple fff into Triple fff Brewery Ltd. Xen brought a fresh business perspective. 2023 saw the commission of a brand new five barrel plant and the creation of Sundown. Sundown was a seasonal brew ("Coronation") for King Charles' Coronation, but it sold out 3 weeks early and so relaunched as a regular brew ("Sundown"). Most recently, their Alton's Pride was awarded England's best bitter in the 2025 World Beer awards.

== Beers ==
The brewery produces real ale and lager. Graham has created recipes for Triple fff for over 25 years. The beer names originally came from song titles of 1960's rock icons. As new beers have been created, the new names have gone on to form a mix of many genres over many years, and this continues to grow.

Their all year beers include:

- Moondance (4.2%) - one of their original beers, a pale ale.
- Alton's Pride (3.8%) - Supreme Champion Beer of Britain (2008), a golden brown session bitter.
- Pressed Rat and Warthog (3.8%) - a deep ruby colour, dark mild ale.
- Sundown (4.3%) - a golden IPA, previously "Coronation".
- Jagged Little Pilsner (5.0%) - a Bohemian Pilsner with a subtle carbonation.
- Satisfaction (3.4%) - a golden session ale, their lower alcohol option.
- Black Velvet (4.2%) - an oatmeal stout, previously "Snow Blind".

Some seasonal brews include:

- Comfortably Numb (5.0%) - a deep amber colour, seasonally spiced strong ale.
- Lady Eleanor (4.6%) - a fruity pale ale.
- Dazed and Confused (4.6%) - a pale amber ale.
- Swing Low (4.1%) - a light, hoppy pale ale, created in summer 2025 to support The Red Roses rugby players.
- Little Red Rooster (5.7%) - a smooth ruby red ale.
- Fool's Gold (5.4%) - a golden ale brewed with all British ingredients.
- Old Dray (4.8%) - a true original English ale.
- We'll Meet Again (3.8%) - a refreshing pale ale, with a pump clip designed to commemorate those who have served. Lest we forget.
- Nothing Else Matters (4.7%) - a single-hopped pale ale using Polish Magnum.

== Awards ==
Alton's Pride
Year	Award	Result
2025	World Beer Awards World's Best Bitter (under 4.5%)	Gold
2025	World Beer Awards UK's Best Bitter	Gold
2025	SIBA Best Bottled British Ale (under 6.4%)	Gold
2024	SIBA South East and London: Cask British Bitter	Gold
2015	CAMRA South East and London: Bitter Category	Gold
2013	CAMRA Doncaster Beer Festival: Bitter of the Festival	Gold
2011	CAMRA Great British Beer Festival: Champion Bitter of Britain	Bronze
2011	SIBA South East Standard Bitter	Silver
2010	Alton Winter Beer Festival	Silver
2009	CAMRA Great British Beer Festival: Champion Bitter of Britain	Bronze
2008	CAMRA Great British Beer Festival: Supreme Champion Beer of Britain	Gold
2008	CAMRA Great British Beer Festival: Champion Bitter of Britain	Gold
2006	CAMRA Woking Beer Festival: Bitter of the Festival	Gold
2004	CAMRA Great British Beer Festival: Champion Bitter of Britain Bronze	Bronze
2003	CAMRA Great British Beer Festival: Champion Bitter of Britain	Bronze
2003	CAMRA Woking Beer Festival: Bitter of the Festival	Gold
2003	SIBA South East Standard Bitter	Silver
2002	SIBA South East	Silver
2001	SIBA South East Champion Bitter	Gold

Moondance
Year	Award	Result
2022	SIBA South East: Cask Session Pale Ale Bronze	Bronze
2014	CAMRA Southampton Beer Festival	Silver
2014	CAMRA Hampshire Beer of the Year	Silver
2012	SIBA South East Overall Campion	Bronze
2012	SIBA South East Best Bitter	Gold
2010	SIBA National Best Bitter	Bronze
2010	SIBA South East Best Bitter	Silver
2009	SIBA National Best Bitter	Silver
2009	CAMRA Cotswold Overall Champion	Gold
2009	CAMRA Cotswold Overall Winner	Gold
2008	Alton Beer Festival	Silver
2007	Alton Beer Festival	Gold
2006	Reading Local Beer (Bitter 4-4.4%) of the Festival	Gold
2006	CAMRA Great British Beer Festival: Supreme Champion Beer of Britain	Bronze
2006	CAMRA Great British Beer Festival: Champion Best Bitter of Britain	Silver
2004	SIBA National	Bronze
2003	SIBA South East	Gold
2003	CAMRA Bristol Overall Winner	Gold
2002	CAMRA Great British Beer Festival: Champion Bitter of Britain	Gold
2001	SIBA South East	Gold
1999	CAMRA Poole Festival Overall	Silver
1999	CAMRA Southampton Pale Ale	Gold
1999	CAMRA Hampshire Beer of the Year	Gold
1998	CAMRA Southampton Beer of the Festival	Gold
1998	CAMRA Southampton Overall	Gold
1998	CAMRA Hampshire	Silver
1998	CAMRA Hampshire Beer of the Year	Silver
1998	Farnham Beer-ex Beer of the Festival	Gold

Pressed Rat and Warthog
Year	Award	Result
2024	SIBA South East and London Dark Session Beers	Bronze
2024	SIBA National Independent Beer Awards: Cask Dark Session Beer	Bronze
2023	CAMRA South East and London Regional Champion Beer of Britain Mild Category	Gold
2023	SIBA South East and London Dark Session Beers	Gold
2022	SIBA South East	Bronze
2022	CAMRA Octoberfest North Hampshire	Highly commended
2015	CAMRA Reading	Gold
2015	CAMRA South East and London Mild Category	Gold
2014	CAMRA Woking Mild of the Festival	Gold
2012	SIBA South East Mild Category	Silver
2012	CAMRA South East and London Mild Category	Silver
2011	CAMRA South East and London Mild Category	Gold
2010	CAMRA Woking Mild of the Festival	Gold
2006	CAMRA Reading Local Beer of the Festival	Gold
2006	CAMRA Reading Overall Champion	Gold
2003	CAMRA Aylesbury	Gold
2003	CAMRA Macclesfield	Silver
2002	CAMRA Woking Mild of the Festival	Gold
2002	CAMRA Great British Beer Festival Champion Mild of Britain	Gold

Comfortably Numb
Year	Award	Result
2010	Alton Winter Beer Festival: Beer of the Festival	Gold
2009	Alton Winter Beer Festival: Beer of the Festival	Gold
2005	CAMRA White Cliffs Overall Champion	Gold
2002	CAMRA Macclesfield Best Strong Bitter	Bronze
2000	CAMRA White Cliffs Overall Champion	Gold
1998	CAMRA North Hants Overton Winner	Gold
1998	CAMRA Overton Beer of the Festival	Gold

Dazed and Confused
Year	Award	Result
2005	CAMRA Halifax and Calderdale	Silver
2005	CAMRA Halifax Beer of the Festival	Silver
2004	SIBA South East Premium Bitter	Silver
2000	CAMRA Norwich Best Bitter of the Festival	Gold
1999	CAMRA Overton 4.5% and Above	Silver
1999	CAMRA Southampton Hampshire Beer of the Year	Gold
1998	CAMRA Portsmouth Premium Bitter	Gold
1998	CAMRA Woking Best Bitter	Gold
1998	CAMRA Harbury (Warks) Beer of the Festival	Bronze
1998	CAMRA Harbury (Warks) Fastest Selling Beer	Gold

Sundown
Year	Award	Result
2023	Alton Beer Festival (as "Coronation")	Silver
