= Renegade Brewery =

Brewery in Yattendon, Berkshire, England

Coordinates: 51°28′2″N 1°12′17″W

- Industry: Brewing
- Founded: 1995
- Founders: Dave and Helen Maggs
- Headquarters: Yattendon, Berkshire, England
- Products: Beer
- Parent: Yattendon Group
- Website: renegadebrewery.co.uk

Renegade Brewery is a brewery in Yattendon, Berkshire, England. Founded in 1995 as the West Berkshire Brewery by husband and wife Dave and Helen Maggs, the brewery began in a brickworks shed in Frilsham. The company has received a number of SIBA and CAMRA local beer festival awards.

Having entered administration in 2021, the brewery was acquired by the Yattendon Group and was renamed the Renegade Brewery.

== History ==
West Berkshire Brewery was founded in the summer of 1995 in a dilapidated building behind the Pot Kiln in Frilsham. Within the first year of operations, the brewery won their first award.

By 2000, the business had outgrown the original site and so opened a second unit in Yattendon, thus increasing capacity to 25 barrels per week. Further growth meant that in 2006 more fermenters were installed, increasing capacity to 80 barrels per week.

In 2005, the brewery acquired their first pub, the Rising Sun at Stockcross. In 2007, the pub won West Berkshire CAMRA's pub of the year award. The same year, the Frilsham plant ceased operations, and the brewery operated solely from Yattendon.

In 2013, the brewery appointed David Bruce, founder of the Firkin pub chain, as director. and is chairman of the company. In 2017, the brewery opened a purpose-built facility with shop, bar, and restaurant.
