= Titanic Brewery =

Independent producer of ales in Burslem, Stoke-on-Trent, England

- Company type: Private
- Industry: Brewery
- Founded: 1985
- Founder: Keith Bott, David Bott
- Headquarters: Burslem, Stoke-on-Trent, England
- Key people: Keith Bott MBE (Director) & Dave Bott (Director)
- Products: Beer, Gin
- Website: www.titanicbrewery.co.uk

The Titanic Brewery is an independent producer of bottle conditioned and cask ales in Burslem, Stoke-on-Trent, England.

Titanic's beers are generally notable for their light colour, low malt, and high hop content, giving a very dry bitter taste, although Captain Smith's and some of their seasonal beers are dark and malty, though still extremely hoppy. Their seasonal ranges also include lighter and fruity ales such as 2019 seasonal beer, Kiwi Fleet, which is made with New Zealand hops.

== History ==
The brewery was founded in Burslem, Stoke-on-Trent, in 1985 by John Pazio, and is now run by brothers Keith and Dave Bott, and takes its name from the ill-fated steam liner Titanic. It is in honour of its captain Edward Smith (who came from Stoke-on-Trent) that the brewery is named.

One of the owners, Keith Bott, was formerly the chairman of SIBA, the Society of Independent Brewers.

== Products ==
Its 'Fleet' range of beers include:

- Plum Porter (4.9% abv)
- Titanic Mild (3.5% abv)
- Steerage (formerly Titanic Best Bitter) (3.8% abv)
- Anchor ABV (4.1% abv)
- Iceberg (4.1% abv)
- Titanic Stout (4.5% abv)
- White Star (4.5% abv)
- Captain Smith's Strong Ale (5.2% abv)

All of these, bar the Mild are available in bottles from the brewery, the brewery tap, and supermarkets. They produce over 4 million pints every year.

Titanic have also branched out into distilling their own gin.

== Pubs ==
Titanic Brewery presently runs nine pubs in North Staffordshire, Derbyshire and Oxfordshire: The Bull's Head in Burslem, The Greyhound in Newcastle-under-Lyme, The Roebuck in Leek, The Royal Exchange in Stone, The Sun Inn in Stafford, The Cheshire Cheese in Buxton, The Royal Blenheim in Oxford, Old Poets Corner in Ashover and The Beacon in Lichfield.

== Café bars ==
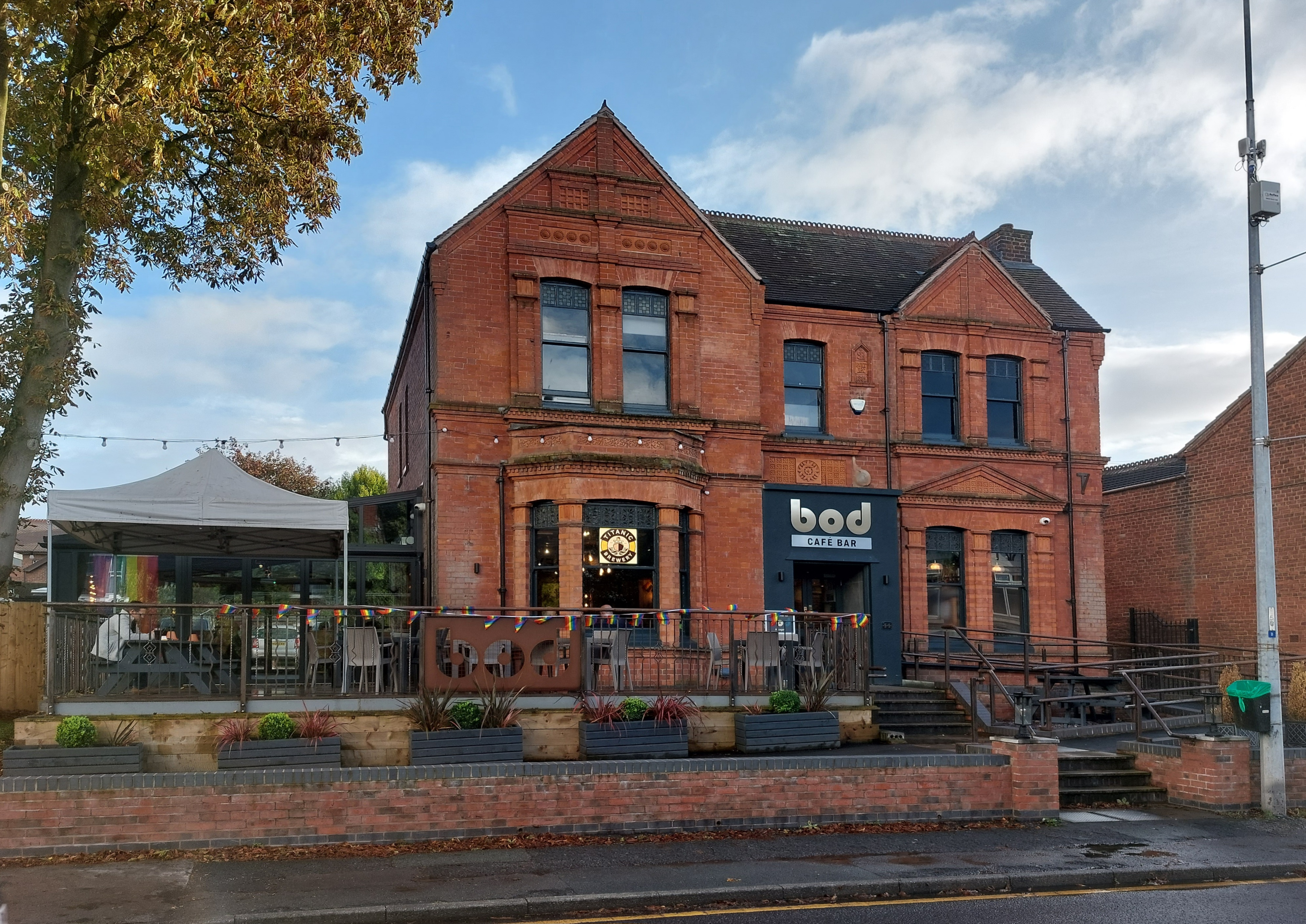
bod Alsager in September 2023

Titanic Brewery also runs eight 'Bod' café bars in the Staffordshire area: in Alsager, Lichfield, Matlock, Newport, Stafford, Stoke-on-Trent railway station, Stone and Trentham.

== Awards ==
The Titanic Brewery has won many awards, including some from CAMRA (the Campaign for Real Ale), from the 1990s to the present day.

The Titanic Brewery's bottled Stout beer's first award was Gold in the 1994 Guardian Bottled Beer of Britain, and more recently it won first place in the CAMRA West Midlands Beer of the Year 2009 (Stout Category). Titanic's Iceberg Beer won its first award in 2002, achieving Gold in the CAMRA Champion Beer of the West Midlands category, and again more recently achieved first place in the CAMRA West Midlands Beer of the Year (Speciality Category).
