= Castle Rock Brewery =

English brewery and pub group

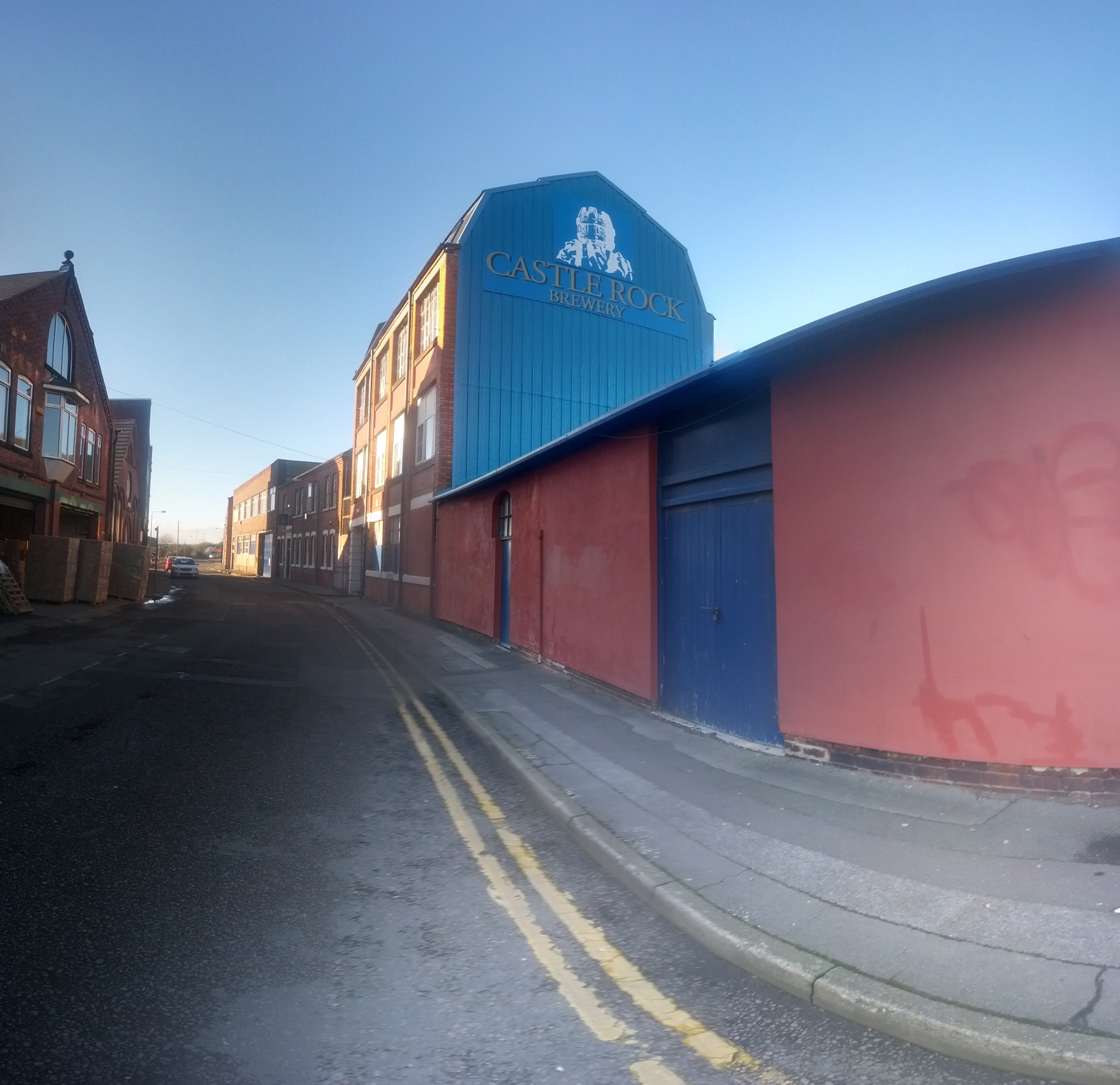
A panoramic image of the brewery frontage

Castle Rock Brewery is a brewery and pub group based in Nottingham, Nottinghamshire. Due to expiration of lease on its Traffic Street premises, in September 2026 the business announced an intended 2027 move from the city centre to premises in Basford suburb.

== History ==
It was originally set up as a joint venture with Bramcote Brewery. Bramcote Brewery was wound up and a new company was set up, 50% owned by Tynemill and 50% owned by the previous owners of Bramcote Brewery, on a new site next to Tynemill’s pub, The Vat and Fiddle, located on Queensbridge road close to Nottingham railway station. The Vat and Fiddle became the ‘Brewery Tap’, serving over 10 real ales at any one time, several of which are Castle Rock's.

Following slow beginnings Castle Rock Brewery grew steadily, and in 2001 Tynemill bought out the other shareholders and Castle Rock Brewery became a wholly owned subsidiary of Tynemill. A new head brewer was recruited – Pete Wooding, and the brewery was expanded with new equipment which led to the development of new brands. A few years later the head brewer was changed, and the brewery recruited Adrian Redgrove in 2004. After his appointment, the brewery went from strength to strength and began winning awards for various brews, largely brought about by Adrian Redgrove's skill and consistency.

Castle Rock Brewery had been brewing at capacity for over a year and the decision was made in 2009 to build a new brewery in adjoining property, giving Castle Rock Brewery a potential capacity of 300+ barrels per week. The brewery expansion came into place only shortly after one of Castle Rock's regular brews, Harvest Pale, won Supreme Champion Beer of Britain at the Great British Beer Festival. Production has grown over the years from 35 barrels per week in 2003, to 115–120 barrels per week in 2009–10, to 300+ barrels per week in their newly expanded brewery in 2010.

Castle Rock pubs have also been extremely successful, winning Pub Group of the Year accolade in 2002, 2006 and 2008. Castle Rock Brewery have 22 pubs across Nottinghamshire.

== Regular brews (as of 2015) ==
- Black Gold (dark mild), 3.8%
- Harvest Pale (pale ale), 3.8%
- Preservation (bitter), 4.4%
- Sherwood Reserve (stout), 4.5%
- Elsie Mo (pale ale), 4.7%
- Screech Owl (India pale ale), 5.5%
- Sheriff's Tipple (bitter), 3.4%
- Session IPA Session Craft Beer - Castle Rock's first permanent kegged beer.

Castle Rock also brew a range of one-offs and seasonal beers such as “Most Haunted”, a yearly Halloween special as well as four "Wildlife Reserve" beers a year, in conjunction with the Wildlife Trusts. They also brew a quarterly series of beers called the Nottinghamian Celebration Ales named after local legends and those who have made an impact on the wider Nottinghamshire area. The brewery also produces a range of one-off beers, named the "Traffic Street Specials" which focus on experimenting with flavours, ideas and the process of brewing itself.

The majority of Castle Rock beers are fined, which means they are not vegan friendly. However, the brewery normally produces one wheat beer a year which is unfined and naturally cloudy; suitable for vegans. The Traffic Street Specials (the spin-off series of experimental brews) are also unfined and vegan friendly.
