= Jarrow Brewing Company =

English brewery

- Type: Private
- Industry: Brewing
- Founded: 2002
- Defunct: 2015
- Fate: Compulsory Administration
- Headquarters: South Shields, UK
- Key people: Jess and Alison McConnell, Frank Nicholson
- Website: www.jarrowbrewery.co.uk

The Jarrow Brewing Company, or Jarrow Brewery, was an English brewery.

== History ==
The brewery was established at The Robin Hood Public House, Primrose, Jarrow in 2002 by owners Jess and Alison McConnell. The brewery at first supplied two pubs, The Robin Hood itself, and The Albion Inn, Bill Quay, also owned by Jess and Alison.

Trade picked up very quickly and soon a deal was struck up with beer distributor Flying Firkin to supply other pubs nationwide with the beer. Beers produced included "Jobling's Swinging Gibbett", a 4.1% copper coloured ale and "Old Cornelius", a dark strong ale at 4.8%, named after Cornelius Whalen, the last surviving Jarrow Marcher. Jess and Alison McConnell later opened the "Westoe Brewery" at "The Maltings" public house in South Shields. Brewing ceased at the Robin Hood in Summer 2008.

The brewery hit serious financial complications in 2015 and it was placed in to administration. A rescue company was formed by the breweries management, however it also fell in to administration just months later, with all pubs closing and brewery activities ceasing. Jarrow Brewing's equipment, trademarks and rights to the real ale names were bought by the Great North Eastern Brewing Company of Dunston.
