= Mighty Oak Brewery =

Brewery in Maldon, Essex, England

Mighty Oak Brewing Co Ltd is a small brewery located in the town of Maldon, Essex. It has won many awards from the Campaign for Real Ale (CAMRA).

Mighty Oak was founded by John Boyce in Brentwood in Essex in 1996. It moved to the town of Maldon in January 2001, and set up in the West Station Yard industrial area, once a major local industrial area with its own railway branch line to Witham.

The brewery makes mostly ale and exports these throughout Essex, London, Suffolk, Cambridgeshire, Hertfordshire and Kent. Many of the brewery's products are available to buy privately in different size plastic bladders up to keg size.

Boyce continues as managing director.

== Notable Ales ==
- Burntwood Bitter, a traditional best bitter with biscuit and coffee malt flavours, followed by a subtle fruity hop finish. A winner of many awards including Champion Beer of East Anglia 1999 and 2004 and Runner up in the Champion Beer of Great Britain Best Bitter Class 2005. Sadly no longer brewed!
- Maldon Gold, a blonde thirst-quenching brew, made with finest Maris Otter pale malt and Mount Hood and Cascade hops. Hoppy and fruity, and a winner of many awards, including CAMRA's Champion Golden Ale of Britain in 2007 when it was runner up in the Supreme Champion category.
- Cascade IPA, India Pale Ale style, 6.2% abv, with robust floral hops.
- Oscar Wilde, a dark mild, again a winner of numerous awards including Champion Beer of East Anglia 2005, Champion Mild of Great Britain 2006, Champion Mild of East Anglia 2010, and Supreme Champion Beer of Britain 2011 at CAMRA's Great British Beer Festival. It again won a CAMRA gold medal for East Anglia in 2023.
- Captain Bob, a deep amber bitter with a twist of New Zealand hops, named after the late Captain Bob Roberts who skippered the Thames Sailing Barge “Cambria". Another multiple winner, Captain Bob was awarded silver in the bitters class of the Champion Beer of Britain 2018 and then in 2023 was named the best bitter in East Anglia by CAMRA and nationally received the bronze award for third place in the Session Bitter category.

Besides these, the brewery makes several other ales and is committed to making several limited edition brews each month, as well as themed monthly specials - often with “amusing” names, such as Elfin Safety, Completely Conkers, Hobbit Forming and Yellow Snow. Mighty Oak has also developed a range of spirits and a liqueur.

== See also ==
- Maldon, Essex, the town that houses Mighty Oak.
- Campaign for Real Ale.
