= Moorhouse's Brewery =

Brewery based in Burnley, Lancashire, England

Coordinates: 53.7864°N 2.2696°W

Moorhouse's
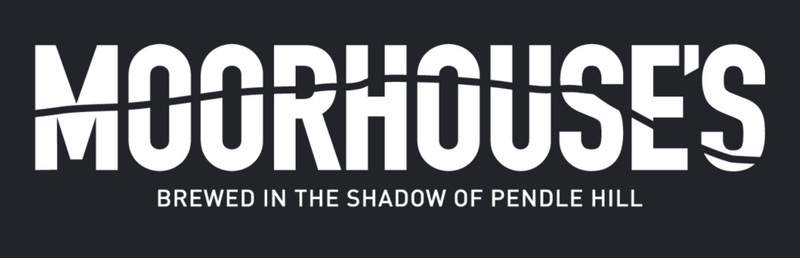

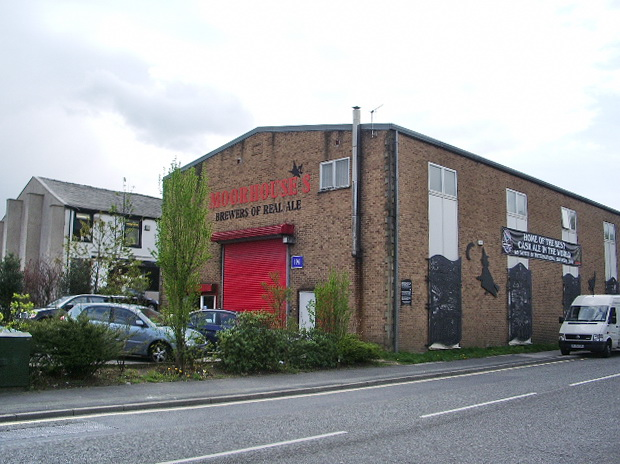
- Moorhouse's Brewery, Accrington Road, Burnley
- Company type: Private
- Industry: Brewing
- Founded: 1865
- Founder: William Moorhouse
- Headquarters: Burnley, Lancashire, England
- Products: Beer
- Website: moorhouses.co.uk

Moorhouse's is an independent brewery founded in 1865, by William Moorhouse in Burnley Lancashire, England, as a producer of mineral waters and low-alcohol beers known as hop bitters. It first produced cask ales in 1978.

== Products ==
The brewery produces cask ale and filtered beer in bottles.

== History ==
The business was founded in 1865 by William Moorhouse as a producer of mineral waters. The business was successful and by 1870 Moorhouse had a purpose-built building erected in Moorhouse Street off Accrington Road, Burnley which incorporated stables for the delivery horses and houses for the workers and Moorhouse family. William's sons took over the business and early in the 20th century began making low alcohol hop bitters which were exported throughout the world, notably United States and the Middle East.

In the 1930s the mineral water production was sold to Thwaites Brewery.

In 1978 Michael Ryan, a local builder, bought the premises and equipment from Tom Fawcett, the cousin of the last surviving Moorhouse family member, Ben Moorhouse. Ryan turned the soft drinks company into a cask ale brewery. The first cask ale produced was Premier Bitter.

The brewery struggled during its first four years, changing owners several times before being taken over in 1982 by Alan Hutchinson, a local hotel owner, who introduced the successful Pendle Witches Brew brand. After Hutchinson died in 1985 the brewing side of the business was about to be closed down when William Parkinson, a businessman who was born in Burnley, tried the last batch of Pendle Witches Brew and decided to buy the brewery, investing £500,000 in new equipment, a distribution depot, and buying six pubs.

Dan Casaru is the head brewer.

== Beers ==
=== Core beers ===
- White Witch 3.9%
- Blonde Witch 4.4%
- Pendle Witches Brew 5.1%
- Premier Bitter 3.7%
- Pride of Pendle 4.1%
- Ice Witch 4.3%
- Straw Dog 4.2%
- Black Cat Mild 3.4%
- Moonbeam Session IPA 4,3% (Silver award at the International Brewing Awards 2024)

=== Bespoke beers ===
- Broomstick Bitter 4.0%
- Witches Cauldron 4.2%
- Witchfinder General 4.4%

== Distribution ==
The cask ales are available in the company's 2 pubs, as guests in pubs, bars and restaurants throughout Britain and at British beer festivals. The British supermarkets Morrisons, Tesco, Booths, ALDI, Lidl, Spar and B&M bargains regularly stock the bottled beers.
