= Champion Winter Beer of Britain =

Annual award presented by CAMRA

The Champion Winter Beer of Britain is an award presented by the Campaign for Real Ale (CAMRA) at its annual Great British Beer Festival Winter. The award is similar to the Champion Beer of Britain which is presented at the Great British Beer Festival.

== Qualification and judging ==
As for Champion Beer of Britain, beers can qualify in three ways:

- CAMRA tasting panels judge the beers in their geographic area of the UK. The recommendations of these panels are put forward to 6 regional panels, with the winners of these qualifying for the finals in August.
- Votes from CAMRA members via a form in What's Brewing, the CAMRA newsletter.
- Winning one of the 150 Beer of the Festival awards from CAMRA beer festivals held throughout the year

Nominated beers are then grouped into categories and go through several rounds of blind tasting at the Great British Beer Festival Winter. Category winners are then re-judged to determine the supreme champion — the Champion Winter Beer of Britain.

== Categories ==
Beers are split into categories depending on their style or strength with Speciality ale categories joining in 2023 from the main Champion Beer of Britain competition.

- Old Ales & Strong Milds
- Barley Wines
- Session Porters and Stouts
- Strong Porters and Stouts
- Speciality Differently Produced Ales
- Speciality Flavoured Ales

== Results ==
There were two National Winter Ales Festivals in 1997. The first one at the beginning of the year presented the 1996/7 awards and the other, at the end of the year, presented the 1997/8 awards. There was no festival in 1998, the next one being in January 1999.

Key

- Blue background indicates beers that were named Supreme Champion after winning in their category.
- Green background indicates beers that were named Supreme Winter Beer but not Supreme Champion.

=== Supreme Winter Beer of Britain category ===
Year	Gold	Silver	Bronze
1996/7	Hambleton, Nightmare	Branscombe Vale, Yo Ho Ho	Theakston, Old Peculier
1997/8	Nethergate, Old Growler	Shepherd Neame, Original Porter	Daleside, Monkey Wrench (Yorkshire)
1999	Dent, T'Owd Top	Woodforde's, Norfolk Nog	Daleside, Monkey Wrench (Yorkshire)
2000	Robinson's, Old Tom (Stockport)	Theakstons, Old Peculier	Wye Valley, Dorothy Goodbody's Wholesome Stout
2001	Orkney, Skullsplitter	Sarah Hughes, Dark Ruby Mild	O'Hanlon's, Port Stout
2002	Wye Valley, Dorothy Goodbody's Wholesome Stout	Bath Ales, Festivity	Robinsons, Old Tom
2003	Nethergate, Old Growler	Gales, Festival Mild (London)	Wentworth, Oatmeal Stout
2004	Moor, Old Freddy Walker	Gales, Festival Mild (London)	Shepherd Neame, Original Porter
2005	Robinsons, Old Tom	Bath Ales, Festivity	Woodforde's, Headcracker
2006	Hogs Back, A Over T (Surrey)	Gales, Festival Mild (London)	Goff's, Black Knight
2007	Green Jack, Ripper	Fuller's, London Porter	Orkney, Skullsplitter
2008	Wickwar, Station Porter (Gloucestershire)	Robinson's, Old Tom	Hop Back, Entire Stout
2009	Oakham, Attila (Cambridgeshire)	Elland, 1872 Porter (West Yorkshire)	Sarah Hughes, Dark Ruby Mild
2010	Elland, 1872 Porter (West Yorkshire)	Breconshire, Ramblers Ruin	Acorn's, Gorlovka Imperial Stout
2011	Hop Back, Entire Stout	Marble, Chocolate	Dow Bridge, Praetorian Porter
2012	Driftwood, Alfie's Revenge (St Agnes, Cornwall)	Cairngorm, Black Gold (Aviemore, Highlands)	Coniston, No. 9 Barley Wine (Coniston, Cumbria)
2013	Elland Brewery, 1872 Porter (West Yorkshire)	Bartrams Brewery, Comrade Bill; Bartram's EAISS [Egalitarian; Anti-Imperialist Soviet Stout] (Suffolk)	Kelburn Brewing, Dark Moor (East Renfrewshire)
2014	Dunham Massey, Porter (Greater Manchester)	Cairngorm, Black Gold (Aviemore, Highlands)	Exe Valley, Winter Glow (Devon)
2015	Elland Brewery, 1872 Porter (West Yorkshire)	Purple Moose, Darkside of the Moose	Dancing Duck, Dark Drake
2016	Marble, Chocolate Marble	Elland, 1872 Porter (West Yorkshire)	Plain Ales, Inncognito Stout
2017	Moor, Old Freddy Walker	Sulwath Brewers, Black Galloway	Magic Rock, Dark Arts
2018	Green Jack, Ripper	Siren Craft, Broken Dream Breakfast Stout	Cairngorm, Black Gold
2019	Lacons, Audit Ale	Calverley's, Porter	Harviestoun, Old Engine Oil
2020	Competition cancelled due to COVID-19 pandemic
2021	Competition cancelled due to COVID-19 pandemic
2022	Competition cancelled due to COVID-19 pandemic
2023	Elland Brewery, 1872 Porter (West Yorkshire)	Robinsons Brewery, Old Tom (Cheshire)	Dancing Duck’s, Dark Drake (Derbyshire)
2024	Sarah Hughes, Snowflake	Elland, 1872 Porter; Muirhouse Brewery, Magnum Mild	n/a
2025	Cairngorm, Black Gold	Sarah Hughes, Snowflake	Grain, Slate
Source: Champion Winter Beer of Britain Results

=== Old Ale category ===
- 1991: Old Ales & Strong Milds
- 1994–1995: Old Ales & Strong Ales
- 1996-2020: Old Ales & Strong Milds
- 2023 onwards: Brown Ales, Red Ales, Old Ales and Strong Milds

Year	Gold	Silver	Bronze
1991	Theakston, Old Peculier	King & Barnes, Old	Sarah Hughes, Dark Ruby Mild
1992	Woodforde's, Norfolk Nog (Norfolk)	Theakston, Old Peculier	Young's, Winter Warmer
1993	Sarah Hughes, Original Mild	King & Barnes, Old Ale	n/a
1994	Hadrian, Emperor	Summerskill, Indiana Bones	Young's, Winter Warmer
1995	Theakston, Old Peculier	Orkney, Dark Island	King & Barnes, Old
1996	No event was held this year
1997	Branscombe, Vale Yo Ho Ho	Theakston, Old Peculier	n/a
1998	Daleside, Monkey Wrench (Yorkshire)	Sarah Hughes, Dark Ruby Mild; King & Barnes, Old Ale	Gales, Festival Mild (London)
1999	Daleside, Monkey Wrench (Yorkshire)	n/a	n/a
2000	Theakston, Old Peculier	Gales, Festival Mild (London)	n/a
2001	Sarah Hughes, Dark Ruby Mild	Orkney, Dark Island	n/a
2002	Bath Ales, Festivity	Rudgate, Ruby Mild	Beartown, Black Bear
2003	Gales, Festival Mild (London)	Sarah Hughes, Dark Ruby Mild	Woodforde's, Norfolk Nog
2004	Gales, Festival Mild (London)	n/a	n/a
2005	Bath Ales, Festivity	Gales, Festival Mild (London)	Theakston, Old Peculier
2006	Gales, Festival Mild (London)	Goff's, Black Knight	Orkney, Dark Island
2007	B&T, Black Dragon Mild	Orkney, Dark Island	Rudgate, Ruby Mild
2008	Purple Moose, Dark Side of the Moose	West Berkshire, Maggs Magnificent Mild	Highland, Dark Monroe
2009	Sarah Hughes, Dark Ruby	Bryncelyn, Buddy Marvellous	Orkney, Dark Island; Theakston, Old Peculier
2010	Breconshire, Ramblers Ruin	Leeds, Midnight Bell	Beartown, Black Bear
2011	Marble, Chocolate	King's, Old Ale	Beowulf's, Dark Raven
2012	Driftwood, Alfie's Revenge (Cornwall)	Nant, Mwnci Nell (Conwy); Brunswick, Black Sabbath (Derbyshire)	Beowulf, Dark Raven (Staffordshire)
2013	Kelburn Brewing, Dark Moor (East Renfrewshire)	Jennings, Sneck Lifter (Cumbria)	Purple Moose, Dark Side of the Moose (Gwynedd)
2014	Exe Valley, Winter Glow (Devon)	Beowulf, Dark Raven (Staffordshire)	Grainstore, Rutland Beast (Rutland)
2015	Purple Moose, Dark Side of the Moose (Gwynedd)	Ulverston, Fra Diavolio	Castle Rock, Midnight Owl
2016	Old Dairy, Snow Top; Marble, Chocolate	Beowulf, Dark Raven; Parmers, Tally Ho!	Adnams, Old Ale; Brampton, Mild
2017	Grainstore Brewery	Sarah Hughes, Dark Ruby Mild	Adnams, Old Ale; Old Dairy, Snow Top
2018	Tintagel, Excalibur	Untapped, Ember	Jennings, Sneck Lifter
2019	Tintagel, Excalibur	Harvey, Old Ale	Brampton, Mild
2020	Competition cancelled due to COVID-19 pandemic
2023	Brampton, Mild	Sarah Hughes, Dark Ruby	Great Corby, Fox Brown Ale
2024	Muirhouse, Magnum Mild	Windswept, Wolf	Tiny Rebel, Cwtch
2025	Tintagel, Caliburn	Orkney, Dark Island	Merlin, Dark Magic
Source: Champion Winter Beer of Britain Results

=== Barley Wines category ===
==== Barley Wines category (1992-2014) ====
Year	Gold	Silver	Bronze
1992	Gibbs Mew, Bishops Tipple	Woodforde's, Headcracker (Norfolk)	Lees, Moonraker (Manchester)
1993	Woodforde's, Headcracker (Norfolk)	Marston's, Owd Rodger (Burton upon Trent)	n/a
1994	Woodforde's, Headcracker (Norfolk)	Robinsons, Old Tom (Stockport)	Gibbs Mew, Bishops Tipple
1995	Cottage, Norman Conquest (Somerset)	Woodforde's, Headcracker (Norfolk)	Pilgrim, Conqueror
1996	No event was held this year
1997	McMullen's, Stronghart	Robinsons, Old Tom (Stockport)	n/a
1998	Lees, Moonraker (Manchester)	Robinsons, Old Tom (Stockport)	Marston's, Owd Rodger (Burton upon Trent)
1999	Cottage, Norman's Conquest	n/a	n/a
2000	Robinsons, Old Tom (Stockport)	Burton Bridge, Old Expensive	n/a
2001	Orkney, Skullsplitter (Orkney)	Adnams, Tally Ho (Suffolk)	n/a
2002	Big Lamp, Blackout	Robinsons, Old Tom (Stockport)	Adnams, Tally Ho (Suffolk)
2003	Woodforde's, Headcracker (Norfolk)	Harveys, Christmas Ale	Robinsons, Old Tom (Stockport)
2004	Moor, Old Freddy Walker (Somerset)	n/a	n/a
2005	Robinsons, Old Tom (Stockport)	Woodforde's, Headcracker (Norfolk)	Moor, Old Freddy Walker (Somerset)
2006	Hogs Back, A Over T (Surrey)	Isle of Skye, Cuillin Beast (Isle of Skye)	Robinsons, Old Tom (Stockport)
2007	Orkney, Skull Splitter (Orkney)	Green Jack, Ripper (Suffolk)	Durham, Benedictus
2008	Robinsons, Old Tom (Stockport)	Durham, Benedictus	Mighty Oak, Saxon Song
2009	Oakham, Attila (Cambridgeshire)	Hogs Back, A Over T (Surrey)	Otley, O8
2010	Robinsons, Old Tom (Stockport)	Kinver Brewery, Over The Edge (Staffordshire)	Otley, O8
2011	Holdens, Old Ale	Robinsons, Old Tom (Stockport)	Black Isle, Hibernator
2012	Coniston, No. 9 Barley Wine (Cumbria)	Moor, Old Freddy Walker (Somerset)	Isle of Skye, Cuillin Beast (Isle of Skye)
2013	Hogs Back, A Over T (Surrey)	Heart of Wales Brewing, High as a Kite (Powys)	Kinver Brewery, Over The Edge (Staffordshire)
2014	Kinver Brewery, Over the Edge (Staffordshire)	Moor, Old Freddy Walker (Somerset)	Green Jack, Ripple Tripel (Suffolk); Highland, Orkney Porter (Orkney)
2015	Moved to Barley Wines and Strong Old Ales
Source: Champion Winter Beer of Britain Results

==== Barley Wine & Strong Old Ales category ====
Year	Gold	Silver	Bronze
2015	Lees, Moonraker (Manchester)	Orkney, Skullsplitter	Darwin, Extinction Ale
2016	Tring, Death or Glory; Darwin, Extinction Ale	Orkney, Skull Splitter; Moor, Old Freddy Walker	Robinsons, Old Tom; Broughton, Old Jock
2017	Moor, Old Freddy Walker	Green Jack, Ripper, Tripel	Orkney, Skull Splitter
2018	Green Jack, Ripper	Boot, Beast	Exmoor, Exmoor Beast
2019	Lacons, Audit Ale	Tring, Death or Glory	Robinson, Old Tom
2020	Competition cancelled due to COVID-19 pandemic
2023	Robinsons, Old Tom	Exmoor, Beast	Darwin, Extinction
2024	Sarah Hughes, Snowflake	Moor Beer, Old Freddy Walker	Green Jack, Ripper
2025	Sarah Hughes, Snowflake	Abbeydale, Black Mass	Exmoor, Beast
Source: Champion Winter Beer of Britain Results

=== Stout & Porter category ===
==== Stout & Porter category (1991-2007) ====
Year	Gold	Silver	Bronze
1991	Mauldons, Black Adder (Suffolk)	Burton, Bridge Porter	West Coast, Guiltless Stout
1992	Bateman, Salem Porter	Malton, Pickwick Porter	Reepham, Velvet Stout
1993	Coach House, Blunderbus	Reepham, Velvet Stout	n/a
1994	Coach House, Blunderbus	Hambleton, Nightmare Porter	Elgood's North Brink Porter (Cambridgeshire)
1995	Harveys, Porter	RCH, Old Slug Porter	Hop Back Entire Stout
1996	No event was held this year
1997	Hambleton, Nightmare	Wickwar, Station Porter (Gloucestershire)	n/a
1998	Shepherd Neame Original Porter; Nethergate, Old Growler	Wickwar, Station Porter (Gloucestershire)	McGuinness, Tommy Todd's Porter
1999	Salopian, Ironbridge Stout	n/a	n/a
2000	Wye Valley, Dorothy Goodbody's Wholesome Stout	High Force, Cauldron Stout	n/a
2001	O'Hanlon's, Port Stout	Nethergate, Old Growler	n/a
2002	Wye Valley, Dorothy Goodbody's Wholesome Stout	Ringwood, XXXXL	Banks & Taylor, Edwin Taylor Extra Stout
2003	Nethergate, Old Growler	Wentworth, Oatmeal Stout	RCH, Old Slug Porter
2004	Shepherd Neame, Original Porter	n/a	n/a
2005	Bateman, Salem Porter	Big Lamp, Summerhill Stout	Spectrum, Old Stoatwobbler
2006	Bazen Knoll, Street Porter	Fuller's, London Porter (London)	Bath Ales, Festivity
2007	Fuller's, London Porter (London)	Cairngorm, Black Gold	St Peter's, Old Style Porter
2008	Separate awards for porters and stouts
Source: Champion Winter Beer of Britain Results

==== Porter category (2008-2019) ====
Year	Gold	Silver	Bronze
2008	Wickwar, Station Porter (Gloucestershire)	Elland, 1872 Porter (West Yorkshire)	Acorn, Old Moor Porter
2009	Elland, 1872 Porter (West Yorkshire)	Fullers, London Porter (London); Townes, Pynot Porter	n/a
2010	Elland, 1872 Porter (West Yorkshire)	Sulwath, Black Galloway	RCH, Old Slug Porter
2011	Dow Bridge's, Praetorian Porter	Beowulf's Finns Hall Porter	Red Squirrel's London Porter
2012	Hammerpot, Bottle Wreck Porter (West Sussex)	Blythe, Johnson's (Staffordshire)	Sulwath, Black Galloway (Dumfries and Galloway)
2013	Elland Brewery, 1872 Porter (West Yorkshire)	Blythe Brewery, Johnson's (Staffordshire)	Derby Brewery, Penny's Porter (Derbyshire)
2014	Dunham Massey, Dunham Porter (Greater Manchester)	Ayr Brewery, Rabbie's Porter (Ayrshire)	Batemans, Salem Porter (Lincolnshire)
2015	Elland Brewery, 1872 Porter (West Yorkshire)	Bath Ales, Festivities; Fuller's, London Porter (London)	Blakemere, Deep Dark Secret
2016	Elland Brewery, 1872 Porter (West Yorkshire); Facer's, North Star Porter	Ayr, Rabbies Porter; RCH, Old Slug Porter	Red Fox, Black Fox Porter; 8 Sails, Victorian Porter
2017	Sulwath Brewers, Black Galloway	Elland Brewery, 1872 Porter	Tavy Ales, Tavy Porter
2018	Red Cat, Mr M's Porter	Dunham Massey, Dunham Porter	Grain, Slate
2019	Calverley, Porter	Harviestoun, Old Engine Oil	Dancing Duck, Indian Porter
2020	Competition cancelled due to COVID-19 pandemic
2023	Categories changed to strengths
Source: Champion Winter Beer of Britain Results

==== Stout category (2008-2019) ====
Year	Gold	Silver	Bronze
2008	Hop Back, Entire Stout (Wiltshire)	Spitting Feathers, Old Wavertonian	Spire, Sgt Pepper Stout
2009	Bristol Beer Factory, Milk Stout	Beowulf, Dragon Smoke Stout	Spire, Sgt Pepper Stout
2010	Acorn, Gorlovka Imperial Stout (South Yorkshire)	Beowulf, Dragon Smoke Stout	Wapping, Stout
2011	Hop Back, Entire Stout (Wiltshire)	Hop Star's, Smokey Joes Black Beer	Milton's, Nero
2012	Cairngorm, Black Gold (Aviemore)	Cambridge Moonshine, Black Hole Stout (Cambridgeshire)	Acorn, Gorlovka (South Yorkshire)
2013	Bartrams Brewery, Comrade Bill Bartram's EAISS [Egalitarian Anti-Imperialist Soviet Stout] (Suffolk)	Marble Beers, Stouter Stout (Greater Manchester)	Hop Back, Entire Stout (Wiltshire)
2014	Cairngorm, Black Gold (Highlands, Scotland)	Ascot Ales, Anastasia's Exile Stout (Surrey)	Marble, Stouter Stout (Greater Manchester)
2015	Dancing Duck, Dark Drake	Plain Ales, Incognito	Highland, Sneeky Wee Orkney Stout
2016	Plain Ales, Inncognito Stout; Wibblers, Crafty Stoat	Cairngorm, Black Gold; Thornbridge, St Petersburg Imperial Russian Stout	Thornbridge, St Petersburg Russian Stout; Cairngorm, Black Gold
2017	Magic Rock, Dark Arts	London Brewing Company, 100 Oysters Stout	Loch Lomond, Silkie Stout
2018	Siren Craft, Broken Dream Breakfast Stout	Cairngorm, Black Gold	Fixed Wheel, Blackheath Stout
2019	Plain Ales, Inncognito	Dark Star, Imperial Stout	Cairngorm, Black Gold
2020	Competition cancelled due to COVID-19 pandemic
2023	Categories changed to strengths
Source: Champion Winter Beer of Britain Results

==== Session Stouts and Porters category ====
Year	Gold	Silver	Bronze
2023	Dancing Duck, Dark Drake	Thurston, Milk Stout	Beowulf, Dragon Smoke Stout
2024	Lancaster, Black	Church End, Stout Coffin	Cullercoats, Polly Donkin Oatmeal Stout
2025	Cairngorm, Black Gold	Blackjack, Manchester Stout	Dancing Duck, Dark Drake
Source: Champion Winter Beer of Britain Results

==== Strong Stouts and Porters category ====
Year	Gold	Silver	Bronze
2023	Elland, 1872 Porter	Fixed Wheel, Blackheath Stout	Ashover, Milk Stout
2024	Elland, 1872 Porter; Green Jack, Baltic Porter	n/a	Longdog, Lamplight Porter
2025	Grain, Slate	Fixed Wheel, Blackheath Stout	Acorn, Gorlovka Imperial Stout
Source: Champion Winter Beer of Britain Results

=== Speciality Beers ===
Speciality beers moved from Champion Beer of Britain festival category

==== Speciality, Differently Produced category ====
Year	Gold	Silver	Bronze
2023	Chapter, Dead Man’s Fist	Black Hole, Milky Way	Treens, Smoulder
2024	Chapter, Dead Man’s Fist	Cromarty, Red Rocker	Treen, Smoulder
2025	Allendale, Adder Lager	Anspach & Hobday, Smoked Brown	Cromarty, Red Rocker
Source: Champion Winter Beer of Britain Results

==== Speciality, Flavoured category ====
Year	Gold	Silver	Bronze
2023	Marble, Earl Grey IPA	Purple Moose, Elderflower Ale	Siren Craft, Broken Dream Breakfast Stout
2024	Purple Moose, Elderflower Ale	Cerne Abbas, Gurt Coconuts Rum Stout	Enville, Ginger
2025	Siren, Broken Dream Breakfast Stout	Mr. Winter, Vanilla Latte	Purple Moose, Cwrw Ysgawen [Elderflower Ale]
Source: Champion Winter Beer of Britain Results
