= Jeff Evans =

British writer and journalist

- Born: 1960 (age 65–66)
- Occupations: Writer and journalist

Jeff Evans (born 1960) is a British writer and journalist. He is the author the Good Bottled Beer Guide, and was the editor of the Good Beer Guide from 1991 to 1998. He has also written extensively about television.

== Biography ==
Jeff Evans was born 1960 in South Wales and studied languages at the University of Reading. He has been writing professionally about beer since the 1980s. He became editor of the Campaign for Real Ale (CAMRA)'s Good Beer Guide in 1990 and was responsible for eight editions of the Guide (1991–1998).

Evans has written several books on beer, including eight editions of the Good Bottled Beer Guide, three editions of The Book of Beer Knowledge, The CAMRA Beer and Pubs Quiz Book, A Beer a Day, which won the Coors Brewers National Journalism Award in 2008, So You Want to be a Beer Expert? and the e-book Beer Lover's Britain. His work has been published in journals in the UK and US, including All About Beer magazine; he is Chairman of the Judges for the International Beer Challenge, and has hosted beer talks and tastings at public events such as the Great British Beer Festival and the BBC's Good Food Show. He ran the online beer magazine Inside Beer for ten years.

Evans has received various awards for his writing including Beer Writer of the Year in 2001 and Wells and Young's Business to Business Journalism Award in 2009.

Evans has also written several books about television including The Guinness Television Encyclopedia, four editions of The Penguin TV Companion, Evans' TV Trivia, Midsomer Murders: The Making of an English Crime Classic and Rock & Pop on British TV. He has also set questions for TV quiz programmes, including 100% and Fifteen to One (having previously reached one of the series' grand finals), and appeared, alongside fellow beer writers, in the programmes Battle of the Brains and Eggheads in 2009. In 2016, with Brian Chesney, he was British Quizzing Pairs champion.

== Bibliography ==
- Good Bottled Beer Guide ISBN 978-1-85249-309-7
- The Book of Beer Knowledge ISBN 978-1-85249-292-2
- A Beer a Day ISBN 978-1-85249-235-9
- The Penguin TV Companion ISBN 978-0-14-102424-0
- So You Want to be a Beer Expert? ISBN 978-1-85249-322-6
- Rock & Pop on British TV ISBN 978-1-78305-795-5
