= East India Arms =

Pub in London, England

Coordinates: 51.5123349°N 0.0792325°W

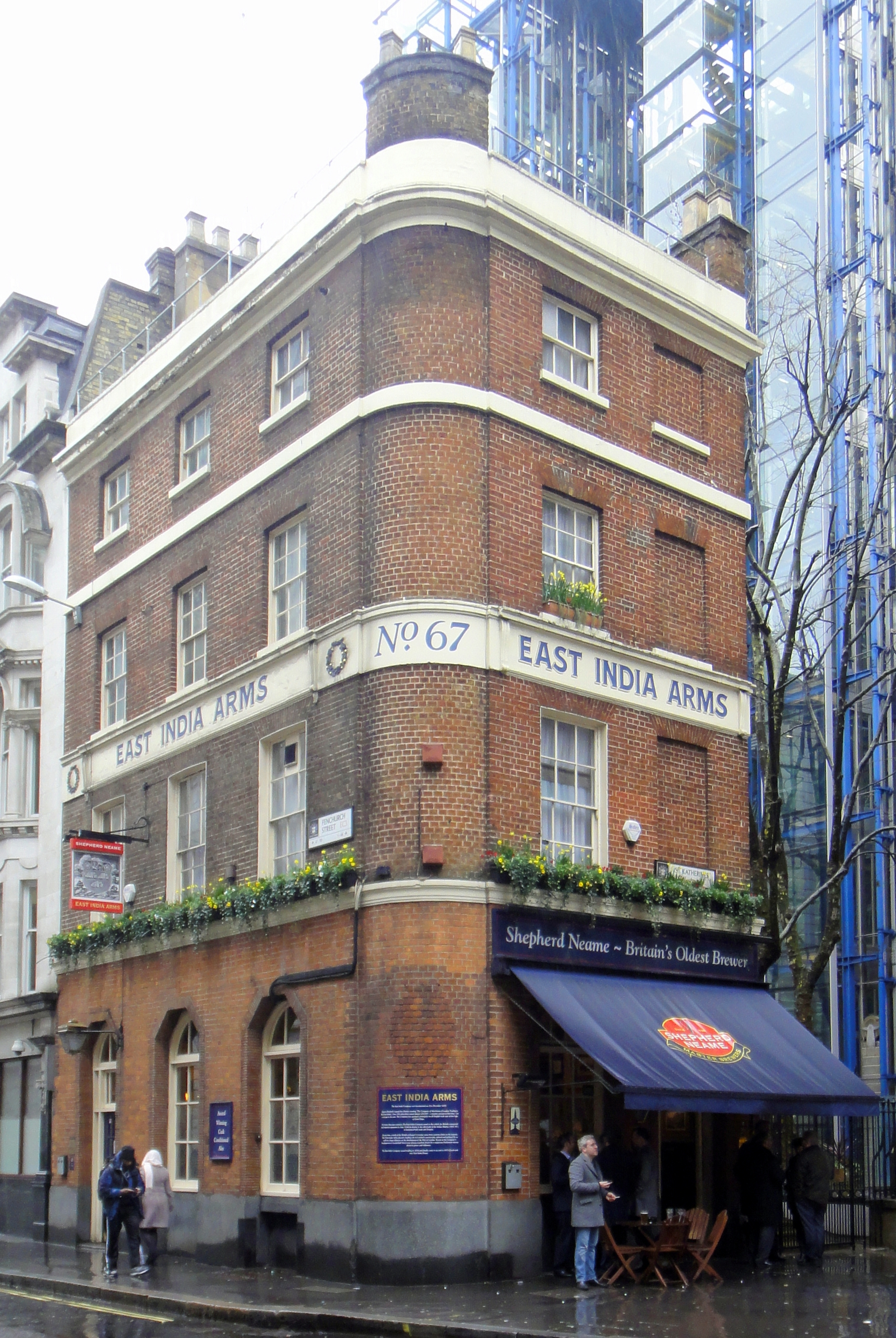
- The East India Arms building, circa 2013
- Interactive map of East India Arms

Restaurant information
- Established: 1829
- Food type: None (pub only)
- Location: 67 Fenchurch Street, London, United Kingdom
- Website: eastindiaarms.co.uk

The East India Arms is a pub in the City of London. The building is located on Fenchurch Street near the place where the East India Company had its headquarters.

== History ==
The pub is believed to stand on the same site in Fenchurch Street previously occupied from at least 1645 by The Magpie Ale House.

The East India Arms was built in 1829 as part of an entire block of then typical London buildings: the houses at 67 to 70 Fenchurch Street were all four-storey buildings in red brick. They originally housed different merchants and service providers having business with the East India Company and trade in East Asia. The other houses in the block were demolished in 1910 due to redevelopment by Paul Hoffman.

In 1838, John Tallis included the East India Arms in his first Atlas of London. The 1829 building is now the oldest building in the Lloyd's Avenue Conservation Area and Fenchurch Street. Within the City of London, it is the only place which still has links to the East India Company. The pub itself is part of the Shepherd Neame brewery.

In the postwar period, office workers of the City visited the pub, though there were also naval officers who were sitting their examinations at the Lloyd's Maritime Academy.

== Architecture and current use ==
The East India Arms is a four-storey building in classic Georgian style. The façade is of red brick. The corner is, typical for buildings of the time, curved, and marks a successful conclusion to the block on which it is located. The red brick forms a striking contrast to the other historic buildings in the area, which are mostly made of Portland stone. In its classic proportions, however, it contributes to forming a coherent ensemble.

The East India Arms is a classic British pub, with only bar stools and standing room, and serving no food (though it is possible to consume one's own food). The pub serves beer, in particular from Shepherd Neame Brewery. Despite the connection to the East India Company, however, India Pale Ale is served on draught, though Shepherd Neame's IPA is served in bottles. The interior is decorated with old photos of the area and mirrors. The single room has a wooden floor. It is primarily frequented by employees of nearby offices.

== Connections to the East India Company ==
On the outside of the pub is a plaque to the East India Company and its history. Although the pub is the only reminder in central London of the East India Company, there is no direct connection between the two. The East India Arms opened on this site about 20 years before the end of the company. It is therefore very likely that employees of the Company frequented it in its early days.
