= The Hyde =

Area in London, England

Coordinates: 51.5822°N 0.2478°W

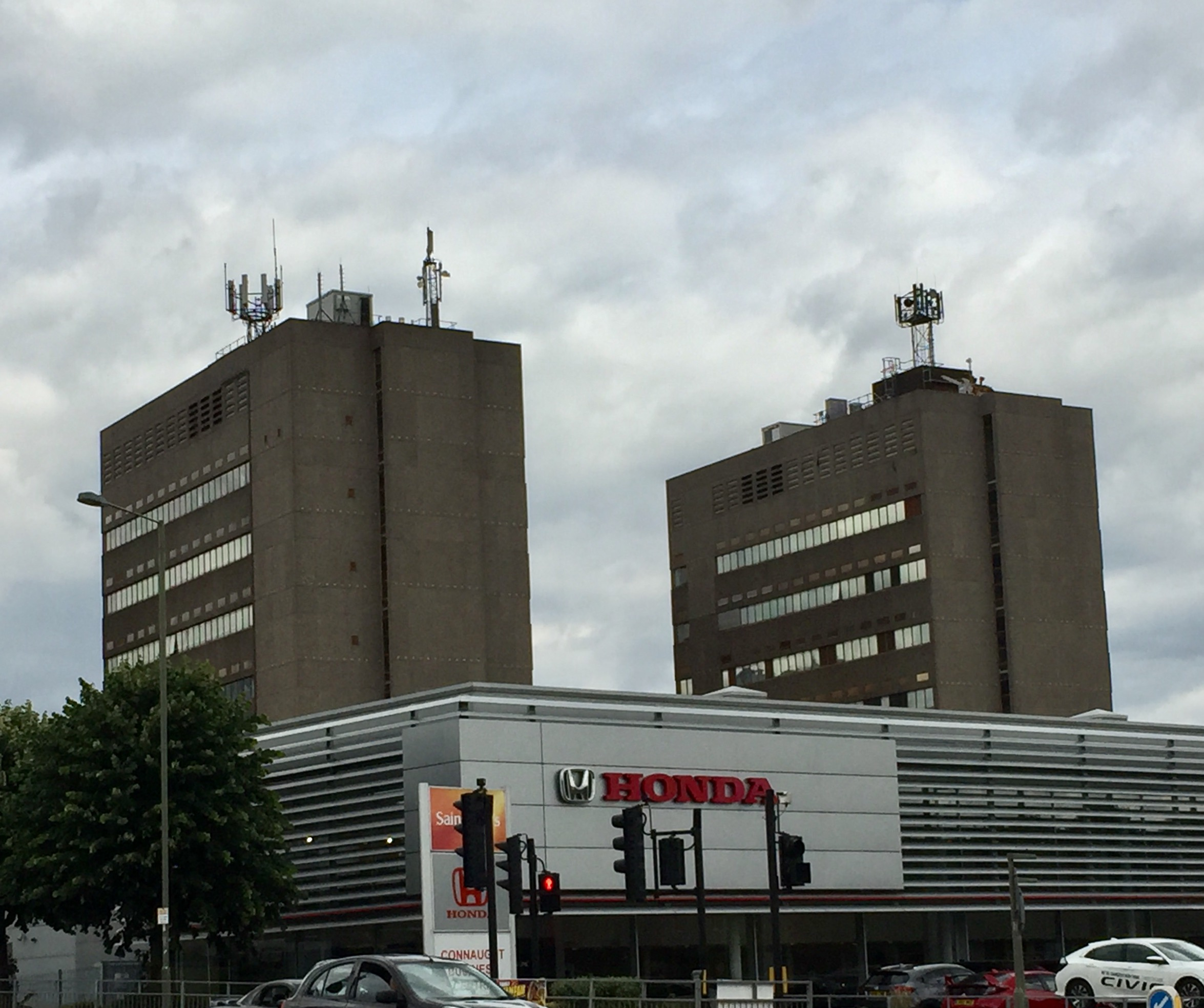
- The big switching centre buildings of the BT Colindale telephone exchange in The Hyde

- Location within Greater London
- OS grid reference: TQ213885
- London borough: Barnet
- Ceremonial county: Greater London
- Region: London
- Country: England
- Sovereign state: United Kingdom
- Post town: LONDON
- Postcode district: NW9
- Dialling code: 020
- Police: Metropolitan
- Fire: London
- Ambulance: London
- UK Parliament: Hendon
- London Assembly: Barnet and Camden

The Hyde is a locality in the London Borough of Barnet in London, England, and is also the name of its accompanying main road on the A5. It is located to the east of Kingsbury, west of Hendon and south of Colindale. The area contains Hyde House (a large building partly used as a hotel), Hendon Magistrates' Court, a large Sainsbury's supermarket, Silkbridge Retail Park, and BT Colindale House telephone exchange.

== History ==
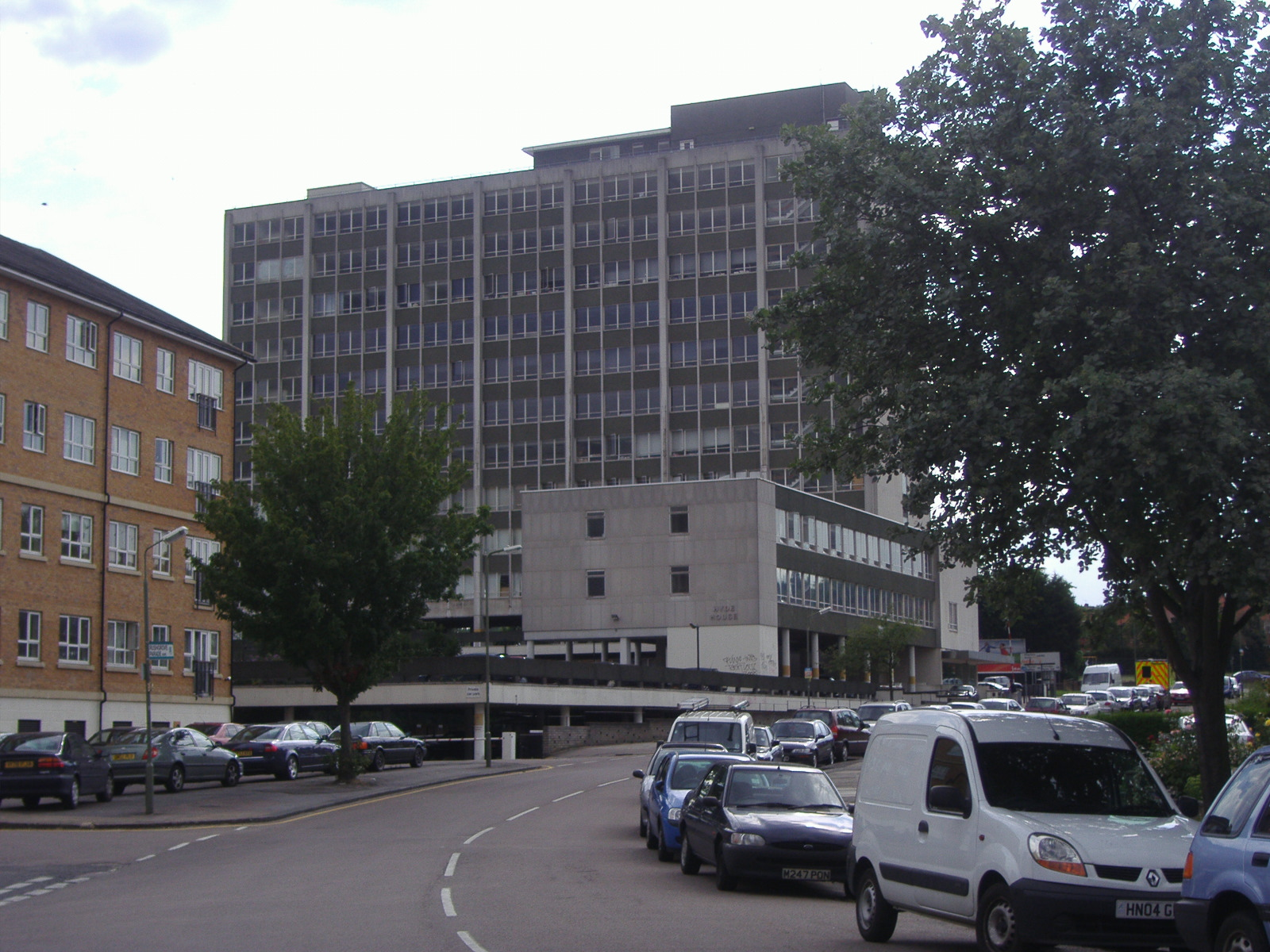
Hyde House

The name is first recorded in 1281 as la Hyde meaning "the hide of land", the amount of land considered enough to support a family, equal to around 120 acres (0.49 km^{2}). The Hendon Brewery was built here in 1855.

The Hyde was home to the offices of Airco (until the company's closure in 1920), and also to the Head Office of furniture retailer MFI between 1989 and 2006, the greater part of that company's existence.

Colindale Telephone Exchange was extended in the 1960s by British Telecom behind the 1930s vintage exchange building. Business activity at the site has decreased dramatically. In 2017 Barnet Council backed a regeneration scheme for new housing and converting the office units to residential ones.

A public house called the Red Lion was at the corner of the A5 and Kingsbury Road. It closed in 2005 and the building was demolished in 2009.

New apartments were built in 2017 at the site of a former Homebase store and used car dealership, on the eastern side of the A5.

In 2020, plans were approved by Barnet Council to demolish the existing Hendon Sainsbury's supermarket on The Hyde and replace it with a new Sainsbury's along with 1,309 homes, despite strong opposition.

== Geography ==
It is located at grid ref TQ215885. It is part of the NW postcode area. A short section of the A5 road in the area is also called The Hyde.
