= IFBB =

IFBB may refer to:

- Independent Family Brewers of Britain
- International Fitness and Bodybuilding Federation
- Institute for Food, Brain and Behaviour
