= Roger Protz =

British beer writer (born 1939)

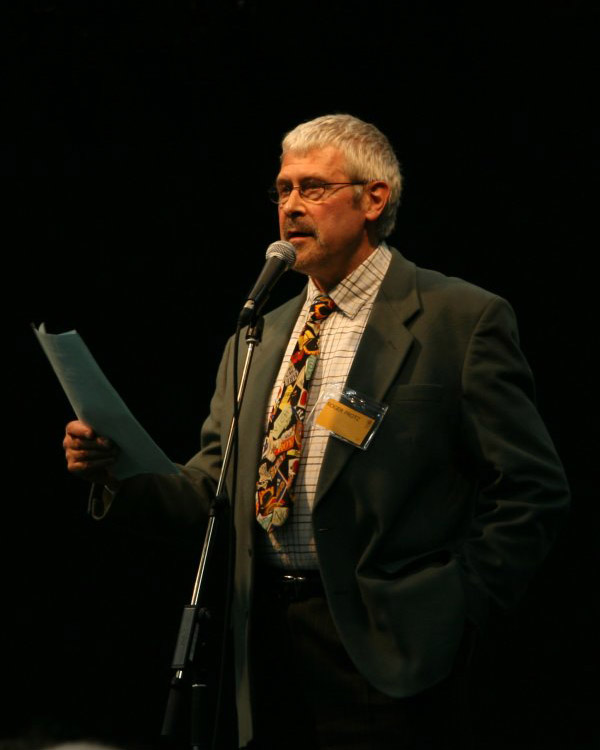
Roger Protz at the Great British Beer Festival 2006

Roger Protz (born 5 February 1939) is a British writer, journalist and campaigner. He joined the Campaign for Real Ale (CAMRA) in 1976 and has written several books on beer and pubs. Between 1978 and 1983 and from 2000 to 2018 he was the editor of CAMRA's Good Beer Guide.

== Biography ==
Protz was born in Deptford, London to a working-class family in 1939. His father was a dockworker. During the Blitz he was evacuated with his mother to Norfolk. He grew up in East Ham in the East End of London and left school aged 16.

Protz joined the Labour Party Young Socialists and had been appointed as editor of its newspaper, New Advance, by 1961. While in the Labour Party, he joined the Socialist Labour League. In the 1960s, he also worked as a sub-editor on the features desk at the Evening Standard. In 1961, he resigned from New Advance to become the editor of the SLL's youth newspaper Keep Left. In 1964, he became editor of the Militant newspaper, and in 1968 of Socialist Worker, until removed in 1974. Subsequently, he spent a period lecturing part-time in journalism at the London College of Printing. Following a national economic crisis he lost his job.

Protz was hired by CAMRA in 1976 to edit its monthly magazine. He edited The Good Beer Guide from the 1978 edition onwards.

He writes a regular column for the Publican's Morning Advertiser, a monthly column for What's Brewing and also contributes to Beers of the World and All About Beer. He also wrote a beer column for The Guardian until 2006. In 2007, he lectured on the history of beer to the Smithsonian Institution in Washington, D.C.. In 1988 he founded the British Guild of Beer Writers and was chairman of the Guild 2000–2003.

Protz edited the Campaign for Real Ale's Good Beer Guide from 1978 to 1983 and from 2000. He announced in autumn 2017 that the 2018 Guide was to be his last.

== Publications ==
- Britain's 500 Best Pubs. London: Carlton Books, 2000 ISBN 978-1-85868-826-8.
- The Complete Guide to World Beer, 2004. ISBN 1-84442-865-6.
- Classic Stout and Porter, 1997. ISBN 1-85375-220-7.
- The Ultimate Encyclopedia of Beer, 1995. ISBN 1-86309-142-4.
- 300 Beers to Try Before You Die, 2005. ISBN 978-1-85249-273-1.
- 300 More Beers to Try Before You Die, 2013. ISBN 978-1-85249-295-3.
- The Family Brewers of Britain: A celebration of British brewing heritage. 2020. ISBN 978-1-85249-359-2.
- The Ale Trail: A celebration of the revival of the world's oldest beer style. 1995. ISBN 1-85882-041-3.

Media offices
Preceded by New position	Editor of Socialist Worker; 1968–1974	Succeeded by Paul Foot
