= Hop Back Brewery =

English brewery

Hop Back Brewery Plc
- Industry: Alcoholic beverage
- Founded: 1987
- Founder: John Gilbert
- Headquarters: Downton, Salisbury, Wiltshire, United Kingdom
- Products: Beer
- Production output: 16000 UK barrels (in 2005)
- Website: http://www.hopback.co.uk/

Hop Back, one of England's small breweries, brewers of Summer Lightning, Crop Circle, G.F.B. and other beers was founded by John Gilbert. Beer was first brewed in 1987 at the Wyndham Arms in Salisbury, and moved to larger premises in Downton five years later.

As of 2025, Hop Back own ten public houses mostly around the south of England.

== Cask Beers ==
- Summer Lightning 5.0% ABV
- GFB (Gilbert's First Brew) 3.5% ABV
- Crop Circle 4.2% ABV
- Entire Stout 4.5% ABV

CAMRA Champion Winter Beer of Britain 2011

- Fugglestone 4.0% ABV
- Taiphoon 4.2% ABV

Plus a range of monthly and seasonal specials

== Keg Beers ==
- Sirocco 4.6% ABV
- Entire Stout 4.5% ABV

== Bottled Beers ==
- Summer Lightning
- Crop Circle (GF)
- Taiphoon (GF)
- Entire Stout (Vegan)
- Winter Lightning
- Pickled Santa

== Pubs ==
- The Dolphin, Weymouth
- The Duck, Salisbury
- The Gluepot, Swindon
- The Hopleaf, Reading
- The Archer, Wolstanton
- The Southgate, Devizes
- The Sultan, Wimbledon
- The Waterloo Arms, Southampton
- The Wyndham Arms, Salisbury
- The Albion, Winchester
