= Wye Valley Brewery =

British brewery

- Industry: Alcoholic beverage
- Founded: 1985
- Founder: Peter Amor
- Headquarters: Stoke Lacy, Herefordshire, UK
- Products: Beer
- Production output: 51,000+ bbl/year
- Website: www.wyevalleybrewery.co.uk

Wye Valley Brewery is a brewery in the village of Stoke Lacy, Herefordshire, England, in the Wye Valley. Founded in 1985 by Peter Amor, it has become "one of Britain's leading independent breweries". In 2002 Peter Amor's son, Vernon Amor, became managing director.

== History and location ==
Wye Valley Brewery is a family business started by former Guinness brewer, Peter Amor, in the summer of 1985. After brewing for Guinness he began brewing from the back of a pub in Canon Pyon, Herefordshire, but soon moved to the old stable block of the brewery's first pub, The Barrels, in Hereford.

Meanwhile Peter's son Vernon, after studying at Young's Brewery in London, joined the brewery to help with the demands of the growing business. By 2002 the brewery had outgrown its stable block at The Barrels, so it moved to a 9-acre (3.6 ha) former cider mill in Stoke Lacy.

As well as supplying its beers to free houses throughout the West Midlands, South West and South Wales, the brewery has eight of its own pubs.

== Brewery ==
The facade of Wye Valley Brewery

Wye Valley Brewery is located in Herefordshire. Over half of its hops and raw ingredients come directly from farms within 10 miles (16 km) of the brewery.

=== Green brewing ===
As a brewing method, Wye Valley Brewery uses water vapour, created during the brewhouse boil, to heat water to then clean its casks; the roof and ground-mounted solar panels cover the equivalent of more than six tennis courts, providing over half of the brewery's total electricity.

== Beers ==
=== Core range ===
Wye Valley Brewery's flagship beer is Butty Bach, translated from the Welsh as "little friend". This 4.5% smooth, full-bodied, premium ale is burnished gold in colour, and has been crowned "Beer of the Festival" at the Great Welsh Beer Festival on three occasions. Alongside this:

- HPA (Hereford Pale Ale) a 4.0% is the straw-coloured ale with a citrusy aroma.
- The Hopfather, a 3.9% smooth red ale featuring tropical citrus and grapefruit flavours.
- Golden Ale, a 4.2% a light gold coloured ale brewed using Fuggles and Goldings hops.
- Wholesome Stout, a 4.6% dark, full-bodied beer boasting roasted coffee notes and a dry, bitter finish.
- Wye Valley Bitter, a 3.7% chestnut coloured ale, with a malty flavour and a clean bitter finish. It was renamed 'Pyoneer' in 2025.

In addition to the core beer line, they produce a rotation of monthly ales as well.

=== 1985 ===
In 2016 Wye Valley Brewery launched its first ever lager, 1985, which has won an international award. The lager is a natural extension to the brewery's range of real ales, is preservative free and made using ingredients sourced within a 10-mile (16 km) radius of the brewery. Locally grown Pilot hops give 1985 an earthy bitterness, whilst traditional European hops provide a delicate fruity aroma. The result is a 4.5% abv premium lager with a crisp, clean taste.

=== Nightjar ===
In 2022 Wye Valley Brewery launched its keg stout called Nightjar. A dark British stout with rich coffee notes, intense roasted barley flavours and a dry, bitter finish.
