= Woodforde's Brewery =

Brewery in Woodbastwick, Norfolk, England

Coordinates: 52.6831°N 1.4431°E

Woodforde’s Brewery
- Industry: Alcoholic beverage
- Founded: 1981
- Headquarters: Woodbastwick, Norfolk, England
- Products: Beer
- Website: http://www.woodfordes.co.uk/

Woodforde's Brewery is a brewery located on Slad Lane in the village of Woodbastwick, in the county of Norfolk, England. The brewery produced its first commercial brew in 1981 from original brewery in the village of Drayton north east of Norwich. In 1996 the brewery's popular Wherry bitter became CAMRA Supreme Champion Beer of Britain.

== History ==
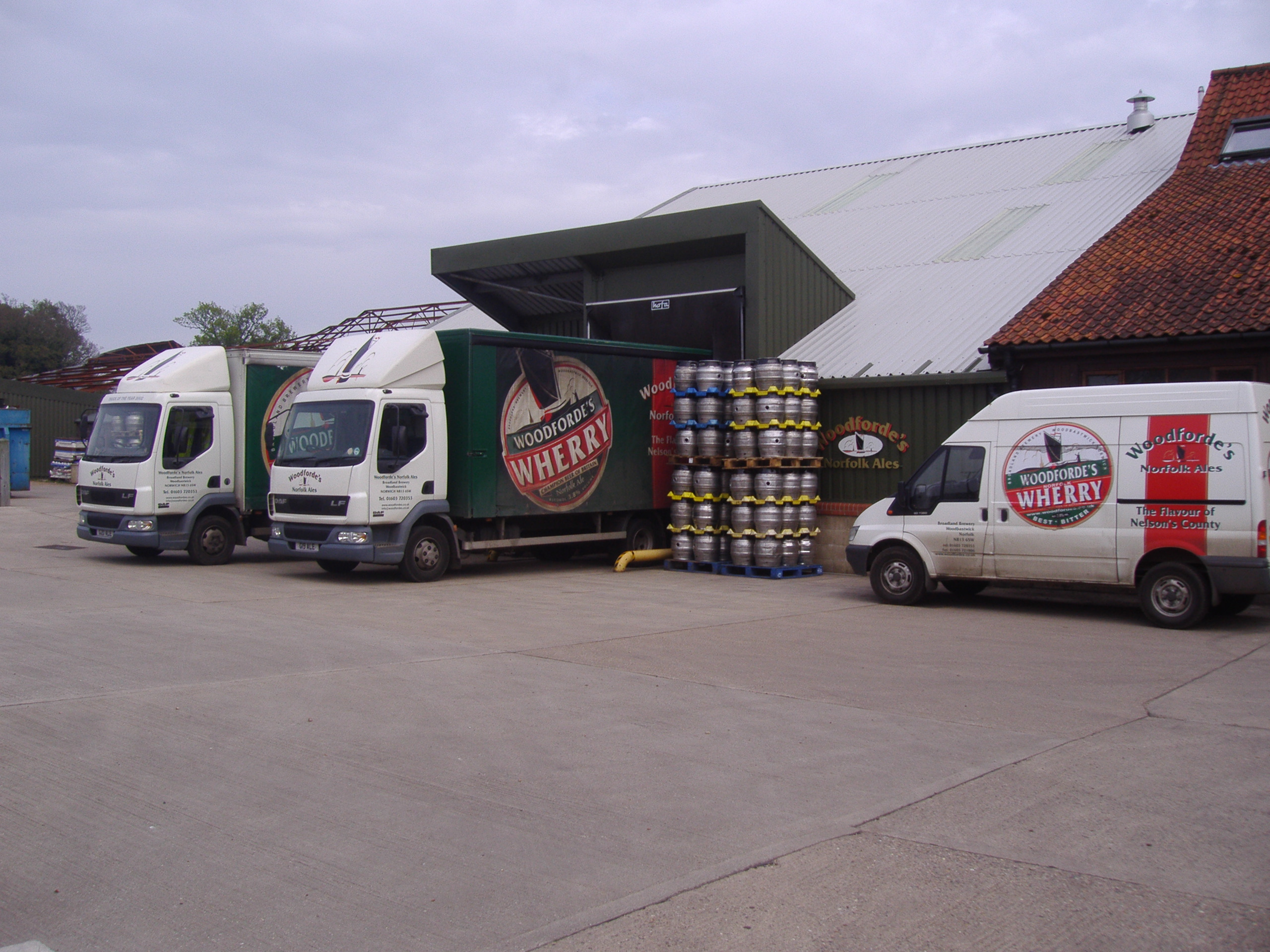
The brewery, Woodbastwick

Good friends, Ray Ashworth and Dr David Crease, had been brewing their own beers since the 60s. The pair opened their very own brewery, and Woodforde's was born. Named after Parson James Woodforde who lived at Weston Longville an 18th Century Parson, whose diaries spoke of his love of good food and beer. As the demand for Woodforde's brews grew, so did the need for a larger space. Moving from Drayton near Norwich in 1989, a group of barns and listed farm buildings were found in Woodbastwick, a village in the Norfolk Broads. Here they have created after renovations, a brewery – where they can still be found today. In May 1992, The Fur & Feather Inn opened, built within a converted row of thatched cottages just steps from the brewery doors. The Woodforde's Brewery Shop and Visitor Centre opened in 1995.

In 2007, they opened a sixty-barrel capacity brewhouse as production continued to expand. Today, there are two brew houses, which run around the clock. In April 2016, the brewery announced that the business had been sold to a group of investors. By the end of 2017, Woodforde's was established as the largest brewery in Norfolk, producing over 20,000 barrels every year, with beers reaching fans across the country and around the globe.

At the beginning of 2018, Master Brewer Neil Bain returned after two years away and takes his place as Head Brewer. Woodforde's began a 5-year sponsorship of Norwich City Football Club, bringing their Wherry to the clubs' bars and kiosks.

Woodforde's new IPA Volt, wins Gold at the International Brewing Awards in the Cask Conditioned Beer - Class 3 category in 2019. As a result, Volt launched in bottles the following year.

Despite COVID19, 2020 saw an increased demand for their beers in supermarkets so all packing was brought in house. It was at this point, that new products Norfolk Adder Cyder and the FIFTYTWO° NORTH craft range were introduced for the very first time.

In 2021, Woodforde's Brewery celebrated their 40-year anniversary with special merchandise, 40th anniversary seasonal ales all year (including the return of old favourites). It was also the arrival of Albion, Woodforde's first stout and names after the traditional Norfolk Wherry, known as the "black sailed trader". Woodforde's also helped The Lord Nelson to reopen in Burnham Thorpe, along with the Holkham Estate, after a 5-year closure.

== Tied houses ==
The brewery has two tied houses in the county of Norfolk. The brewery itself has a Brewery tap called the Fur & Feather situated next to the brewery in the village of Woodbastwick. The Lord Nelson in Burnham Thorpe has also been reopened in 2021.

== Beers ==
Beer	ABV	Style	Availability
Wherry	3.80%	Amber Ale	All Year
Nog	4.60%	Dark Ale	All Year
Nelson's Revenge	4.50%	Special Bitter	All Year
Bure Gold	4.30%	Golden Ale	All Year
Reedlighter	4.00%	Pale Ale	All Year
Volt	4.50%	American IPA	All Year
Norfolk Adder	4.50%	Cider	All Year
Black Adder	4.00%	Sweet Cider	All Year
Albion	4.20%	Cream Stout	All Year
Headcracker	7.00%	Speciality Ale	Occasional Bottling
Once Bittern	4.00%	Bitter	Seasonal
Admiral's Reserve	5.00%	Premium Ale	Seasonal
Royal Norfolk	4.10%	Golden Ale	Seasonal
Tinsel Toes	4.40%	Christmas Ale	Seasonal
Tap & Go	4.00%	English Ale	Seasonal
West Coast Wherry	4.30%	Amber Ale	Seasonal
Harlequin	4.00%	Single Hop	Seasonal
Phoenix	4.20%	Modern IPA	Seasonal
Lionheart	4.00%	Golden Ale	Seasonal
