= Good Beer Guide =

Annual guide to UK real ale outlets

Good Beer Guide 2006

The Good Beer Guide is a book published annually by the Campaign for Real Ale (CAMRA), listing what the organisation considers to be the best 4,500 real ale outlets (pubs, clubs, and off-licences) in the United Kingdom.

== Details ==
First edition in 1974

The content of the Guide is decided upon by volunteers in CAMRA's local branches. Throughout the preceding year, CAMRA members anonymously rate the quality of the cellarmanship of beer in venues using CAMRA's National Beer Scoring System (NBSS) through either WhatPub or the Good Beer Guide app. These scores are then reviewed by local volunteers in the spring, who put forward those they consider to serve the best real ale. The number of entries each branch area has is decided at county level, with an emphasis on ensuring that a geographically wide spread set of entries are included in each year's Guide.

Entries for each venue give details on factual information such as opening times, food availability and accessibility of the property, as well as subjective information such as the attractiveness of the wallpaper and the welcome visitors are likely to get from the bar staff.

The Good Beer Guide also includes a list of real ale breweries in the United Kingdom, with lists and tasting notes on their beers.

After two long stints as editor, Roger Protz announced in autumn 2017 that the Good Beer Guide 2018 would be his last. CAMRA stated that from 2019 the Guide would carry the name of the managing editor.

The Good Beer Guide 2023 featured a foreword by King Charles III.

== History ==
The Guide was first published in 1972 and was just 18 pages long. Rather than a professionally published volume, it was a collection of sheets of paper stapled together and posted out to CAMRA members.

The first printed edition was published in 1974. In a list of the country's brewers, the entry for Watney's consisted of the advice to "Avoid like the plague." Concerned that this statement was libellous, the publisher, Waddington's, recalled the first print run and revised the entry to "Avoid at all costs."

== Editions ==
The Guide is published each year, occasionally with multiple bindings:

Year	Sponsored by	Edited by	Pages	Binding	ISBN
1972		Michael Hardman	18	Unbound	
1974	"Avoid like the plague" version withdrawn	John Hanscomb	96	Paperback	
1974	"Avoid at all costs" replacement version	John Hanscomb	96	Paperback	
1974	Facsimile "Avoid at all costs" version issued March 1996	John Hanscomb	96	Paperback numbered limited edition (of 500)	
1975		Michael Hardman	176	Paperback	
1976		Michael Hardman	224	Paperback	0-09-912290-1
1977		Michael Hardman	256	Paperback	0-09-914510-3
1977		Michael Hardman	256	Hardback	0-09-914510-3
1978		Roger Protz	256	Paperback	0-09-916980-0
1979		Roger Protz	236 + 36 maps	Paperback	0-09-919630-1
1980		Roger Protz	236 + 36 maps	Paperback	0-09-922160-8
1981		Roger Protz	236 + 36 maps	Paperback	0-09-925260-0
1982		Roger Protz	236 + 36 maps	Paperback	0-9503340-7-3
1983		Roger Protz	236 + 36 maps	Paperback	0-950-3340-8-1
1984		Neil Hanson	280 + 36 maps	Paperback	0-950-3340-9-X
1985		Neil Hanson	280 + 36 maps	Paperback	0-9509584-0-9
1986		Neil Hanson	280 + 36 maps	Paperback	0-9509584-1-7
1987		Neil Hanson	280 + 36 maps	Paperback	0-9509584-3-3
1988		Neil Hanson	352	Paperback	1-85249-000-4
1989		Andrea Gillies	384	Paperback	1-85249-001-2
1990	British Coal	Andrea Gillies	480	Paperback	1-85249-002-0
1991	British Coal	Jeff Evans	504	Paperback	1-85249-003-9
1992	British Coal	Jeff Evans	480	Paperback	1-85249-004-7
1993		Jeff Evans	508	Paperback	1-85249-005-5
1993		Jeff Evans	508	Leather-bound	1-85249-005-5
1994		Jeff Evans	512	Paperback	1-85249-006-3
1995		Jeff Evans	528	Paperback	1-85249-007-1
1996		Jeff Evans	544	Paperback	1-85249-008-X
1997		Jeff Evans	544	Paperback	1-85249-009-8
1998	Homefire Smokeless Coal	Jeff Evans	560	Paperback	1-85249-131-0
1998	Homefire Smokeless Coal	Jeff Evans	560	Hardback	1-85249-133-7
1999	Homefire Smokeless Coal	Jonathan Preece	576	Paperback	1-85249-149-3
1999	Homefire Smokeless Coal	Jonathan Preece	576	Hardback	1-85249-154-X
2000	Homefire Smokeless Coal	Roger Protz	578	Paperback	1-85249-159-0
2001	Cask Marque	Roger Protz	578	Paperback	1-85249-163-9
2002	Cask Marque	Roger Protz	804	Paperback	1-85249-178-7
2003	Cask Marque	Roger Protz	830	Paperback	1-85249-176-0
2004	Cask Marque / Beer Seller	Roger Protz	830	Paperback	1-85249-186-8
2005	Beer Seller	Roger Protz	848	Paperback	1-85249-196-5
2006	Waverley TBS	Roger Protz	864	Paperback	1-85249-211-2
2007		Roger Protz	880	Paperback	1-85249-224-4
2008	Cask Marque	Roger Protz	880	Paperback	978-1-85249-231-1
2008	Cask Marque	Roger Protz	880	Hardback	978-1-85249-251-9
2009	Cask Marque	Roger Protz	896	Paperback	978-1-85249-249-6
2010	Cask Marque	Roger Protz	888	Paperback	978-1-85249-266-3
2011	Cask Marque	Roger Protz	888	Paperback	978-1-85249-272-4
2012	Cask Marque / Society of Independent Brewers	Roger Protz	908	Paperback	978-1-85249-286-1
2012	Cask Marque / Society of Independent Brewers	Roger Protz	908	Kindle	-
2013	Cask Marque / Society of Independent Brewers	Roger Protz	944	Paperback	978-1-85249-290-8
2014	Society of Independent Brewers / It's Better Down The Pub	Roger Protz	944	Paperback	978-1-85249-312-7
2015	Society of Independent Brewers / Cyclops Beer	Roger Protz	976	Paperback	978-1-85249-320-2
2016	Pipers Crisp Co.	Roger Protz	1,016	Paperback	978-1-85249-327-1
2017	Cask Marque	Roger Protz	1,032	Paperback	978-1-85249-335-6
2018	Cask Marque	Roger Protz	1,032	Paperback	978-1-85249-344-8
2019	Cask Marque	Emma Haines - Project Manager	1,048	Paperback	978-1-85249-354-7
2020	Cask Marque	Emma Haines - Managing Editor	1,060	Paperback	978-1-85249-358-5
2021		Emma Haines - Managing Editor	912	Paperback	978-1-85249-366-0
2022	Cask Marque / Stay In A Pub	Emma Haines - Managing Editor	896	Paperback	978-1-85249-376-9
2023	Cask Marque	Emma Haines - Managing Editor	944	Paperback	978-1-85249-380-6
2023	Cask Marque	Emma Haines - Managing Editor	944	Hardback numbered limited edition (of 1,775)	978-1-85249-380-6
2024		Emma Haines - Managing Editor	941	Paperback plain cover	978-1-85249-387-5
2024		Emma Haines - Managing Editor	941	Paperback Iron Maiden cover edition	978-1-85249-387-5
2024		Emma Haines - Managing Editor	941	Hardback Iron Maiden cover edition	978-1-85249-387-5
2025	Midland Snacks	Emma Haines - Managing Editor	912	Paperback Coronation Street cover edition	978-1-85249-391-2
2025	Midland Snacks	Emma Haines - Managing Editor	912	Paperback Emmerdale cover edition	978-1-85249-391-2
2026	Midland Snacks	Emma Haines - Managing Editor	912	Paperback	978-1-85249-397-4
2027	Midland Snacks	Emma Haines - Managing Editor	848	Paperback	978-1-85249-401-8

== Other publications ==
In the past, CAMRA also published the Good Cider Guide and the Good Bottled Beer Guide.
