= Woodbastwick =

Village in Norfolk, England

Coordinates: 52.68430°N 1.44730°E

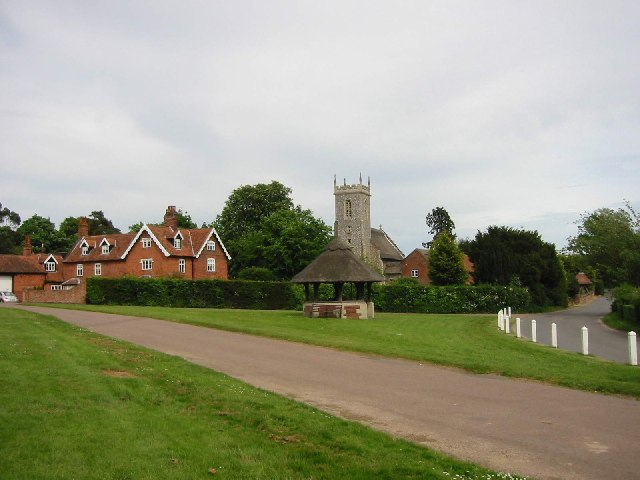
- Woodbastwick Village Green

- Location within Norfolk
- Area: 19.04 km^{2} (7.35 sq mi)
- Population: 399 (2011)
  - Density: 21/km^{2} (54/sq mi)
- OS grid reference: TG331152
- Civil parish: Woodbastwick
- District: Broadland
- Shire county: Norfolk
- Region: East
- Country: England
- Sovereign state: United Kingdom
- Post town: NORWICH
- Postcode district: NR13
- Police: Norfolk
- Fire: Norfolk
- Ambulance: East of England
- UK Parliament: Broadland and Fakenham

Woodbastwick (/ˈwʊdbæstwɪk/ WUUD-bast-wik) is a village and civil parish in the English county of Norfolk. It is located on the River Bure between Cockshoot Broad and Salhouse Broad and is The Broads and close to Bure Marshes National Nature Eeserve. The city of Norwich lies 10 kilometres (6.2 mi) to the south-west. The civil parish also includes the villages of Ranworth and Panxworth.

The village name relates to bast, a pliable substance found under the bark of the lime tree. Danish and Saxon invaders used bast as a form of binding to tie leggings and other items. As a consequence, Woodbastwick's village sign shows two invaders tying their leggings.

The village contains thatched houses set around a village green, and the Church of St Fabian and St Sebastian, which is also thatched. The Woodforde's Brewery is located in the village and produces cask ales such as Wherry Bitter, Nelson's Revenge, Norfolk Nog and Headcracker.

The civil parish has an area of 19.04 km^{2} (7.35 sq mi) and in the 2001 census had a population of 362 in 157 households, increasing to a population of 399 in 168 households at the 2011 Census. For the purposes of local government, the parish falls within the district of Broadland. Woodbastwick Hall is the seat of the Cator family.
