= Woodbastwick Hall =

Country house in Norfolk, England

Coordinates: 52.6928°N 1.4419°E

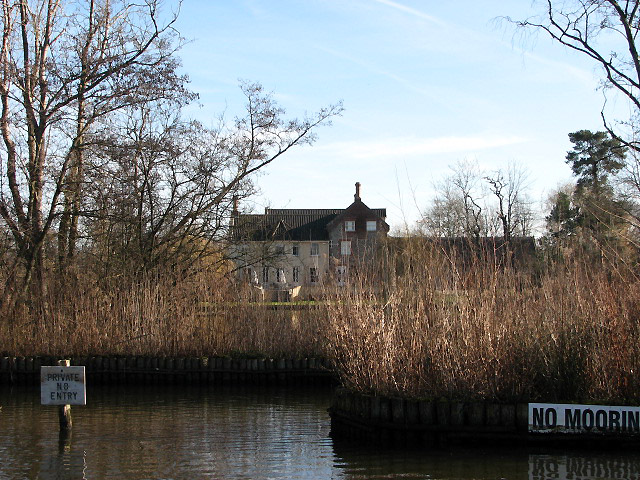
Woodbastwick Hall

Woodbastwick Hall is a country house at Woodbastwick in Norfolk.

== History ==
The house dates back to circa 1600. In 1807 the house and estates were acquired for £76,000 from the trustees of Thomas Allday Kerrison by John Barwell Cator (nephew of John Cator), who became High Sheriff of Kent in 1818. It then passed down the Cator family.

After a fire in 1819, Cator commissioned architect George Smith to rebuild the hall. After another serious fire in December 1882, the house was substantially rebuilt to a design by Ewan Christian (completed in 1889), and then used as a Red Cross auxiliary hospital during the two World Wars and subsequently as an Agricultural Training College until it was demolished in 1971. The house was rebuilt in 2004 and is now in the ownership of Henry Cator.
