= Independent Family Brewers of Britain =

The Independent Family Brewers of Britain (IFBB) was formed in the 1993 by an informal group of family-owned/controlled brewery CEOs known as the Pimlico Group - all of whom were part of the UK's Brewers' Society, now the British Beer and Pub Association.

The group, between them, own over 700 brands and over 4,200 pubs. Current chairman is James Staughton, Managing Director of St Austell Brewery.

== Background ==
The IFBB was launched on 14 April 1993 at the Brewers' Hall in London. It had 36 members.

The defence of 'The Tie' - tying the tenant within his tenancy agreement to buying the brewery's own beers - was a key aim of the IFBB. The organisation also focuses on recruitment of licensees, beer quality training and attracting new cask ale drinkers.

It was intended to act against European Commission proposals that were thought might stop even the smallest brewery owning its own pubs, a move which would have had adverse consequences for Britain's traditional family brewing industry.

Two codes of conduct, one for lessees and one for tenants, has been co-produced with British Beer and Pub Association. Compulsory for members of IFBB it aims to simplify self-regulation and maintain low cost arbitration of disputes. The codes will apply to over 4,000 pubs in England and Wales.

== Members ==
The members are:

- Adnams
- Arkell's
- Batemans
- Daniel Batham
- SA Brain
- Donnington Brewery
- Elgoods
- Everards
- Felinfoel
- Fullers
- Hall and Woodhouse
- Harveys
- Holdens
- Joseph Holt
- Hook Norton
- Hydes
- JW Lees
- McMullens
- Palmers
- Robinson's
- Shepherd Neame
- St Austell
- Theakston Brewery
- Thwaites
- Timothy Taylor
- Wadworths
- Wells and Young's

Former members include:

- Eldridge Pope
- Gales Brewery
- Cains Brewery
