= National Winter Ales Festival =

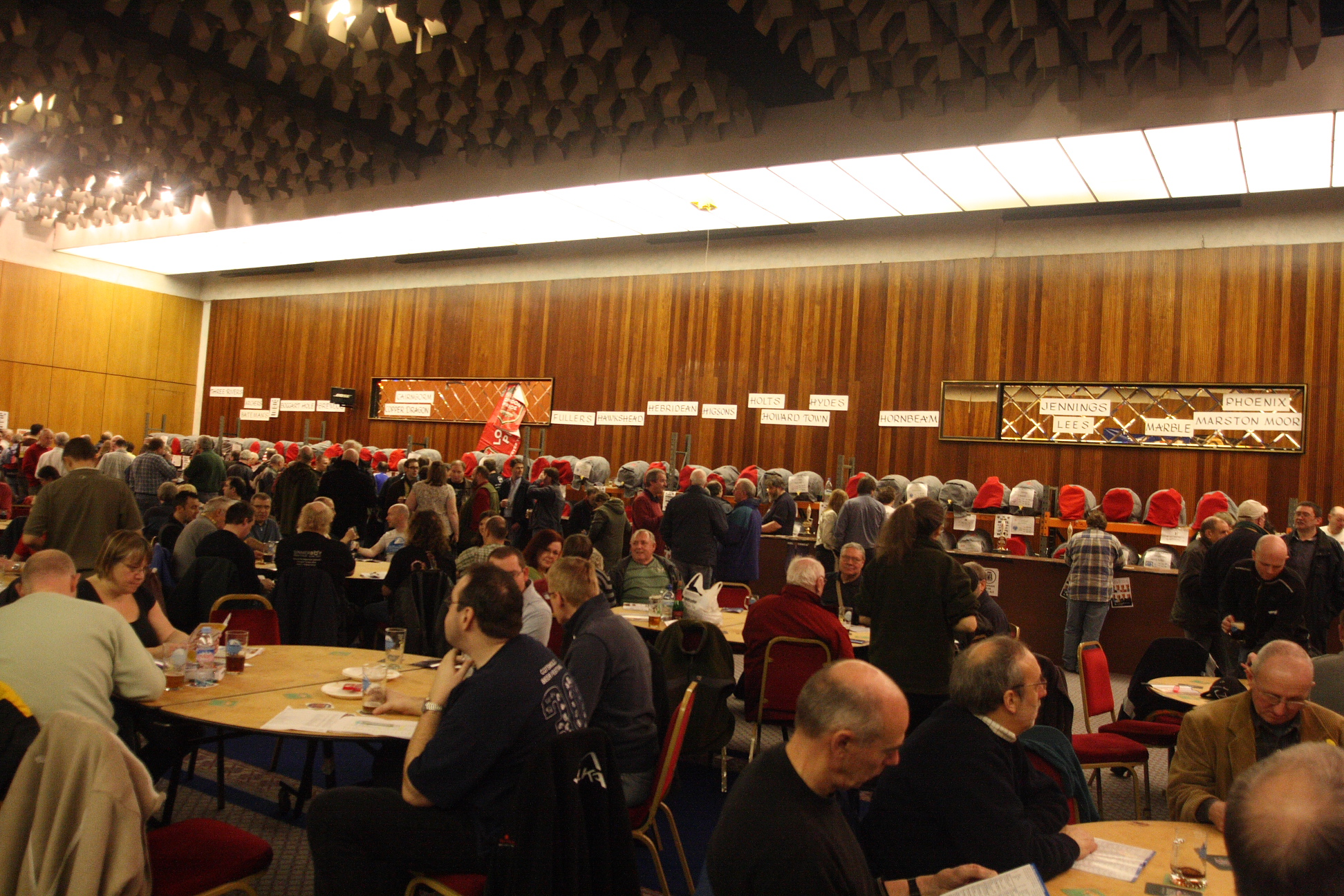
The 2008 National Winter Ales Festival at New Century Hall, Manchester

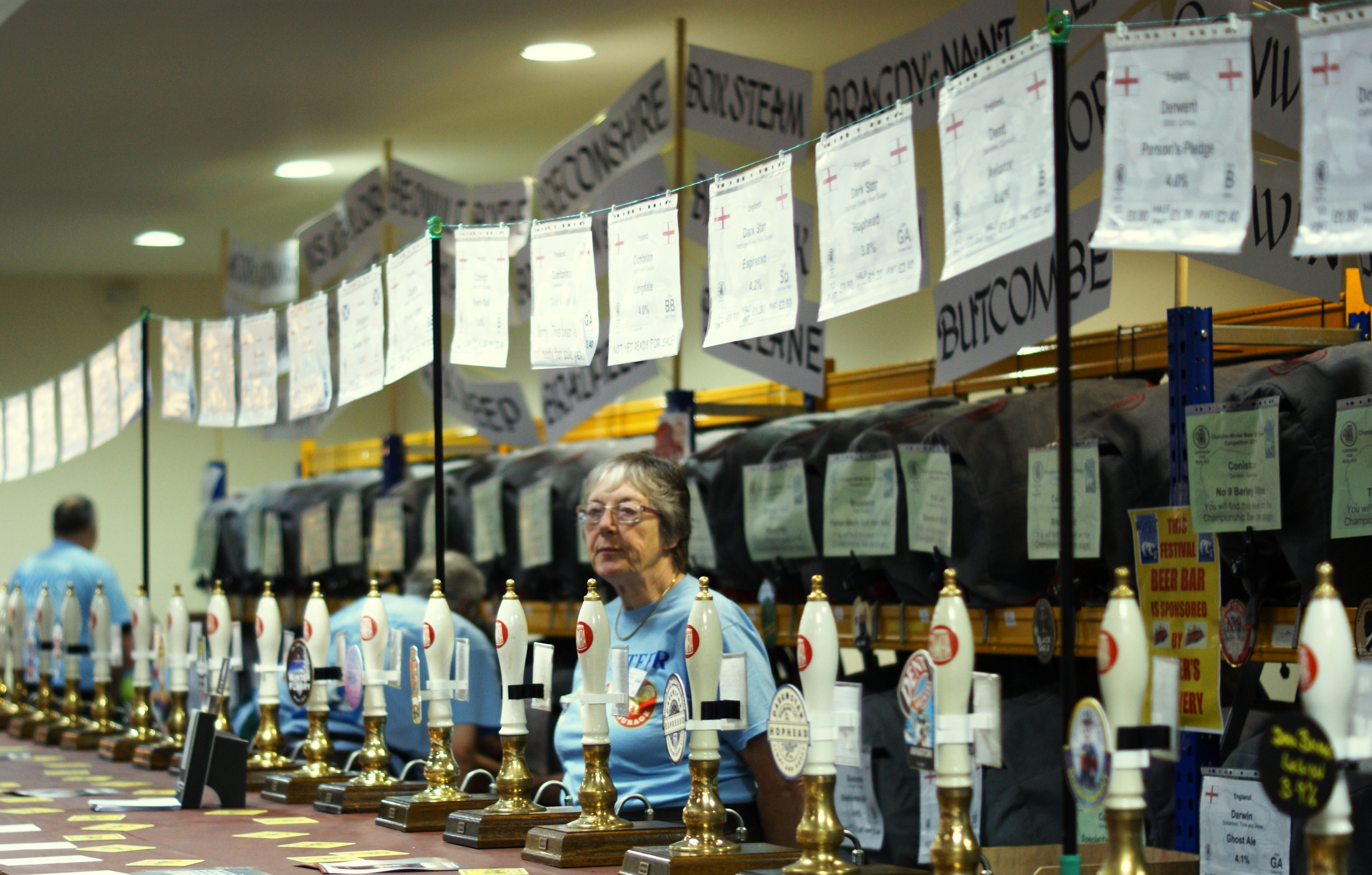
The 2011 National Winter Ales Festival at The Venue, Manchester

The National Winter Ales Festival (NWAF) is organised annually by the Campaign for Real Ale (CAMRA). From 2018 it was marketed as Great British Beer Festival Winter. The event showcases real ales available in the UK in the winter months, especially strong ales, stouts and porters. It was first held in 1997, alongside the Great British Beer Festival. Great British Beer Festival Winter is also home to the Champion Winter Beer of Britain awards.

== Host city and date ==
The festival is generally held in January or February of each year; however there were two festivals in 1997, one at each end of the year. The first one gave the awards for 1996/7 and the second for 1997/8; there was no festival in 1998.

While the summer event has been mostly exclusive to London since 1991, the Great British Beer Festival Winter moves between host cities, allocated on 3-year cycle. Branches of CAMRA around the United Kingdom bid for the event. Derby was the host city for 2014 to 2016 where the event was held at the Roundhouse. The final Derby festival drew 13,832 attendees, the largest in the event's history. They drank a combined 57,000 pints of the 470 beers on offer.

Norwich and Norfolk CAMRA hosted the event in 2017, 2018 and 2019, at The Halls, a medieval complex in Norwich consisting of St Andrew's Hall and Blackfriars' Hall.

== Venues ==
Year	Location	Notes	Ref.
1997	Old Fruit Market, Glasgow		
1999–2002	Upper Campfield Market, Manchester		
2003–2004	Old Town Hall, Burton-on-Trent		
2005–2009	New Century Hall, Manchester		
2010–2013	Sheridan Suite, Manchester		
2014–2016	The Roundhouse, Derby		
2017–2019	The Halls, Norwich		
2020–2022	The New Bingley Hall, Birmingham	2021 and 2022 events cancelled due to COVID-19 pandemic.	
2023–2024	Burton Town Hall, Burton-on-Trent	Incorporated at Burton Beer & Cider Festival	
2025	Magna Science Adventure Centre Rotherham		
2026	-	Cancelled due to financial reasons.	
