= Bath Ales =

Brewery in South Gloucestershire, England

Coordinates: 51°27′27″N 2°28′25″W

- Industry: Alcoholic beverage
- Founded: 1995; 31 years ago
- Headquarters: Warmley, South Gloucestershire, England
- Products: Beer
- Website: www.bathales.com

Bath Ales is a brewery located in the town of Warmley, South Gloucestershire, England; north-west of Bath and east of Bristol.

== History ==
The brewery was established in 1995 by former employees of Smiles Brewery in Bristol. Since that time, it has experienced steady growth, which included opening a new bottling plant in 2007.

On 1 July 2016 Bath Ales was acquired by Cornwall-based St Austell Brewery. In March 2017 a multi-million pound investment in a new brewery and larger bottling and canning facilities was announced.

== Brewery ==
The brewery uses an efficient steam-driven plant. Heat exchangers take the warmth naturally created by the fermentation process and use it to heat the water. The finished grain is then given to local farmers as livestock feed, while the finished hops and yeast are converted into fertiliser.

== Beers ==
The brewery uses simple label artwork, featuring a dashing hare. It brews eleven beers and a cider, which are sold in cask, keg and bottle.

Regular beers include Gem (4.1% abv), a best bitter; Barnsey (formerly Barnstormer) (4.5% abv), a dark bitter; Darkside (4.0% abv), a stout; Golden Hare (4.4% abv), a light ale; Ginger Hare (3.9% abv), a spicy ale; Wild Hare (5.0% abv), a golden gluten-free pale ale; and Special Pale Ale (3.7% abv), a golden pale ale. The seasonal ales are Festivity (5.0% abv), a seasonal rum porter; Rare Hare (5.2% abv), a seasonal premium bitter; Summer's Hare (3.9% abv), a light hoppy beer; and Forest Hare (3.9% abv), a hoppy autumnal ale. Bounders (5.4% abv) and Bounders Traditional (6.0% abv), both ciders, complete the range.
