= Sarah Hughes Brewery =

Historic brewery in England

Sarah Hughes
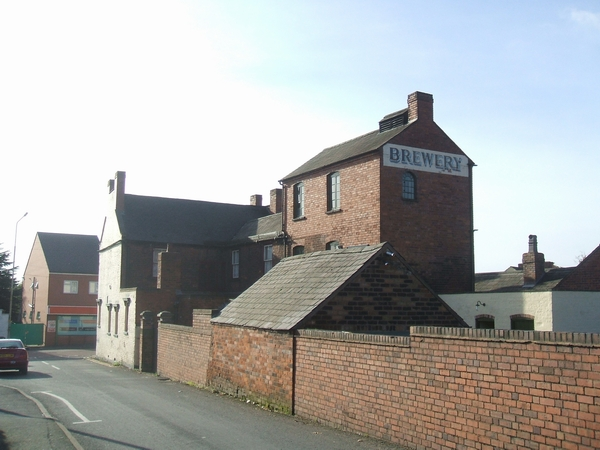
- Interactive map of Sarah Hughes
- Location: Sedgley, West Midlands, England
- Coordinates: 52.543528°N 2.11438°W
- Opened: 1921, closed 1957, re-opened 1987
- Website: sarahhughesbrewery.co.uk

Active beers
Name	Type
Dark Ruby	Mild
Surprise	Bitter
Pale Amber	Bitter

Sarah Hughes Brewery in Sedgley, in the Black Country of England, dates from the Victorian era. It was bought by Sarah Hughes in 1921 and brewed until 1957, before re-opening in 1987.

== History ==
The Beacon Hotel and brew house dates from the Victorian era being built around 1850. In 1865 the licensee was Abraham Carter and the hotel was later run by his widow, Nancy. James Fellows, a brewer, was licensee from 1910 to 1921, before the business was bought by Sarah Hughes. Sarah ran the brewery until her death in 1951. Subsequently, her son, Alfred operated the brewery until 1957 when brewing ceased. It was reopened in 1987 by a grandson of Sarah Hughes.

== Location ==
The brewery is at 129 Bilston Street, Sedgley. It is attached to the Beacon Hotel which acts as the brewery tap.
