= Gales Brewery =

Brewery originally in Horndean, Hampshire, England

George Gale & Co. Ltd

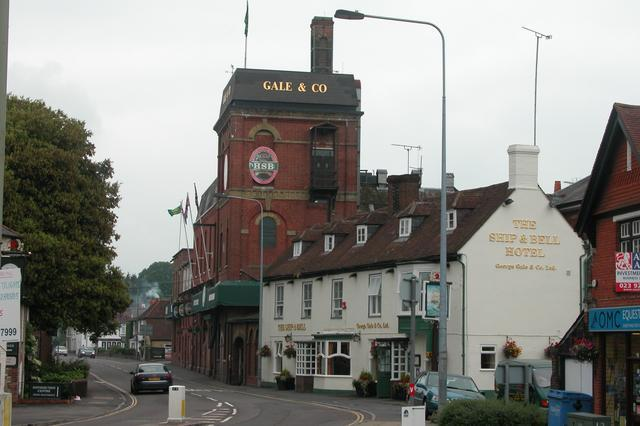
- Gale's Brewery at Horndean
- Company type: Brewery
- Industry: Brewing
- Founded: 1847
- Founder: George Gale
- Defunct: 2006
- Fate: defunct
- Successor: Fullers Brewery
- Headquarters: Horndean, England

George Gale & Co. Ltd was a Hampshire brewery with a distinctive range of, mainly, bitter beers. Founded in 1847 it was bought by the London brewers, Fuller's of Chiswick in 2005. The brewery was closed in 2006 with production transferred to Chiswick.

== History ==
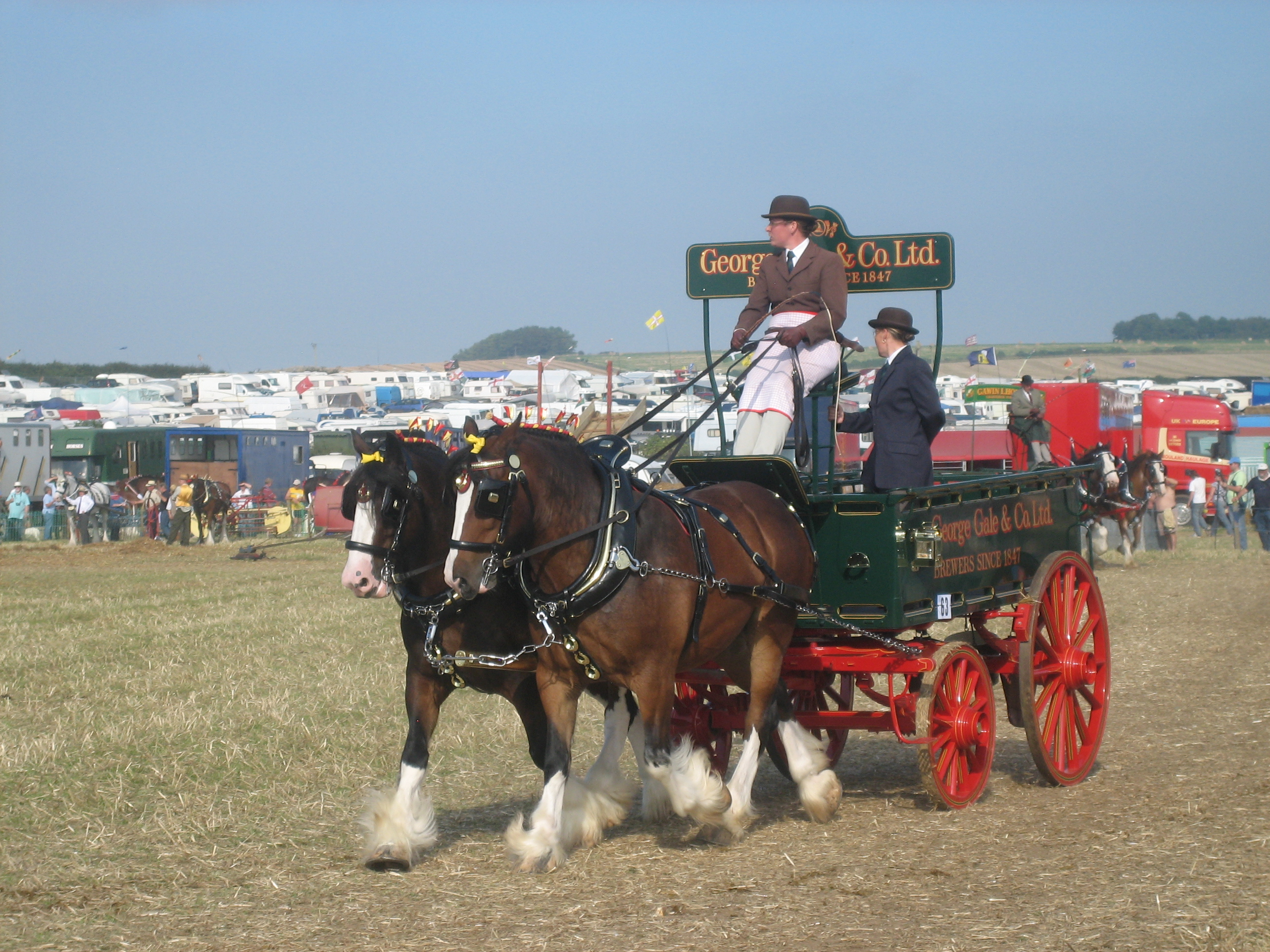
George Gale brewery dray performing at Great Dorset Steam Fair, 30 August 2008

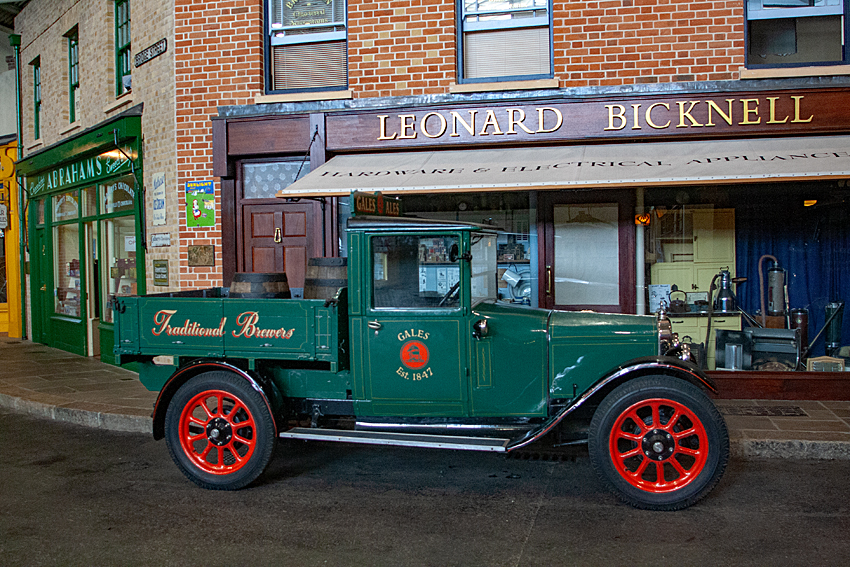
Gales Brewery 1926 Austin motor dray

Established in 1847 Gales Brewery (George Gale & Co. Ltd) was an old brewery situated in Horndean, on the edge of Waterlooville, near Portsmouth in Hampshire, England. It made the nutty HSB (Horndean Special Bitter) and the newer Gales Bitter. It took its water from its own well situated under the brewery which is fed from the South Downs, and the yeast and 'liquor' (local water used for brewing), coupled with the local brewing style, produced beers with a sparse head, quite dark in colour.

In late 2005 Fuller, Smith & Turner bought Gales for £92 million. It raised fears as to the future of Gales Horndean brewery and some of its beers, and the Campaign for Real Ale (CAMRA) launched a campaign to encourage Fuller's to continue production of the full Gales line at Horndean. However, in January 2006, Fuller's began cutting jobs at the Horndean brewery, and it was announced on 27 February 2006 that the brewery would close at the end of March 2006, although distribution and warehousing would continue in the area.

At that point, production of the Gales brands moved to Fuller's Griffin Brewery in Chiswick, London, with the exception of Gales Bitter which was discontinued.

As of 2017, most of the brewery site has been replaced with apartments and retail shops. The main tower remains standing and was converted alongside the construction of new buildings into apartments.

== Beverages ==
=== Standard Varieties ===
Name	Launched	Discontinued	Notes	ABV	Ref.
HSB	1959	2010's (Bottled)	A premium bitter featuring a sweet fruity flavour, and was the brewery's flagship ale.	4.8%	
Butser	1960s	2006 (Bottled); 2009 (Cask)	A Medium strength bitter beer with a pleasant lightness of touch and good balance. As the name implies, it is named after Butser Hill, and was known as BBB until 1985. After the Fullers takeover, the beverage became exclusive to Fuller's pubs in the South of England, or was available as a seasonal at other Fuller's Pubs. It was discontinued in 2009, alongside much of Gales' other ales.	3.4%	
Prize Old Ale	2022 (revival)	2011 (original)	A yearly range of ales with a unique, fruity flavour from a prolonged maturation and a special brewing process. The last Prize Old Ale was brewed in 2011 and was discontinued. A limited edition variety of ales co-produced with the Marble Brewery in Manchester revived the Prize Old Ale name in 2018. In September 2022, Asahi Breweries announced a new batch of Prize Old Ale that was bottled and put on sale in October 2022 by Fuller's. This new batch was brewed at Dark Star to the original recipe and has been inoculated with beer from the last batch of Prize Old Ale brewed at Gales to ensure identical microorganisms in the fermentation and maturation process.	9.0%	
Festival Mild	1990	2006 (Bottled); Early 2010's (Cask)	A fruity Premium Mild with a complex, bitter palate different to other varieties of this style. It was originally produced for the North Hants and Surrey division of CAMRA, as part of a beer festival that aimed to revive the fortunes of cask mild, and was later sold to the public where it had won many CAMRA awards.	4.8%	
Winter Brew			A Winter Ale with fruity and hoppy flavours. It was very similar to Prize Old Ale in taste and appearance.	4.2%	
Best Bitter		2004	A bitter. It was replaced with the similar but different Gale's Bitter in 2004.	4.0%	
Gale's	2004	2006	A bitter with clean palate, fresh hop aroma and a lemony aftertaste. It was discontinued in 2006, as it shared a similar aftertaste to Fuller's own London Pride and was outsold by the latter.	3.8%	
Seafarers Ale	2009	Early 2010's (Bottles)	An Amber Beer with a spicy hop taste, and contains the Admiral Hop. It was created as part of Fuller's partnership with Seafarers, the leading maritime charity.	3.6% (Cask); 4.2% (Bottle)	
Swing Low	2007	2010	A Bitter. It was made to promote the UK Rugby Seasons. It was later re-released and rebranded as a Fuller's branded product.	3.8%	
Summer Breeze	2007	2011	A bottle-exclusive classic, golden, summer ale. It was originally released as a Summer Limited Edition in 2007 and 2008. It was re-released for the Sainsbury's Summer Ale Compotition in 2011.	3.8%	
Spring Sprinter	2011		A light ale with a gooseberry taste, and has been sold every springtime since 2011. It is only available in Casks.	3.8%	
Beachcomber	2014	2018	A light ale with lemon and grapefruit flavours. It was sold as a Cask-exclusive for an assortment of summer seasons.	3.7%	
Firecracker	2014	2016	A Spicy Winter Ale sold during the holiday season. Cask-exclusive.	4.8%	
Redwood	2015	2016	A Red Ale with a passion fruit and berry flavour. Cask-exclusive.	4.0%	

- Gales Light Ale
- Other discontinued draught & keg (CO_{2} pressured) beers *XXX Light Mild, *XXXD Dark Mild, *777 Keg Mild, *Gales Keg Bitter
- Other discontinued bottled beers *Nut Brown

== Limited Edition Brews ==
- Last Drop = The last ale brewed at the Gales Brewery before its closure in 2006.
- Gales Trafalgar 200 = Was first brewed in 2005 to celebrate the bicentenary of Nelson's famous victory.
- Gales Clubhouse Bitter =
- Gales Crowning Glory = Was brewed to celebrate the Queen's Golden Jubilee in 2002.
- Gales Millennium Brew = Was brewed to celebrate the new millennium in 2000.
- Gales Conquest Ale
- Gales D-Day Ale
- Gales Silver Jubilee Ale = Was brewed to celebrate the Queen's Silver Jubilee in 1977
- Gales Royal Wedding Ale = Was brewed to celebrate the 1981 Royal Wedding.
- Gales Portsmouth 800 Ale = Was brewed to celebrate the 800th anniversary of Portsmouth in 1994.
- Gales Golden Jubilee Ale = Was brewed to celebrate the Queen's Golden Jubilee in 2002.
- Gales Victory Ale
- Gales Vanguard Ale
- Gales Forgotten Fleet = Limited brew in 1995 to commemorate the 50th anniversary of the British Pacific Fleet & East Indies Fleet

== Links ==
- Media related to Gale's Brewery at Wikimedia Commons
- Data related to Gales Brewery at Wikidata
