= Darwin Brewery =

Brewery in Sunderland, Tyne and Wear, England

- Location: North Shields, England
- Opened: 1994

Darwin Brewery is a North Shields based brewery which opened in 1994 and expanded in 2002.

Originally a brewing school of the University of Sunderland with an 18-gallon plant, the demand for the beers that were brewed there spurred an expansion and full commercialisation.

In 1997, Darwin acquired Hodges Brewery in Crook, County Durham, and used the premises as the main brewing plant until the 2002 expansion into their current premises in Hendon, Sunderland.

In 2022 Darwin Brewery moved to a new site in North Shields, sharing premises with Three Kings Brewery.

== Beers brewed ==
Current:

- Beagle 4.1%
- Evolution Bitter 4.0%
- Expedition Pale Ale 3.8%
- Rolling Hitch IPA 5.2%
- Tall Ship Lager 4.1%
- Chocolate & Vanilla Stout 5.0%

Historic:

- Darwin Bitter (abv 3.6%)
- Sunderland Best (abv 3.9%)
- Evolution Ale (abv 4.0%)
- Durham Light Ale (abv 4.0%)
- Richmond Ale (abv 4.5%)
- Saint's Sinner (abv 5.0%)
- Rolling Hitch (abv 5.2%) ASDA BEER FESTIVAL CHAMPION 2005
- Killer Bee (abv 6.0%)
- Original Flag Porter (abv 5.0%)
- Hop Drop (abv 5.3%) TESCO BEER CHALLENGE WINNER 2005
