= Great British Beer Festival =

Annual beer festival in the United Kingdom

Coordinates: 51°29′47″N 0°12′35″W

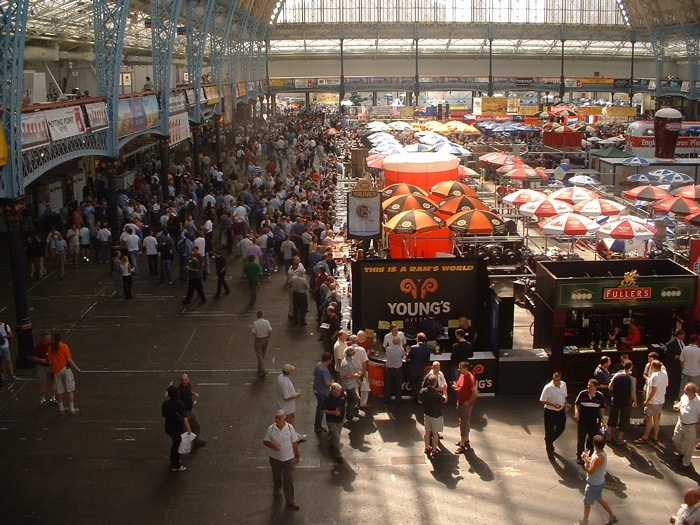
GBBF 2004, Olympia, London

The Great British Beer Festival (sometimes abbreviated as GBBF) is an annual beer festival organised by the Campaign for Real Ale (CAMRA). It presents a selection of cask ales, and the Champion Beer of Britain awards, and is held in August of each year. GBBF's sister festival, the Great British Beer Festival Winter, is held in February each year.

== Description ==
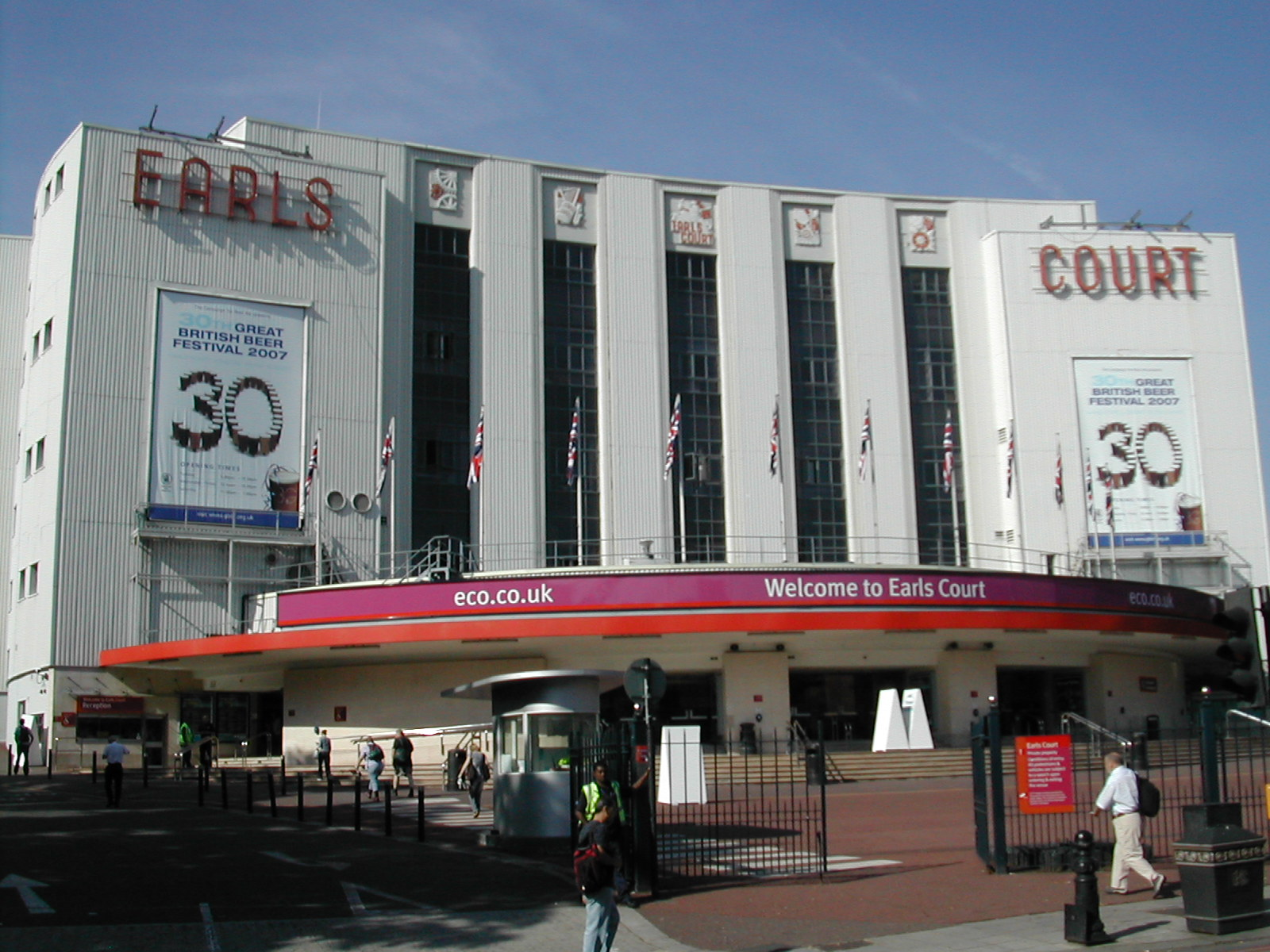
Earls Court exterior, GBBF 2007

Great British Beer Festival is styled as the "biggest pub in the world" and offers around 900 different beverages, at least 450 of which are beers from British breweries, as well as around 200 foreign beers from countries including Belgium, Germany and the USA, as well traditional British cider and perry. The festival is staffed by unpaid volunteers, around 1,000 of whom work at the festival.

The festival is usually held during the first full week in August and runs from Tuesday to Saturday. The Tuesday afternoon session is only open to the trade and press, with the Champion Beer of Britain award winners being announced mid-afternoon. The general public are admitted to afternoon and evening sessions from Tuesday evening until Saturday evening. CAMRA figures show that in 2006, over 66,000 people visited the festival over the course of the week and consumed some 350,000 pints of beer — one pint sold in less than half of every open second. Part of the huge improvement on 2005 (ticket sales were up 40%) was attributed by the festival organiser, Marc Holmes, to the move from Olympia to Earls Court, a much larger and easily accessible venue. Since 2012 the event has returned to Olympia and remains massively popular.

As well as the beer, the festival offers entertainment such as live music and traditional pub games, as well as a variety of food stands.

== Event history ==
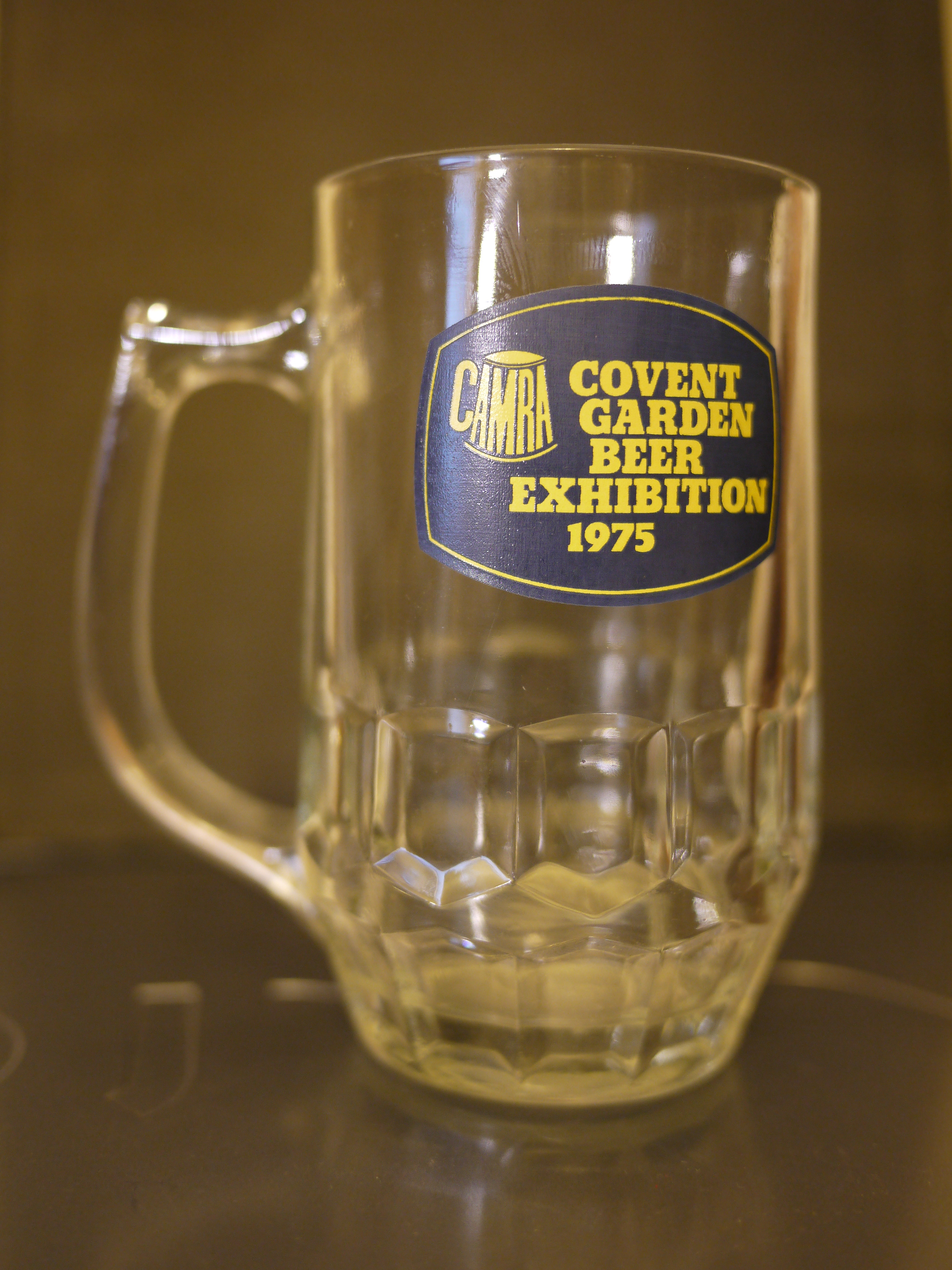
CAMRA glass from the 1975 festival

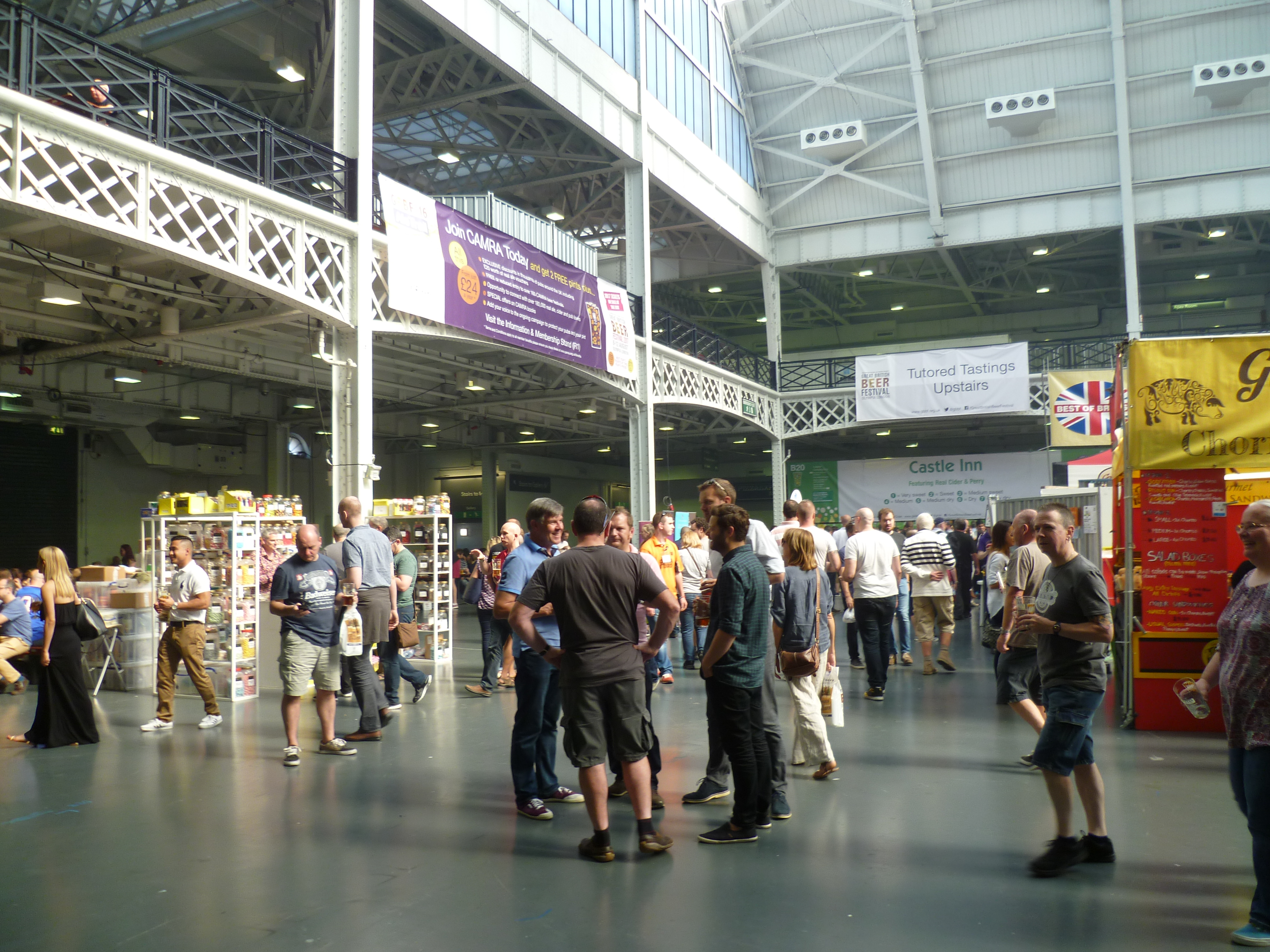
GBBF 2016, Olympia, London

CAMRA held their first large beer festival in Covent Garden, London in September 1975. It was a 4-day event that attracted 40,000 people who drank 150,000 pints of real ale. Strictly speaking it was not a GBBF, but it has been considered the forerunner of the festival. The first "proper" GBBF was held in 1977 at Alexandra Palace. The venue has moved between cities since it was first established but has settled in London since 1991. The only years in which a festival was not held were 1984, 2020 and 2021, due to a fire at the venue and the COVID-19 pandemic respectively. CAMRA announced that no festival will take place in 2024 due to renovations at Olympia and the lack of a suitable alternative venue.

Year	Location	Notes	Ref.
1977–1980	Alexandra Palace, London	Held in tents in 1980 after the Palace burnt down.	
1981–1982	Queens Hall, Leeds	Festival held outside London for the first time.	
1983	Bingley Hall, Birmingham		
1984	–	No event held.	
1985–1987	Metropole, Brighton		
1988–1989	Queens Hall, Leeds		
1990	Metropole, Brighton		
1991	Docklands Arena, London		
1992–2005	Olympia, London		
2006–2011	Earls Court, London	2007 event celebrated as the 30th anniversary of the festival. 66,900 people attended in 2010. 62,446 people attended in 2011.	
2012–2023	Olympia, London	2020 and 2021 events cancelled due to COVID-19 pandemic.	
2024	–	Cancelled due to venue selection difficulties / availability.	
2025	National Exhibition Centre, Marston Green		
2026	–	Cancelled for financial reasons.	
