= Shepherd Neame Brewery =

Brewery in Faversham, England

- Type: Private limited company
- Traded as: AQSE: SHEP
- Industry: Brewing, Public houses, Hotels, Beer, Alcoholic beverages
- Founded: 1698; 328 years ago
- Founder: Richard Marsh
- Headquarters: Faversham, Kent, England
- Key people: Jonathan Neame (Chief Executive)
- Products: Beer
- Production output: 180,000 imperial barrels (290,000 hl) (2020)
- Revenue: ▲£172.3 million (2024)
- Operating income: ▲£14.0 million (2024)
- Number of employees: 1,727 (2025)

Shepherd Neame is an English independent brewery which has been based in the market town of Faversham, Kent, for over 300 years. While 1698 is the brewery's official established date, town records show that commercial brewing has occurred on the site since 1573. Since the brewery's formation in the 16th century, ownership has passed in unbroken succession through five families. The brewery produces a range of cask ales and filtered beers. Production is around 180,000 brewers' barrels a year (180,000 imp bbl (29,000,000 L; 6,500,000 imp gal; 7,800,000 US gal)). It has 286 pubs and hotels in South East England, predominantly in Kent and London. The company exports to 44 countries.

== History ==
Shepherd Neame has traditionally dated the founding of the brewery to 1698, when, after responding to an advertisement in the Kentish Gazette for 11 April 1865, Richard Marsh acquired the business and the building. Further research reveals that the brewery had existed on the same site, 18 Court Street, Faversham, since 1570, or 1573, depending on sources.

Richard Marsh lived until 1727, when his brewery was bequeathed to his widow and then to his daughter, who sold the property to Samuel Shepherd around 1741. Samuel Shepherd was from Deal, Kent. He was interested in malting when he moved to Faversham around 1730 and established himself as a Brewer of Malt by 1734. Shepherd expanded on his interest by acquiring several public houses. However, his son, Julius Shepherd, extended this trend further upon his inheritance of the brewery in 1770 when the company held four such outlets. In 1789, he set about modernising the process of malt grinding and pumping, which had been previously worked with the employment of horses, by introducing what was reputed to be the first steam engine (Boulton and Watt) to be used for this purpose outside London. He was then able to describe his business as the Faversham Steam Brewery.

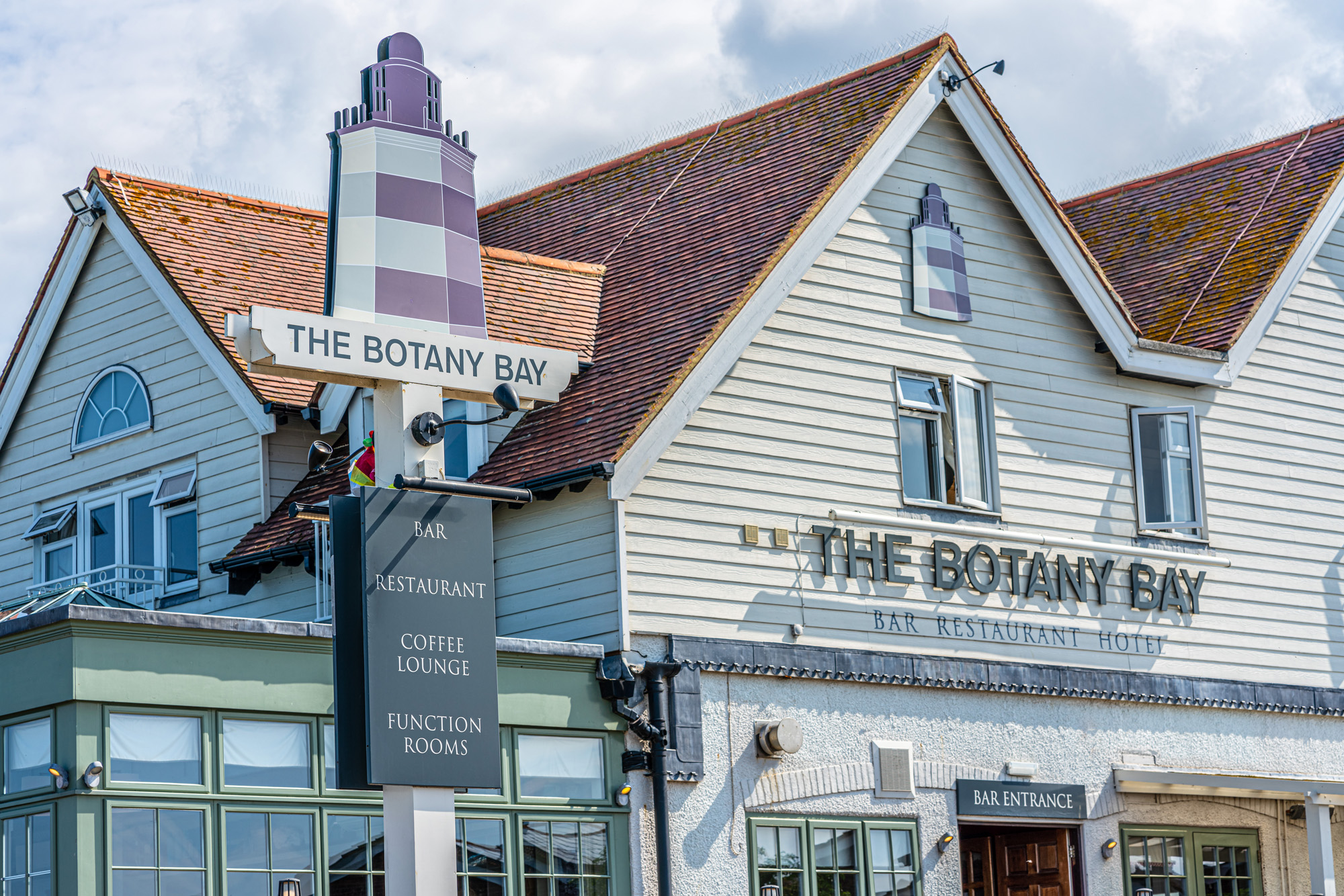
The Botany Bay, Broadstairs

Henry, his second son, born in 1780, continued the family tradition and raised his son of the same name into the business. It was this Henry Shepherd (1816–77) who was to be the last of the Shepherds actively involved in the company. The death of Henry senior at the age of eighty-two occurred in 1862. Although his son was not a businessman of the same determination, the firm's expansion continued adequately with John Mares, who had come to the financial assistance of the Shepherd Brewery during the recession of the mid-1840s and continued as the impetus behind Shepherd and Mares until Percy Beale Neame joined the brewery in 1864.

The Neame family were relative latecomers in the overall development of the Shepherd Neame Brewery. Still, as substantial property owners in the district, Charles Neame of Harefield Court and John Neame of Selling Court were acknowledged to be among the most valuable hop growers in East Kent. Theo Barker explains in the official account of the brewery that it all began with a Captain Richard Marsh, who in 1678 is recorded in the Faversham Wardmote Books as contributing by far the largest of the 'Brewers Fines' made at that date.

Mares had seen the potential of the brewery's growth with the arrival of the long-delayed railway service in 1858. He pressed the firm to prepare for such growth actively. Horse-drawn drays were used to carry the brewery's ales throughout Kent, and malts were imported by barge at Faversham Creek at its wharf, which was also used as the means to deliver its product to London until the 1850s when steamboats were beginning to prove more expeditious to the task. The railways soon even outpaced and replaced the steamboats.

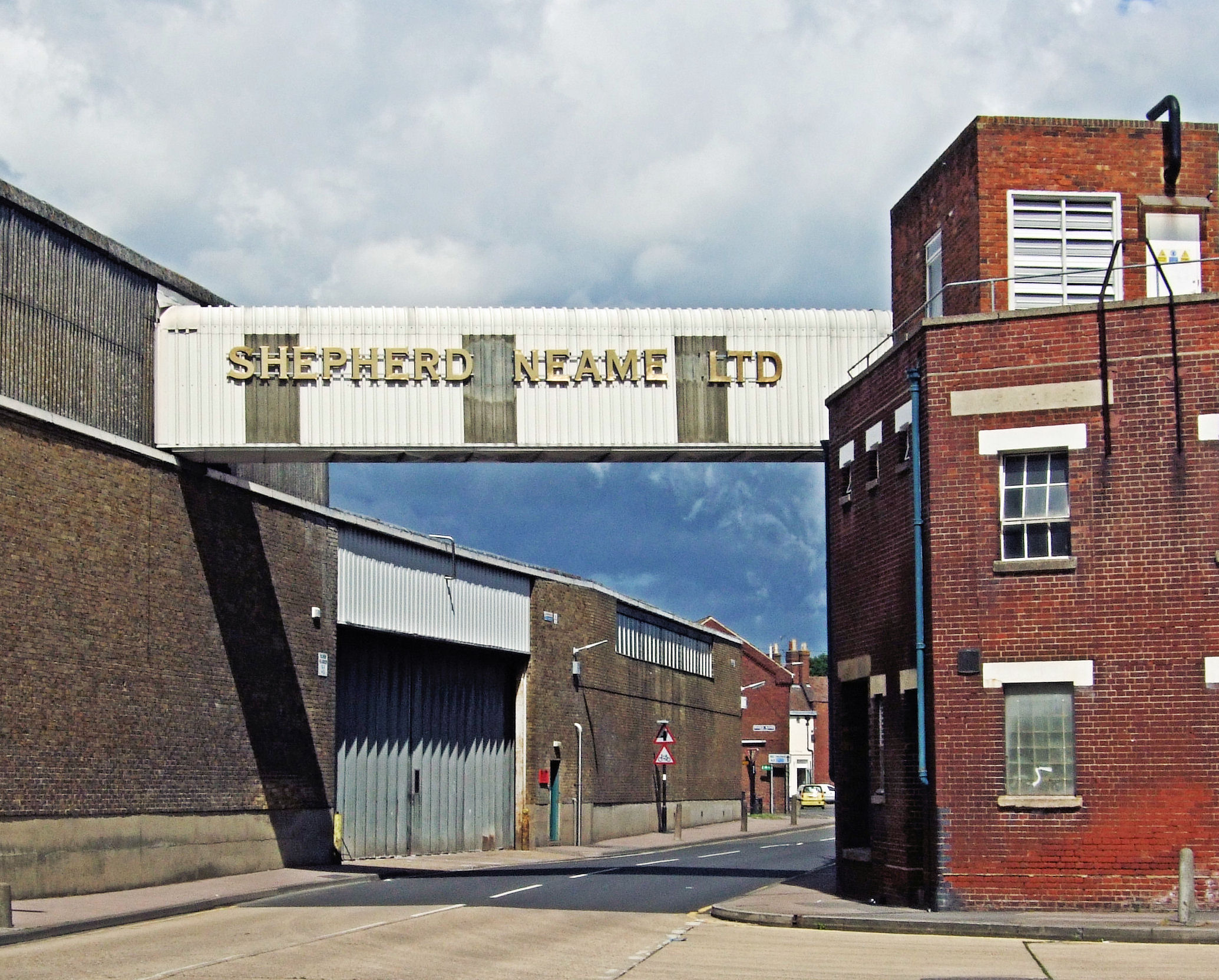
Shepherd Neame bridge in Faversham

Mares's unexpected death at the age of 45 in 1864 placed Percy Neame, at the age of 28, as the stronger partner with Henry Shepherd, and with the challenge left to him in Mares's successful expansion programme he brought the Faversham Brewery well into the Neame family's dominion. Jonathan Neame is the fifth generation of his family to run the business. His father, Robert, was the company's first-ever President.

Shepherd Neame has embraced 21st-century brewing techniques, for instance, using PDX Reactor Technology for the heat treatment of wort, rather than the traditional method, using a calandria. This has led to a reduction in energy consumption of 50%. Its cask, keg, and bottling lines are all equally high tech, utilising robotics and the latest SAP software to minimise the use of natural resources, while maximising beer quality. Its cardboard packaging is 100% recyclable, and the brewery uses lightweight glass for bottled beer. It also installed a new state-of-the-art Yeast Propagation Plant, which will reduce energy consumption. The brewery has repeatedly pioneered sustainable brewing methods. It recycles 97% of the grain and hops used in the brewing process as animal feed on local farms and holds a Feed Materials Assurance Scheme certificate. Waste is separated into recyclable elements, and the waste oil from its managed pubs and the brewery's kitchens is collected and converted into biofuel. Its Water Recovery Plant, installed in 2014, allows the wastewater from brewing and cleaning to be recycled rather than sent to the drain.Along with the Three Tuns Brewery in Shropshire, Shepherd Neame claims to be the oldest brewery in Great Britain. Three Tuns was licensed in 1642, 56 years earlier than Shepherd Neame. However, there is evidence that brewing has taken place on the Shepherd Neame site since at least 1573, over a century before the establishment of the current brewery.

== Brewing and product range ==
The brewery uses chalk-filtered mineral water from the brewery's artesian well, deep below the brewery, and 93% of the hops used in its beers are grown in Kent. In 2016, the 100 year-old solid teak mash tuns were renovated.

As well as its own branded beer, it also brews Thai Singha lager under licence and collaborates to produce Orchard View Apple Cider. and Angry Orchard Crisp Apple cider.

Shepherd Neame beers are available in UK supermarkets.
