= Campaign for Real Ale =

British consumer organization

Coordinates: 51.7518°N 0.3141°W

- Formation: 1971; 55 years ago
- Type: Consumer organisation
- Headquarters: Luton
- Location: United Kingdom
- Members: ▼140,900 (Mar 2026)
- Official language: English
- Chief Executive: Tom Stainer
- Key people: Ash Corbett-Collins (Chairman); Gillian Hough (Vice Chairman)
- Revenue: ▼£8.6 million (2024)
- Employees: ▲49 (2024)
- Volunteers: 7,000 (2025)
- Website: camra.org.uk

The Campaign for Real Ale (CAMRA) is an independent voluntary consumer organisation headquartered in Luton, which promotes real ale, cider and perry and traditional British pubs and clubs.

== History ==
The organisation was founded on 16 March 1971 in Kruger's Bar, Dunquin, County Kerry, Ireland, by Michael Hardman, Graham Lees, Jim Makin, and Bill Mellor, who were opposed to the growing mass production of beer and the homogenisation of the British brewing industry. The original name was the Campaign for the Revitalisation of Ale. Following the formation of the Campaign, the first annual general meeting took place in 1972, at the Rose Inn in Coton Road, Nuneaton.

Early membership consisted of the four founders and their friends. Interest in CAMRA and its objectives spread rapidly, with 5,000 members signed up by 1973. Other early influential members included Christopher Hutt, author of Death of the English Pub, who succeeded Hardman as chairman, Frank Baillie, author of The Beer Drinker's Companion, and later succeeded by frequent Good Beer Guide editor, Roger Protz.

In 1991, CAMRA had 30,000 members across the UK and abroad and, a year later, helped to launch the European Beer Consumers Union. In December 2022, CAMRA issued guidelines advising volunteers to avoid terms like "pub crawl" or "few beers with the lads" in order to promote a more inclusive drinking culture. The guidelines also discouraged "lad culture" and emphasised the need for "inclusive banter." This move generated public debate, including criticism from Conservative MP Bob Blackman, who questioned the necessity of such changes.

In 2023, the White Hart Inn in Grays, Essex (winner of South West Essex CAMRA Pub of the Year in 2007, 2008, 2009, 2011, 2015, 2017, 2019 and 2020) was banned from being considered for awards and excluded from the Good Beer Guide after displaying golliwog dolls. CAMRA stated that pubs should not display material considered offensive under its inclusivity guidelines.

At the 2025 AGM, CAMRA reported that it was facing significant financial strain. Membership had fallen to a six-year low, recruitment had stalled, and the organisation failed to return to pre-COVID levels.

== Activities ==
CAMRA's campaigns include promoting small brewing and pub businesses, reforming licensing laws, reducing tax on beer, and stopping continued consolidation among local British brewers. It also makes an effort to promote less common varieties of beer, including stout, porter, and mild, as well as traditional cider and perry.

CAMRA's states that real ale should be served without the use of additional carbonation. This means that "any beer brand which is produced in both cask and keg versions" is not admitted to CAMRA festivals if the brewery's marketing is deemed to imply an equivalence of quality or character between the two versions.

== Organisation ==
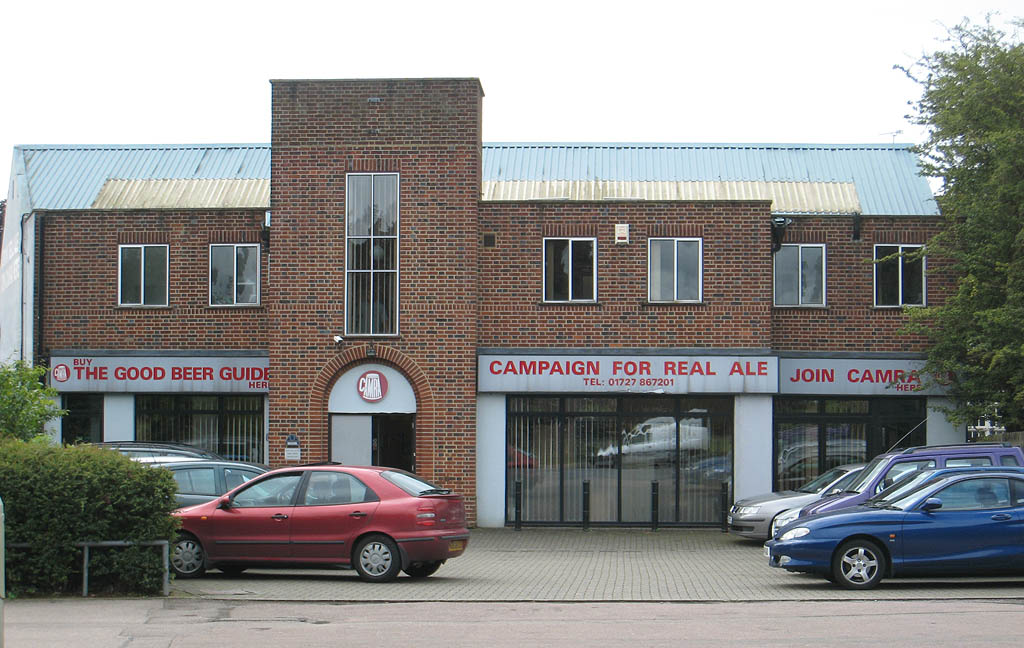
The former CAMRA office building in St Albans

CAMRA is organised on a federal basis, over 200 local branches, each covering a particular geographical area of the UK, that contribute to the central body of the organisation based in Luton. It is governed by a National Executive, made up of 12 voluntary unpaid directors elected by the membership. The local branches are grouped into 16 regions across the UK, such as the West Midlands or Wessex.

=== Publications ===
CAMRA publishes the Good Beer Guide, an annually compiled directory of the best 4,500 real ale outlets and listing of real ale brewers. CAMRA members received a monthly newspaper called What's Brewing until its April 2021 issue and there is a quarterly colour magazine called Beer. It also maintains a National Inventory of Historic Pub Interiors to help bring greater recognition and protection to Britain's most historic pubs. In 2025, the printed winter edition of Beer Magazine was not distributed for reasons of financial austerity. It was published online only.

In addition to the Good Beer Guide, Camra published Good Cider Guide between 1996–2005, listing cider and perry outlets and producers in the United Kingdom. The intention of the book is to be a "guide for real cider-loving connoisseurs". The last edition, published in 2005, contains details of over 550 cider outlets (pubs, clubs and off licences), and claims to include every producer in the UK. Producers and outlets are listed separately by county with maps and full directions, and there are also articles about cider and perry history, cider and perry making, and cider abroad.

=== Festivals ===
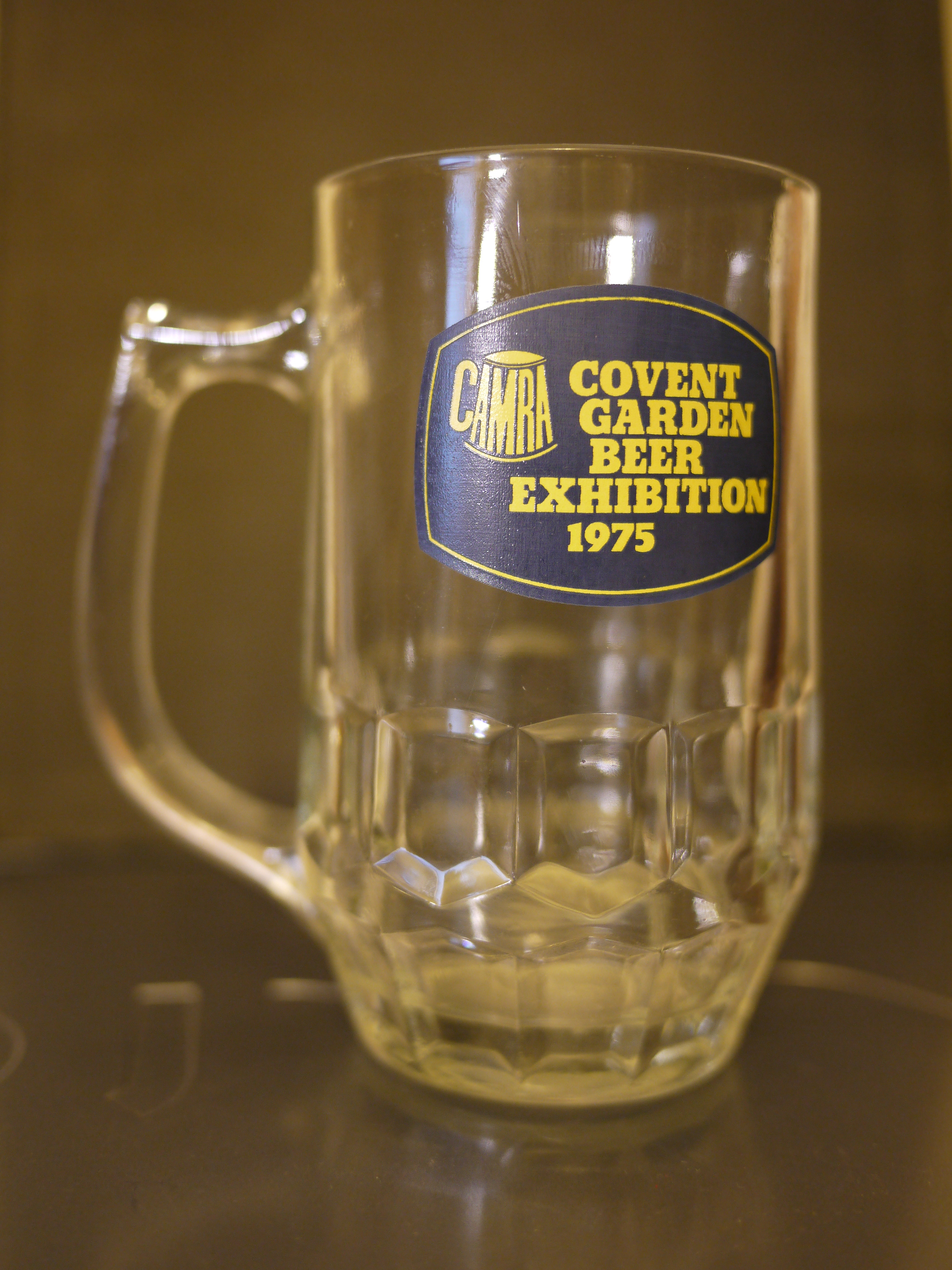
First National CAMRA Beer Festival held at Covent Garden, London, 1975

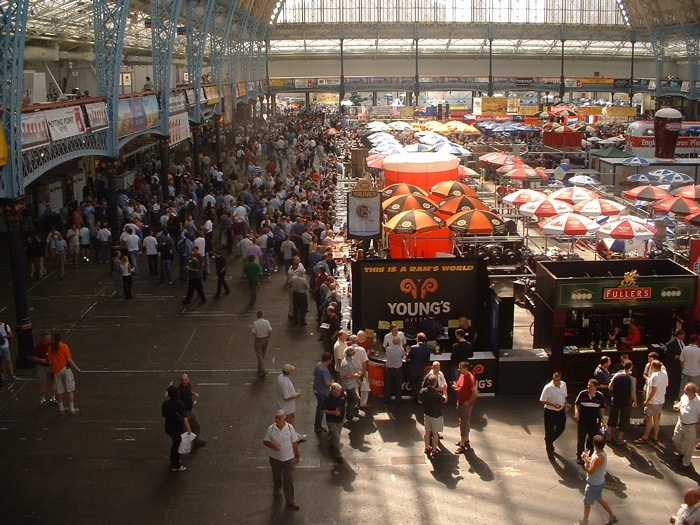
Great British Beer Festival 2004

CAMRA supports and promotes beer and cider festivals around the country, which are organised by local CAMRA branches. Generally, each festival charges an entry fee which either covers entry only or also includes a commemorative glass showing the details of the festival. A festival programme is usually also provided, with a list and description of the drinks available. Members may get discounted entrance to CAMRA festivals.

The Campaign also organises the annual Great British Beer Festival in August. It is now held in the Great, National & West Halls at the Olympia Exhibition Centre, in Kensington, London, having been held for a few years at Earl's Court as well as regionally in the past at venues such as Brighton and Leeds. This is the UK's largest beer festival, with over 900 beers, ciders and perries available over the week long event.

For many years, CAMRA also organised the National Winter Ales Festival. However, in 2017 this was re-branded as the Great British Beer Festival Winter where they award the Champion Winter Beer of Britain. Unlike the Great British Beer Festival, the Winter event does not have a permanent venue and is rotated throughout the country every three years. Recent hosts have been Derby and Norwich, with the event currently held each February in Birmingham. In 2020 CAMRA also launched the Great Welsh Beer Festival, to be held in Cardiff in April.

In October 2024, CAMRA announced the relocation of the Great British Beer Festival from London to Birmingham, ending its 34-year run in the capital. Attendance at the new venue had failed to meet expectations resulting in a substantial loss. CAMRA announced that the GBBF and its Winter Festival would not take place in 2026.

=== Awards ===
CAMRA presents awards for beers and pubs, such as the National Pub of the Year. The competition begins in the preceding year with branches choosing their local pub of the year through either a ballot or a panel of judges. The branch winners are entered into 16 regional competitions which are then visited by several individuals who agree the best using a scoring system that considers beer quality, aesthetic and welcome. The four finalists are announced each year before a ceremony to crown the winner in the spring. There are also the Pub Design Awards, which are held in association with English Heritage and the Victorian Society. These comprise several categories, including new build, refurbished and converted pubs.

The best known CAMRA award is the Champion Beer of Britain, which is selected at the Great British Beer Festival. Other awards include the Champion Beer of Scotland and the Champion Beer of Wales.

=== National Beer Scoring Scheme ===
CAMRA developed the National Beer Scoring Scheme (NBSS) as an easy-to-use scheme for judging beer quality in pubs, to assist CAMRA branches in selecting pubs for the Good Beer Guide. CAMRA members input their beer scores online via WhatPub or through the Good Beer Guide app.

=== Pub heritage ===
The CAMRA Pub Heritage Group identifies, records and helps to protect pub interiors of historic and/or architectural importance, and seeks to get them listed.

The group maintains two inventories of Heritage pubs, the National Inventory (NI), which contains only those pubs that have been maintained in their original condition (or have been modified very little) for at least thirty years, but usually since at least World War II. The second, larger, inventory is the Regional Inventory (RI), which is broken down by county and contains both those pubs listed in the NI and other pubs that are not eligible for the NI, for reasons such as having been overly modified, but are still considered historically important, or have particular architectural value.

=== LocAle ===
The LocAle scheme was launched in 2007 to promote locally brewed beers. The scheme functions slightly differently in each area, and is managed by each branch, but each is similar: if the beer is to be promoted as a LocAle it must come from a brewery within a predetermined number of miles set by each CAMRA branch, generally around 20, although the North London branch has set it at 30 miles from brewery to pub, even if it comes from a distribution centre further away; in addition, each participating pub must keep at least one LocAle for sale at all times.

=== Investment club ===
CAMRA members may join the CAMRA Members' Investment Club which, since 1989, has invested in real ale breweries and pub chains. As of January 2021 the club had over 3,000 members and owned investments worth over £17 million. Although all investors must be CAMRA members, the CAMRA Members' Investment Club is not part of CAMRA Ltd.

== See also ==
- Real Ale Twats
- Society of Independent Brewers
- Society for the Preservation of Beers from the Wood
- Independent Family Brewers of Britain
- European Beer Consumers' Union
