= Beer in England =

Cask ale handpumps

Beer has been brewed in England for thousands of years. As a beer brewing country, it is known for top fermented cask beer (also called real ale) which finishes maturing in the cellar of the pub rather than at the brewery and is served with only natural carbonation.

English beer styles include bitter, mild, brown ale and old ale. Stout, porter and India pale ale were also originally brewed in London. Lager increased in popularity from the mid-20th century. Other modern developments include the consolidation of large brewers into multinational corporations; the growth of beer consumerism; and the expansion of microbreweries and bottle-conditioned beers.

== History ==
=== Romano-Celtic Britain ===
Brewing in what is now England was probably well established when the Romans arrived in 54 BC, and certainly continued under them.

In the 1980s, archaeologists found the evidence that Rome's soldiers in Britain sustained themselves on Celtic ale. A series of domestic and military accounts written on wooden tablets were dug up at the Roman fort of Vindolanda, at Chesterholm in modern Northumberland, dating to between AD90 and AD130. They reveal the garrison at Vindolanda buying ceruese, or beer, as the legions doubtless did throughout the rest of Roman Britain, almost certainly from brewers in the local area.

One list of accounts from Vindolanda mentions Atrectus the brewer (Atrectus cervesarius), the first named brewer in British history, as well as the first known professional brewer in Britain. The accounts also show purchases of bracis or braces, that is, emmer wheat (or malt), doubtless for brewing. Quite possibly the garrison bought the malt, and hired a local brewer to make beer from it for the troops.

In Roman Britain, brewing, both domestic and retail, must have been widespread: remains indicating the existence of Roman-era malting or brewing operations have been found from Somerset to Northumberland, and South Wales to Colchester. In the third and fourth centuries AD Roman hypocaust technology, for supplying central heating to homes, was adapted in Britain to build permanent corn dryers/maltings, and the remains of these double-floored buildings, with underground flues, are found in Roman towns as well as on Roman farms.

British brewing is generally thought to have been part of a wider Celtic tradition. Since this was well before the introduction of hops, other flavourings such as honey, meadowsweet (Filipendula ulmaria) and mugwort (Artemisia vulgaris) may have been used.

=== Middle Ages: Ale-wands, ale-wives and ale-conners ===
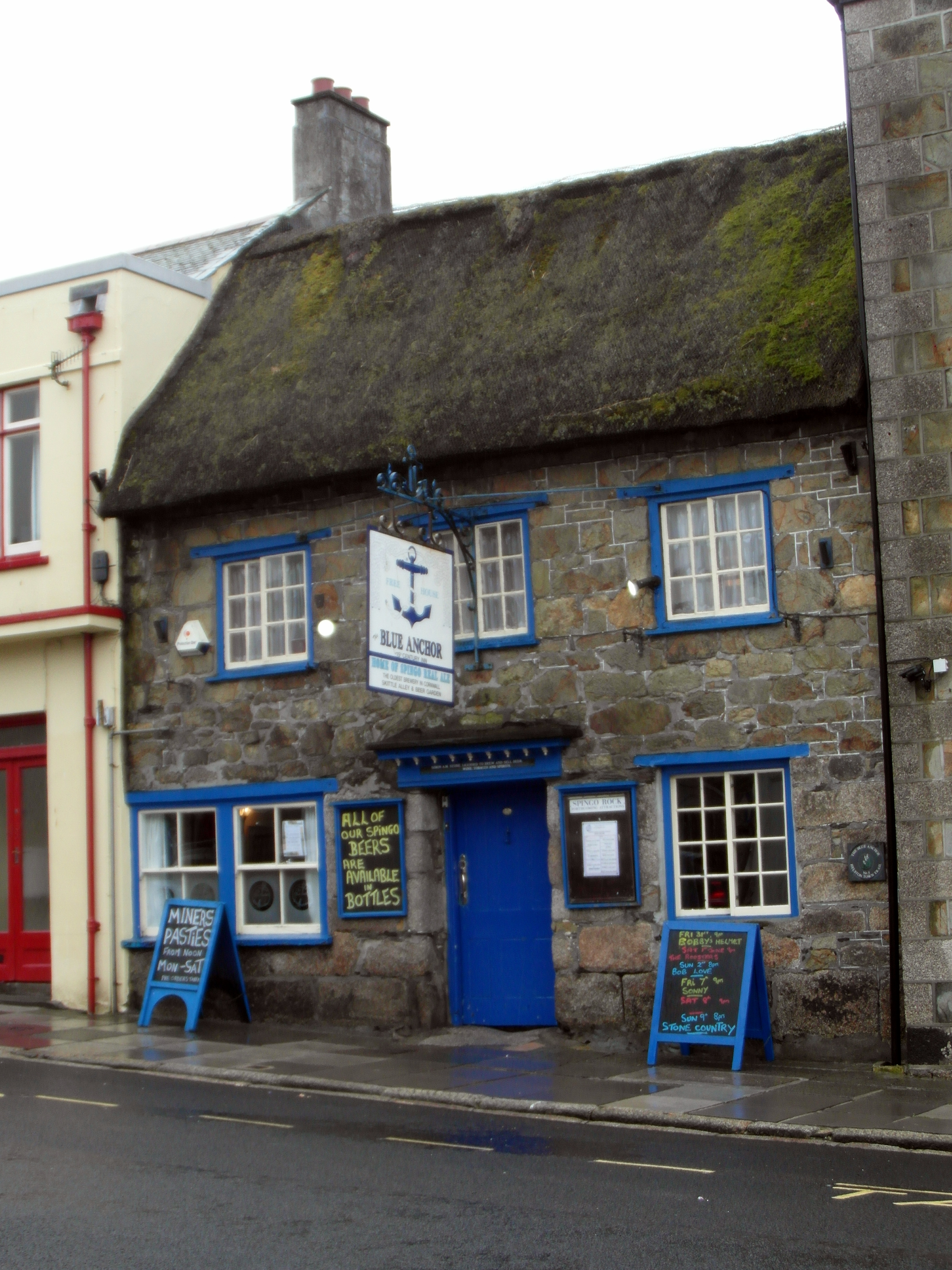
The Blue Anchor, a 15th-century brew pub in Helston, Cornwall

Beer was one of the most common drinks during the Middle Ages. It was consumed daily by all social classes in the northern and eastern parts of Europe where grape cultivation was difficult or impossible. Beer provided a considerable amount of the daily calories in the northern regions. In England, the per capita consumption was 275–300 liters (60–66 gallons) a year by the Late Middle Ages, and beer was drunk with every meal.

In the Middle Ages, ale would have been brewed on the premises from which it was sold. Alewives would put out an ale-wand to show when their beer was ready. The medieval authorities were more interested in ensuring adequate quality and strength of the beer than discouraging drinking. Gradually, men became involved in brewing and organised themselves into guilds such as the Brewers Guild in London. As brewing became more organised and reliable, many inns and taverns ceased brewing for themselves and bought beer from these early commercial breweries.

An ale-conner, sometimes "aleconner", was an officer appointed yearly at the court-leet of ancient English communities to ensure the goodness and wholesomeness of bread, ale, and beer. There were many different names for this position, which varied from place to place: "ale-tasters", gustatores cervisiae, "ale-founders", and "ale-conners". Ale-conners were often trusted to ensure that the beer was sold at a fair price. Historically, four ale-conners were chosen annually by the Common Hall of the City.

It is sometimes said that:

The Ale Conner was a type of early tax-man whose job it was to test the quality and strength of beer, not by quaffing, but by sitting in a puddle of it! They travelled from pub to pub clad in sturdy leather britches. Beer was poured on a wooden bench and the Conner sat in it. Depending on how sticky they felt it to be when they stood up, they were able to assess its alcoholic strength and impose the appropriate duty.

However, the accuracy of the colourful legend is doubtful.

=== 1400–1699: Rise of hopped beer ===
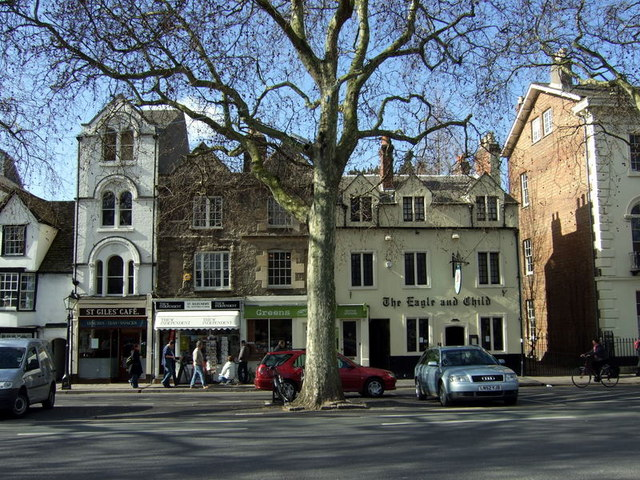
The Eagle and Child, a 17th-century pub in Oxford

The use of hops in beer was written of as early as 822 by a Carolingian Abbot. Flavouring beer with hops was known at least as early as the 9th century, but was only gradually adopted because of difficulties in establishing the right proportions of ingredients. Before that, a mix of various herbs called gruit had been used, but did not have the same conserving properties as hops.

In The Book of Margery Kempe, Margery dictates her story to a scribe, and reports that in the early 15th century she attempted to brew beer in Bishop's Lynn, Norfolk, and makes other references to bottles of beer.

In the 15th century, an unhopped beer would have been known as an ale, while the use of hops would make it a beer. Hopped beer was imported to England from the Netherlands as early as 1400 in Winchester, and hops were being planted in England by 1428. At the time, ale and beer brewing were carried out separately, no brewer being allowed to produce both. The Brewers Company of London stated "no hops, herbs, or other like thing be put into any ale or liquore wherof ale shall be made – but only liquor (water), malt, and yeast." This comment is sometimes misquoted as a prohibition on hopped beer. However, hopped beer was opposed by some, e.g.

Ale is made of malte and water; and they the which do put any other thynge to ale than is rehersed, except yest, barme, or goddesgood [three words for yeast], doth sophysticat there ale. Ale for an Englysshe man is a naturall drinke. Ale muste haue these properties, it muste be fresshe and cleare, it muste not be ropy, nor smoky, nor it must haue no wefte nor tayle. Ale shulde not be dronke vnder.v.[5] dayes olde .... Barly malte maketh better ale than Oten malte or any other corne doth ... Beere is made of malte, of hoppes, and water; it is a naturall drynke for a doche [Dutch] man, and nowe of late dayes [recently] it is moche vsed in Englande to the detryment of many Englysshe men ... for the drynke is a colde drynke. Yet it doth make a man fatte, and doth inflate the bely, as it doth appere by the doche mennes faces and belyes.

A survey in 1577 of drinking establishment in England and Wales for taxation purposes recorded 14,202 alehouses, 1,631 inns, and 329 taverns, representing one pub for every 187 people.

=== 1700–1899: Industry and empire ===
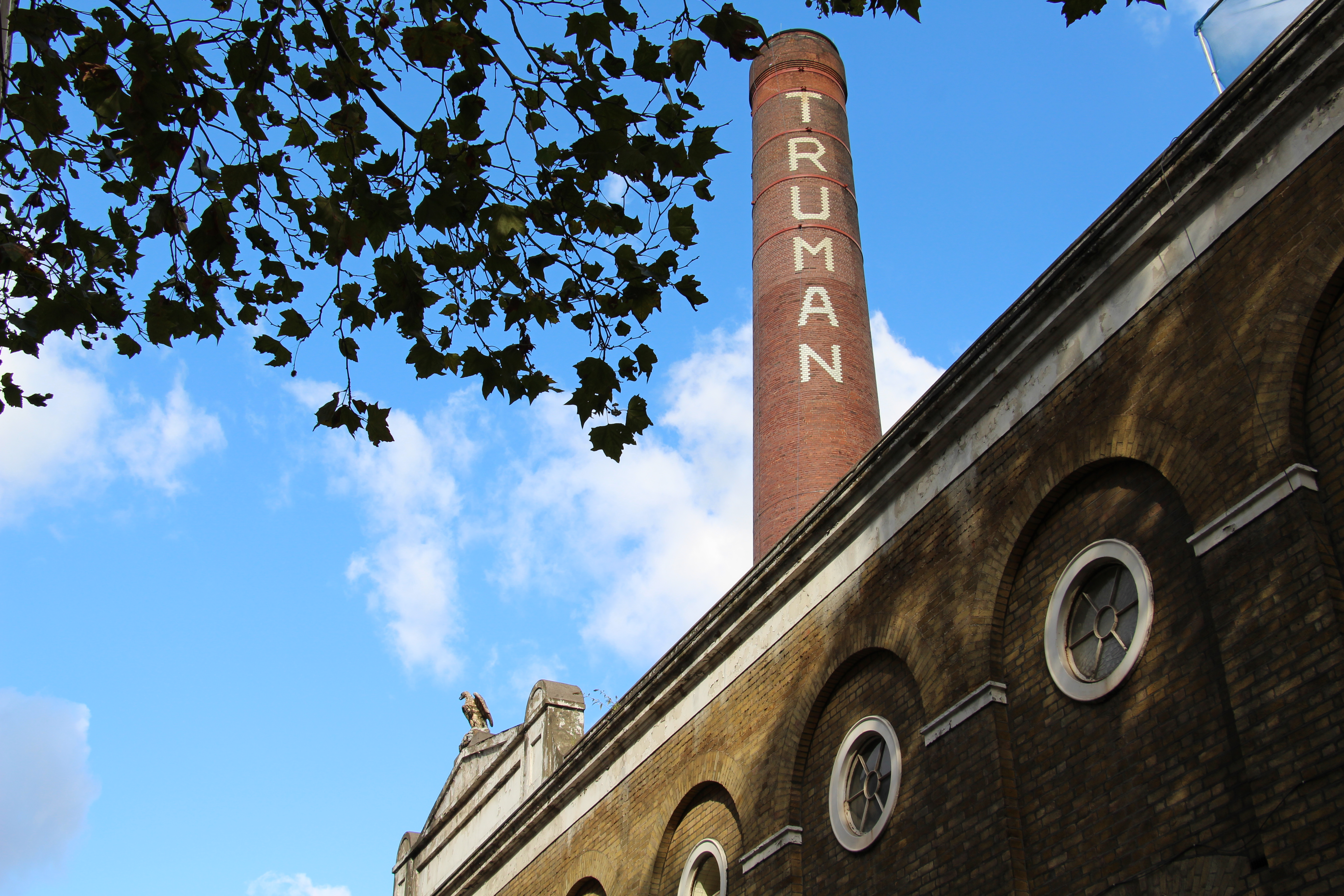
Truman's Brewery at Brick Lane in East London

The early 18th century saw the development of a popular new style of dark beer in London: porter. Before 1700, London brewers sent out their beer very young and any aging was either performed by the publican or a dealer. Porter was the first beer to be aged at the brewery and despatched in a condition fit to be drunk immediately. It was the first beer that could be made on any large scale, and the London porter brewers, such as Whitbread, Truman, Parsons and Thrale, achieved great success financially.

The large London porter breweries pioneered many technological advances, such as the construction of large storage vats, the use of the thermometer (about 1760), the hydrometer (1770), and attemperators (about 1780).

The 18th century also saw the development of India pale ale. Among the earliest known named brewers whose beers were exported to India was George Hodgson of the Bow Brewery,

The late 18th century saw a system of progressive taxation based on the strength of beer in terms of cost of ingredients, leading to three distinct gradations: "table", "small" and "strong" beer. Mixing these types was used as a way of achieving variation, and sometimes avoiding taxation, and remained popular for more than a century afterwards.

The beer engine (a simple lift-pump), a device for manually pumping beer from a container in a pub's basement or cellar, was invented by Joseph Bramah in 1797. The bar-mounted pump handle, with its changeable pump clip indicating the beer on offer remains a familiar and characteristic sight in most English pubs. Before the beer engine, beer was generally poured into jugs in the cellar or tap room and carried into the serving area.

The Beerhouse Act 1830 enabled anyone to brew and sell beer, ale or cider, whether from a public house or their own homes, upon obtaining a moderately priced licence of just under £2 for beer and ale and £1 for cider, without recourse to obtaining them from justices of the peace, as was previously required. The result was the opening of hundreds of new pubs throughout England, and the reduction of the influence of the large breweries. One of the motivations of the Act was to reduce the abusive over-consumption of gin.

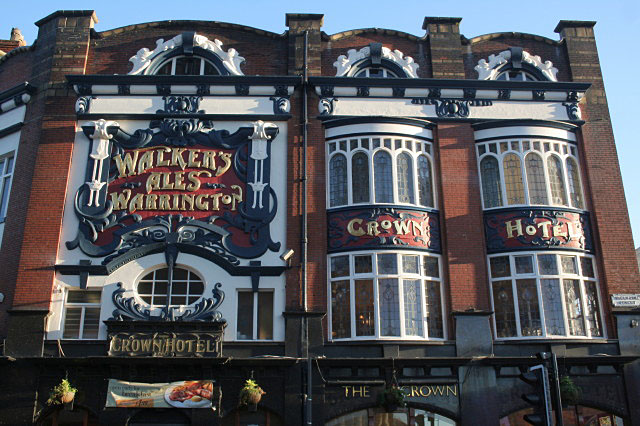
The Crown Hotel in Liverpool, an ornate Victorian pub.

Demand for the export style of pale ale, which had become known as "India pale ale" (IPA), developed in England around 1840. IPA became a popular product in England. Some brewers dropped the term "India" in the late 19th century, but records indicated that these "pale ales" retained the features of earlier IPA.

A pale and well-hopped style of beer was developed in Burton-on-Trent in parallel with the development of India pale ale elsewhere. Previously, Englishmen had drunk mainly stout and porter, but bitter (a development of pale ale) came to predominate. Beers from Burton were considered of a particularly high quality due to synergy between the malt and hops in use and local water chemistry, especially the presence of gypsum. This extensively hopped, lighter beer was easier to store and transport, and so favoured the growth of larger breweries. The switch from pewter tankards to glassware also led drinkers to prefer lighter beers. The development of rail links to Liverpool enabled brewers to export their beer throughout the British Empire. Burton retained absolute dominance in pale ale brewing: at its height one quarter of all beer sold in Britain was produced there until a chemist, C. W. Vincent discovered the process of Burtonisation to reproduce the chemical composition of the water from Burton-upon-Trent, thus giving any brewery the capability to brew pale ale.

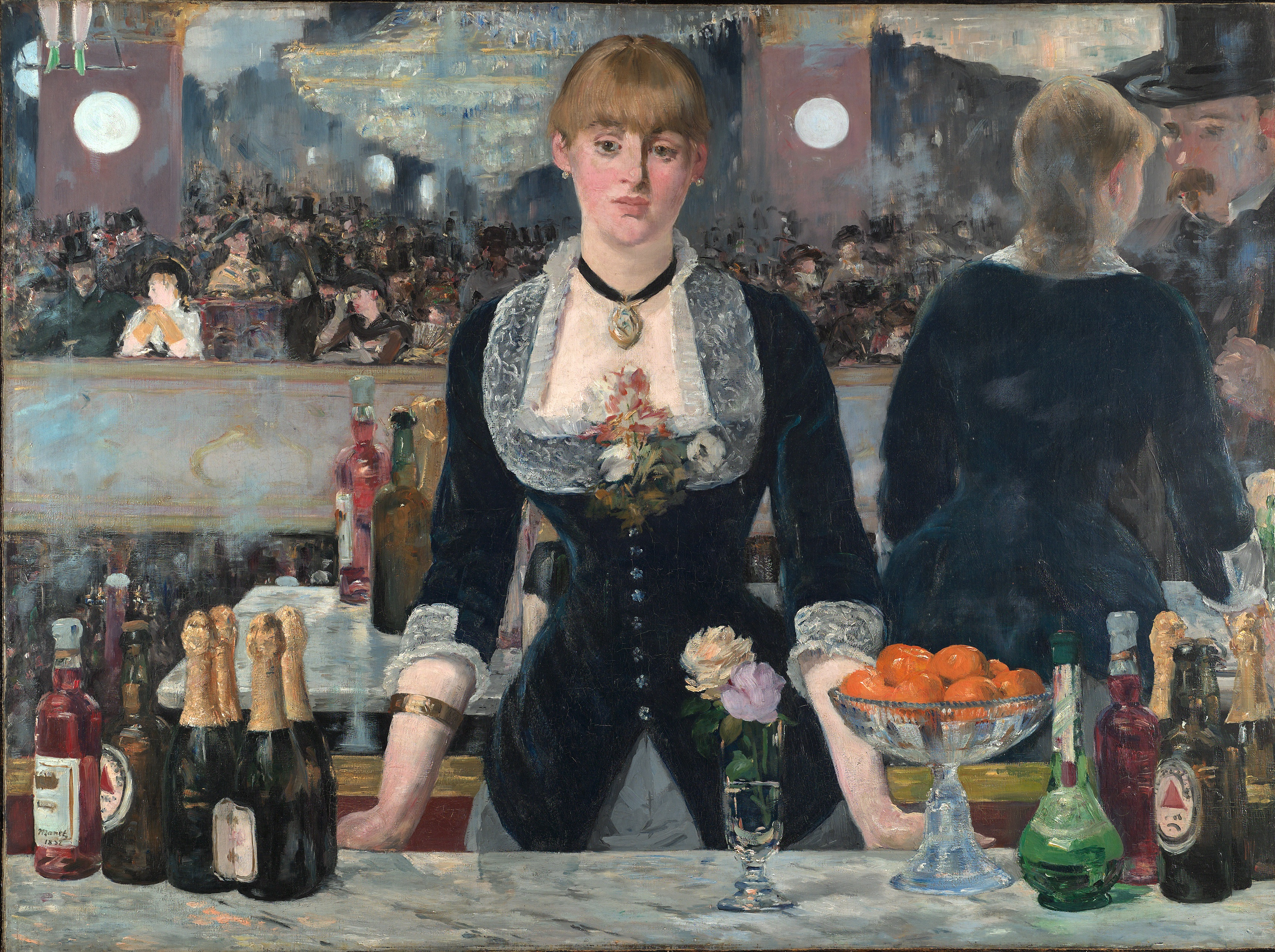
Bottles of Bass on the bar in Manet's 1882 A Bar at the Folies-Bergère.

In 1880, prime minister William Gladstone's government used the Inland Revenue Act 1880 to replace the long-standing malt tax with a duty on the finished product – beer. As a side effect, homebrewers that produced their own beer for "domestic use" were subject to registration, regulation and inspection, and were required to pay a licence fee. Home brewing was greatly reduced.

In the 19th century, a typical brewery produced three or four mild ales, usually designated by a number of Xs, the weakest being X, the strongest XXXX. They were considerably stronger than the milds of today, with the gravity ranging from around 1.055 to 1.072 (about 5.5% to 7% ABV). Gravities dropped throughout the late 19th century and by 1914 the weakest milds were down to about 1.045, still considerably stronger than modern versions.

Continental lagers began to be offered in pubs in the late 19th century, but remained a small part of the market for many decades.

=== 1900 to 1949: Temperance and war ===
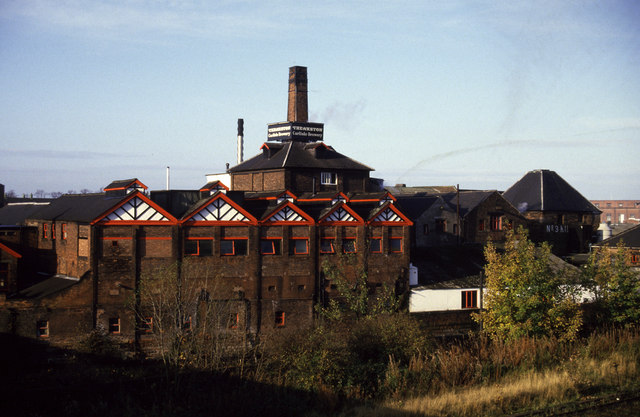
The State Management Scheme brewery, 1916–1971

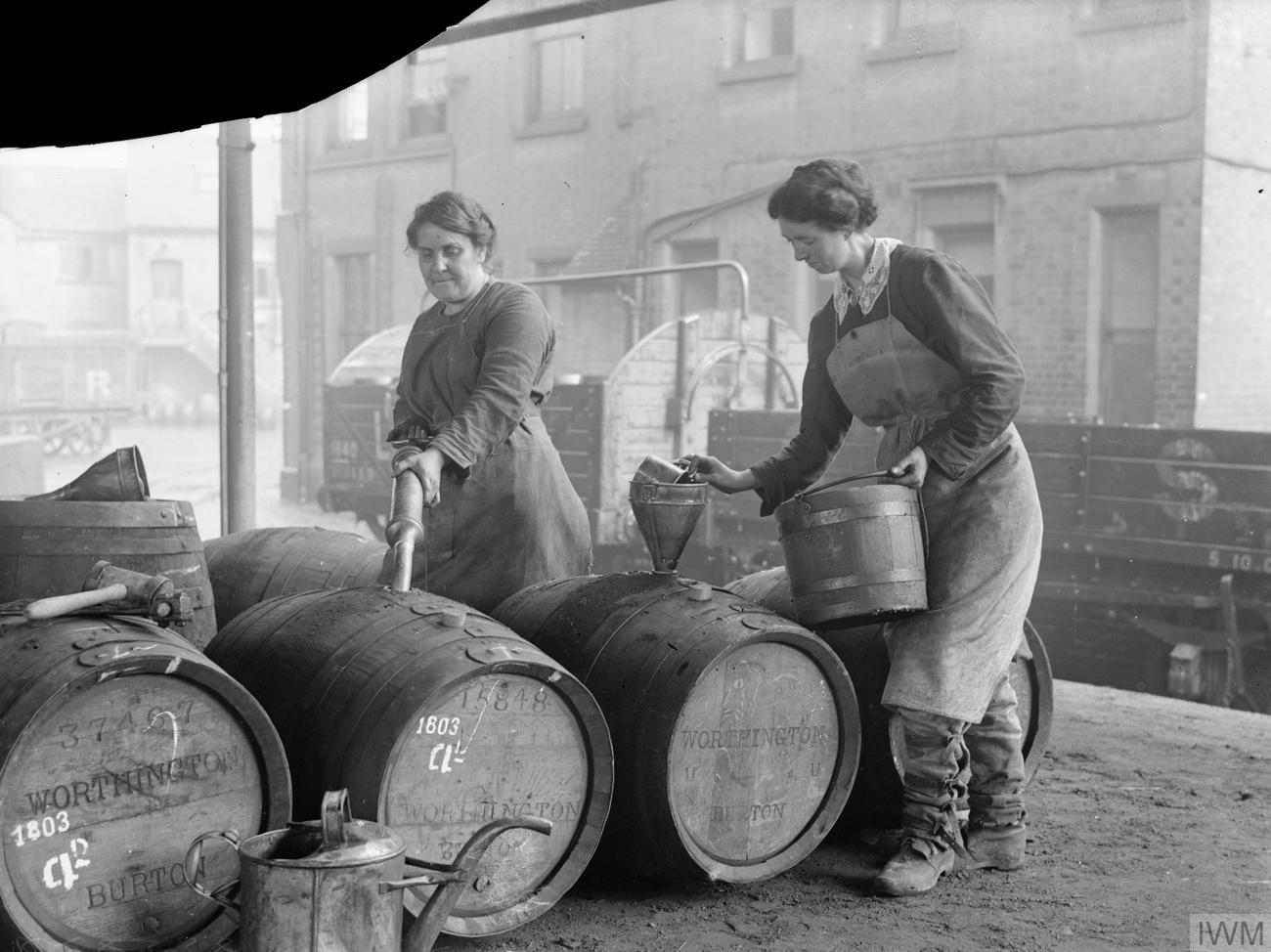
Brewers filling a keg with beer and hops, September 1918

The temperance movement of the late 19th and early 20th centuries, in combination with First World War emergency measures, introduced a number of changes, such as higher taxation on beer, lower strengths, a ban on "buying a round" and restricted opening hours. Most were gradually repealed over subsequent decades.

The First World War measures had a particularly dramatic effect upon mild ale. As the biggest-selling beer, it suffered the largest cut in gravity when breweries had to limit the average original gravity of their beer to 1.030. In order to be able to produce some stronger beer – which was exempt from price controls and thus more profitable – mild was reduced to 1.025 or lower.

English breweries continued to brew a range of bottled, and sometimes draught, stouts until the Second World War and beyond. They were considerably weaker than the pre-war versions (down from 1.055–1.060 to 1.040–1.042) and around the strength that porter had been in 1914. The drinking of porter, with its strength slot now occupied by single stout, steadily declined, and production ceased in the early 1950s. However, Irish-brewed stouts, particularly Guinness, remained firmly popular.

In the early 20th century, serving draught beer from pressurised containers began. Artificial carbonation was introduced in the United Kingdom in 1936, with Watney's experimental pasteurised beer Red Barrel, although this method of serving beer did not take hold in the UK until the late 1960s.

=== 1950 to 1999: Megabreweries and microbreweries ===
In 1960 almost 40 percent of beer drunk nationally was sold in bottled form, although the figure was 60 percent in the south of England, falling to 20 percent in the North of England. Pale ale had replaced mild as the beer of choice for the majority of drinkers.

Home brewing without a licence was legalised in 1963, and was to become a fairly popular hobby, with homebrewing equipment shops on many high streets. Lager rapidly rose in popularity from the 1970s, increasing from only 2 percent of the market in 1965 to 20 percent in 1975, with English brewers producing their own brands or brewing under licence. Canned beer was also introduced about this time.

A consumer organisation, the Campaign for Real Ale (CAMRA), was founded in 1971 to protect unpressurised beer. The group devised the term real ale to differentiate between beer served from the cask and beer served under pressure and to differentiate both from lager. "Ale" now meant a top-fermented beer, not an unhopped beer. CAMRA was to become an influential force, with a membership of over 170,000.

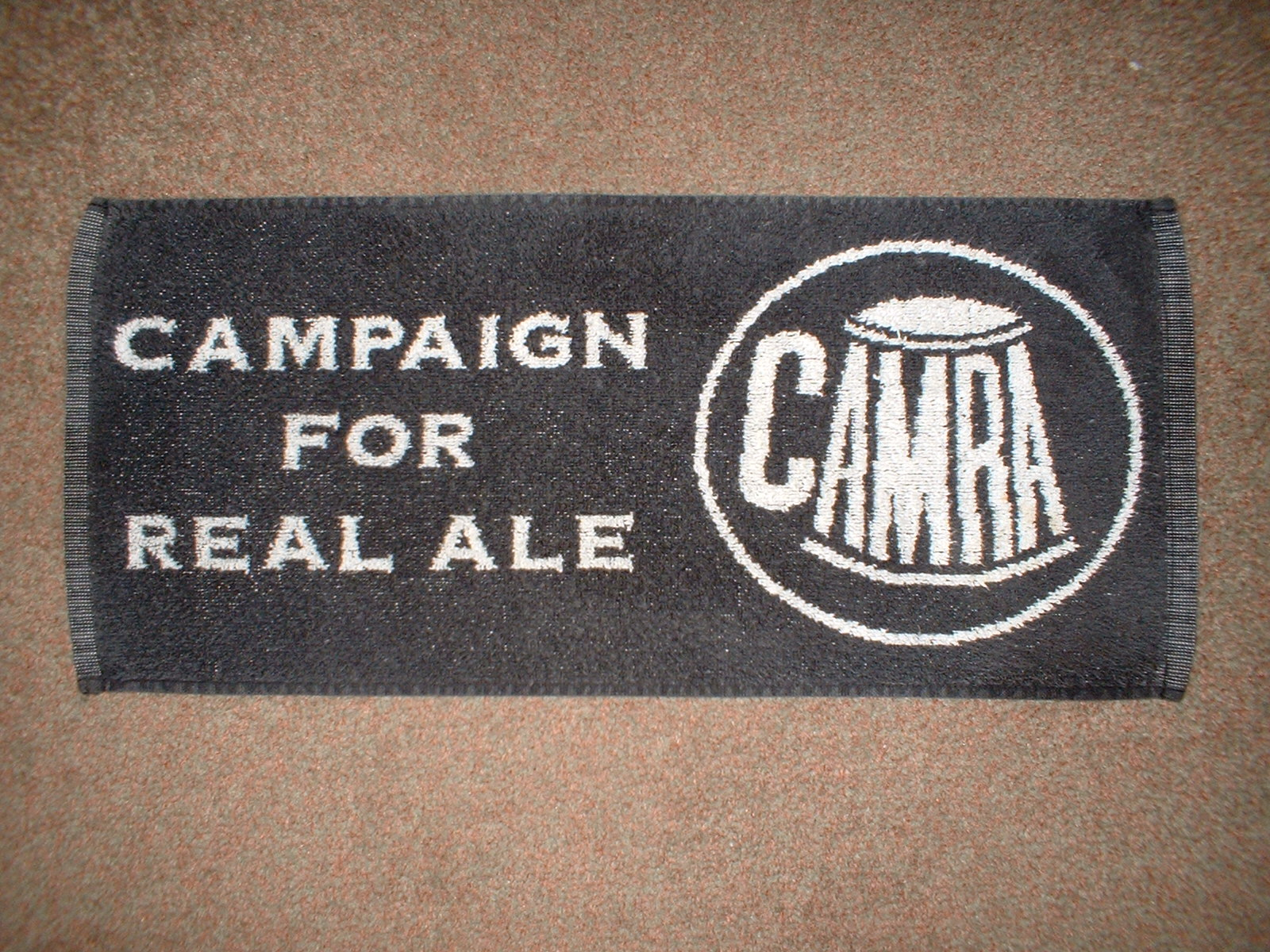
Camra bar towel

At the time, brewing was dominated by the "big six" breweries: Whitbread, Scottish and Newcastle, Bass Charrington, Allied Breweries, Courage Imperial and Watneys.

There were also dozens of regional breweries, although the number was dwindling as a result of takeovers, and the microbrewery sector consisted of just four long-standing brewpubs. Most pubs were owned by breweries and only allowed to offer the owning brewery's beers ("the tie"). CAMRA also campaigned against the tendency of smaller brewers to be bought up by larger ones, against short measures, for the preservation of historically significant pubs, and for increased choice and longer opening hours for pubs. CAMRA also produced a Good Beer Guide and campaigned for the preservation of mild ale, which was now seen as an endangered style.

English drinkers became more interested in imported beers during the 1970s and 1980s, partly as a result of increased foreign travel and partly because of promotion of the subject by beer writers such as Michael Jackson, with his 1977 The World Guide to Beer. Newly popular foreign brands included Beck's from Germany, Heineken and Grolsch from the Netherlands, Leffe and Hoegaarden from Belgium, Peroni from Italy, San Miguel from the Philippines, Budweiser and Sierra Nevada from the US and Corona Extra from Mexico. A number of bars specialise in imported beer, with food and decor to match, Belgian and Bavarian themes being the most common.

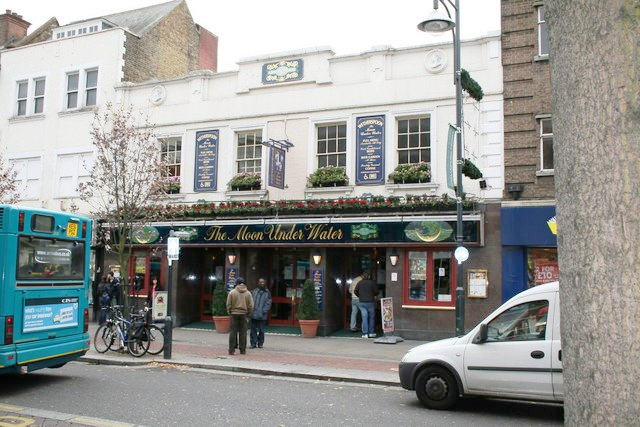
The Moon Under Water, 44 High Street, Watford. A J. D. Wetherspoon's pub named for Orwell's description.

In 1972, Martin Sykes established Selby Brewery as the first new independent brewing company in England for 50 years. "I foresaw the revival in real ale, and got in early", he said. By the end of the decade he was joined by over 25 new microbreweries, a trend which would only increase in the 1980s. In 1979, Tim Martin opened the first Wetherspoons pub, in Muswell Hill, north London. This was the basis of a national chain of pubs, (over 900 as of 2016) which were to prove influential on the British beer scene, because of their low prices, large premises, and championing of cask ale. Also in 1979 David Bruce established the first "Firkin" brewpub. The Firkin chain consisted of pubs offering cask ale brewed on the premises, or at another brewpub in the chain. The chain expanded to more than 100 pubs over its twenty-year history, considerably adding to the number of brewpubs in England. After a number of changes of ownership, brewing operations were wound up in 2001.

Two pieces of legislation, known as the Beer Orders, were introduced in December 1989, partly in response to CAMRA campaigning. The Orders restricted the number of tied pubs that could be owned by large brewery groups in the United Kingdom to 2,000, and required large brewer landlords to allow a guest ale to be sourced by tenants from someone other than their landlord. The industry responded by spinning off purely pub-owning companies ("pubcos"), such as Punch Taverns and Enterprise Inns, from the older brewing-and-owning companies, notably Allied Lyons, Bass, and Scottish & Newcastle. The Beer Orders were revoked in January 2003, by which time the industry had been transformed.

=== 2000 to present: hops and hipsters ===
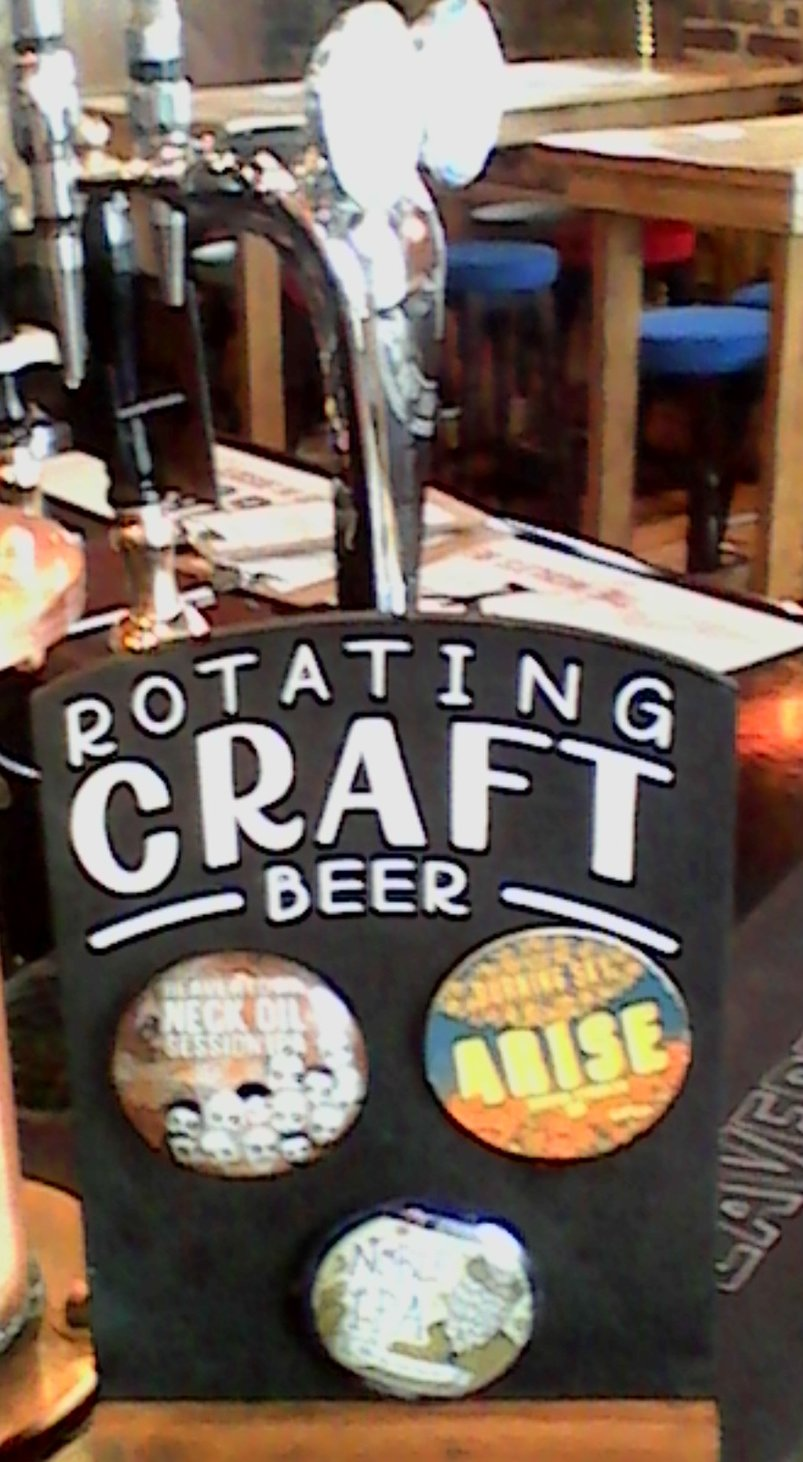
Sign advertising craft beer in an English pub.

A change to beer taxation, Progressive Beer Duty was introduced by Gordon Brown in 2002. It was a reduction in beer duty based on a brewery's total production and aimed at helping smaller breweries. The legislation had been campaigned for by the Society of Independent Brewers (Siba). In 2009, the combined sales of Siba's 420-plus members increased by 4% compared with 2008. By 2011, the breweries in the UK, were recording an average growth in beer sales of 3% to 7% per annum.

By 2004, the term real ale had been expanded to include bottle-conditioned beer, while the term cask ale had become the accepted global term to indicate a beer not served under pressure.

Interest in imported beer continued to rise, with an influx of Eastern European workers making Lech and Tyskie particularly popular, alongside Staropramen, Budvar and Kozel.

A piece of legislation popularly known as the "twenty four-hour drinking", officially the Licensing Act 2003 came into force in 2005. This removed the previous national restrictions on opening hours, allowing pubs and licensed premises to open for any or all of a twenty four-hour period, subject to agreement with the local licensing authorities. In practice, most pubs made only minor changes to their opening hours.

Although its founding father, Michael Jackson, died in 2007, modern beer writing was burgeoning, with beer columns appearing alongside wine columns in the quality press. Beer writing was to evolve into beer blogging, leaders in both fields including Martyn Cornell, Pete Brown, Roger Protz and Melissa Cole.

In July 2007, a law was introduced to ban smoking in all enclosed public places in England, including pubs. The ban had already been introduced in Scotland the previous year.

The popularity of lager fell from 74.5 per cent in 2008 to 74.3 per cent and the Observer publication suggested that British beer drinkers' "love affair with carbonated beers may finally have peaked". The 2010 edition of the Good Beer Guide showed that there were more than 700 real-ale brewers in the UK at the time of publication — the highest number since the Second World War and four times as many since the founding of Camra. Iain Loe, a spokesman for Camra, explained a preference for moderate alcohol levels and a perception that real ale was healthier as responsible for the shift.

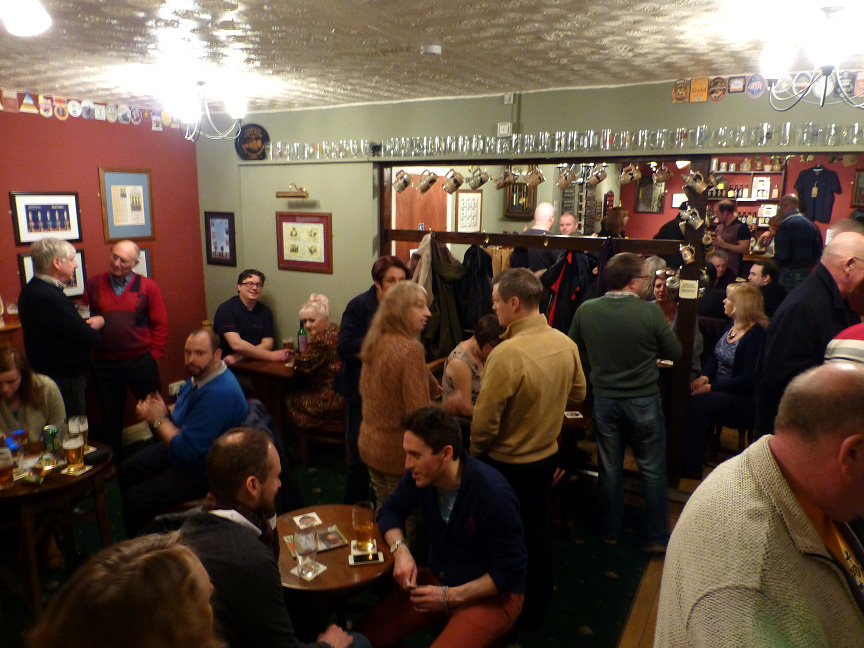
Hail to the Ale micropub, Claregate, Wolverhampton

Since the 2010s, there has been what some media outlets describe as an "explosion" of interest in craft beer. Although, the term "craft beer" does not have formal definition in the UK, it is generally taken to mean beer from small breweries which is highly flavourful and distinctive, particularly "hop forward" beers, delivered in bottles or the keykeg draught formats, ideas mainly deriving from the US microbrewery scene. Craft beer may stand alongside other beers in a mainstream pub, or be retailed in specialist outlets, such as the chain owned by Scottish brewers Brewdog. Craft beers are often stronger than standard ales and lagers, and may be sold in 1/3 pint and 2/3 pint measures in addition to the usual pints and halves. A number of commentators have noted that craft beer appeals to a younger clientele, particularly those characterised as hipsters. A number of breweries associated with the craft movement have been taken over by multinationals, prompting debate about whether they should still be considered "craft".

Although the choice available to English beer drinkers in the mid-2010s is perhaps unparalleled, there are concerns about the future of pubs, with about 30 closing per week. Bucking the trend somewhat are craft beer outlets, the Wetherspoons chain, and the micropub movement

The Wetherspoons chain has expanded to nearly 900 outlets over its 25-year history, most of them being former shops, banks and so on, rather than traditional pub premises. Describing themselves as freehouses, its branches offer a wider range of cask ales than other pubcos, and they have recently begun offering craft beer. Micropubs are small community pubs with limited opening hours, and focusing strongly on local cask ale.

With cask ale having a secure future, the Campaign for Real Ale has (as of March 2016) been reconsidering its aims, with the options including focusing on the preservation of pubs.

Levels of alcohol consumption amongst young people in England is significantly lower than previous generations, leading to the rise in popularity of lower-alcohol and alcohol-free beers. Major brewers have introduced alcohol-free varieties of established brands including Guinness and Heineken, and new brands have emerged to cater to the low-alcohol market including Lucky Saint.

== English beer styles ==
=== Bitter ===
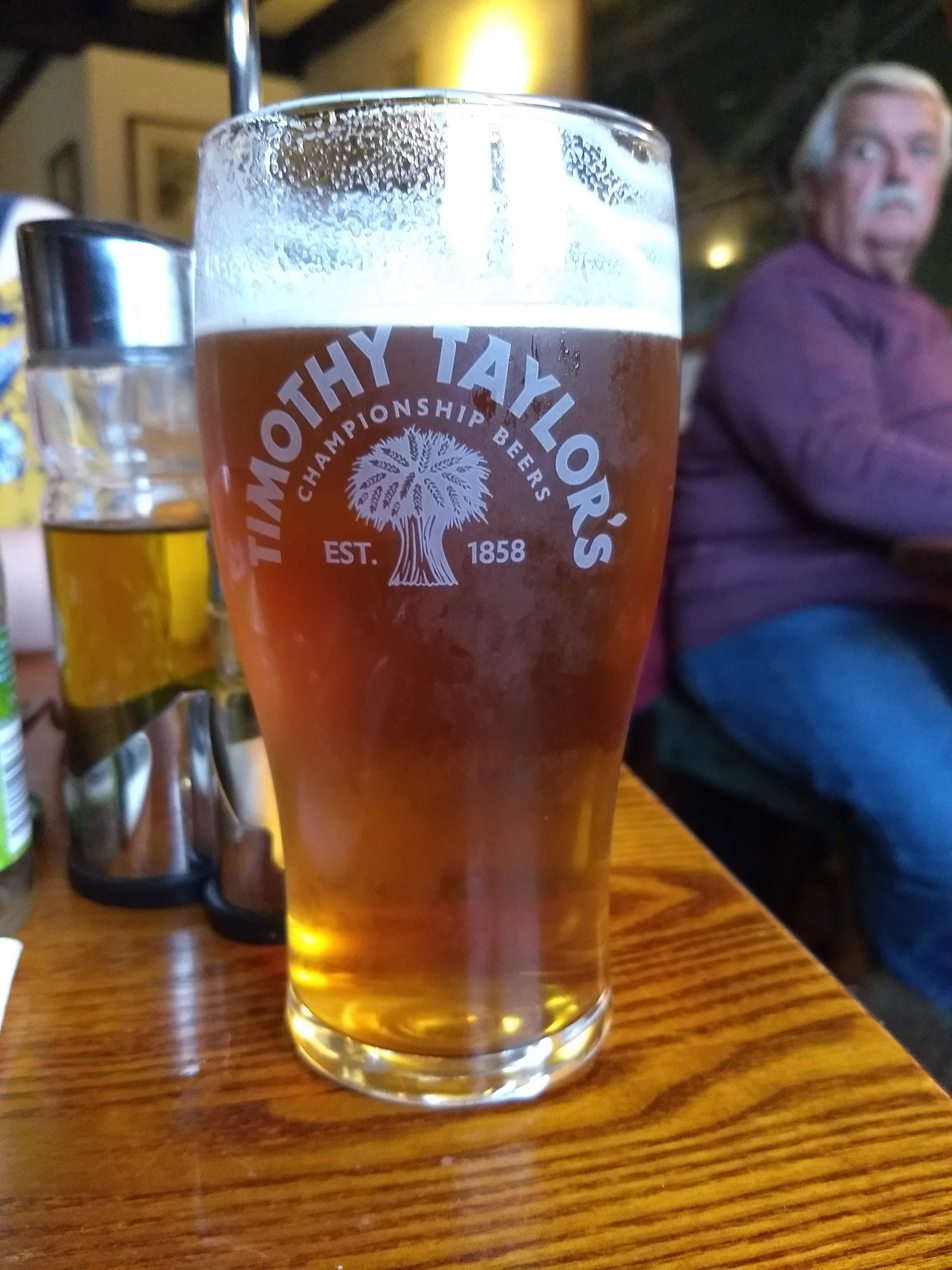
A pint of bitter

Bitter is the broad term applied to a well-hopped pale ale, from about 3.5% to 7% in strength and pale gold to dark mahogany in colour. English brewers have several loose names for variations in beer strength, such as best bitter, special bitter, extra special bitter, and premium bitter. There is no agreed and defined difference between an ordinary and a best bitter other than one particular brewery's best bitter will usually be stronger than its ordinary. Two groups of drinkers may mark differently the point at which a best bitter then becomes a premium bitter. Hop levels will vary within each sub group, though there is a tendency for the hops in the session bitter group to be more noticeable. Bitter is dispensed in most formats — hand-pulled from the cask, on draught from the keg, smoothflow or bottled. Drinkers tend to loosely group the beers into:

- Session or ordinary bitter have strength up to 4.1 per cent ABV. The majority of English beers with the name IPA will be found in this group, such as Greene King IPA, Flowers IPA, Wadworth Henrys Original IPA, etc. These session bitters are not as strong and hoppy as the 18th and 19th century IPAs (or as an India Pale Ale would be in the USA) although IPAs with modest gravities (below 1.040) have been brewed in England since at least the 1920s. This is the most common strength of bitter sold in English pubs, accounting for 16.9 per cent of pub sales.
- Best bitter have strength between 3.8 per cent and 4.7 per cent ABV. In the United Kingdom, Bitter above 4.2 per cent ABV accounts for just 2.9 per cent of pub sales. The disappearance of weaker bitters from some brewer's rosters means "best" bitter is actually the weakest in the range.
- Premium bitter have strength of 4.8 per cent ABV and over. Also known as extra special bitter, for instance Fuller's ESB.
- Golden ale or summer ales were developed in the late 20th century by breweries to compete with the pale lager market. A typical golden ale has an appearance and profile similar to that of a pale lager. Malt character is subdued and the hop profile ranges from spicy to citrus; common hop additions include Styrian Golding and Cascade. Alcohol is in the 4% to 5% range ABV. The style was marketed in 1989 by John Gilbert, a former brewer at Watney in Mortlake, London, who had opened his own operation, the Hop Back Brewery, in Salisbury, England. His aim was to develop a pale ale that could be as refreshing as lager. The result was a drier and hoppier pale ale he called "Summer Lightning", after a novel by PG Wodehouse; it won several awards and inspired numerous imitators.
- India Pale Ale – although it is often said that India Pale Ale, a strong and well-hopped beer, was designed to "survive the sea voyage to India", modern authorities consider this to be a myth. Twentieth century IPAs were equivalent to a typical bitter, although there has been a tendency to return to 18th century strengths (5.5 per cent upwards), hop rates, e.g. Thornbridge Brewery's Jaipur IPA and Fuller, Smith and Turner's Bengal Lancer, and to emphasise the Indian connection in their branding.

=== Brown ale ===
English brown ales range from beers such as Manns Original Brown Ale, which is quite sweet and low in alcohol, to North Eastern brown ale such as Newcastle Brown Ale, Double Maxim and Samuel Smith's Nut Brown Ale.

=== Mild ===
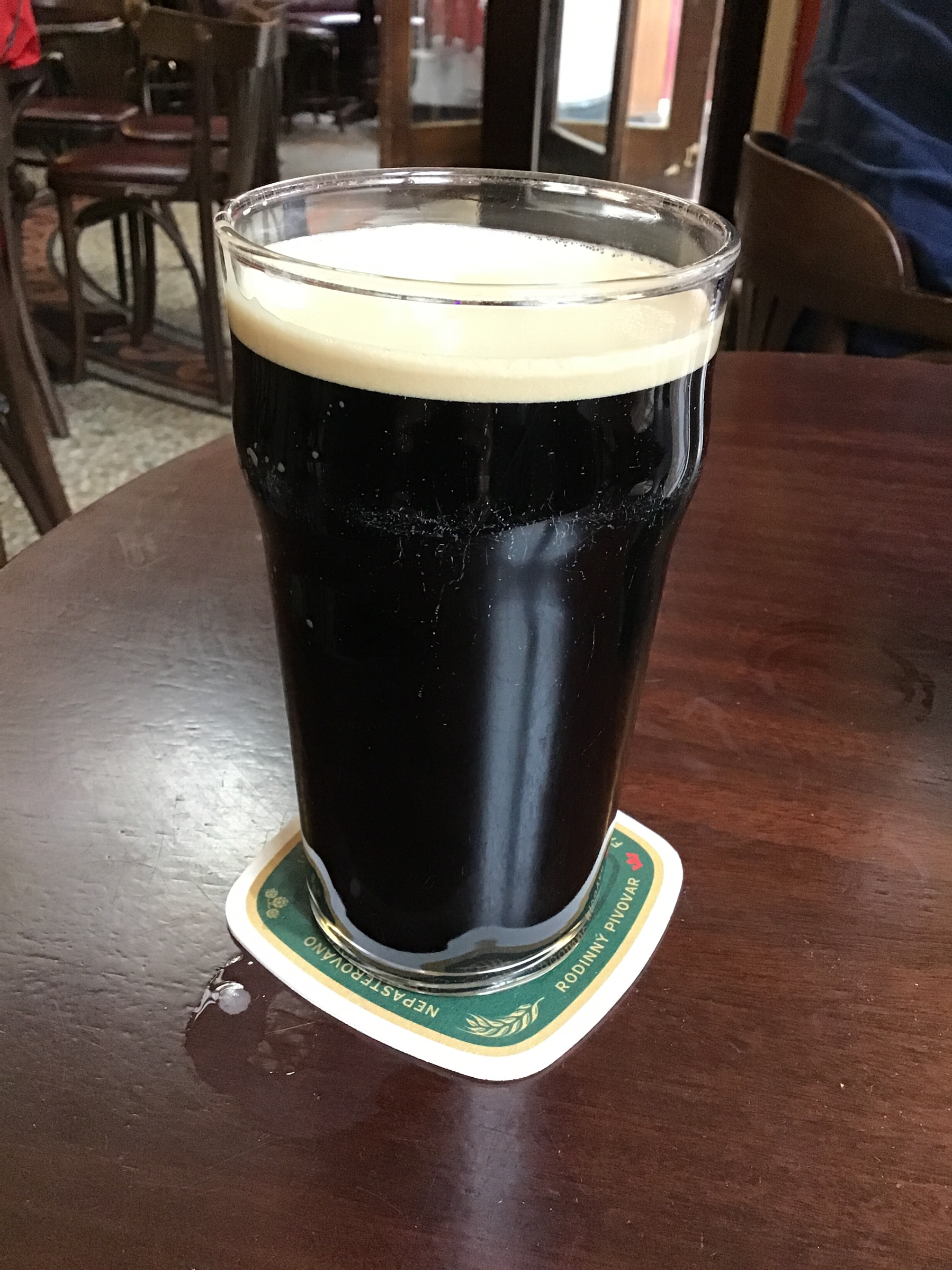
A pint of mild

Mild in modern times is generally considered to be a low-gravity beer with a low hop rate and predominantly malty palate. Historically, mild ales were of standard strength for the time (and rather strong by modern standards). Modern mild ales are mainly dark coloured with an abv of 3 per cent to 3.6 per cent, though there are lighter hued examples, as well as stronger more traditional examples reaching 6 per cent abv and higher. The term "mild" originally had nothing to do with strength or level of hop bitterness, but rather as a label for beers that were not "vatted" (aged) and hence did not have some of the tart and even slightly sour flavour of ales that were subject to long aging, which was considered a desirable attribute of premium ales. The dark colour characteristic of modern-day milds can come from either the use of roast malt or caramelised sugars, usually both. These ingredients lead to differences in flavour characteristics.

Mild is often thought to be partly a survival of the older style of hop-less brewing (hops were introduced in the 16th century), partly as a cheaper alternative to bitter (for a long time mild was a penny a pot, and bitter beer tuppence), and partly a sustaining but relatively unintoxicating beverage suitable for lunchtime drinking by manual workers. But in reality, mild was probably not hopped differently from other beers of the day, since the term "mild" referred primarily to a lack of the sour tang contributed by age, and not a lack of hop character or alcoholic strength,

Once sold in every pub, mild experienced a catastrophic fall in popularity after the 1960s and was in danger of disappearing from many parts of the United Kingdom. In recent years the explosion of microbreweries has led to a partial recovery, and an increasing number of mild (sometimes labelled 'Dark') brands are now being brewed. Most of these are in the more modern interpretation of "mild"...a sweeter brew with lower alcoholic strength.

Light mild is similar but pale in colour, for instance Harveys Brewery Knots of May. There is some overlap between the weakest styles of bitter and light mild, with the term AK being used to refer to both. The designation of such beers as "bitter" or "mild" has tended to change with fashion. A good example is McMullen's AK, which was re-badged as a bitter after decades as a light mild. AK (a very common beer name in the 19th century) was often referred to as a "mild bitter beer" interpreting "mild" as "unaged". Some breweries have revived the traditional high-gravity strong mild, with alcohol content of 6 per cent or so, the classic example being Sarah Hughes Ruby, brewed to a Victorian recipe.

=== Burton Ale ===
Burton Ale is a strong ale, produced in Burton on Trent since at least the 16th century, which is darker and sweeter than bitter. It has sometimes been used as a synonym for old ale.

=== Old ale ===
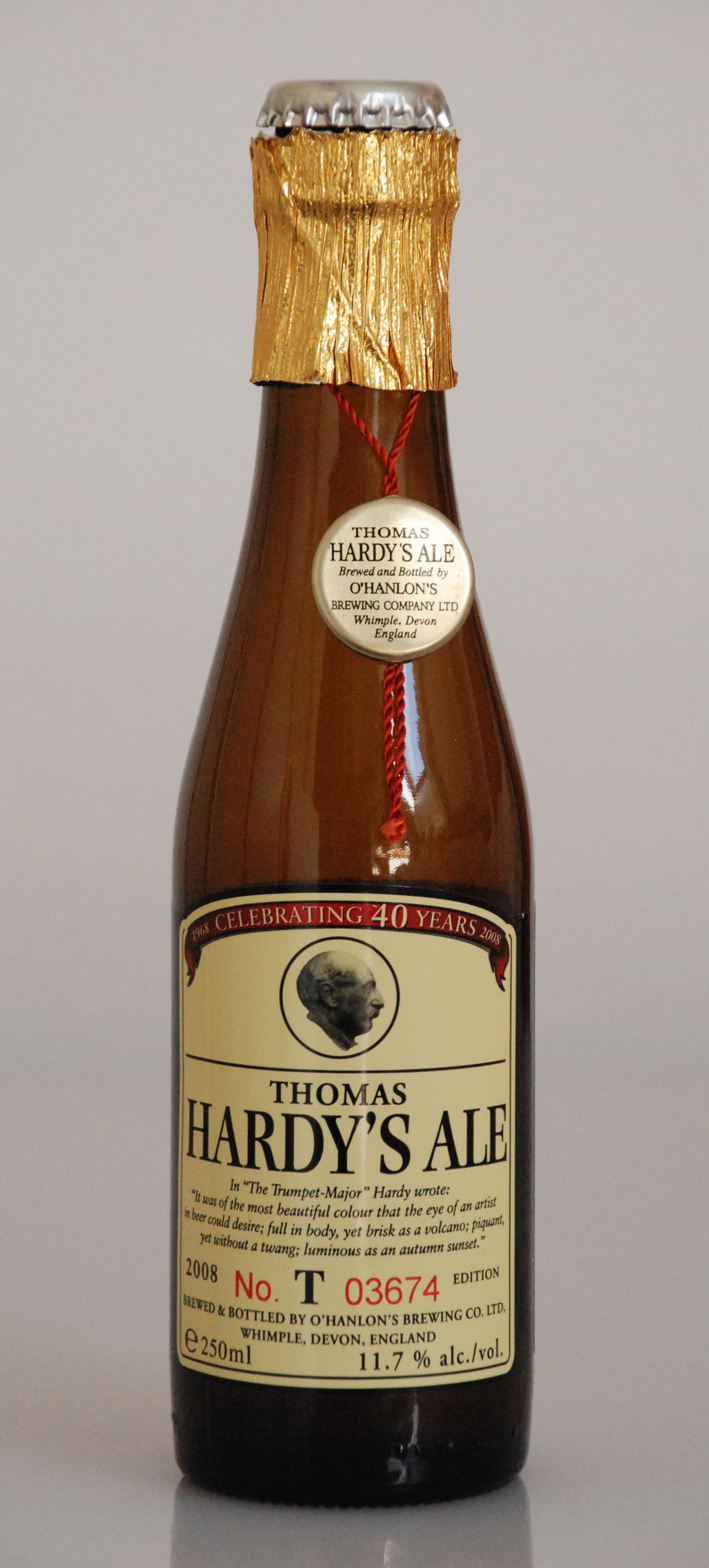
Bottle of Thomas Hardy's Ale (11.7% ABV)

Old ale is a term applied to dark, malty beers above 4.5% ABV, also sometimes called Winter Warmers. Many have "old" in the name, such as Theakston's Old Peculier, Marston's Owd Roger, Robinson's Old Tom. Many brewers make high ABV old ales for bottling, some of which are bottle-conditioned and can mature for several years. Some of these stronger versions are known as barley wine. Stock ale is a strong beer which is used for blending with weaker beers at the brewery and not sold directly. The upper limit on strength for this style is about 11%–12% ABV.

=== Porter and Stout ===
Porter is a historically significant style developed in 18th century London, which is the ancestor of stout. English Porters and stouts are generally as dark or darker than old ales, and significantly more bitter. They differ from dark milds and old ales in the use of roast grains, which adds to the bitterness, and lends flavours of toast, biscuit or coffee.

Variations on the style include oatmeal stout, oyster stout, the sweet milk stout, and the very strong imperial stout, all of which are generally available in bottles only. These speciality beers have a tiny proportion of the market, but are of interest to connoisseurs worldwide.

London porter differs from stout in having generally lower gravity and lighter body, closer to bitter. Porter as distinct from stout virtually disappeared during the mid-20th century, but has had a modest revival since the 1980s (e.g. Dark Star Original, Fuller's London Porter).

=== Archaic styles ===
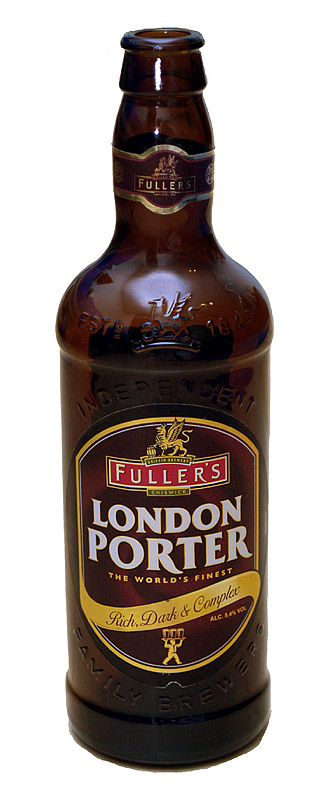
Fullers London Porter

Mum, a strong wheat beer with herbal flavouring.

Small beer was a low-strength beer that was consumed throughout the day by all ages. A later survival of small beer were the low-gravity light ale and boys bitter.

Stingo or spingo was strong or old ale. The name may come from the sharp, or "stinging" flavour of a well-matured beer. The Blue Anchor Inn, Helston calls its beers "spingo". The term "stingo" has associations with Yorkshire.

Three threads and Entire. A much repeated story has it that 18th century London drinkers liked to blend aged (up to 18 months) and fresh beers into a mixture known as three threads, and that a certain Ralph Harwood came up with an "entire" beer that reproduced the taste of the mixture in a single brew, and that this "Entire" was the ancestor of porter and stout. However, modern beer scholars tend to doubt the veracity of the story. Nevertheless, a few latter-day Entires are produced (e.g. Old Swan Brewery and Hop Back Brewery).

West Country White Beer was a spontaneously fermented wheat beer.

Wobble was historically a low-strength ale that was provided on site to workers in particularly heavy and thirst-inducing occupations, such as foundries. However, modern-day beers called Wobble tend to be strong.

=== Lager ===
Lager is the term generally used in the UK for bottom-fermented beer.

Despite the traditional English beer being ale, more than half of the current English market is now lager in the Pilsener and Export styles. These lighter coloured, bottom fermented beers first started gaining real popularity in England in the later part of the 20th century.

Carling, from both British and Canadian origin owned by the American/Canadian brewing giant Molson Coors Brewing Company, is the best-selling beer in Britain and is mainly brewed in Burton upon Trent. Meanwhile, the largest brewery in the UK today, Heineken which has three main breweries at (Manchester, Reading and Tadcaster), brews the UK's second-highest selling beer, the lager Foster's.

Other lagers popular in England include Kronenbourg (which also belongs to Carlsberg) and Stella Artois (which belongs to the Belgian brewery InBev and is brewed at Samlesbury near Preston).

Indian cuisine is very popular in England and special lagers such as Cobra Beer have been developed to accompany it.

== Serving beer ==
=== Temperature ===
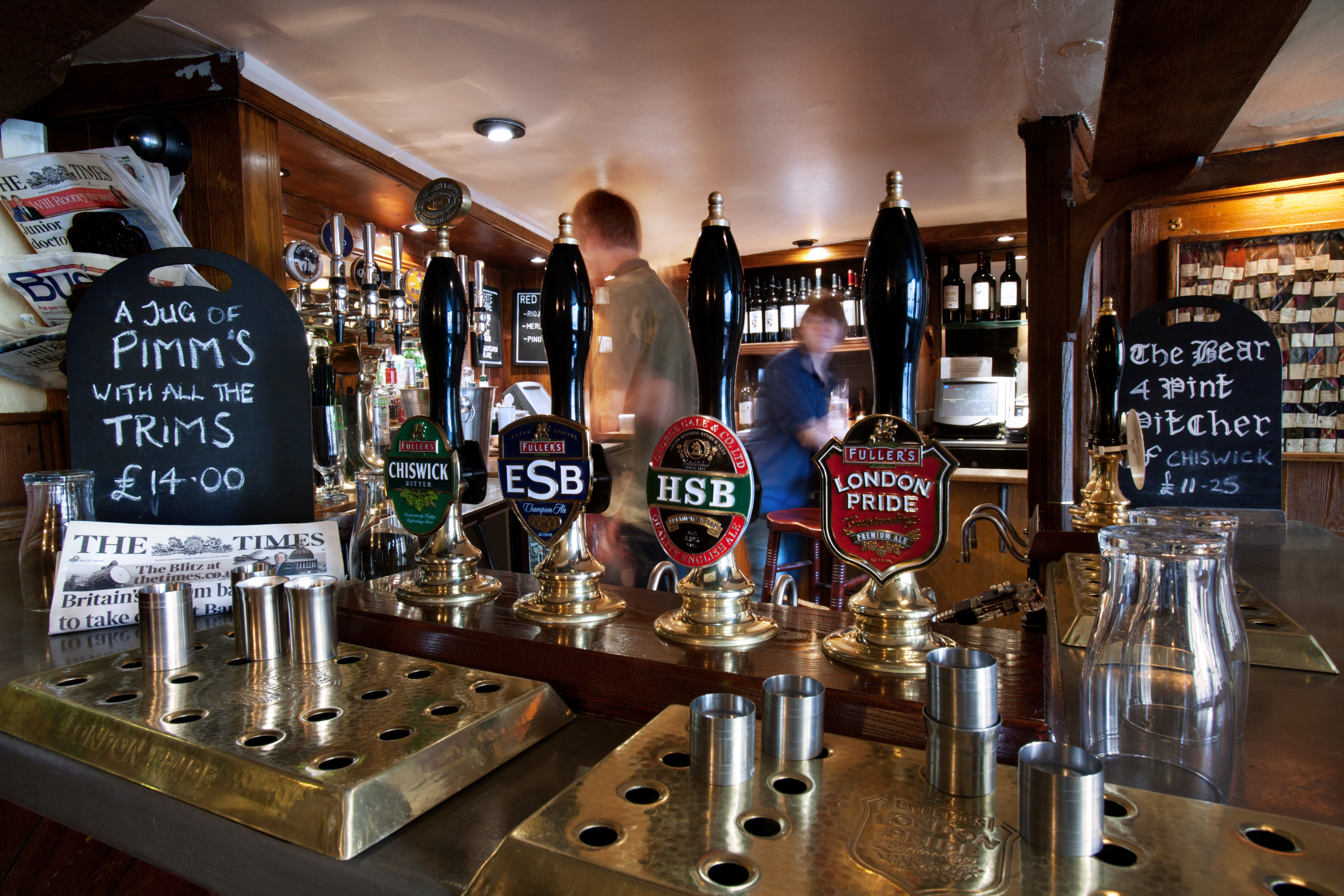
Manual beer pumps dispensing British beers from Fuller's Brewery

Beer in England is usually served at cellar temperature (between 10–14 °C (50–57 °F)), which is often controlled in a modern-day pub, although the temperature can naturally fluctuate with the seasons. Proponents of English beer say that it relies on subtler flavours than that of other nations, and these are brought out by serving it at a temperature that would make other beers seem harsh. Where harsher flavours do exist in beer (most notably in those brewed in Yorkshire), these are traditionally mitigated by serving the beer through a hand pump fitted with a sparkler, a device that mixes air with the beer, therefore aerating and slightly oxidising the beer and softening the flavour while giving the beer an attractive head of foam.

=== Cask ale and beer ===
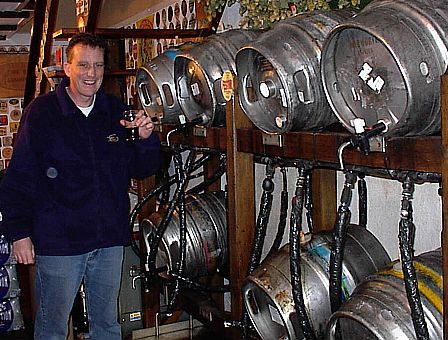
A "stillage" of cask ales on racks

A cask is the traditional method of bulk supply to a pub. The brew is then served from the cask in a cellar via a hand pump, electric pump or by gravity straight from the cask on stillage wherever the cask is kept. Cask conditioned beer is unfiltered and unpasteurized, giving it a limited shelf-life. It lacks artificial carbonation. Instead, dissolved gas is produced by ongoing secondary fermentation, the gas coming out of solution forming bubbles in the glass. These dispense methods are associated with ale, although there is no technical barrier to serving lager or stout the same way. (In Scotland, Harviestoun Brewery’s Schiehallion lager is available in cask in some pubs.) Most pubs use hand pumps ("beer engines") to draw the beer, whereas stillages are commonly employed at beer festivals. Cask ale and bottle conditioned beer are championed by the Campaign for Real Ale under the name real ale. Prior to stainless steel casks, beer was delivered in wooden barrels, which were lowered to the cellar via a trap-door on the footpath using two ropes wound about the barrels midriff (a parbuckle) to lower the barrel gently down the cellar's ramp. They then had to stand on their sides for a few days so the sediment would settle to the bottom of the belly of the barrel, after which they would be "tapped" by punching the pre-cut centre of the (traditionally cork) bung (at the lower edge of the barrel end) into the barrel by hitting the tapered brass "tap" with a mallet. One could then attach the pipe connector onto the tap, so that the cellarman could turn the tap on when ready. In a similar manner, one would punch through the centre of a bung on the upper side of the barrel's belly with a hardwood spile (tapered peg). The hardwood spile prevents air access. Once the barrel is in use, the spile is replaced with a "soft" spile, traditionally made from softwood, but nowadays from bonded-together (woody) fibres. The soft spile prevents a vacuum forming at the upper surface of the beer: it allows sufficient air in for the beer engine to work, but keeps dust, flies and other mischief-makers out.

=== Keg ale ===
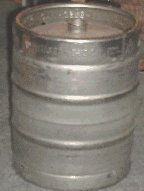
A typical 11 Gallon keg with single opening in the centre of the top end

Keg beer is a term for beer which is served from a keg, under external carbon dioxide pressure. Keg beer is often filtered, to remove the yeast, and/or pasteurized, to render the yeast inactive, increasing the shelf life of the product. However, some believe this is at the expense of flavour.

In the early 20th century, draught beer started to be served from pressurised containers. Artificial carbonation was introduced in the United Kingdom in 1936, with Watney's experimental pasteurised beer Red Barrel. By the early 1970s the term "draught beer" almost exclusively referred to beer served under pressure as opposed to the traditional cask or barrel beer.

The Campaign for Real Ale was founded in 1971 to protect traditional – unpressurised – beer and brewing methods. Keg beer was replacing traditional cask ale in all parts of the UK, primarily because it requires less care to handle. The campaign group devised the term real ale to differentiate between beer served from the cask and beer served under pressure.

=== Nitrokeg ===
Nitrokeg dispense is a variation on keg dispense, using a gas mixture emphasising nitrogen instead of carbon dioxide (CO_{2}). It is associated with stouts and Irish "red" ales.

Nitrogen is used under high pressure when dispensing dry stouts (such as Guinness) and other creamy beers because it displaces CO_{2} to (artificially) form a rich tight head and a less carbonated taste. This makes the beer feel smooth on the palate and gives a foamy appearance. Premixed bottled gas for creamy beers is usually 75 per cent nitrogen and 25 per cent CO_{2}. This premixed gas which only works well with creamy beers is often referred to as Guinness Gas, Beer Gas, or Aligal. Using "Beer Gas" with other beer styles can cause the last 5 per cent to 10 per cent of the beer in each keg to taste very flat and lifeless.

=== Keykeg ===
Since the 2000s, a number of brewers and outlets have been introducing a variation on keg dispense. Keykegs deliver the product under gas pressure, but it is internally held in plastic bag, rather like a wine box, so that the gas does not affect the beer. Keykeg beer can also be naturally carbonated, and lightly filtered, removing some of the objections to the older keg format. Nonetheless, it retains much of the advantage in terms of shelf life of the older keg format.

Almost any kind of beer can be delivered in this format, although it tends to be mainly associated with imported, stronger, and speciality beers. The keykeg format is suitable for transporting beer internationally, unlike traditional cask ales, allowing pubs and other outlets to offer a cosmopolitan range. On the other hand, this is a plastic single-use keg. What is, environmentally a major disadvantage.

=== Sparkler ===
A sparkler is a device that can be attached to the nozzle of a beer engine. Designed rather like a shower-head, beer dispensed through a sparkler becomes aerated and frothy which results in a noticeable head. Some CO_{2} is carried into the head, resulting in a softer, sweeter flavour due to the loss of normal CO_{2} acidity.

There is some dispute about the benefits of a sparkler. There is an argument that the sparkler can reduce the flavour and aroma, especially of the hops, in some beers. The counter argument is that the sparkler takes away harshness. A pub may favour sparklers because the larger head they produce means it does not need to supply as much beer.

Breweries may state whether or not a sparkler is preferred when serving their beers. Generally, breweries in northern England serve their beers with a sparkler attached and breweries in the south without.

=== Bottled beer ===
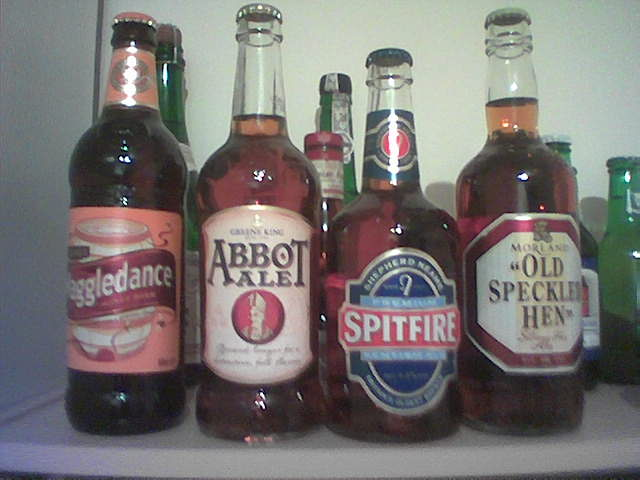
English bottled ales

Whilst draught beer takes up the majority of the market, bottled beer has a firm place and is a growing sector. Some brands are sold almost entirely in the bottled format, such as Newcastle Brown Ale and Worthington White Shield. CAMRA promotes bottle-conditioned beer as "real ale in a bottle".

=== Outlets ===
The English pub is a national institution. At one time certain pubs, known as alehouses, were allowed to sell only beer. Now most pubs are licensed to sell a range of drinks, with beer making up a significant proportion. The range of beer available in a given establishment can vary from a few mass-market products to a wide selection of cask ales and bottled beers, in a free house. The latter are sometimes called "chalkies" because the current selection of cask ales is often written on a blackboard.

Some on-licensed establishments are considered bars rather than pubs; they are less likely to be free standing, and more likely to be urban in setting and modern in style. "New wave" beer bars tend to specialise in bottled and pressure-dispensed craft beers from around the world, rather than the cask ales of traditional real ale pubs. Some establishments imitate Dutch or Belgian cafés, or German bierkellers as a novelty, with a range of draught and bottled beer to match.

Most off licences (i.e. liquor stores) sell at least a dozen bottled beers. Some specialists sell many more, and may include a few cask ales that can be dispensed to customers in containers to be taken home.

The English do not have a long-standing tradition of beer festivals like the Munich Oktoberfest, but the idea of a "beer exhibition" where a wide variety can be sampled has been enthusiastically taken up since the 1970s. The largest is CAMRA's Great British Beer Festival held every August. Local CAMRA branches organise smaller festivals in most vicinities. Beer festivals often include competitions to judge the best beer.

=== Glassware ===
==== Historical drinking vessels ====
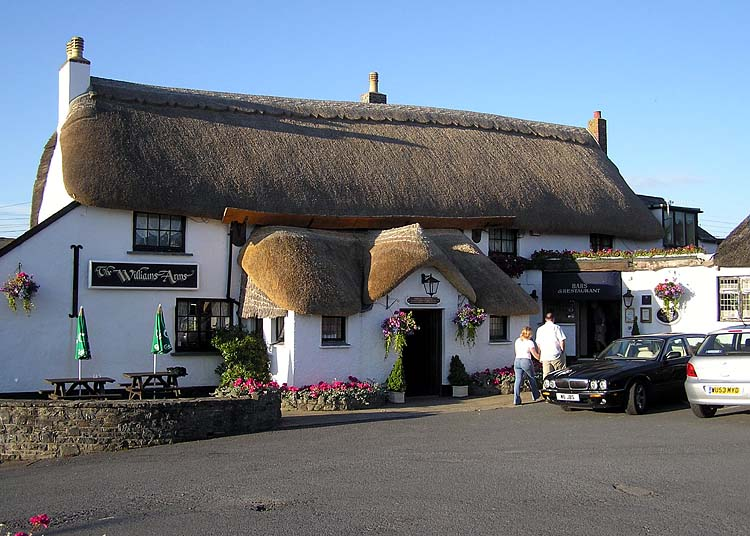
A thatched country pub, the Williams Arms, near Braunton, North Devon, England

A tankard is a form of drinkware consisting of a large, roughly cylindrical, drinking cup with a single handle. Tankards are usually made of silver, pewter, or glass, but can be made of other materials, for example wood, ceramic or leather. A tankard may have a hinged lid, and tankards featuring glass bottoms are also fairly common. Tankards are now rarely used, except those made from glass, but historic tankards are often used as decorative items.

A Toby Jug—also sometimes known as a Fillpot (or Philpot)—is a pottery jug in the form of a seated person, or the head of a recognizable person (often an English king). Typically the seated figure is a heavy-set, jovial man holding a mug of beer in one hand and a pipe of tobacco in the other and wearing 18th century attire: a long coat and a tricorn hat. Like metal tankards, they are now considered decorative items.

A yard of ale or yard glass is a very tall beer glass used for drinking around 2.5 imperial pints (1.4 L) of beer, depending upon the diameter. The glass is approximately 1 yard long, shaped with a bulb at the bottom, and a widening shaft which constitutes most of the height. The glass most likely originated in 17th-century England where the glass was known also as a "Long Glass", a "Cambridge Yard (Glass)" and an "Ell Glass". It is associated by legend with stagecoach drivers, though was mainly used for drinking feats and special toasts. Drinking a yard glass full of beer as quickly as possible is a traditional pub game; the bulb at the bottom of the glass makes it likely that the contestant will be splashed with a sudden rush of beer towards the end of the feat. The fastest drinking of a yard of ale (1.42 litres) in the Guinness Book of Records is five seconds. The former Australian Prime Minister Bob Hawke once held the world record for drinking a yard.

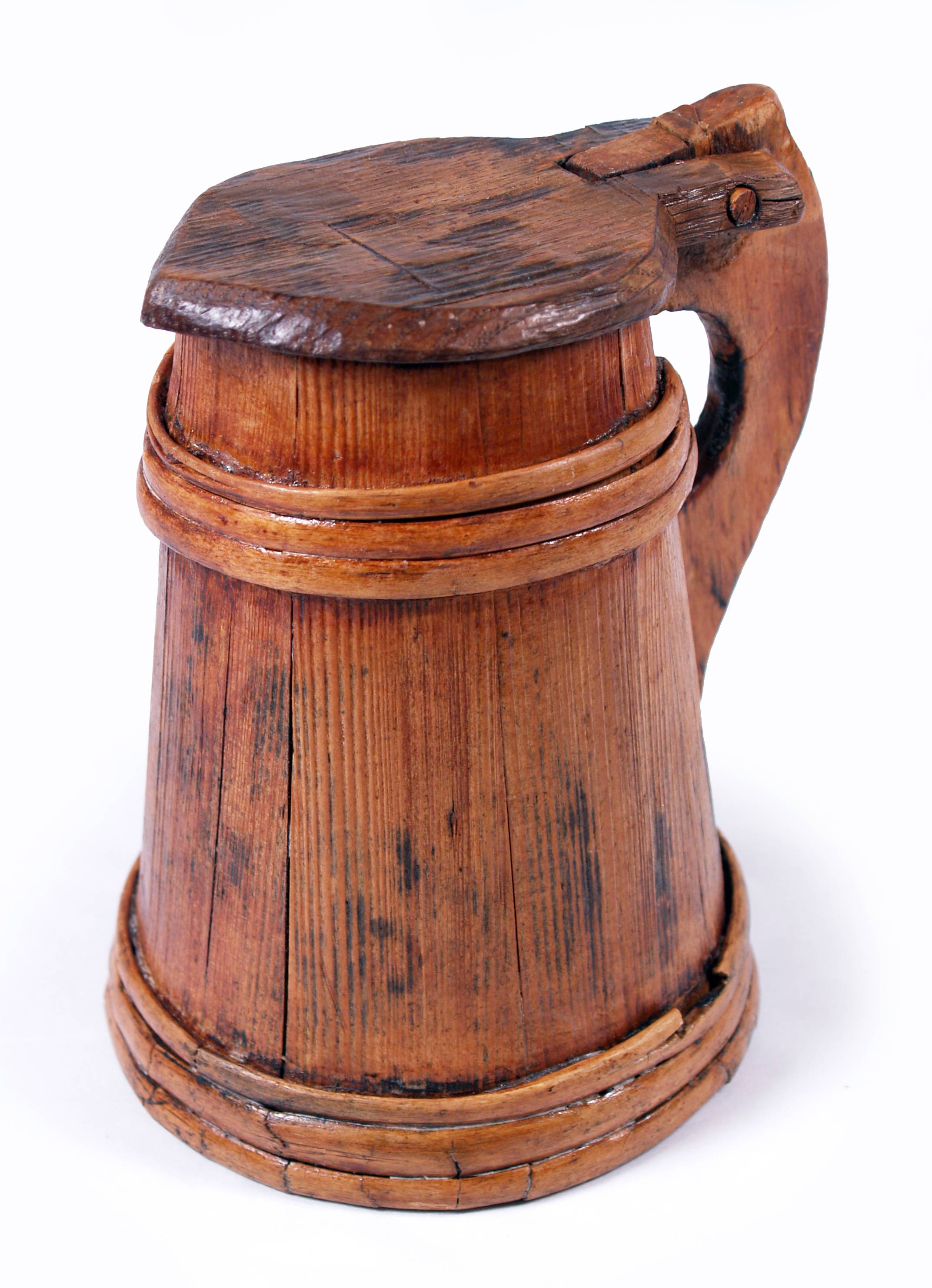
A wooden tankard found on board the 16th century carrack Mary Rose.

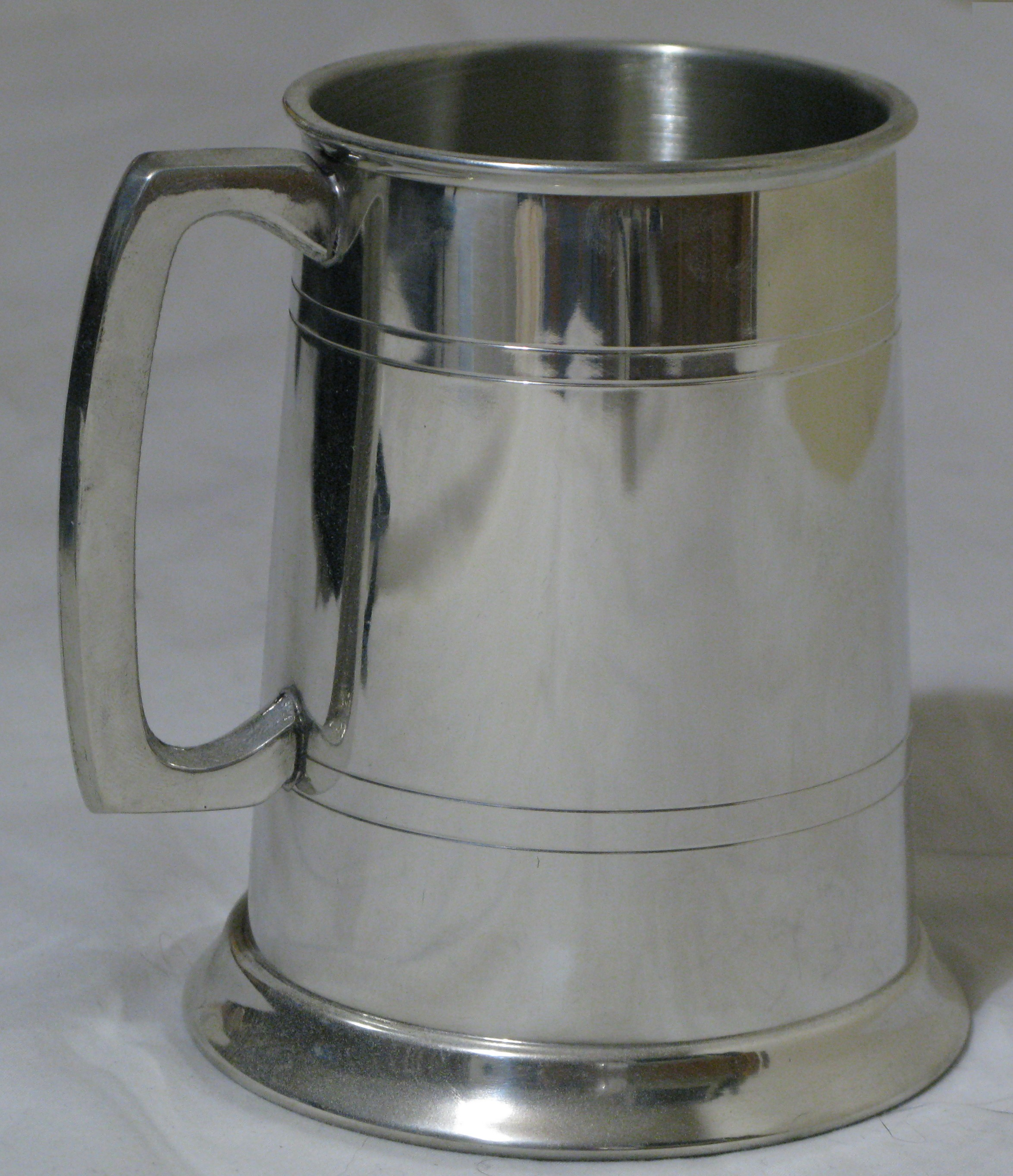
Pewter tankard

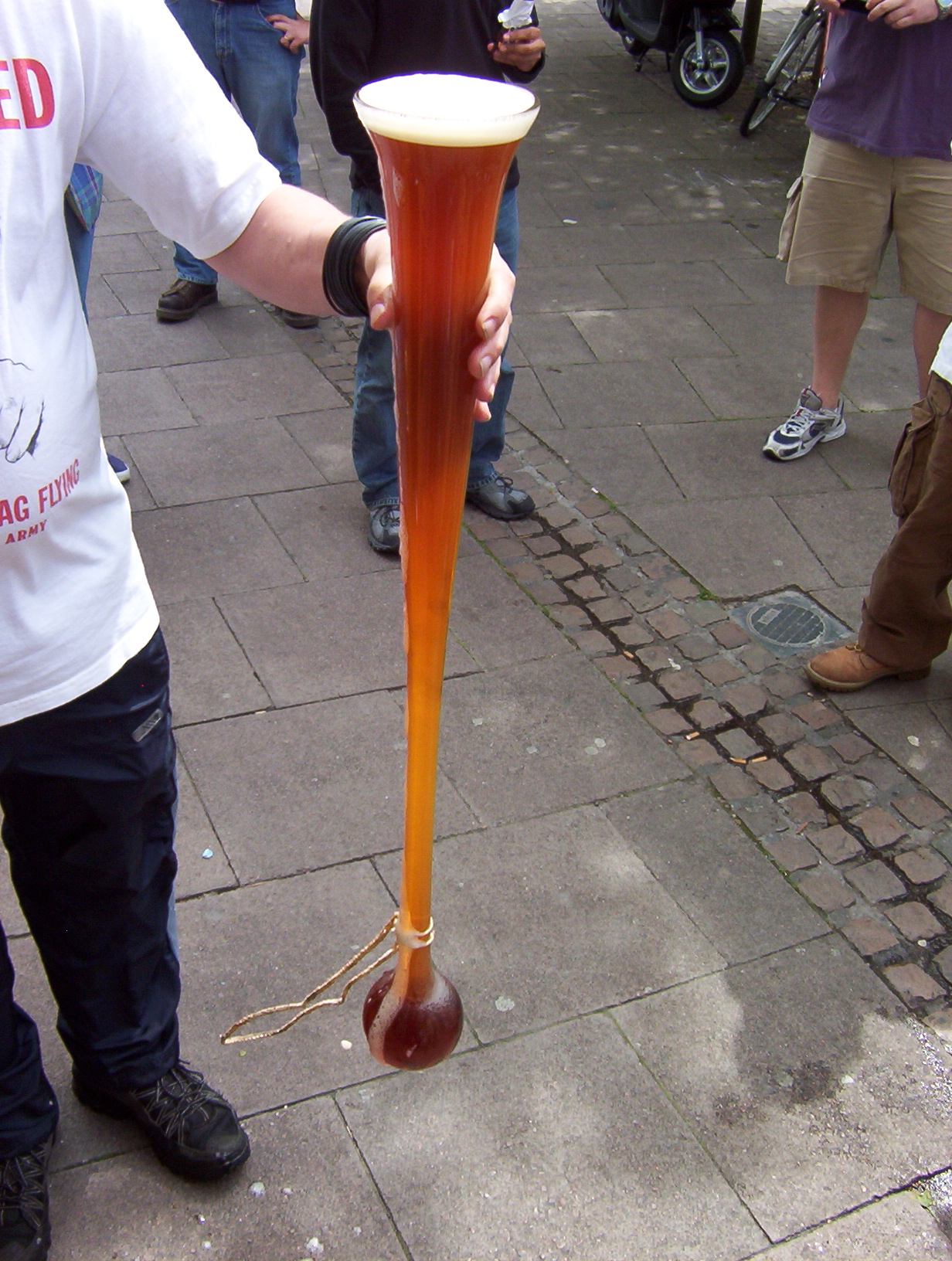
A yard of ale

==== Current beer glasses ====
Beer is now generally sold in pint and half-pint glasses (Half-pint glasses are generally smaller versions of pint glasses.). The common shapes of pint glass are:

- Conical glasses are shaped, as the name suggests, as an inverted truncated cone around 6 inches (15 cm) tall and tapering by about 1 inch (25 mm) in diameter over its height.
- The nonic, a variation on the conical design, where the glass bulges out a couple of inches from the top; this is partly for improved grip, partly to prevent the glasses from sticking together when stacked, and partly to give strength and stop the rim from becoming chipped or "nicked". The term "nonic" derives from "no nick".
- Jug glasses, Barrel glasses, or "dimple mugs", are shaped more like a large mug with a handle. They are moulded with a grid pattern of thickened glass on the outside, somewhat resembling the segmentation of a WWII-era hand grenade. The dimples prevent the glass slipping out of the fingers in a washing-up bowl, and the design of the glass emphasises strength, also to withstand frequent manual washing. These design features became less important when manual washing was superseded by machine washing. from the 1960s onwards. Dimpled glasses are now rarer than the other types and are regarded as more traditional. This sort of glass is also known as a "Handle" due to the handle on the glass. They are popular with the older generation and people with restricted movement in their hands which can make holding a usual pint glass difficult.
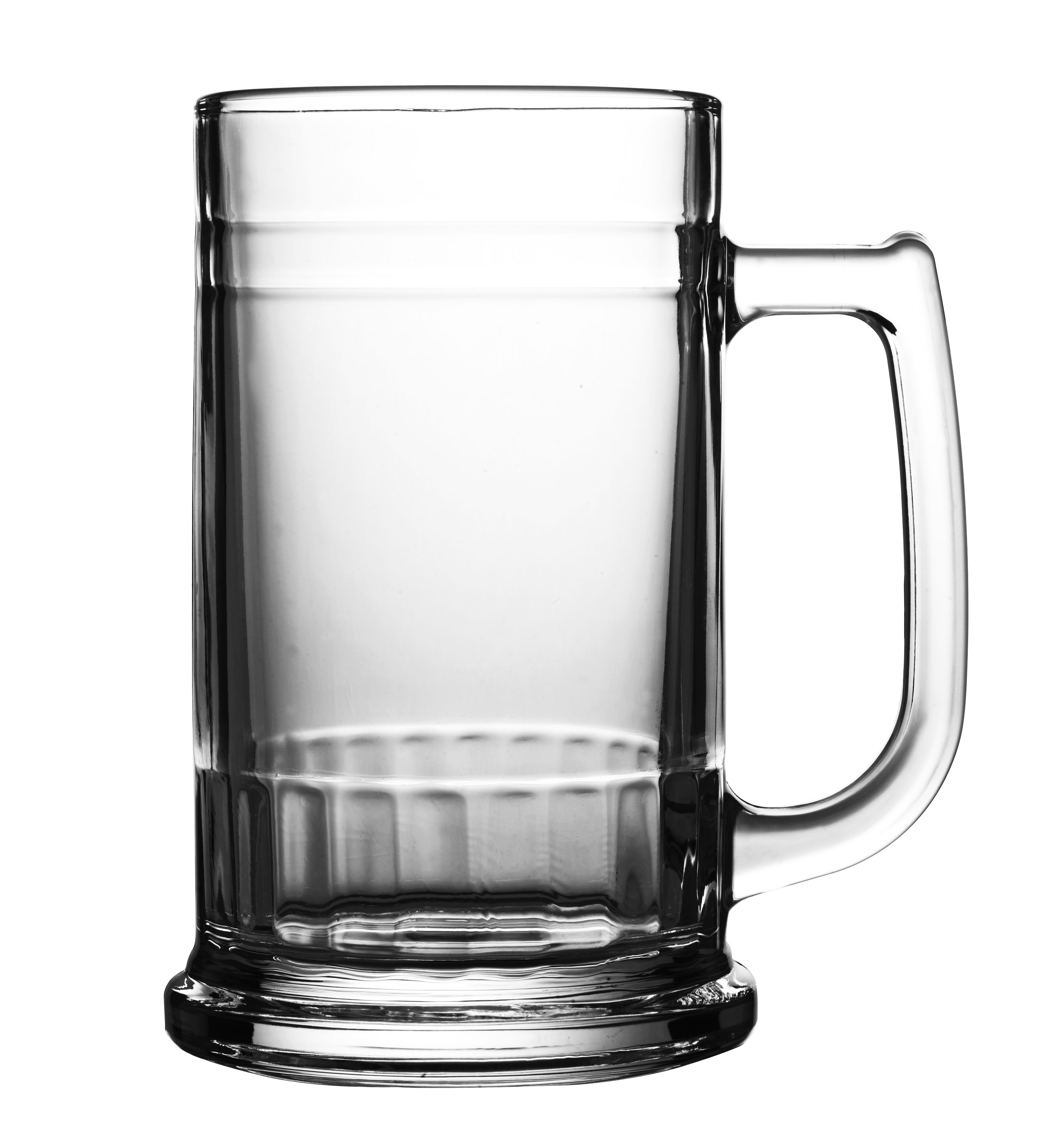
Glass tankard

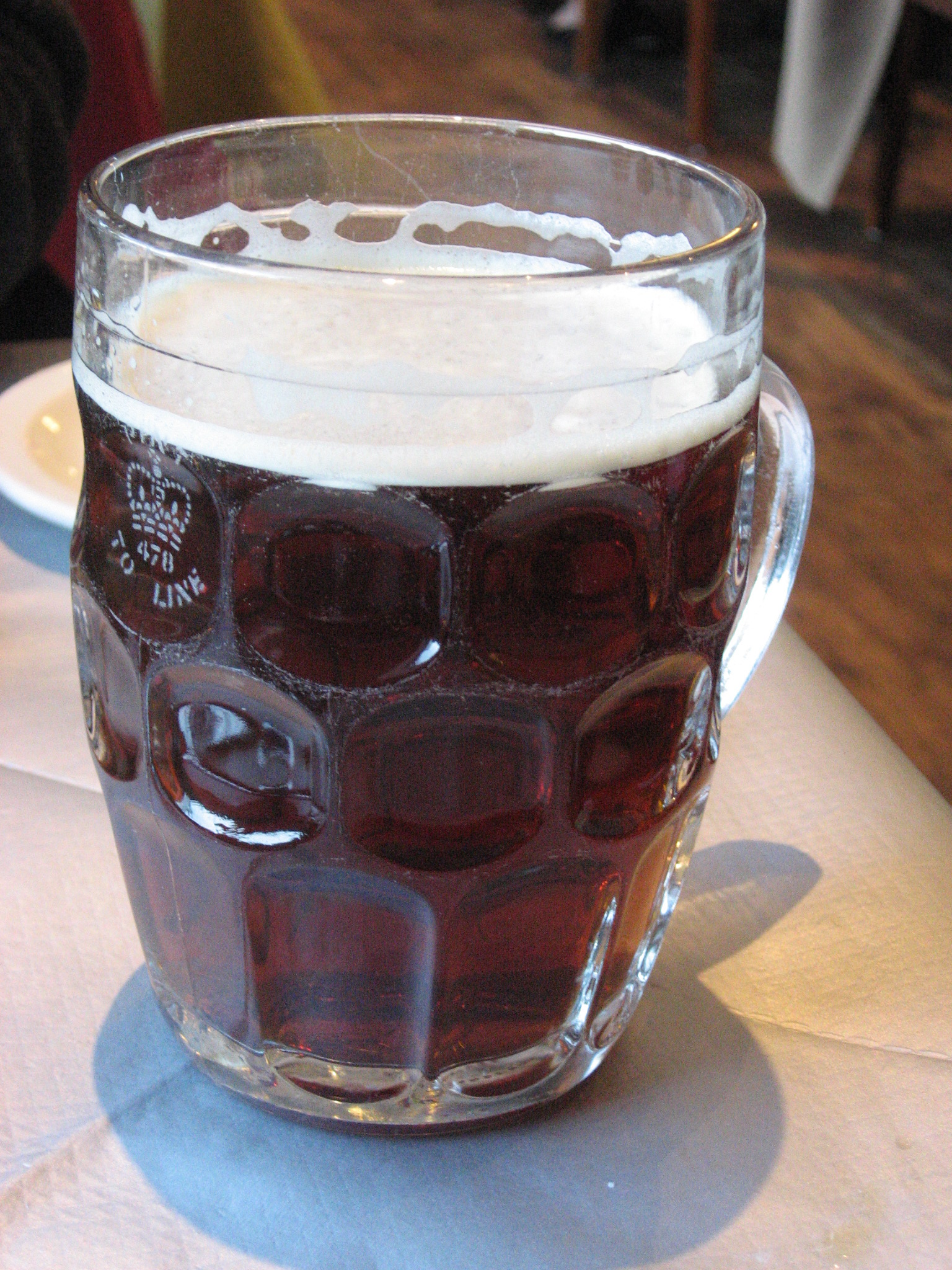
British dimpled glass pint jug

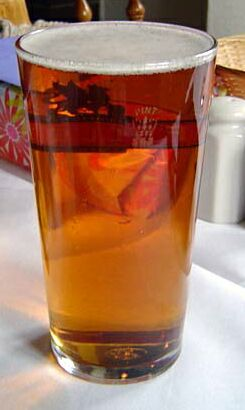
"Conical" pint glass

"Nonic" pint glass.

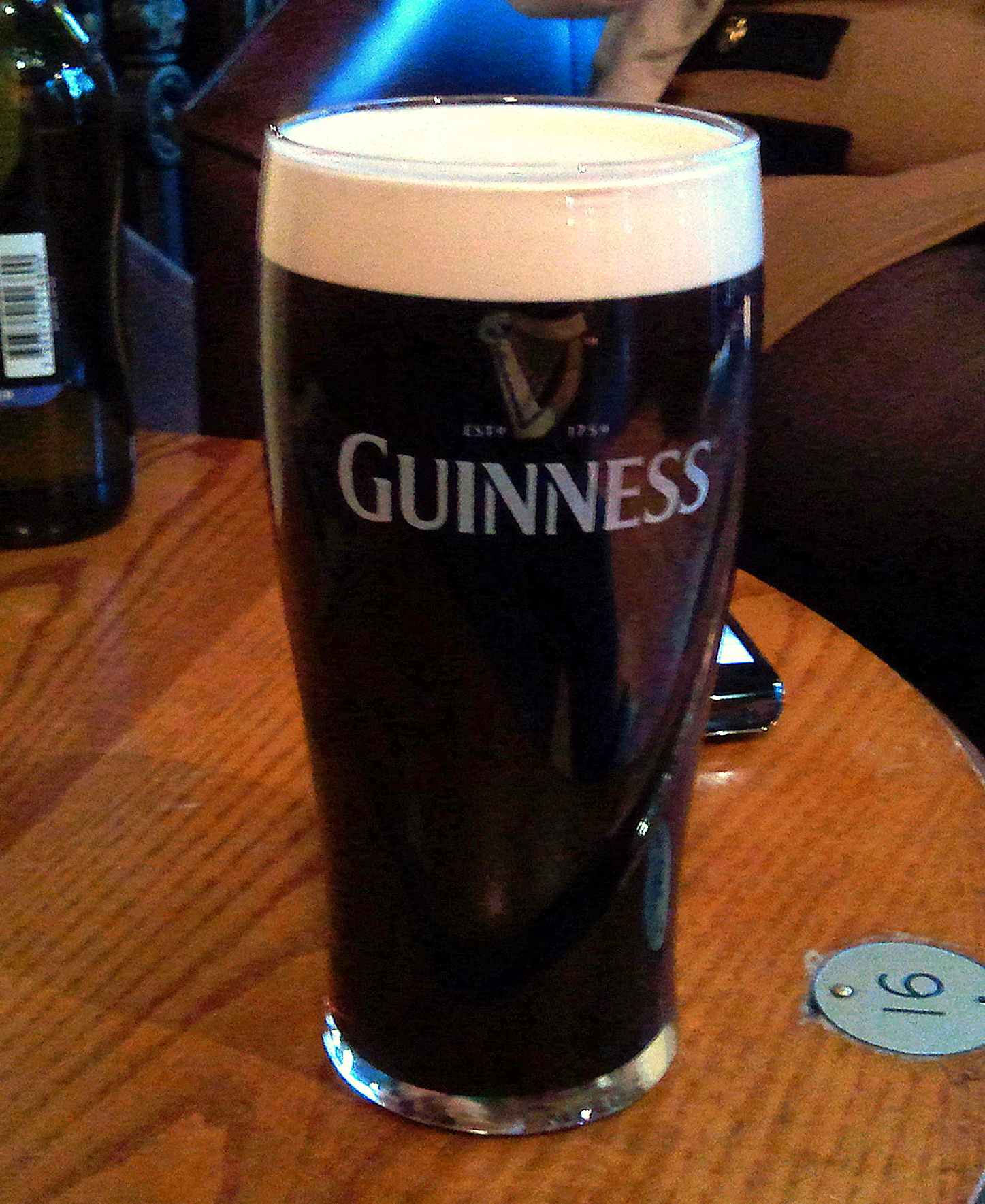
Current Guinness glass

== Brewing ==
=== Ingredients ===
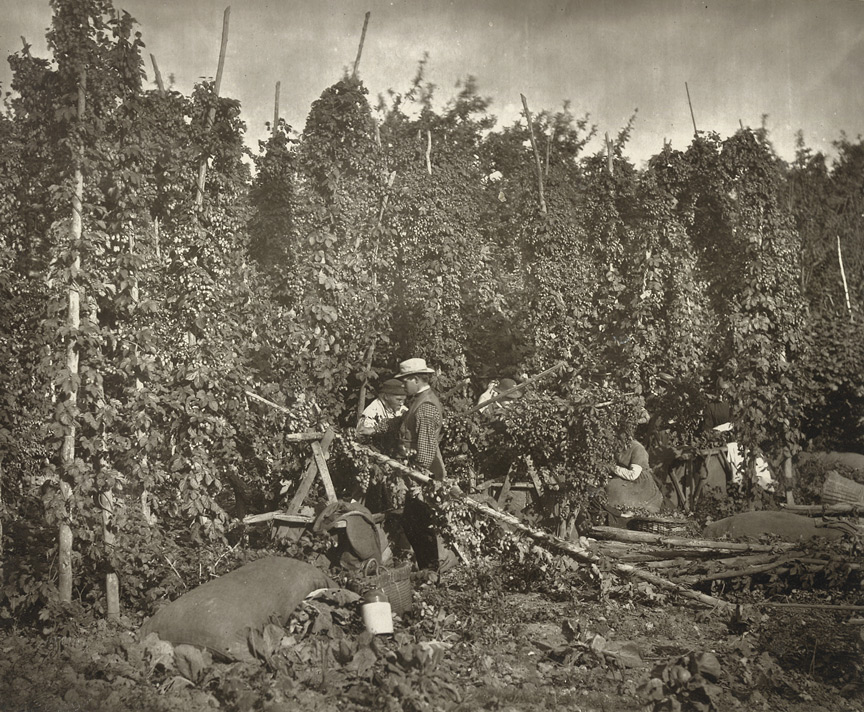
Hop picking in Kent, 1875. Hop picking was a working holiday for Londoners

The most celebrated English hop varieties are Fuggles and Goldings, although commercial pressures may incline brewers to use higher-yielding modern varieties. Modern brewers also sometimes make use of American or Continental hops. South-east England, particularly Kent, is the traditional hop growing area; brewers in the north and west used to economise on the cost of importing hops by producing beers with more of a malt character, a regional distinction that has not entirely vanished. A characteristic technique is dry hopping, where hops are added during the fermentation phase in addition to those that went into the initial boil. Worcestershire and Herefordshire has also been a major hop-growing area. The jargon of the areas is distinguished from that of Kent in certain words. Thus in Kent the drying house is known as an oast-house, in Worcestershire as a kiln, a hop-field is called a hop-garden, in Worcestershire a hop-yard.

Maris Otter is the most celebrated barley used in a brewing malt. Malts can be treated in a number of ways, particularly by degrees of roasting, to obtain different colours and flavours. Oats, wheat malt or unmalted barley may also be included in the mash.

Water—known as "liquor"—is an important ingredient in brewing, and larger breweries often draw supplies from their own wells. Burton upon Trent (see below) is famed for the suitability of its water for brewing, and its mineral balance is often artificially copied.

Top-fermenting yeasts stay on the surface of fermenting beer whilst active, hence top-fermented beers tend to be less naturally clear than lagers and finings are sometimes used to clarify them. Modern breweries carefully maintain their own distinctive strains of yeast.

English brewers are allowed a free hand in the use of adjuncts which can include honey, ginger and spices, although this practice is not common.

=== Breweries ===
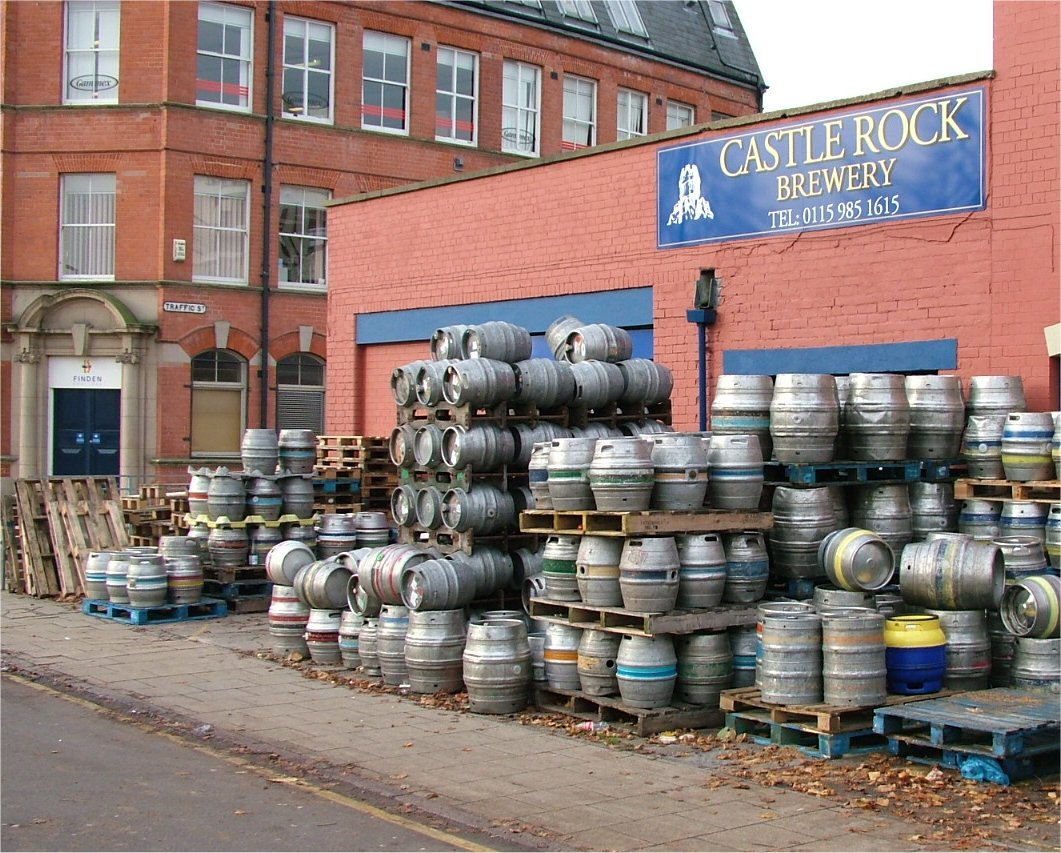
Firkins outside the Castle Rock microbrewery in Nottingham

English brewing is often considered to have a four-tier structure.

- International megabreweries: Anheuser-Busch InBev, Molson Coors, Heineken, Guinness and Carlsberg
- National breweries Greene King, Marston's and Wells and Young's. These are "new" nationals, formed by mergers and takeovers of former regional breweries. The old "big six" national breweries (Whitbread, Scottish and Newcastle, Bass Charrington, Allied Breweries, Courage Imperial and Watneys) were all absorbed into international corporations.
- Regional breweries, often owned and run by successive generations of a family. Elgood's Brewery, Wisbech is an example.
- Microbreweries and brewpubs, a volatile sector that has undergone considerable expansion in the past 30 years.

=== Brewpubs ===
In Britain during the 20th century most of the traditional pubs which brewed their own beer in the brewhouse round the back of the pub, were bought out by larger breweries and ceased brewing on the premises. By the mid-1970s only four brewpubs remained, All Nations, The Old Swan, the Three Tuns and the Blue Anchor.

Brewpubs subsequently resurged, particularly with the rise of the Firkin pub chain, most of whose pubs brewed on the premises, running to over one hundred at peak. However, that chain was sold and eventually its pubs ceased brewing their own beer. The resulting decline in brewpubs was something of a boon to other forms of microbrewing, as it led to an availability of trained craft brewers and brewing equipment.

British brewpubs are not required to double up as restaurants, as is the case in some jurisdictions. Many specialise in ale, whilst others brew continental styles such as lager and wheatbeer. Current examples of small independent brewpubs are The Ministry of Ale, Burnley; The Masons Arms, Headington, Oxford; The Brunswick Inn, Derby; The Watermill pub, Ings, Cumbria; The Old Cannon Brewery, Bury St Edmunds and Fernandes Brewery Tap & Bier Keller, Wakefield.

=== The tie ===
After the development of the large London porter breweries in the 18th century, the trend grew for pubs to become tied houses which could only sell beer from one brewery (a pub not tied in this way was called a free house). The usual arrangement for a tied house was that the pub was owned by the brewery but rented out to a private individual (landlord) who ran it as a separate business (even though contracted to buy the beer from the brewery). Another very common arrangement was (and is) for the landlord to own the premises (whether freehold or leasehold) independently of the brewer, but then to take a mortgage loan from a brewery, either to finance the purchase of the pub initially, or to refurbish it, and be required as a term of the loan to observe the solus tie. A growing trend in the late 20th century was for the brewery to run their pubs directly, employing a salaried manager (who perhaps could make extra money by commission, or by selling food).

Most such breweries, such as the regional brewery Shepherd Neame in Kent, which claims brewing lineage back to 1698 and Young's in London, control hundreds of pubs in a particular region of the UK, whilst a few, such as Greene King, are spread nationally. The landlord of a tied pub may be an employee of the brewery—in which case he would be a manager of a managed house, or a self-employed tenant who has entered into a lease agreement with a brewery, a condition of which is the legal obligation (trade tie) only to purchase that brewery's beer. This tied agreement provides tenants with trade premises at a below market rent providing people with a low-cost entry into self-employment. The beer selection is mainly limited to beers brewed by that particular company. A Supply of Beer law, passed in 1989, was aimed at getting tied houses to offer at least one alternative beer, known as a guest beer, from another brewery. This law has now been repealed, but while in force it dramatically altered the industry.

The period since the 1980s saw many breweries absorbed by, or becoming by take-overs, larger companies in the food, hotel or property sectors. The low returns of a pub-owning business led to many breweries selling their pub estates, especially those in cities, often to a new generation of small chains, many of which have now grown considerably and have a national presence. Other pub chains, such as All Bar One and Slug and Lettuce offer youth-orientated atmospheres, often in premises larger than traditional pubs.

A free house is a pub that is free of the control of any one particular brewery. Free houses can, but do not necessarily, serve a varied selection range of guest beers. Some pub chains do so as well.

=== Burton upon Trent ===
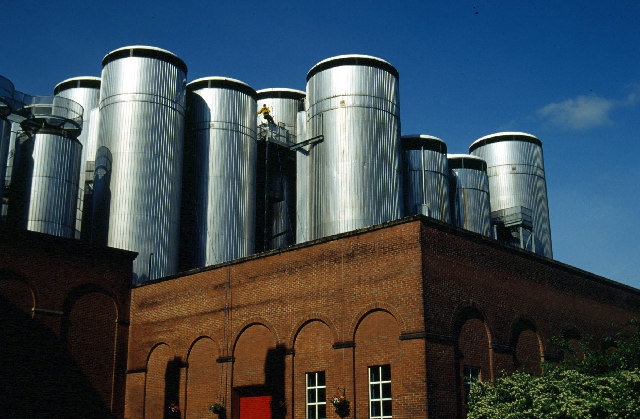
Coors Brewery, Burton-upon-Trent

For centuries, Burton upon Trent has been associated with the brewing industry due to the quality of the local water (from boreholes, not from the River Trent). This comes from the high proportion of dissolved salts in the water, predominantly caused by the gypsum in the surrounding hills; the resulting sulphate brings out the hops—see Burtonisation. Much of the open land within and around the town is protected from chemical treatment to help preserve this water quality.

The town is still home to seven brewers:

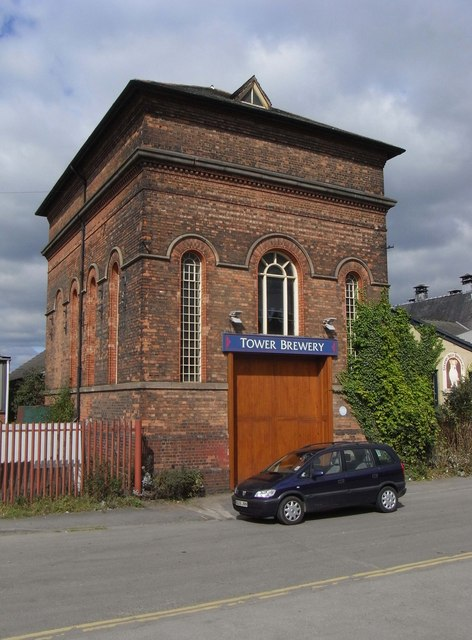
The Tower microbewery

- Coors, a brewery from the United States which produces Carling. In addition to their large-scale plant, Coors also operate the White Shield Brewery, a microbrewery producing a number of speciality beers, including the eponymous Worthington White Shield.
- Marston, Thompson and Evershed, now Marston's PLC. Marston's also brew Bass beer and Stones Bitter under licence from Anheuser-Busch InBev
- Burton Bridge Brewery, a small brewery founded in 1982 by Geoff Mumford and Bruce Wilkinson.
- Tower Brewery, a microbrewery
- Cottage Brewery, its retail outlet being the nearby Old Cottage Inn
- Black Hole Brewery, a microbrewery subsidiary of Kammac, a cask supplier

The Bass Museum of Brewing—renamed the Coors Visitor Centre after Coors took over the brewery—continued until June 2008. This was reopened in 2010 as the William Worthington Brewery and its ales—including Worthington Red Shield, White Shield, and "E", are primarily sold through the on-site Brewery Tap outlet.

A by-product of the brewing industry, figuratively and literally, is the Marmite factory in the town: Marmite being made from spent brewer's yeast. Together with the breweries this can give the area a distinctive smell.

A pale and well hopped style of beer was developed in Burton in parallel with the development of India Pale Ale elsewhere. Previously, Englishmen had drunk mainly dark stout and porter beers, but pale ale came to predominate. Burton came to dominate this trade, and at its height one quarter of all beer sold in Britain was produced here. Although over thirty breweries are recorded in 1880, a process of mergers and buy-outs resulted in three main breweries remaining by 1980: Bass, Ind Coopes and Marston's.

The fame of Burton ales gave rise to the English euphemism "gone for a Burton" during World War II, meaning to be missing or have died.

The town's connection with the brewing industry is celebrated by the sculpture of the Burton Cooper in the shopping centre.

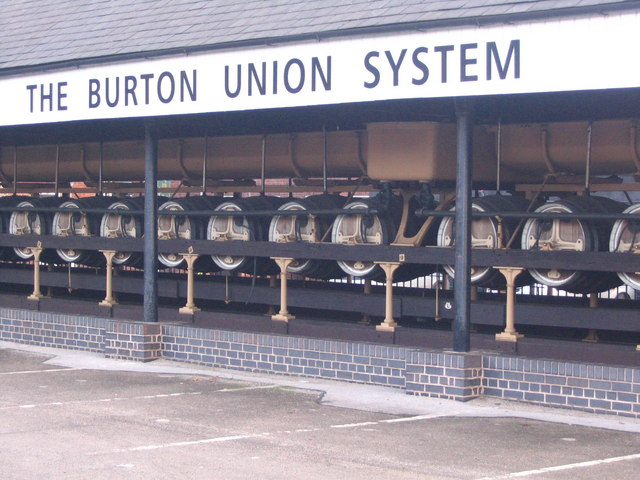
Museum Exhibit of the Burton Union Fermentation System

Burton upon Trent is also known in beer technology circles for the Burton Union recirculating fermenter system, now used only by Marston's Brewery (all other Burton brewers have switched to stainless steel).

=== Home brewing ===
Since 1963 it has been legal to brew any amount of beer at home, without a licence, providing it is not sold. Home brewing is a reasonably popular hobby, with many towns having home brew shops. Ale is usually brewed, the required equipment being simpler than that for lager.

=== Breweriana ===
Breweriana refers to any article containing a brewery name or brand name, usually in connection to collecting them as a hobby. Examples include beer cans, bottles, openers, tin signs, coasters, beer trays, wooden cases and neon signs.

== Advocacy and organisations ==
- The British Beer and Pub Association represents large brewers.
- The Independent Family Brewers of Britain represents regional brewers. It campaigns in favour of the Tie.
- The Campaign for a Fair Pint are an organisation of publicans campaigning against the Tie.
- Perfect Pint – website and mobile application allowing users to search and share information about great Real Ales based on personal tastes, location and current pubs availability
- The Society of Independent Brewers represents small brewers.
- The Campaign for Real Ale (CAMRA) represents consumers
- Cask Marque is a voluntary accreditation scheme that allows publicans to display a special symbol indicating that their cask ale is of good quality, as judged by a series of surprise inspections.
- Real ale's most enthusiastic fans are hobbyists known as tickers or scoopers who try to outdo each other in sampling as many varieties as possible. They are not known to be organised.

== See also ==
- List of breweries in England
- Beer in the United Kingdom
- Beer in Wales
- Beer in Scotland
- Beer in Ireland
- Beer in Sussex
- Beer in the Netherlands
