= Tynemill =

British pub chain

Castle Rock, known until 2007 as Tynemill is a British pub chain based in Nottingham and the East Midlands. It was founded in 1977 by former Campaign for Real Ale (CAMRA) chairman Chris Holmes. Their first pub was the Old King Arms in Newark. They have won the "Pub Group of the Year" award in 2002, 2006, and 2008.

They operate several pubs or cafe bar establishments which all have a policy of selling cask beers from regional and local microbreweries. They also own and operate the Castle Rock Brewery, a microbrewery located in Nottingham. The old Tynemill brand name for the pubs has now been replaced by Castle Rock.

Many of their establishments are run as tenancies rather than managed public houses.

== Tynemill pubs ==
=== Castle Rock Group of Pubs ===
- Alexandra Hotel, Derby
- Bread and Bitter, Mapperley
- Derby Tup, Whittington Moor, Chesterfield
- Eagle, Boston
- Forest Tavern, Nottingham
- Golden Eagle, Lincoln
- Kean’s Head, Lace Market, Nottingham
- Lincolnshire Poacher, Nottingham
- New Barrack Tavern, Owlerton, Sheffield
- Newshouse, Nottingham
- Poppy and Pint, Lady Bay, Nottingham
- Stratford Haven, West Bridgford, Nottingham
- Vat & Fiddle, Nottingham

=== Associated companies ===
- Victoria Hotel, Beeston – Hands on Pub Company Ltd
- Reindeer Inn, Hoveringham – Hoveringham Inns Ltd
- Canalhouse, Nottingham – Breakthrough Point Ltd
- Swan in the Rushes, Loughborough – Swan in the Rushes Ltd
