= Beer Orders =

Pair of UK Statutory Instruments

Supply of Beer (Tied Estate) Order 1989
- Statutory Instrument
- Parliament of the United Kingdom
- Citation: SI 1989/2390

Dates
- Made: 19 December 1989
- Commencement: 19 December 1989
- Revoked: 17 January 2003

Other legislation
- Made under: Fair Trading Act 1973
- Revoked by: Supply of Beer (Tied Estate) (Revocation) Order 2002

Status: Revoked

Text of statute as originally enacted

Supply of Beer (Loan Ties, Licensed Premises and Wholesale Prices) Order 1989
- Statutory Instrument
- Parliament of the United Kingdom
- Citation: SI 1989/2258

Dates
- Made: 1 December 1989
- Laid before Parliament: 4 December 1989
- Commencement: 1 May 1990
- Revoked: 10 February 2003

Other legislation
- Made under: Fair Trading Act 1973
- Revoked by: Supply of Beer (Loan Ties, Licensed Premises and Wholesale Prices) (Revocation) Order 2003

Status: Revoked

Text of statute as originally enacted

The Supply of Beer (Tied Estate) Order 1989 (SI 1989/2390) and the Supply of Beer (Loan Ties, Licensed Premises and Wholesale Prices) Order 1989 (SI 1989/2258), commonly known as the Beer Orders, were statutory instruments made by the United Kingdom Secretary of State for Trade and Industry in December 1989.

== Background ==
At the end of the 1980s, six national brewers dominated the market for beer sold in pubs in the UK. These were Allied, Bass, Courage, Grand Metropolitan, Scottish & Newcastle and Whitbread.

This prompted concerns about lack of competition for consumers. In 1989, a report titled "The Supply of Beer: A report on the supply of beer for retail sale in the United Kingdom" was published by the Competition Commission. The report contained a number of adverse findings related to the vertical integration between brewing and pub retailing, and made recommendations aimed at loosening the tie between pub retailing and brewing to facilitate easier entry by, and increasing competition between, brewers, wholesalers and pub retailers.

== The orders ==
The orders restricted the number of tied pubs that could be owned by large breweries in the United Kingdom to 2,000, and required large brewer landlords to allow a guest beer to be sourced by tenants from someone other than their landlord. The industry responded by spinning off purely pub-owning companies ("pubcos"), such as Punch Taverns, Enterprise Inns, and Admiral Taverns, from the older brewing-and-owning companies (notably Allied Lyons, Bass, and Scottish & Newcastle). Other companies were established such as Pub Estates Group to purchase some of the pubs for sale. By the end of 1992, Whitbread had sold almost 2,500 pubs, as a result of the orders.

== Revocation ==
The Beer Orders were revoked in January 2003, by which time the industry had been transformed from the position in the 1980s. A House of Commons report in 2004 found that "Under any of the market definitions we have chosen, no one company, be it pubco, brewer or retail pub chain, holds a dominant position in the total market for beer".

== See also ==
- Pubs Code etc. Regulations 2016
- Tied Pubs (Scotland) Act 2021
