= Spingo =

Blue Anchor beermat with logo

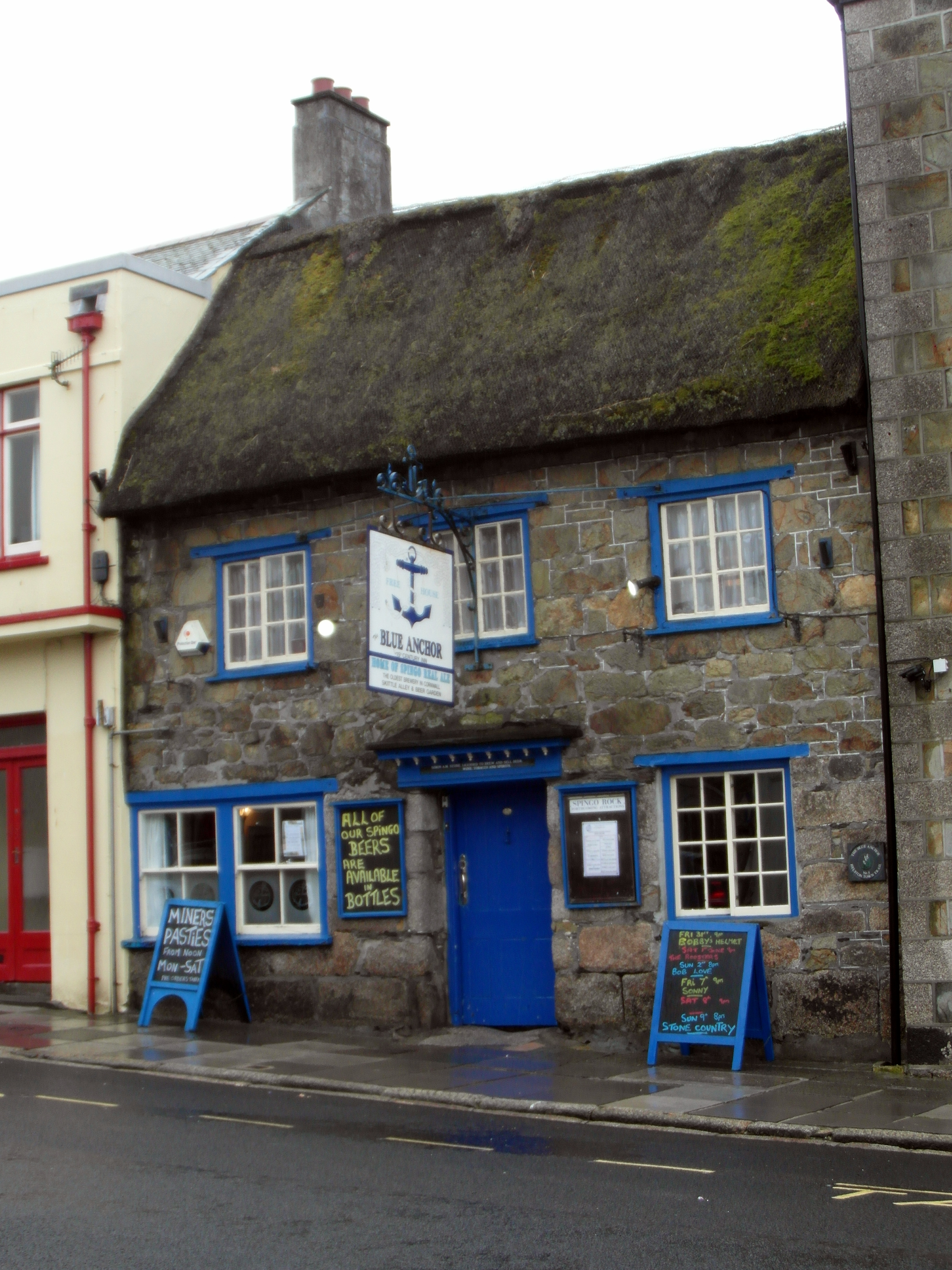
The Blue Anchor Inn, Helston

Spingo (meaning strong beer in Old English) is a generic name for a collection of beers brewed solely in the brewery of the Blue Anchor Inn in Coinagehall Street, Helston, Cornwall, England, UK.

== Varieties ==
Spingo IPA 4.5% ABV

A hoppy IPA that was originally brewed for Queen Elizabeth II's Golden Jubilee in 2002 and is described as having a "clean hoppy taste".

Spingo Middle 5.0% ABV

A traditional sweet Cornish bitter, originally brewed to welcome home those men who fought in the First World War. It is described as "mid brown with a fruity hint". Also available in bottles.

Spingo Bragget 6% ABV

Brewed without the addition of hops, this old ale is sweet, being made with honey and balanced out with apples. Originally brewed in 2001 to celebrate the anniversary of Helston's first charter, which was granted in 1201; it is described as "deceptively smooth, with a sweet taste".

Spingo Special, 6.5% ABV

A bitter, brewed for the first time to celebrate the marriage of Prince Charles and Lady Diana Spencer, described as "Dark in colour and sweet in taste".

Spingo Christmas / Easter Special 7.4% ABV

A seasonal brew.

Spingo Flora Daze 4.0% ABV

A well hopped beer, finished with aroma hops.

== Coinage Hall ==
Opposite the Blue Anchor Inn, and in the middle of the main street, was situated Helston's Coinage Hall, where tin was brought for coinage under the stannary system.
