= Guest beer =

In 1989, licensing legislation passed by Margaret Thatcher's Conservative government made it possible for a tied pub to stock at least one guest beer from a different brewery.

The Monopolies and Mergers Commission was concerned that the market concentration of the big six brewers at 75% represented a monopoly situation. The Supply of Beer (Tied Estate) order of 1989 (better known as the "Beer Orders") allowed publicans freedom to buy non-beer drinks from any source (not just the controlling brewery) and to sell at least one draught beer from a different brewery.

In addition to this, many of the larger brewers were forced to sell many of their pubs off, with the intention that they would become free houses or pass on to smaller brewers, hence increasing choice and free trade. One consequence of this legislation was that the brewers sold off their less-profitable pubs.

Following a Government review in 2000, the Beer Orders were revoked by early 2003. Although no longer required, it is still common for pubs offering real ale to offer rotating guest beers from breweries other than the supplier of their standard range of ales, to offer variety to their customers.
