= Tied house =

Pub tied into a specific brewery

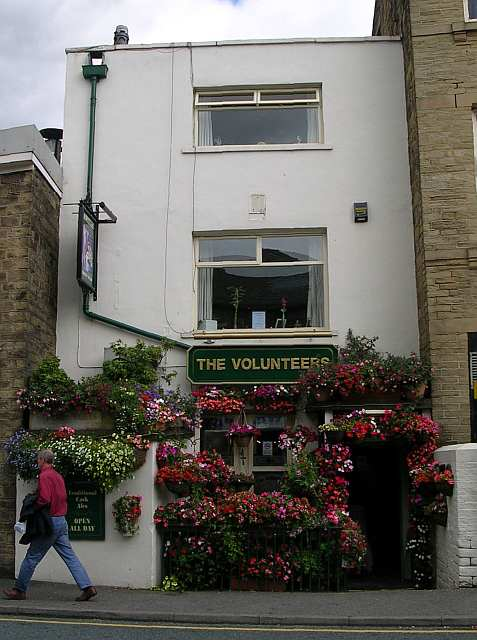
The Volunteers pub in Keighley, Yorkshire, was tied to the local Timothy Taylor Brewery from 1859 until 2013

In the United Kingdom, a tied house is a public house required to buy at least some of its beer from a particular brewery or pub company. That is in contrast to a free house, which is able to choose the beers it stocks freely.

A report for the UK government described the tied pub system as "one of the most inter‐woven industrial relationships you can identify in the UK, with multiple streams of payments running in both directions, from the pub tenant to the pubco and vice versa, generally negotiated on a pub‐by‐pub basis."

== Free and tied houses ==
The pub itself may be owned by the brewery or pub company in question, with the publican renting the pub from the brewery or pub company, termed a tenancy. Alternatively, the brewery may appoint a salaried manager while retaining ownership of the pub; that arrangement is a "managed house". Finally, a publican may finance the purchase of a pub with soft loans (usually a mortgage) from a brewer and be required to buy the beer from it in return. The traditional advantage of tied houses for breweries was the steadiness of demand they gave them; a tied house would not change its beer supplier suddenly so the brewer had a consistent market for its beer production.

However, the arrangement was sometimes disadvantageous to consumers, such as when a regional brewer tied nearly every pub in an area so that it became very hard to drink anything but its beer. This was a form of monopoly opposed by the Campaign for Real Ale, especially when the brewer forced poor beer onto the market from the lack of competition from better breweries. Some or all drinks were then supplied by the brewery, including third party spirits and soft drinks, quite often at an uncompetitive price relative to those paid by free houses. From 1989 to 2003, some tied pubs in the UK were legally permitted to stock at least one guest beer from another brewery to give greater choice to drinkers.

== Outside the United Kingdom ==
=== Canada ===
In Canada, alcohol laws are the domain of the provinces. Tied houses were eventually banned in all provinces in the aftermath of the repeal of total alcohol prohibition. In the 1980s the concept of the Brew Pub or Microbrewery was introduced to Canada beginning in the Province of British Columbia. Through the 1980s and 1990s this concept expanded to other provinces but was not a return to fully tied houses in the traditional sense. Very few alcohol producers or distributors survived prohibition, creating a concentrated market ripe for abuses. For example, in British Columbia in 1952 there were “no licensed restaurants or private liquor stores and only about 600 bars and clubs” compared to “over 9000 licensed establishments, including 5,600 restaurants” in 2011. A proposal to loosen the restrictions was put forward by the government of BC in 2010, in response to these changes, but regulation to implement the law was still under debate in 2012.

=== United States ===
In the late 19th and early 20th centuries, saloons across the United States were often tied houses, with breweries having exclusive contracts with drinking establishments, including helping business start-ups. Competition was fierce among competing breweries' tied houses within cities. This system ended with the enactment of nationwide Prohibition in the United States in 1919.

Although Prohibition was repealed in 1933, the Twenty-first Amendment to the United States Constitution grants the states broad power to regulate the alcoholic beverage industry. Tied-house restrictions have been construed as forbidding virtually any form of vertical integration in the alcoholic beverage industry. As the Supreme Court of California explained in a landmark 1971 decision:

Following repeal of the Eighteenth Amendment, the vast majority of states, including California, enacted alcoholic beverage control laws. These statutes sought to forestall the generation of such evils and excesses as intemperance and disorderly marketing conditions that had plagued the public and the alcoholic beverage industry prior to prohibition . . . By enacting prohibitions against "tied-house" arrangements, state legislatures aimed to prevent two particular dangers: the ability and potentiality of large firms to dominate local markets through vertical and horizontal integration . . . and the excessive sales of alcoholic beverages produced by the overly aggressive marketing techniques of larger alcoholic beverage concerns . . . . The principal method utilized by state legislatures to avoid these antisocial developments was the establishment of a triple-tiered distribution and licensing scheme . . . Manufacturing interests were to be separated from wholesale interests; wholesale interests were to be segregated from retail interests. In short, business endeavors engaged in the production, handling, and final sale of alcoholic beverages were to be kept 'distinct and apart' . . . . In the era when most tied-house statutes were enacted, state legislatures confronted an inability on the part of small retailers to cope with pressures exerted by larger manufacturing or wholesale interests . . . Consequently, most of the statutes enacted during this period (1930–1940) manifested a legislative policy of controlling large wholesalers; the statutes were drafted in sufficiently broad terms, moreover, to insure the accomplishment of the primary objective of the establishment of a triple-tiered system. All levels of the alcoholic beverage industry were to remain segregated; firms operating at one level of distribution were to remain free from involvement in, or influence over, any other level.

In recent years, several major alcoholic beverage makers have been successful in securing very specific exceptions to California's strict tied-house laws.
