= Pub chain =

Corporate ownership or franchising of pubs

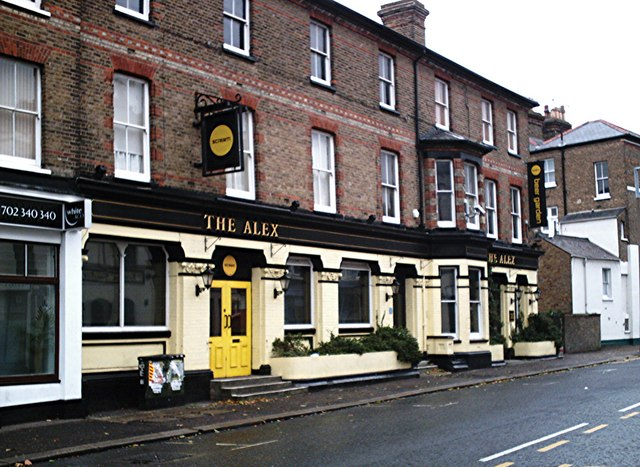
The Alex in Southend-on-Sea is an example of a chain pub - in this case a "Stonegate Pub company" managed pub targeted at university students.

A pub chain is a group of pubs or bars operating under a unified brand image. Pubs within a chain are tied houses and can, generally, only sell products which the chain owner sanctions. Pubs in a chain normally display their chain branding prominently and may also feature shared aspects, such as menus and staff uniforms.

Pub chains can exist as a stand-alone operation, often called a pubco, or can be a division of a larger company, such as a brewery.

== History ==
Pub chains are an evolution of the tied house system. During the latter half of the nineteenth century increased competition between breweries led many of them to buy up local pubs in an attempt to secure markets for their products. Although tied houses had existed in some cities since the seventeenth century, this period has come to be known as the birth of the tied house system. As well as securing markets for their own products, this system provided an efficient supply chain directly from the brewery to the pub; cutting costs for breweries and allowing complete and uninterrupted control over quality.

Most tied houses today are owned by non-brewing pub chains, known as pubco's. A key difference between this, and the traditional tied house system, is that pubco's align themselves with specific brewers in order to obtain big discounts; reducing profits for breweries and restricting their ability to control the quality of the end product.

== Types ==
In the United Kingdom, there are two types of pub chain, reflecting the ownership of the pub and the style of operations. Pubs are either tenanted or managed.

Marston's Brewery and Stonegate Pub Company are two of the largest pub chains in the UK operating multiple brands of branded pubs.

Pub chains such as Punch Taverns and Ei Group own thousands of tenanted pubs which are not branded to retain uniqueness. They are controlled in the brands of beer, ales and lagers and sometimes other beverages that they may sell.

Pub chains operating managed houses are frequently run as brands, located near a high street but rarely in predominantly residential areas.

Multiple-held pubs do exist in countries other than the United Kingdom, but due to most countries having different accepted systems of ownership and supply, they do not hold anywhere near the level of control over the market as they do in the UK.

== See also ==
- List of pub chains
