= Ringwood Brewery =

Brewery in Ringwood, Hampshire, England

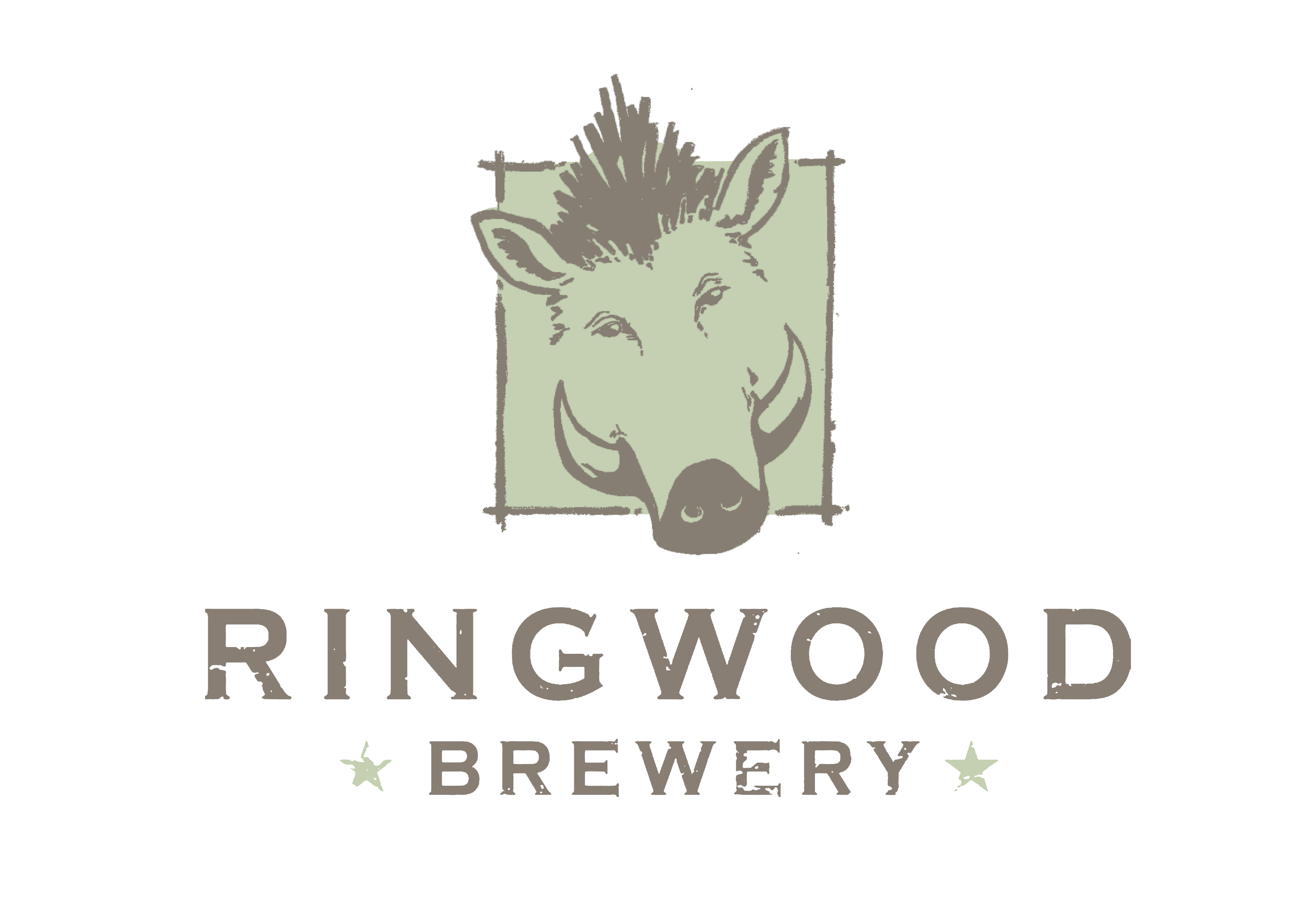
- Industry: Brewing
- Founded: 1978
- Founder: Peter Austin (brewer)
- Defunct: 2024
- Fate: Shut by Carlsberg Marston's Brewing Company (CMBC)
- Headquarters: 138 Christchurch Road, Ringwood, England
- Key people: Peter Austin (brewer), David Welsh, Nigel Welsh, Alan Pugsley
- Products: Beer
- Production output: 42,000 barrels (2013)
- Parent: Carlsberg Marston's Brewing Company (CMBC)
- Website: www.ringwoodbrewery.co.uk

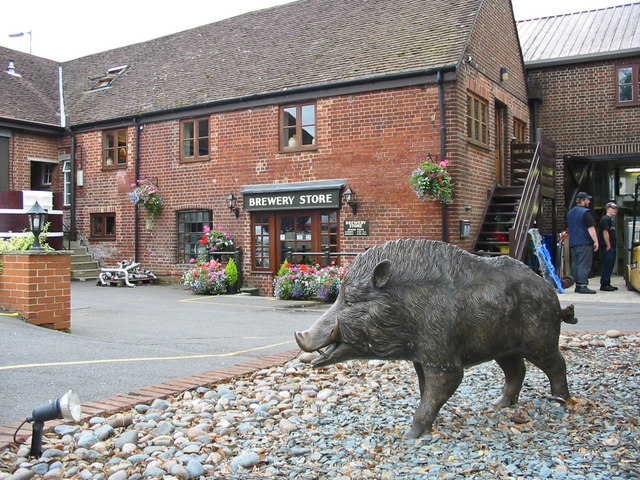
Ringwood Brewery

Ringwood Brewery was a brand of beer owned by Carlsberg Marston's Brewing Company, and was formerly a small brewery on the edge of the New Forest in Hampshire, England, near the Dorset border. It produced mainly cask ales and some bottled beers.

The emblem for the brewery is a boar.

== History ==
There are records from the early 19th century of four breweries, one owned by a banker named Stephen Tunks, that stood on the site of the present day Ringwood Brewery. Of the four, none survive today. The last to close was Carters on West Street, in 1923.

In 1975 the former head brewery of Hull Brewery, Peter Austin retired to Hampshire to enjoy more time sailing after a career at Hull dating back to 1945, preceded by a pupillage at Friary, Holroyd and Healy in Guildford, and a brief spell at Morrell's Brewing Company in Oxford. However the retirement was not to last and Austin was keen to pursue new ventures. An invitation two years later by Terry Jones of Monty Python fame and journalist; Richard Boston to create a micro brewery in an ex-cattle byre at Penrhos Court, Penrhos, Herefordshire reignited Austin's interest in brewing.

In 1978, Peter Austin and Partners Limited established Ringwood Brewery and started brewing in an old bakery at Mintey's Yard, New Street, Ringwood in April of that year. Austin was an influence on Britain's craft brewery rebirth in much the same way that Fritz Maytag of San Francisco's Anchor Brewing Company and Pierre Celis of Belgium's Hoegaarden Brewery were to their countries. However, Austin had a much more direct role in brewery development through his consulting business and equipment sales. Several American craft brewers use his Original Peter Austin Brick Kettle Brewing System including Geary's Brewing, Shipyard and Middle Ages Brewing Company. The equipment sales part of the business was separated from the main Ringwood Brewery company in 1982.

In 1980, Austin became the first chairman of the Small Independent Brewers' Association.

Austin later brought in two business partners: David and Nigel Welsh. The business continued to expand with the purchase of a number of pubs and in 1986, having outgrown their existing brewery, the company moved to the site on Christchurch Road, historically previously part of Stephen Tunk's Brewery.

In 1988, the brewery was awarded 'Champion Beer of Britain' by the Campaign for Real Ale (CAMRA), for 'Old Thumper'. Peter Austin sold his shares in Ringwood to David Welsh in 1990, becoming a brewing consultant.

In 1989, an enquiry by the Monopolies and Mergers Commission into the brewing industry resulted in the Beer Orders requiring large brewers to restruct their number of tied pubs to 2,000 and to those tied pubs to stock at least one guest beer. This allowed tenants to buy an ale from a different brewer other than their landlord. This transformed Ringwood's output and between 1990 and 1994 production rose from 5,000 barrels per annum to 13,000 barrels per annum. The brewhouse was extended to accommodate this from 1994, with a further extension taking place in 1999 to allow more than one brew per day.

By the mid-1990s Ringwood had allowed Old Thumper to be brewed under license in the United States. Licensing was pursued in an effort to export their products to America, and was felt a more secure approach after two failed attempts in the mid and late 1980s. Alan Puglsey, a former Ringwood Brewery employee was the brewer for this through his brewery, Shipyard Brewery in Portland, Maine. Pugsley has called Austin a "surrogate father in many, many ways".

Ringwood branched out from brewing in 1997 with the purchase of the Château de Fayolle and its vineyard near Saussignac in the Dordogne region of France. The vineyard produced several varieties of wine including Semillon, Sauvignon Blanc, Cabernet Sauvignon, Merlot and Cabernet Franc. Further diversification took place with the purchase of several local public houses, number 7 in total by 2007.

In 2007, Ringwood was purchased from David Welsh by Marston's plc for £19.2 million. Marston's stated that they would keep the brewery in operation and continue producing the full range of Ringwood beers.

Marston's sold Château de Fayolle and the vineyard in 2011.

In 2013, Ringwood underwent a full re-brand, and the ABV of Old Thumper was reduced from 5.6% to 5.1%.

In 2015, Ringwood Best Bitter was rebranded as Ringwood Razorback.

In May 2020, it was announced that subject to competition law and shareholder approval, Marston's would merge its brewing business, including Ringwood Brewery, with Carlsberg UK (the United Kingdom arm of Carlsberg Group), into a joint venture to be known as Carlsberg Marston's Brewing Company (CMBC), valued at £780m. Marston's took a 40% stake in the joint venture and received c.£273m in cash.

In June 2023 the brewery and its brands were put up for sale by CMBC, who announced the closure of their logistics base in Ringwood as part of the same announcement. The Campaign for Real Ale called it "another example of a globally owned business wiping out UK brewing heritage".

On 4 December 2023, CMBC announced they had failed to find a buyer for the brewery and Ringwood Brewery would close in January 2024. Production of the Ringwood Brewery beers was to be moved to other facilities owned by CMBC. Cask brewing of Razorback, Fortyniner and Boondoggle would be moved to The Park Brewery in Wolverhampton (Banks's), whilst cask brewing of Old Thumper cask brewing would go to The Marston's Brewery in Burton upon Trent. Razorback, Boondoggle and Fortyniner bottles were already brewed in Burton. The Ringwood CMBC logistic base had already been moved to CMBC's sites in Tiverton and Farnborough.

Controversy arose soon after however when The Salisbury Journal reported on 6 December 2023 that a potential purchaser condemned CMBC's decision to close the site. CMBC stated they had been "unable to secure a credible offer which met our bidding threshold"; however, the threshold was not disclosed. A follow up article in the Morning Advertiser quoted local businessman, Anthony Swift, as saying that CMBC had not engaged or even responded to an indicative offer he had put forward together with a consortium during the sale process.

The brewery shop closed on Christmas Eve 2023.

Marston's sold their stake in CMBC for £206 million in July 2024, in order to reduce debts and to allow it to concentrate on running its pub estate across the country. The sale gave Carlsberg UK full control of CMBC and ended Marston's 150 year heritage in brewing. A review of brewing activities was undertaken as a result of the sale and in November 2024 CMBC announced it was to delist Boondoggle and Old Thumper as cask ales by the end of the year, although confirming that Boondoggle would remain available as a bottled beer.

As of March 2025, the former site of Ringwood Brewery in Hampshire was still lying empty. In October 2025, it was reported that Carlsberg Britvic, the successor to Carlsberg UK, had sold the site to Pennyfarthing Homes, a property developer, which would turn it into its new office headquarters.

== Beers ==
=== Permanent ales ===
- Razorback (previously Best Bitter) – 3.6% - Bitter - Launched 1978, rebranded 2015
- Forty Niner – 4.9% - Golden Ale - Launched 1978
- Old Thumper – 5.1% - Strong Ale, used to be as strong as 6%, then 5.8%, now 5.1% - Launched 1979
- Boondoggle – 4.2% - Blonde Beer - Launched 1997
- Circadian – 4.5% - IPA - Launched 2016

=== Seasonal ales ===
- Filly Drift - 4.7% - Bitter
- Groundhog - 4.0%
- Huffkin - Autumn Ale - Launched 2002
- Lovey Warne - 4.2% - Golden Ale
- Mauler - 3.9% - Golden Ale
- Old Scrumper - 4% - Bitter
- Porker - 5.2% - Blonde Ale
- Red Boar - 3.9% - Red Ale
- Ring O The Bells - 5% - Dark Ale
- Scuttle Butt - 4.0% - Amber ale
- Showman's Tipple - 3.8% - Bitter
- Shy Giant - 4.5% - NE IPA
- Three Sheets - 4.6% - Red Ale
- Wild Boar - 4% - Bitter
- XXXX Porter - 4.7% - Porter - Launched 1980
- Young Scrumper - 4.0% - Blonde ale

=== Commemorative ales ===
- Royal Match - A traditional strong ale brewed to a special gravity of 1052 - Special brew produced in 1981 to commemorate the Wedding of Prince Charles and Lady Diana Spencer.
- True Glory - 4.5% - Amber Ale - Special brew first produced in 1995 to commemorate the fiftieth anniversary of VE Day.
- Twenty One Not Out - Special brew produced in 1999 to commemorate the twenty first anniversary of the brewery.
- Bold Forester - Special brew produced in 2003 to commemorate the twenty fifth anniversary of the brewery.
- Seventy Eight - 4.2% - Spring Ale - Special brew produced in 2008 to commemorate the thirtieth anniversary of the brewery. Brewed again in 2018 to commemorate the fortieth anniversary of the brewery.

== Pubs ==
All pubs were transferred to Marston's after the brewery was purchased in 2007.

- Drovers Inn, Gussage All Saints - Purchased January 2000
- Porterhouse, Poole Road, Westbourne (Originally The Old Thumper) - Opened 1984
- The Angel, Market Street, Poole - Purchased 2001
- The Boot, High West Street, Weymouth - Purchased 1998
- The Cartwheel, Whitsbury
- The Crown, Winterborne Stickland
- The Inn on the Furlong, Meeting House Lane, Ringwood - Flagship - Opened 1985
