= Hull Brewery =

Brewery in Hull, East Riding of Yorkshire, England

Hull Brewery was founded in 1888 in Hull, England. It was taken over by Northern Foods in 1972 and by Mansfield Brewery in 1985.

== Gleadow and Dibb ==
In 1782 Thomas Ward and John Firbank built a brewery on the corner of Posterngate and Dagger Lane. Ward's granddaughters, Ann and Mary, inherited the brewery. Mary married shipbuilder Robert Gleadow in 1796, and their son, Robert Ward Gleadow, continued the brewing business. In 1846 Gleadow went into partnership with another brewer, William Thomas Dibb, to form Gleadow, Dibb and Co. Gleadow died in 1857 and was succeeded by his son, Henry Cooper Gleadow. Gleadow, Dibb and Co. became a limited company in 1885.

== Anchor brewery ==
In 1866 Gleadow, Dibb and Co. started work on a new, purpose-built brewery in Silvester Street. This entailed demolishing the existing buildings there; fixtures and fittings from these were sold at auction in February 1867. Builders were invited to tender for the construction work in March 1867, and the company moved to the new premises in 1868. The new brewery had the capacity of fermenting 24,000 gallons of wort at a time. William Thomas Dibb died in 1886 on a journey between Bridlington and Hull; he had rushed to catch a train at Bridlington, causing the guard to stop the train so that he could board. By the time the train arrived in Driffield he was found dead, still sitting upright in his seat. Frederic Gleadow was elected to the board of directors to replace him. The company continued to expand.

== The Hull Brewery Company Limited ==
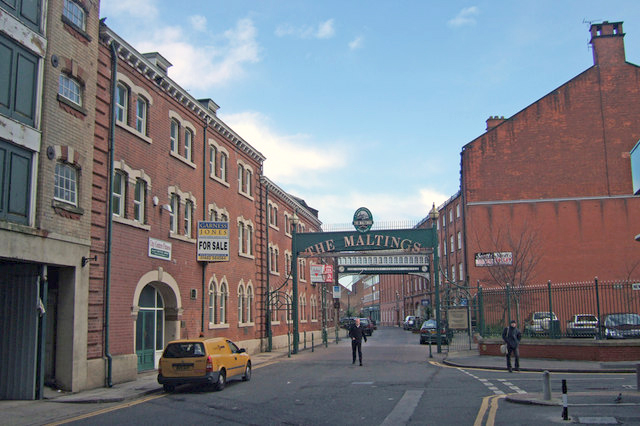
The Maltings, a new development on the site of the Anchor Brewery. The bridge (visible behind "The Maltings" sign) connected two of the brewery buildings

In 1887 Gleadow, Dibb and Co. Ltd. was wound up, and a new company, "The Hull Brewery Company Limited", was formed. The company embarked on a period of increased expansion, acquiring other brewers and bottlers, purchasing licensed houses and enlarging the Silvester Street site. By 1890 they were recorded as owning 160 licensed houses. Trade dropped off during the First World War, but by 1919 the company was able to buy two more local breweries along with their public houses. In 1925, it acquired Sutton, Bean and Company, a Lincolnshire brewery. Beer was transported by barge across the Humber.

The Second World War led to another drop in trade, and many of the company's properties were damaged or destroyed during the Hull Blitz. The Silvester Street brewery, however, remained intact, possibly because the German bomber pilots used its chimneys as a landmark.

Small Independent Brewers’ Association founding chairman Peter Austin joined the company in 1945 as third brewer, before becoming head brewer. He retired in 1975, though would later come out of retirement to found Ringwood Brewery.

In 1949 Hull Brewery began producing "Anchor Export", a strong beer, designed to keep and travel well so that it could be taken aboard ships as part of their provisions. It was sold in bottles and cans.

The company was taken over by Northern Dairies in 1972 and the name was changed again to North Country Breweries. However, by 1982, due to the decline in consumption and the changing tastes of the beer-drinking public, the parent company decided to divest, and North Country Breweries was purchased by Mansfield Brewery. Brewing at the Silvester Street site ceased in 1985.
