= List of breweries in Maine =

Allagash Brewing Company is located in the Riverton area of Portland, Maine

Breweries in Maine produce a wide range of beers in different styles that are marketed locally, regionally, and nationally. Brewing companies vary widely in the volume and variety of beer produced, from small nanobreweries and microbreweries to massive multinational conglomerate macrobreweries.

In 2012, Maine's 43 brewing establishments (including breweries, brewpubs, importers, and company-owned packagers and wholesalers) employed 390 people directly, and more than 5,000 others in related jobs such as wholesaling and retailing. 47 people in Maine had active brewer permits in 2012. Including people directly employed in brewing, as well as those who supply Maine's breweries with everything from ingredients to machinery, the total business and personal tax revenue generated by Maine's breweries and related industries was more than $142 million. Consumer purchases of Maine's brewery products generated more than $49 million in additional tax revenue. In 2016, according to the Brewers Association, Maine ranked fifth in the number of craft breweries per capita (7.6 breweries per capita), with 77 breweries.

For context, at the end of 2016, there were 5,301 breweries in the United States, including 5,234 craft breweries subdivided into 1,916 brewpubs, 3,132 microbreweries and 186 regional craft breweries. In that same year, according to the Beer Institute, the brewing industry employed around 65,000 Americans in brewing and distribution and had a combined economic impact of more than $350 billion.

== Current breweries ==
The oldest brewery is Geary's, which was established in 1983. As of 2026, there are 172 active breweries in Maine, down from a peak of 184 in 2023. By comparison, there were 73 in 2015. 122 of the 172 are listed below.

- 2 Feet Brewing Company, Bangor, opened in 2016
- Airline Brewing Company (formerly Square Tail Brewing Company), Amherst and Ellsworth, opened in 2015
- Allagash Brewing Company, Portland (opened in 1995) and Scarborough (2025)
- Ambition Brewing, Wilton, opened in 2019
- Argenta Brewing, Portland, opened in 2024
- Atlantic Brewing Company, Bar Harbor, opened in 1990
- Austin Street Brewery, Portland, opened in 2014
- Auxiliary Brewing Company, Limington
- Ækeir Brewing, Wiscasset
- The Bag and Kettle, Carrabassett Valley, opened in 1969
- Bangor Beer Company, Bangor, opened in 2017
- Barreled Souls Brewing Company, Saco, opened in 2014
- Bateau Brewing, Gardiner, opened in 2019
- Bath Ale Works, Wiscasset, opened in 2021
- Bath Brewing Company, Bath, opened in 2018
- Batson River Brewing and Distilling, Biddeford, Kennebunk, Portland, and Wells, opened in 2018
- Battery Steele Brewing, Portland, opened in 2017
- Baxter Brewing Company, Lewiston, opened in 2010
- Belleflower Brewing Company, Portland
- Bigelow Brewing, Skowhegan, opened in 2014
- Birchwood Brewing, Gray, opened in 2018
- Bissell Brothers Brewing Company, Portland, opened in 2013
- Black Bear Microbrewery, Orono, opened in 2008
- Black Pug Brewing, Brunswick, opened in 2018
- Blank Canvas Brewery, Brewer, opened in 2015
- Blaze Brewing Company, Limington, opened in 2018
- Boothbay Craft Brewery, Boothbay, opened in 2009
- Bray's Brewing Company, Naples, opened in 2011
- Brickyard Hollow Brewing Company, Portland and Yarmouth, opened in 2018
- Bryant's Brewery, Hartland, opened in 2022
- Bunker Brewing Company, Portland, opened in 2011
- Corner Point Brewing Company, Berwick, opened in 2018
- Cushnoc Brewing Company, Augusta, opened in 2017
- DeepWater Brewing Company, Blue Hill, opened in 2012
- Definitive Brewing Company, Portland, opened in 2018
- East Outlet Brewing Company, Cambridge, opened in 2019
- Farmtown Brewing Company, Farmington, opened in 2024
- First Mile Brewing Company, Fort Kent, opened in 2017
- Flight Deck Brewing, Brunswick, opened in 2017
- Fluvial Brewing, Harrison, opened in 2019
- Fogtown Brewing Company, Ellsworth, opened in 2017
- Footbridge Brewery, Boothbay Harbor, opened in 2019
- Foundation Brewing, Portland, opened in 2014
- Freeport Brewing Company, South Portland, opened in 2000
- Frosty Bottom Brewing, Belfast, opened in 2019
- Funky Bow Brewery and Beer Company, Lyman, opened in 2013
- Furbish BrewHouse, Rangeley
- Geaghan Brothers Brewing Company, Bangor, opened in 2011
- Geary Brewing Company, Portland, opened in 1986
- Goodfire Brewing Company, Portland (opened in 2017) and Freeport (2022)
- Gordon's Grog, St. Albans
- Grateful Grain Brewing Company, Monmouth, opened in 2017
- Gritty McDuff's, Auburn and Portland, opened in 1988
- Hi-Fidelity, Portland, opened in 2020
- Horn Run Brewing, Eastport
- Island Park Brewing, Winthrop
- Jack Russell's Steakhouse and Maine Coast Brewery, Bar Harbor, opened in 1997
- Katahdin Brew Works, Patten, opened in 2022
- Kennebec River Brewery, The Forks, opened in 1996
- Kennebunk Brewing Company (Federal Jack's), Kennebunk, opened in 1992
- Knife Edge Brewing, Millinocket, opened in 2022
- Koelbus, Scarborough
- Lake St. George Brewing, Liberty, opened in 2017
- The Liberal Cup Public House and Brewery, Hallowell, opened in 2000
- Lone Pine Brewing Company, Portland, opened in 2016
- Lost Valley Brewing Company, Auburn, opened in 2017
- Lucky Pigeon Brewing, Biddeford, opened in 2018
- Maine Beer Company, Freeport, opened in 2009
- Mainely Brews, Waterville, opened 2003
- Marsh Island Brewing, Orono, opened in 2015
- Marshall Wharf Brewing Company, Belfast, opened in 2007
- Mason's Brewing Company, Brewer, opened in 2016
- Mast Landing Brewing Company, Westbrook (opened in 2016) and Freeport (2021)
- Moderation Brewing, Brunswick, opened in 2018
- Modestman Brewing Company (relocated to South Portland from Keene, New Hampshire, in 2025)
- Monhegan Brewing Company, Monhegan, opened in 2013
- Naiad County Brewery, Orland
- Newscapes Brewing, Portland, opened in 2022
- Nonesuch River Brewing Company, Scarborough, opened in 2017
- North Haven Brewing, North Haven, opened in 2017
- Northern Maine Brewing Company, Caribou, opened in 2016
- Norway Brewing Company, Norway, opened in 2016
- Oak Pond Brewing, Skowhegan, opened in 1996
- Odd Alewives Brewery, Waldoboro, opened in 2018
- Odd By Nature Brewing, Cape Neddick
- On a Plain Brewing Company, Lyman, opened in 2018
- Orange Bike Brewing, Portland, opened in 2022
- Orono Brewing Company, Orono and Bangor, opened in 2014
- Outland Farm Brewery, Pittsfield, opened in 2019
- Oxbow Brewing, Newcastle, Oxford and Portland, opened in 2011
- Peak Organic Brewing Company, Portland, opened in 2007
- Pennant Distilling and Brewing, Portland, opened in 2024
- Penobscot Bay Brewery, Winterport, opened in 2009
- Portland Zoo, Portland, opened in 2018
- The Pour Farm, Union, opened in 2018
- Rising Tide Brewing Company, Portland, opened in 2010
- River Junction Brewing, Sanford
- Rock Harbor Brewing Company, Rockland, opened in 2017
- The Run of the Mill Public House and Brewery, Saco
- Saco River Brewing, Fryeburg, opened in 2016
- Sacred Profane Brewing, Biddeford, opened in 2022
- Sasanoa Brewery, Westport Island, opened in 2018
- Sea Dog Brewing Company, Bangor, Camden, South Portland, Scarborough and Topsham, opened in 1993
- Sebago Brewing Company, Gorham, Kennebunk and Scarborough, opened in 1998
- The Send Brewing Company, South Portland, opened in 2024
- Sheepscot Valley Brewing, Whitefield, opened in 1995
- Sidereal Farm Brewery, Vassalboro, opened in 2022
- SoMe Brewing Company, York
- Steam Mill Brewing, Bethel, opened in 2018
- Stone Alley Brewing Company, Rockland
- Strong Brewing Company, Sedgwick, opened in 2013
- Sunday River Brewing Company, Bethel, opened in 1992
- Tattooed Dad Brewing Company, Jackson
- Tributary Brewing Company, Kittery, opened in 2014
- Tumbledown Brewing Company, Farmington, opened in 2014
- Turning Page Farm, Monson, opened in 2018
- Two Knights Brewing Company, Sangerville
- The Vinalhaven Community Brewery, Vinalhaven, opened in 2023
- Well & Good Brewing Company, North Yarmouth, opened in 2024
- Woodland Farms Brewery, Kittery, opened in 2017
- Xota Brewing, Waterboro
- York Beach Beer Company, York, opened in 2019

== See also ==
- Beer in the United States
- List of breweries in the United States
- List of microbreweries
