= Gritty McDuff's Brewing Company =

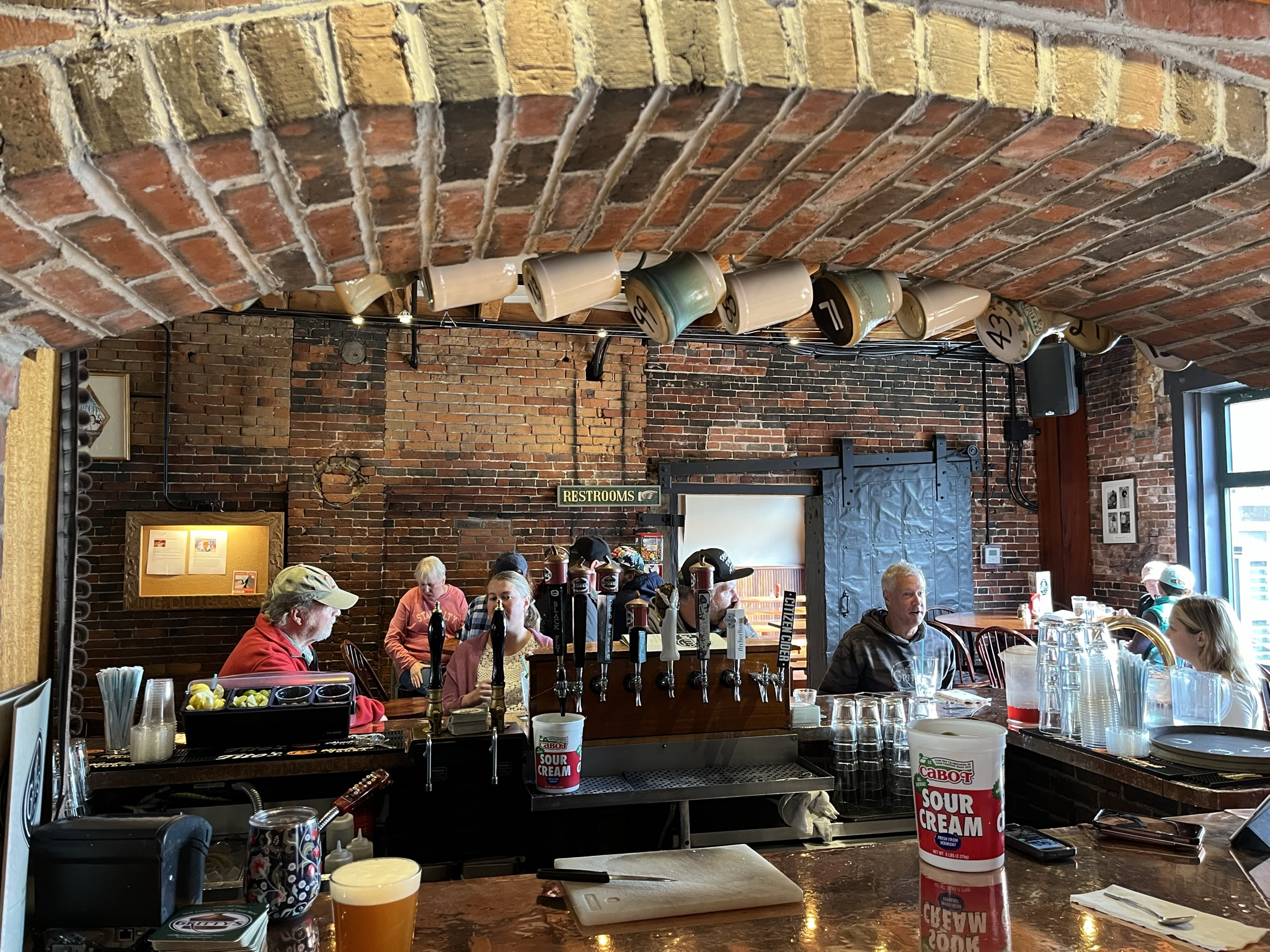
- The Portland location in 2022
- Industry: Alcoholic beverage
- Founded: 1988 (38 years ago)
- Headquarters: Portland, Maine, U.S.
- Number of locations: 2
- Key people: Ed Stebbins, brewmaster
- Products: Beer
- Owner: Richard Pfeffer; Ed Stebbins

Gritty McDuff's Brewing Company, commonly contracted to Gritty's, is a brewery, with locations in Portland and Auburn, Maine, United States.

== History ==
Gritty's began as a brewpub in Portland, Maine, founded at 396 Fore Street in 1988 by Ed Stebbins and Richard Pfeffer. The Fore Street location is considered the first brewpub to open in Maine since Prohibition ended.

In 1995, a second location with a larger brewing facility was opened in Freeport, Maine. The company experienced a downturn in sales in the late 1990s, as did most craft breweries. A third brewpub was opened in Auburn, Maine, in 2005. The company's production volume that year, 2005, was in excess of 250,000 gallons. By 2006, Gritty's was the third-largest Maine brewer, after Shipyard Brewing and D. L. Geary Brewing.

The company's Freeport location closed on November 30, 2024.

== Critical reception ==
Among the microbrews produced by Gritty's was Vacationland Summer Ale, reviewed for the Hartford Courant in 2008, and Gritty McDuff's Best Bitter. Gritty's has frequently been awarded the titles of "Maine's Best Brew Pub", "Best Maine Microbrew" and "Best Bar" in statewide polls. In 2011 Gritty's was awarded Restaurateur of the Year by the Maine Restaurant Association. Gritty's ales have been repeat winners at the annual Real Ale Festival in Chicago and have also appeared as Featured International Selections at the Great British Beer Festival.

To celebrate Gritty's 21st anniversary, the brewery released its 21 IPA. The brew was created at the Freeport brewery and originally called "Punch You in the IPA", a reference to the Phish song "Punch You in the Eye".
