= Peter Austin (brewer) =

British brewer

- Born: 18 July 1921; Edmonton, London, England
- Died: 1 January 2014 (aged 92); England
- Occupation: Brewer
- Known for: Ringwood Brewery, microbrewery pioneer
- Spouses: Joan (19??–19??); Zena (19??–19??)
- Children: 5

Peter Austin (18 July 1921 – 1 January 2014) was a British brewer. He founded Ringwood Brewery and was a co-founder and first chairman of the Society of Independent Brewers (SIBA). He built some 140 new breweries in the UK and 16 other countries.

== Early life and education ==
Peter Austin was born in Edmonton, London on 18 July 1921. He went to Highgate School, before moving back to his family's home in the New Forest in 1935. He spent two years on the British merchant navy training ship HMS Conway. His father worked for the brewing equipment supplier Pontifex, and his great-uncle had run a brewery in Christchurch.

== Career ==
Through his father's connections, Austin joined the Friary, Holroyd and Healy brewery in Guildford, before a short stint at Morrell's in Oxford. In 1945, he moved to Hull Brewery, where he eventually became head brewer.

He retired in 1975 to the south coast of England to pursue his love of sailing. However, in 1977, he was enticed out of retirement to help build Penrhos Brewery, Herefordshire, alongside Terry Jones and Richard Boston.

Austin founded Ringwood Brewery, Hampshire, in 1978, where his motto was "keep it simple, stupid". In 1979, David Bruce started his first Firkin Brewery brewpub in Elephant and Castle, London; Austin oversaw his choice of equipment and the design for its small basement brewery.

Austin was the prime mover in establishing the Society of Independent Brewers (SIBA) in 1980, and its first chairman. Under his leadership, SIBA campaigned for 20 years, without the support of any other body, for a progressive beer duty system (smaller breweries to pay less tax on their products) to be introduced in the UK. Such a system was finally adopted by the then Chancellor Gordon Brown in 2002.

By the time that Austin had retired from Ringwood Brewery, he had assisted in helping start 40 new UK breweries in a decade. After that, he worked internationally, in the US, France, China, Nigeria, and Russia, among others, building some 140 new breweries in 17 countries. Some used the Peter Austin Brick Kettle Brewing System.

In the US alone, 74 new breweries were built, all using his brewing system. He taught Alan Pugsley brewing, and he went on to found Shipyard Brewing Company in 1994, and later take over Sea Dog Brewing Company. Pugsley considers Austin a "surrogate father in many, many ways”, and credits him as the "godfather" of the modern microbrewery movement.

In 1990, Austin sold Ringwood Brewery to long-term business partner David Welsh. In 2023, by then owned by Carlsberg Marston’s Brewing Company, the brewery was shut, with production of some Ringwood beers moved to other sites in England.

== Personal life ==
Austin married twice. He was predeceased by both wives, Joan and Zena, and his son Henry. He was survived by his other four children, Roland, Jane, Jeremy and Sarah.
