= Mansfield Brewery =

Former brewery in Mansfield, England

Coordinates: 53.1405°N 1.1923°W

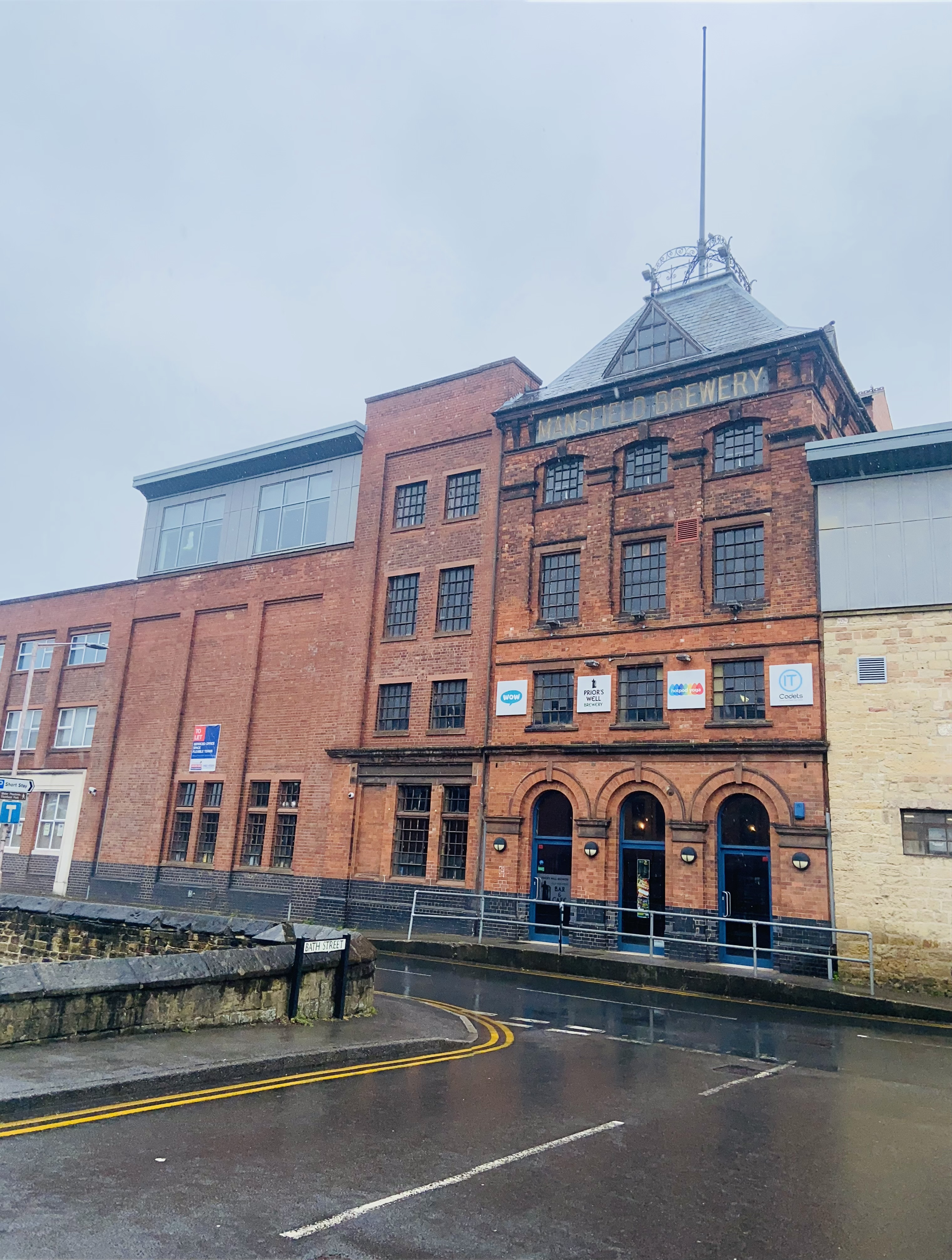
Former offices of Mansfield Brewery

Mansfield Brewery was a brewery and public house operating company established in 1855, that was based in the North Nottinghamshire market town of Mansfield, England. The main beer brewed was Mansfield Bitter, along with other popular brands including Riding Bitter, Marston Old Baily, and Marksman Lager.

The brewery also boasted a large array of seasonal beers, including the "Deakins" range.

After being taken over by Wolverhampton & Dudley Breweries in 1999, the brewing of the branded beers moved to Wolverhampton in 2002, where it continues today under the control of Marston's. The beer production buildings were demolished in 2008 and the site redeveloped for residential use in 2019–21. From the mid-2020s, the offices complex was acquired by local-based Vision West Nottinghamshire College to expand its construction facilities.

== History ==
In 1855, brewer John Watson of Sheffield formed a partnership with farmer Samuel Hage of Whitewater, Ollerton, and investor William Edward Baily, of Mansfield. The partners bought land at Littleworth to build a brewery. However, in 1856 Watson sold his shares to the other two partners. To support their business, the partners established a malting facility in 1863.

In 1873 Addison Titley bought into the business, followed in 1885 by William Jackson Chadburn, Baily's brother-in-law, who became the dominant owning partner. By 1901, the firm leased 72 licensed premises, from public houses to hotels, as well as numerous off licences, resulting in the rebuilding of the main brewery in 1907.

After W.J. Chadburn's death in 1922, from February 1925 the business became the private limited liability company The Mansfield Brewery Company Ltd. After acquiring the Chesterfield Brewery in 1934, in 1935 the company became publicly listed on the London Stock Exchange.

After World War II, the company acquired Hornby's soft drink distributors in 1955, TW Beach in 1980, and North Country Breweries (formerly Hull Brewery) of Humberside for £42m in 1985 (equivalent to £130,080,000 in 2025), including 212 tied houses. By 1987, the company was operating a total of 420 licensed premises, and was one of the area's largest employers.

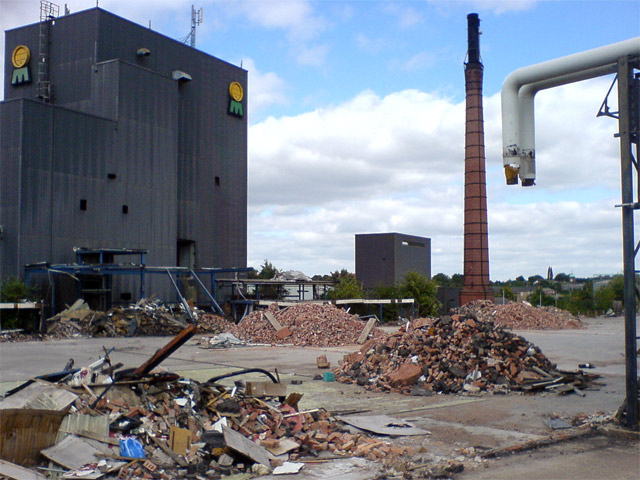
Part of the demolition site showing the chimney

In 1999 the company was taken over by Wolverhampton & Dudley Breweries, which quickly moved production to the Park Brewery in Wolverhampton. This affected the distinct flavour of the Mansfield beers which was due to the using local hard water. Brewing at Mansfield, which had been wound down after the takeover, resulted in the closure of the brewery in 2002.

The site was cleared by demolition contractors the Cuddy Group in late 2008, with many local residents feeling that the destruction of the brewery's brick chimney by twelve explosive charges brought to an end part of the town's cultural heritage, and officially marked the end of brewing in Mansfield.

There were few feelings of nostalgia from Councillor Kate Allsop who stated: "I have to say I was pleased to see the chimney finally come down. It’s been an eyesore for such a long time".

The land on which the brewery once stood was immediately put up for sale. In 2008, Mansfield District Council released blueprints, showing plans to develop the area in a mixed-use scheme, including offices, leisure facilities and residential developments. The site was temporarily used during 2015 as a trailer park, before Mansfield planning department refused further consent in October 2015.

The brownfield site was undeveloped and being marketed for commercial use, until work started in 2019 to create a residential development, which was completed by 2021.

In 2024, local-based Vision West Nottinghamshire College announced it had acquired the office complex as an additional campus to expand its construction facilities. In addition to office-suites being rented out, the building had housed a Making it! interactive educational museum, and a micro-brewery.

== Advertising ==
1980s ad for Mansfield Bitter featuring Ronald Reagan

"Not much matches Mansfield" ad

In the 1980s, Mansfield Bitter was advertised with a photograph of then US President Ronald Reagan and the tagline: "He might be president of the most powerful nation on earth... but he's never had a pint of Mansfield." "Not much matches Mansfield" was also used and became the title for a play set in the town, written by Kevin Fegan for the Mansfield Arts Festival. A similar 1989 advert contained the wording "He might be the life and soul of the Party...But he's never had a pint of Mansfield." featured Mikhail Gorbachev, then president of the Soviet Union.
