= Progressive beer duty =

Progressive beer duty is a beer duty system that allows smaller breweries to pay less tax on their products. The idea originates from Bavaria in Germany, where such a system has underpinned the brewing industry and helped support local production. This idea encourages competition in quality and variety and supports diversity in local economies. It also encourages consumer interest and product pride which in turn helps promote cultural links.

This concept was adopted by the European Union in 2002 using EU Directive 92/83/EEC as a derogated power so not all countries implemented the idea. The structure and its parameters provided by EU law allowed the creation of systems which suited the needs of individual states. There is, as some journalists have suggested, no "European system" as such. EU law allows for a maximum discount of 50% of beer tax on production levels up to 20 million litres with the provision for a stepped structure. Each country can choose the percentage and level/s of production. Germany, for instance, adopted the full 20 million L level which is appropriate considering the many different sizes of breweries within the country. The UK, on the other hand, limited the discount to 3 million L, creating a tightly targeted tax benefit. The interesting aspect of the UK system, designed by David Roberts of Pilgrim Brewery in Reigate, is that it not only provides a discount on beer tax, but also a limit to which individual companies can benefit, unlike the German version, where companies gain greater total monetary discounts on shrinking percentages as they grow, thus, in theory, disadvantaging smaller companies.

In 2020, the EU changed the excise duties directives and amongst other things requires each country to have an option to extend the application of lower tax rates for small producers. Council Directive 2020/1151 states that beer with an alcoholic content less than 0.5% abv. is not a beer and is not subject to excise duty in the EU.

In 2022, 30 out of 38 OECD countries apply a reduced tax rate on beer from small breweries, with a progressive increase in the tax rate according to their annual production in many cases.

== Countries applying progressive beer duty in 2022 ==
Countries vary in how they apply taxation, in Canada the tax applies to all producers but increases with increased production, up to 75,000 hl. Others link reductions with reductions in alcohol levels, such as Iceland and Spain, or the size of containers, such as Australia, rather than who the producer is.

- Austria ≤ 20,000 hl
- Belgium ≤ 200,000
- Canada ≤ 750,000
- Czech Republic ≤ 200,000
- Denmark ≤ 200,000
- Estonia ≤ 15,000
- Finland ≤ 100,000
- France ≤ 200,000
- Germany ≤ 40,000
- Greece ≤ 200,000
- Hungary ≤ 200,000
- Ireland ≤ 200,000
- Italy ≤ 60,000
- Japan ≤ 100,000
- Latvia ≤ 10,000
- Lithuania ≤ 10,000
- Luxembourg ≤ 200,000
- Netherlands ≤ 200,000
- Poland ≤ 200,000
- Portugal ≤ 200,000
- Slovakia ≤ 200,000
- Slovenia ≤ 20,000
- Switzerland ≤ 200,000
- United Kingdom ≤ 200,000
- United States ≤ 2,347,000

=== Germany ===
In 2021 a temporary tax reduction on production of beer by small breweries was approved, below 200,000 hl p.a. production is needed for a brewery to qualify.

=== United Kingdom ===
The Society of Independent Brewers (SIBA) campaigned alone, led by chairman Peter Austin, without support from any other body, for a progressive duty system to be introduced in the UK, for some 21 years. First appearing in the 2000 budget, the system adopted by Chancellor Gordon Brown in 2002 and which was designed by David Roberts of Pilgrim Brewery, who had actively campaigned for the introduction of the system for many years.

The initial 2000 proposal in the UK was subsequently increased in 2002 to 5,000 with taper relief up to 60,000 hectolitres, after a few smaller family brewers joined SIBA and help influence a policy change within the Society. The UK system has been criticised for creating a "glass ceiling" which hinders expansion, though the levels adopted mean that the duty discount represents a very small percentage of the duty paid at the highest levels. The scheme became known in the UK as "Small Brewers Relief" (SBR).

In August 2023 the SBR was changed to become the "Small Producers Relief" by incorporating other alcohol producing businesses.

=== United States of America ===
The system that was adopted in the United States, which stimulated the growth of microbreweries was different in that it was a flat discount on each barrel produced.

From 2020 the Federal tax rate was $3.50 per barrel on the first 60,000 barrels provided the brewery produced less than 2m barrels a year compared to the normal rate of $16 per barrel on the first 6m barrels and $18 thereafter.
