= David Geary (brewer) =

American businessman and brewer

- Born: April 19, 1945; Brighton, Massachusetts, U.S.
- Died: July 26, 2023 (aged 78); Portland, Maine, U.S.
- Education: Purdue University
- Occupations: Businessman, brewer
- Employer: Geary Brewing Company
- Spouse: Karen Geary

David L. Geary (April 19, 1945 – July 26, 2023) was an American brewer who established Geary Brewing Company, New England's first craft brewery. Because of this, he was known as the "godfather of Maine craft beer."

== Early life ==
Geary was born in Brighton, Massachusetts, in 1945 to Jack Geary and Joyce Goldman. He grew up in West Quincy. His family relocated to Portland, Maine, in 1961. He graduated Deering High School, before attending Purdue University, where he graduated with a degree in English literature. He later moved to South Portland, where he began working for Ross Laboratories. He moved again, to Westbrook.

== Career ==
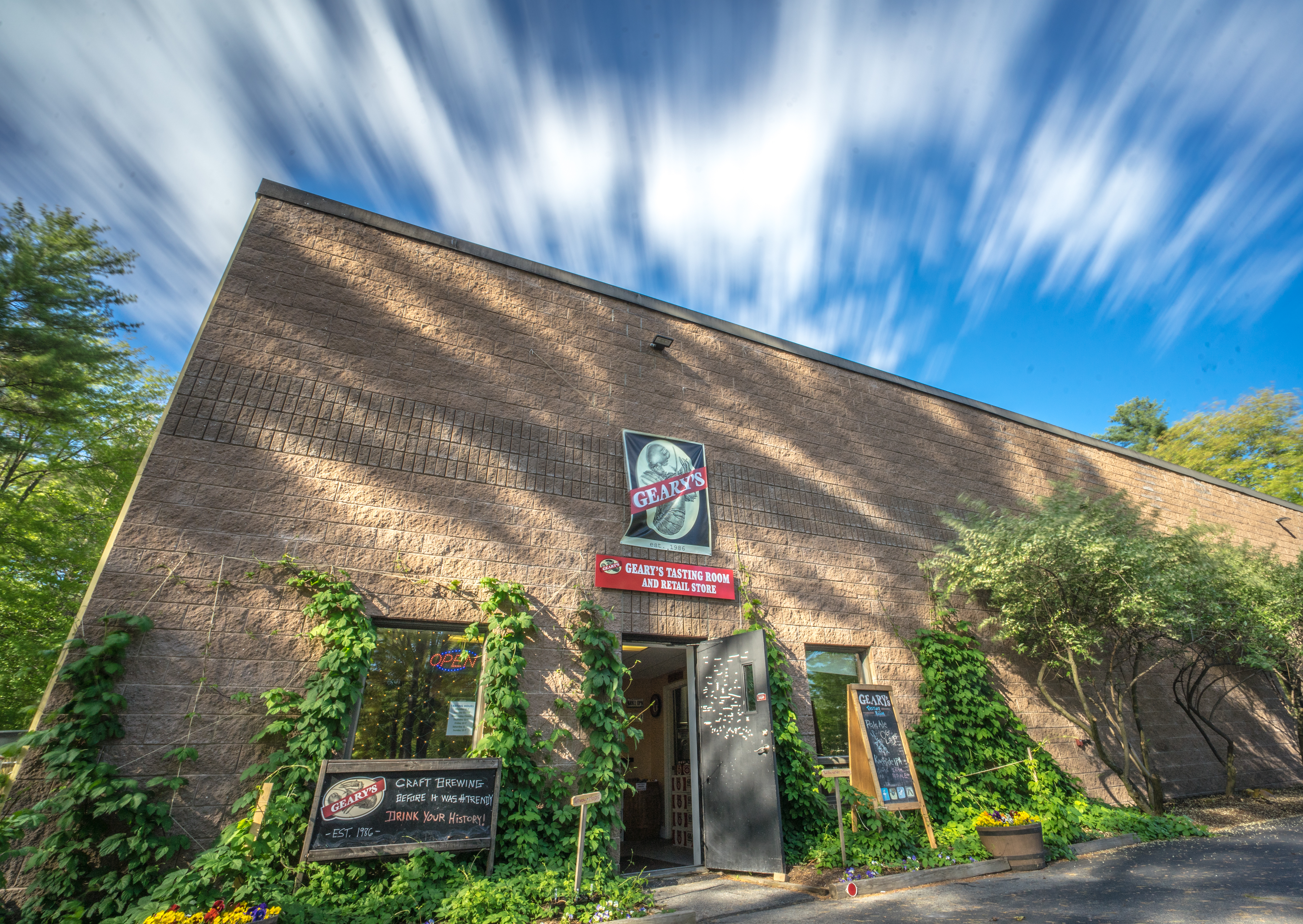
Since 1986, Geary's brewing has taken place at the original brewhouse in Portland, Maine.

After becoming a regular at Three Dollar Dewey's, in Portland's Old Port, he was introduced to lesser-known European small-batch beers by Dewey's owner Alan Eames in 1981.

Geary founded the D. L. Geary Brewing Company in 1983, when there were only thirteen microbreweries in the country. The following year, he trained and studied the art of brewing in England and Scotland, including learning from brewer Peter Maxwell Stewart.

Three Dollar Dewey's poured the first pint of Geary's Pale Ale, priced at $2.75, in December 1986. A decade later, the Finance Authority of Maine (FAME), made Geary the Entrepreneur of the Year. In 2018, the Maine Historical Society made him a Maine History Maker in 2018.

Geary sold the company in 2017.

== Personal life ==
Geary was marred to Karen, whom he met at Purdue. They had a son and daughter.

His favorite pub in Portland was Brian Boru, which closed in 2019 after 26 years in business.

== Death ==
Geary died in 2023, aged 78. He had been a widower for a decade, following his wife's death in 2013.
