= Peter Maxwell Stuart =

Scottish landowner

Peter D'Arcy Joseph Maxwell-Stuart, 20th Laird of Traquair (16 November 1922 – 1990) was a Scottish landowner. He rediscovered the 18th-century brewery at Traquair House and became a noted brewer.

He was the father of Catherine Maxwell Stuart, 21st Lady of Traquair.

== Early life ==
Stuart was born in Glasgow, Scotland, in 1922, to Francis Joseph Maxwell-Stuart, 19th Laird of Traquair, and Dorothy Mary Hartley.

== Career ==
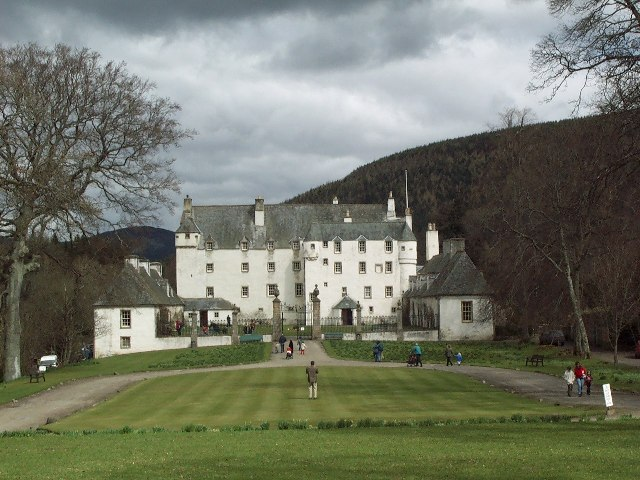
Traquair House

Stuart was an officer in the British Indian Army and a managing director at Vickers.

In the early 1960s, he rediscovered the 18th-century brewery at Traquair House and began brewing beer using the original equipment. Some of the oak barrels were over 200 years old.

David Geary, who established D. L. Geary Brewing Company in the United States in 1983, worked as an intern under Stuart to learn the craft of brewing. Geary began distributing Stuart's Traquair House Ale in 1984.

== Personal life ==
In 1956, Stuart married Flora Carr-Saunders, daughter of Sir Alexander Carr-Saunders, with whom he had a daughter, Catherine, in 1964. She became the 21st Lady of Traquair.

== Death ==
Stuart died in February 1990, aged 68.
