= The Village Cafe =

- John and Amedeo Reali outside the Newbury Street entrance in the 1970s
- Interactive map of The Village Cafe

Restaurant information
- Established: 1936
- Closed: 2007 (19 years ago)
- Previous owners: Vincenzo Reali; Amedeo Reali; John Reali
- Dress code: Casual dress
- Location: 112 Newbury Street, Portland, Maine, 04101, United States
- Coordinates: 43.66128665°N 70.2493035°W
- Seating capacity: 550

The Village Cafe was a 550-seat family-owned Italian restaurant in Portland, Maine, United States. It was in business, at 112 Newbury Street, for 71 years (1936–2007) and was one of the few restaurants in the Old Port during the restaurant's existence. It stood across Hancock Street from the Shipyard Brewing Company, in a space now occupied by condominiums—The Village at Ocean Gate—which maintain The Village's name.

== History ==
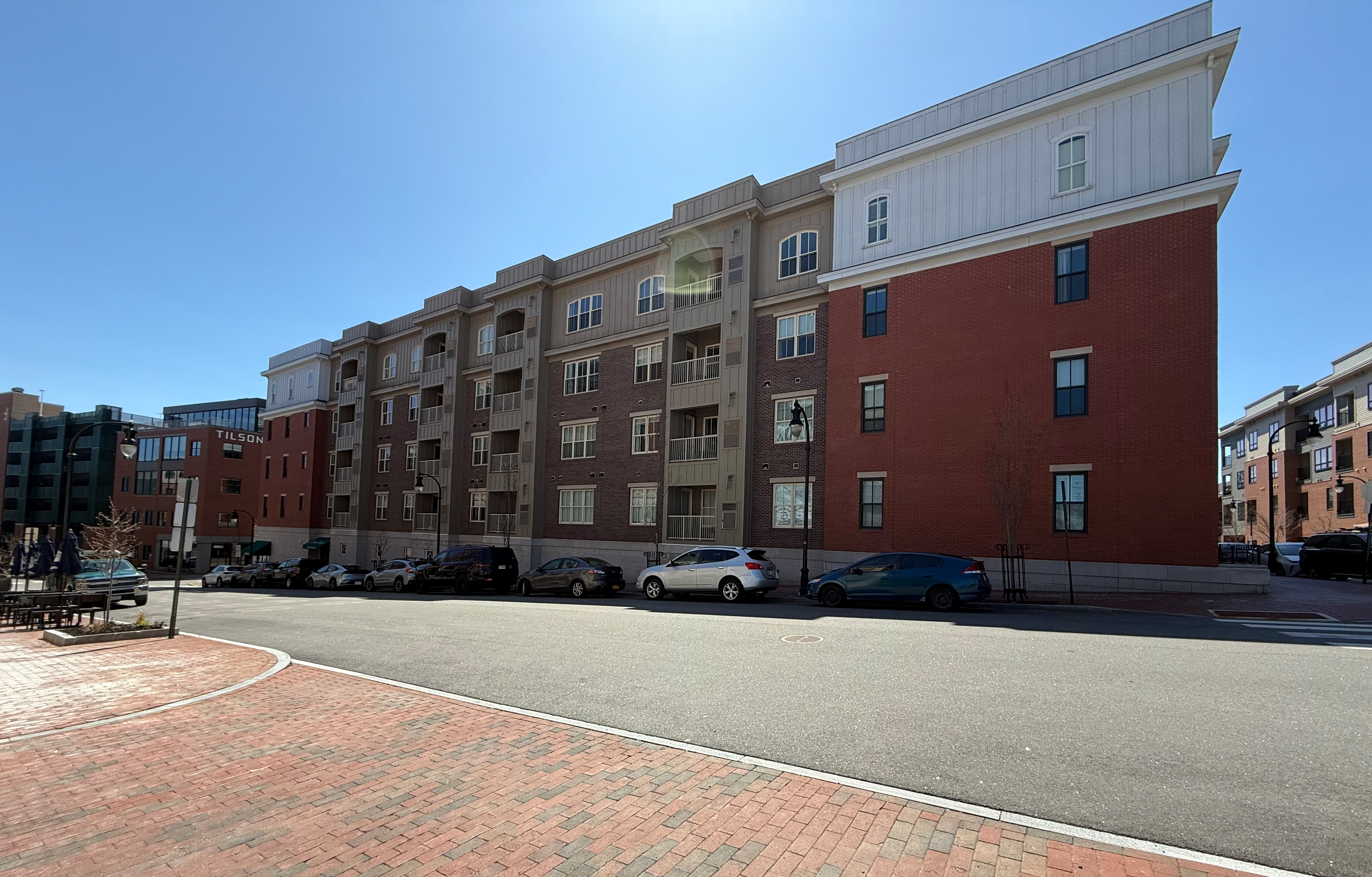
The former site of the restaurant, pictured from Hancock Street in 2025

The restaurant was founded as a twenty-seat café in 1936 by Maria (1884–1967) and Vincenzo Reali (1892–1981), the grandfather of the restaurant's last owner, John Reali. Amedeo Reali (1926–2010), John's father, took it over, with co-owner Albert DiMillo Sr., after Vincenzo's retirement. He had initially only planned on helping out for two weeks upon returning from service in the Navy during World War II. The restaurant was expanded in 1973 and renovated in 1998.

John Reali won the Restaurateur of the Year Award from the Maine Restaurant Association in 2001. Amedeo Reali won the Lifetime Achievement Award in 2004.

After increasing competition from the numerous restaurants opening to take advantage of Portland’s "foodie town" status, the restaurant's owner decided to close the business, rather than spend an estimated $500,000 on work the building needed. It was under contract in 2006 and sold in 2007. There was a plan to downsize the restaurant and include it on the first floor of the condominium, but this did not come to fruition. In December 2007, after 71 years in business, the restaurant closed.

Amedeo Reali died in 2010, aged 83.

In the 2010s, the restaurant was torn down and replaced with the Bay House condominium project. The Bay, an 85-unit condo on Middle, Hancock and Newbury Streets, was built by Reger Dasco Properties. Since then, the neighborhood has been filled in with high-end condos, hotels and offices. In 2021, a one-unit condo in the Bay House was listed for sale for $625,000.

== Menu ==
The Village Cafe served a traditional menu of Italian food. The menu listed soups, salads, Italian specialties, pastas, pizzas, seafood, steaks, sandwiches, and desserts. Menu listings that have been remembered by customers are veal parmigiana, clam sauce, red sauce, homemade bread, baked stuffed haddock, and eggplant parmigiana.

Two menus from the restaurant in 1982 and in 1989 are included in the collection of menus at the Portland Public Library.
