= Posterngate, Hull =

Street in Hull, East Riding of Yorkshire, England

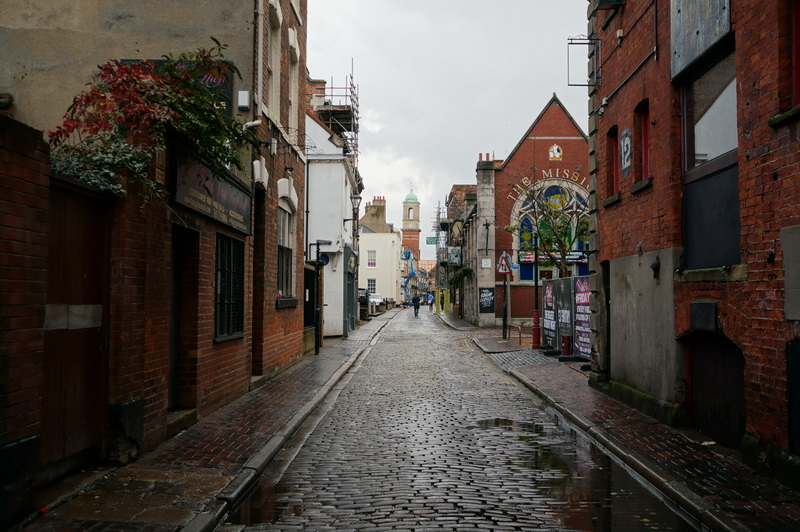
Posterngate in 2013 looking eastwards in the direction of Hull Minster.

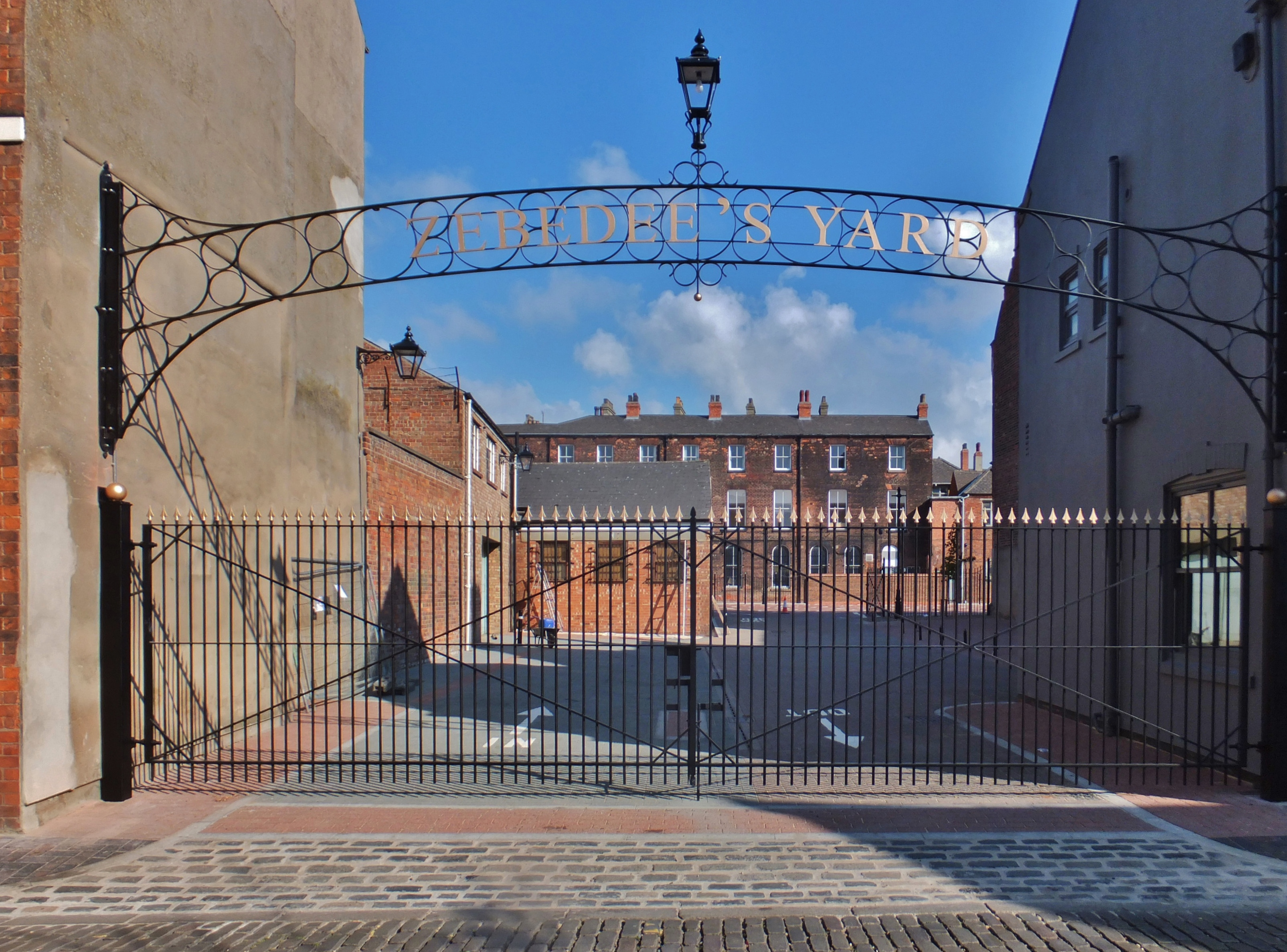
Entrance to Zebedee's Yard off Posterngate.

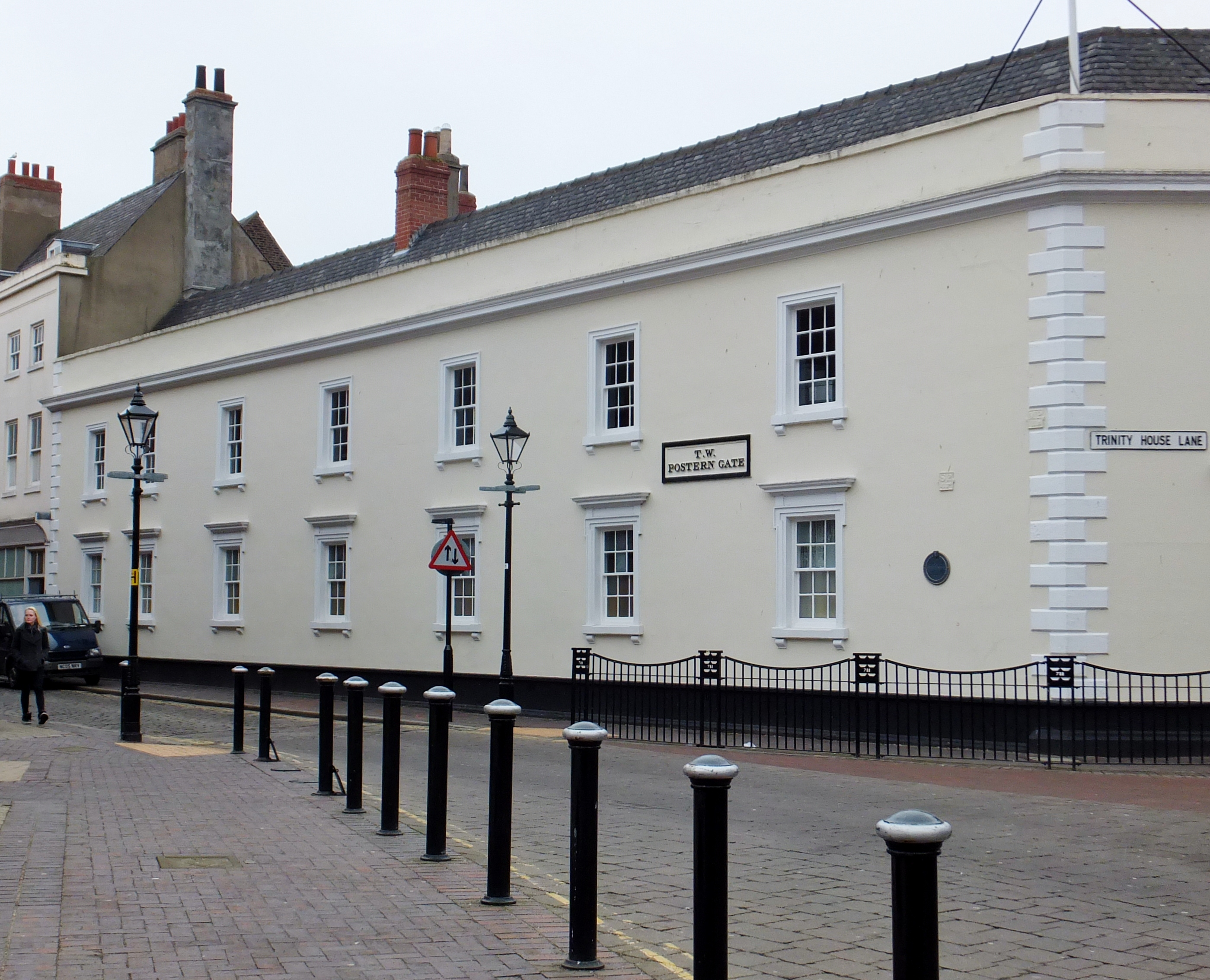
Trinity House at the street's eastern end.

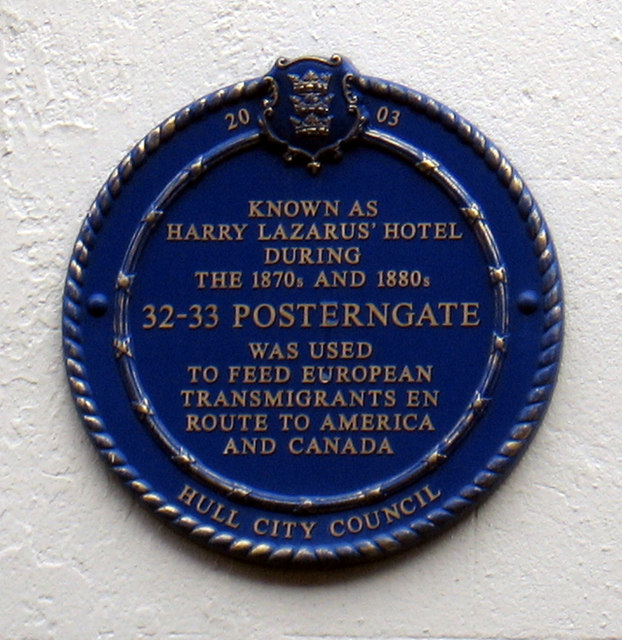
Blue plaque referencing the many European emigrants who stopped in Posterngate while on their way to North America.

Posterngate is a street in the city centre of Kingston upon Hull in East Riding of Yorkshire, England. It runs west to east from Princes Dock to Hull Minster, parallel to Whitefriargate to the north. Located in the old town of Hull, it features buildings from a variety of historical periods. At its eastern end is the 1750s Grade II listed Trinity House building. Close by are the Kingston pub and a statue of the seventeenth century poet Andrew Marvell, who attended nearby Hull Grammar School. In 1780 in response to the Gordon Riots in London the Roman Catholic chapel in the street was attacked by a mob. The street features several listed buildings.

== Bibliography ==
- Chrystal, Paul. Hull in 50 Buildings. Amberley Publishing Limited, 2017.
- Neave, David & Pevsner, Nikolaus. Yorkshire: York and the East Riding. Yale University Press, 1995.
- Turnham, Margaret H. Catholic Faith and Practice in England, 1779-1992: The Role of Revivalism and Renewal. Boydell & Brewer, 2015.
