= Richard Boston =

English journalist and author (1938–2006)

- Born: 29 December 1938; England
- Died: 22 December 2006 (aged 67); England
- Occupations: Journalist and author

Richard Boston (29 December 1938 – 22 December 2006) was an English journalist and author, a rigorous dissenter and a belligerent pacifist. An anarchist, toper, raconteur, marathon runner and practical joker, he described his pastimes as "soothsaying, shelling peas and embroidery" and argued that Adam and Eve were the first anarchists: "God gave them only one order and they promptly broke it".

== Early life ==
Boston was born in London and raised on a Kent farm. He was educated at Stowe School, Regent Street Polytechnic and King's College, Cambridge. During the early 1960s, he taught abroad in Sweden, Sicily and Paris. In 1966, towards the end of his period in France he worked as a film extra, acting as a longshot stand-in for Jacques Tati in his film Playtime.

== Journalism ==
For more than 30 years, Boston contributed to a range of newspapers, magazines and broadcast programmes. Initially, staff jobs included Peace News, New Society (since subsumed into the New Statesman) and The Times Literary Supplement (TLS), and he became known for an oddball but passionate take on the passing scene. From 1972, Boston was a freelance columnist, features and editorial writer on The Guardian.

Soon after starting, Boston, together with Michael McNay, came up the idea of a column about beer. Keg beers such as Watneys Red Barrel and Ind Coope Double Diamond were being pushed on the beer drinker with widespread distribution and high advertising budgets. These bland, sterile and gassy beers provided Aunt Sallies for his regular Saturday column in The Guardian, "Boston on Beer", which started shortly after the launch of the Campaign for Real Ale (CAMRA). Some regular readers might have been disappointed to hear that: "Despite all the talk of real ale, I have to say that, if ever I saw Richard in the village pub, he was usually drinking something stronger." However, in 1977, Boston co-founded Penrhos Brewery in Herefordshire alongside Terry Jones and Peter Austin.

In 1977, he founded the environmentalist magazine Vole.

== Quotes ==
=== By Richard Boston ===
- On his candidature in the 1994 European elections: "It's a big trough and I want to get my nose in it."'
- On beer:
  "Beer horrible stuff, mine's a pink gin."
  "Can't stand the stuff!"
- On Watership Down when re-examining some well known books: "The rabbits upheld the public school virtues of getting up early, having cold showers, and going on very long runs."
- On Adam and Eve: "[They] were the first anarchists, God gave them only one order and they promptly broke it".

=== By others ===
- John Falcke, the painter: "Above everything, I admired his moral courage in standing by his principles in everything he did."
- Alan Rusbridger, journalist: "Richard Boston was incapable of being serious about anything for very long. His love of literary practical jokes and puns concealed both an acute and erudite mind and a personality given to prolonged periods of melancholy."
- Anne Boston: "He was a free thinker, a true independent who tenaciously tracked his train of thought into unexpected territory, sometimes surprising himself as much as others."

== Bibliography ==
Works by Richard Boston:

- 1970. The Press We Deserve, edited by Richard Boston. London: Routledge & K. Paul. ISBN 0-7100-6821-2.
- 1974. An Anatomy of Laughter. London: Collins. ISBN 0-00-216004-8.
- 1975. Ed. and introduction to: The Admirable Urquhart: Selected Writings (Urquhart, Thomas, Sir, 1611–1660). London: Gordon Fraser Gallery. ISBN 0-900406-40-2.
- 1976. Beer and Skittles. London: Collins. ISBN 0-00-216066-8.
- 1977. Baldness Be My Friend. London: Elm Tree Books. ISBN 0-241-89732-7.
- 1977. Foreword to Little Boxes: A Selection of Bryan McAllister Cartoons from "The Guardian". London: Guardian Newspapers. ISBN 0-85265-024-8.
- 1979. The Little Green Book, edited by Richard Boston, Richard Holme and Richard North. London: Wildwood House. ISBN 0-7045-0381-6.
- 1982. The C. O. Jones Compendium of Practical Jokes, (Illustrated by Posy Simmonds). London: Enigma Books. ISBN 0-7278-3003-1.
- c. 1983. Foreword to The Belchers: A Strip Cartoon from Vole magazine 1977–81, by Bryan Reading. Poole: Blandford. ISBN 0-7137-1387-9.
- c. 1985. Ed. The Busman’s Prayer, (Illustrated by Blaise Thompson). Reading (The Old School, Aldworth): Foss & Hodge.
- 1986. Introduction to: With an Eye to the Future by Osbert Lancaster. London: Century. (Originally pub London: Murray (1953). ISBN 0-7126-9467-6.
- 1987. Contribution to: A Decade of Anarchy (1961–70), ed Colin Ward. London: Freedom Press. ISBN 0-900384-37-9.
- 1989. Osbert: A Portrait of Osbert Lancaster. London: Collins. ISBN 0-00-216324-1.
- 1994. Boudu Saved From Drowning (Boudu sauvé des eaux). London: BFI Publishing. ISBN 0-85170-467-0.
- 1995. Essay in The Raven, No 30: New Life to the Land?. London: Freedom Press.
- 1997. Starkness at Noon. Nottingham: Five Leaves Publications. ISBN 0-907123-32-5.
- 2003. Essay in A Country Diary Clifford Harper, by Clifford Harper. Agraphia Press. ISBN 1-904596-00-2.
