= Shipyard Brewing Company =

Brewery and soft-drink manufacturer in Portland, Maine

- Industry: Alcoholic beverage
- Founded: 1994 (32 years ago)
- Headquarters: Portland, Maine; United States
- Products: Beer
- Production output: ~93,000 bbls (2018)
- Website: www.shipyard.com

Shipyard Brewing Company is a brewery and soft-drink manufacturer in Portland, Maine, United States. Founded in 1994, by 2024 it was the second-largest brewery in Maine by beer sales volume, behind Allagash Brewing Company. It also owns Sea Dog Brewing Company and Capt'n Eli's soft drinks. Shipyard was once the fourth-largest microbrewery in New England after Boston Beer Company, Harpoon Brewery and Magic Hat Brewing Company.

Pumpkinhead is the brewery's popular annual fall release. First released in 1997, it accounts for around 40 percent of the brewery's production, despite being available for three months. Shipyard also brews an American version of Old Thumper under license from Ringwood Brewery.

== History ==
Shipyard Brewing Company was established in 1994, expanding on Kennebunkport Brewing Company (KBC). KBC was formed under the Ashleigh Inc. corporation, with founders Gordon Hurtubise and Fred Forsley, at Federal Jack’s Restaurant and Brew Pub in Kennebunk, Maine, one of Maine's original brew pubs and working breweries. Within two years, demand for KBC beer outpaced the small operation and, in April 1994, Forsley, Hurtubise and brewer Alan Pugsley expanded into Hurtubise's previous real-estate purchase and opened the Shipyard Brewing Company on Hancock Street in the heart of the waterfront in Portland, Maine, on the site of the former Crosby Laughlin Foundry and opposite the popular Village Cafe. In 1995, Miller Brewing Company purchased a 50 percent stake in Shipyard, allowing Shipyard to use Miller's laboratories and distribution network. Shipyard's production dropped by around 14,000 barrels per year between 1996 and 1998, leading to Miller selling its stake back to Shipyard.

In 1996, Shipyard began distributing Capt'n Eli's soft drinks, established by Eli Forsley, Fred's father. In 2000, during a slowdown in the popularity of microbreweries, Shipyard was selling 75 percent of its products in New England. In 2008, Shipyard brewed 81,641 barrels of ale annually. Five years later, it had increased to more than 166,000 barrels a year. As of 2017, Shipyard's products were available in 42 states, up from 34 states in 2011. A decade later, its production was around 93,000 barrels. In 2011, Shipyard was producing seventeen varieties of beer. It was the 19th-largest craft brewery in the country and 28th-largest overall.

As a comparison of Maine breweries, Shipyard produced 3.6 million gallons of beer in 2016, just under one million gallons more than second-placed Allagash, but Allagash's sales were trending upwards and Shipyard's were decreasing. Shipyard's production was down 29 percent from its peak in 2013. By 2024, beer sales volume at Allagash had surpassed Shipyard and led Maine's craft breweries.

In 2018, Shipyard announced plans to build a $36-million packing facility in Hooksett, New Hampshire, a facility it would share with as many as sixty other companies. The company began brewing there, in addition to its locations in Maine, Vermont, Florida and New York. As of 2025, its Portland facility has a tasting room and a five-barrel brewery. Shipyard previously brewed at the Shipyard Emporium in Winter Park, Florida. It opened a tasting room in nearby Sanford, Florida, in 2023.

In 2019, Shipyard established a beer exchange with Rocks Brewing Company in Sydney, Australia. The same year, the brewery announced a fifteen-year trade extension with Marston's, its partner in the United Kingdom. At the time, Shipyard was 42nd in the Brewers Association's (BA) rankings of the top 50 craft brewers by volume, a fall of thirteen places in twelve months. It continued a trend, the brewery having slipped from 28th to 37th between 2016 and 2017. In 2023, Shipyard became the top American craft beer brand sold by volume in the UK.

In 2020, Shipyard and Brew Theory, a brewery in Orlando, Florida, formed a licensing agreement. Shipyard also produced a special edition of its Chamberlain Pale Ale to mark the bicentennial of Maine's admittance to the union. The beer is named for American Civil War hero Joshua Chamberlain.

== See also ==
- List of breweries in Maine
- Beer in the United States
