= Allagash Brewing Company =

Brewery in Portland, Maine, United States of America

Coordinates: 43.7031°N 70.3178°W

- Main entrance at the Portland facility
- Type: Private
- Industry: Alcoholic beverage
- Founded: 1995 (31 years ago)
- Founder: Rob Tod
- Headquarters: Portland, Maine, United States
- Area served: United States
- Key people: Rob Tod
- Products: Beer
- Production output: 94,743 barrels/year (2017)
- Owner: Rob Tod
- Website: www.allagash.com

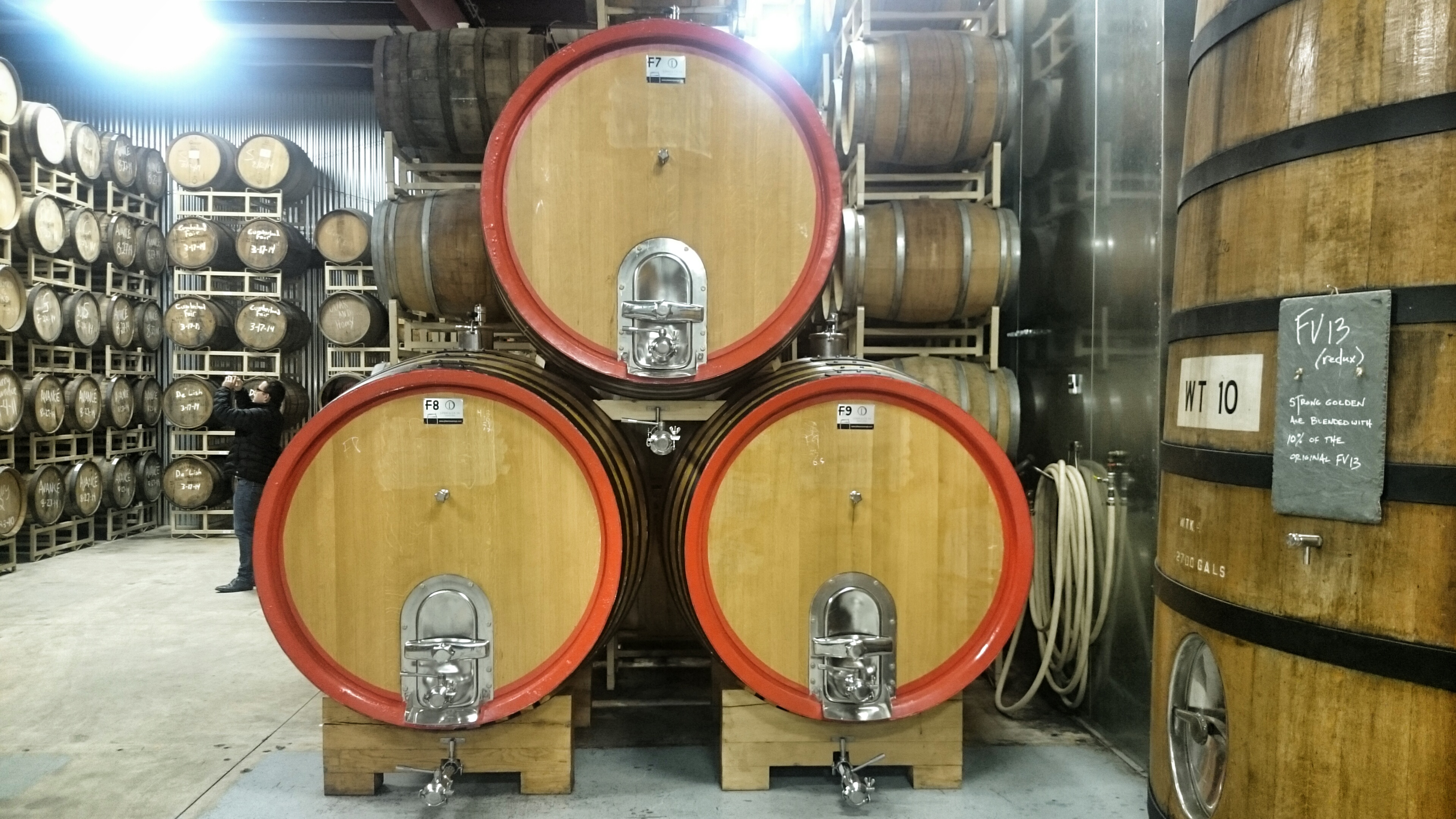
Allagash barrel-aging room

Allagash Brewing Company is a brewery in Portland, Maine. The brewery specializes in Belgian-style beers, and was the Maine craft brewery with the highest beer sales volume during 2024.

The brewery has tasting rooms at two Maine locations: 50 Industrial Way in the Riverton neighborhood of Portland, and The Allagash Bungalow, at 10 Market Street in Scarborough. In 2026, USA Today recognized Allagash as one of the 10 best U.S. breweries for beer lovers to visit.

== History ==
Allagash Brewing Company was founded by Rob Tod in Portland, Maine, in 1995. Tod observed that while both German and British style beers were available throughout the United States, Belgian-style beers were difficult to find. He established a small, 15-barrel brewery, and began brewing a beer modeled after a Belgian witbier, named Allagash White. The beer gets its flavor from the use of wheat in addition to barley, as well as the addition of Curaçao orange peel, coriander, and other spices.

In 2007, Allagash was the first brewery in the U.S. to build a traditional coolship for spontaneous fermentation by wild yeasts. The brewery achieved certified B Corporation status in 2019 and qualified again in 2022 with a 20-point increase. Also in 2019, Tod was the recipient of the James Beard Foundation Award for Outstanding Wine, Beer, or Spirits Professional.

As of February 2024, Allagash White is the most-awarded witbier in the world, with multiple wins from the Great American Beer Festival, the World Beer Cup, the Brussels Beer Challenge, and the European Beer Star awards, while Allagash Tripel has won the most gold medals combined in competition at the Great American Beer Festival and the World Beer Cup.

Allagash has won the Great American Beer Festival's award for "Brewery of the Year" in its category three times, in 2021, 2023, and 2025. In 2025, the brewery won gold medals for two of its beers: Tripel, awarded in the Belgian-style Tripel category, and Allagash Lager, awarded in the International-Style Pilsner category.

== Production ==
Storage tank at the Portland location

Many of the beers Allagash produces are bottle-conditioned. The technique calls for two fermentations, the first in the fermenting tanks and the second in the bottle itself (a process known as the methode champenoise). Before the beer is bottled, a small amount of yeast and sugar is added and a second fermentation occurs. It is this second fermentation which produces a notable increase in carbonation, a softer feel and remarkable complexity. This method of bottle conditioning leaves a small amount of yeast in the bottle. A coolship is used to cool the wort for some of the beers.

== Brands ==
Allagash has eight year-round beers in its portfolio, seven yearly releases, and numerous one-offs and keg-only releases.

=== Year-round beers ===
- White: Belgian-style witbier
- Tripel: Belgian-style Tripel
- Curieux: Belgian Tripel aged in bourbon barrels for seven weeks
- Hop Reach IPA: India Pale Ale
- North Sky: Belgian-style stout
- Gatherwell: Belgian-style bourbon barrel-aged stout
- Sixteen Counties: golden ale brewed with all Maine-grown grains including: Maine Malt House 2-row Malted Barley from Buck Farms, Blue Ox Malthouse 2-row Malted Barley, raw wheat from Maine Grains, and oats from Aurora Mills & Farm.
- House Beer: patersbier-style ale, only available at their tasting room in Portland, Maine.

== See also ==
- Beer in the United States
- List of breweries in Maine
