= Society of Independent Brewers =

Organization in the United Kingdom

The Society of Independent Brewers and Associates (formerly the Small Independent Brewers Association, or SIBA) is an organisation representing the interests of independent breweries in the UK. Founded in 1980, it was intended to fight the pub-tie system, under which large brewers owned 80% of the UK's pubs. It changed its name in 1995 to reflect the changing aspirations of its members, but retained its original acronym.

== History ==
Ringwood Brewery founder Peter Austin was the prime mover in establishing SIBA, and was the group's first chairman. Under his leadership, SIBA campaigned for 21 years for a progressive beer duty system, where smaller breweries would pay less tax on their products, to be introduced in the UK. Such a system was eventually adopted in 2002 by then-Chancellor Gordon Brown.

== Current status ==
In 2010, The Guardian reported that SIBA members had seen sales rise by 4% in 2009, and smaller members, who brew fewer than 350 barrels per week who constitute the vast majority of SIBA's membership, saw volume sales rise by 8.5%. SIBA is chaired by Richard Naisby, of Milton Brewery.

== Activities ==
SIBA aims to ensure that its members' products are of high quality, and membership is conditional upon adhering to the Code of Practice and By-Laws.

SIBA has previously attended the Great British Beer Festival (GBBF) with a bar showcasing the winners of that year's SIBA National Beer Competition.

In December 2003, SIBA launched the Direct Delivery Scheme (DDS) to help small brewers promote, sell and distribute their beers to local pubs, pubcos and retailers. The Internet-based system facilitates trade between "micro-suppliers and macro-consumers."

== See also ==
- Beer in the United Kingdom
- List of microbreweries
