= Geary Brewing Company =

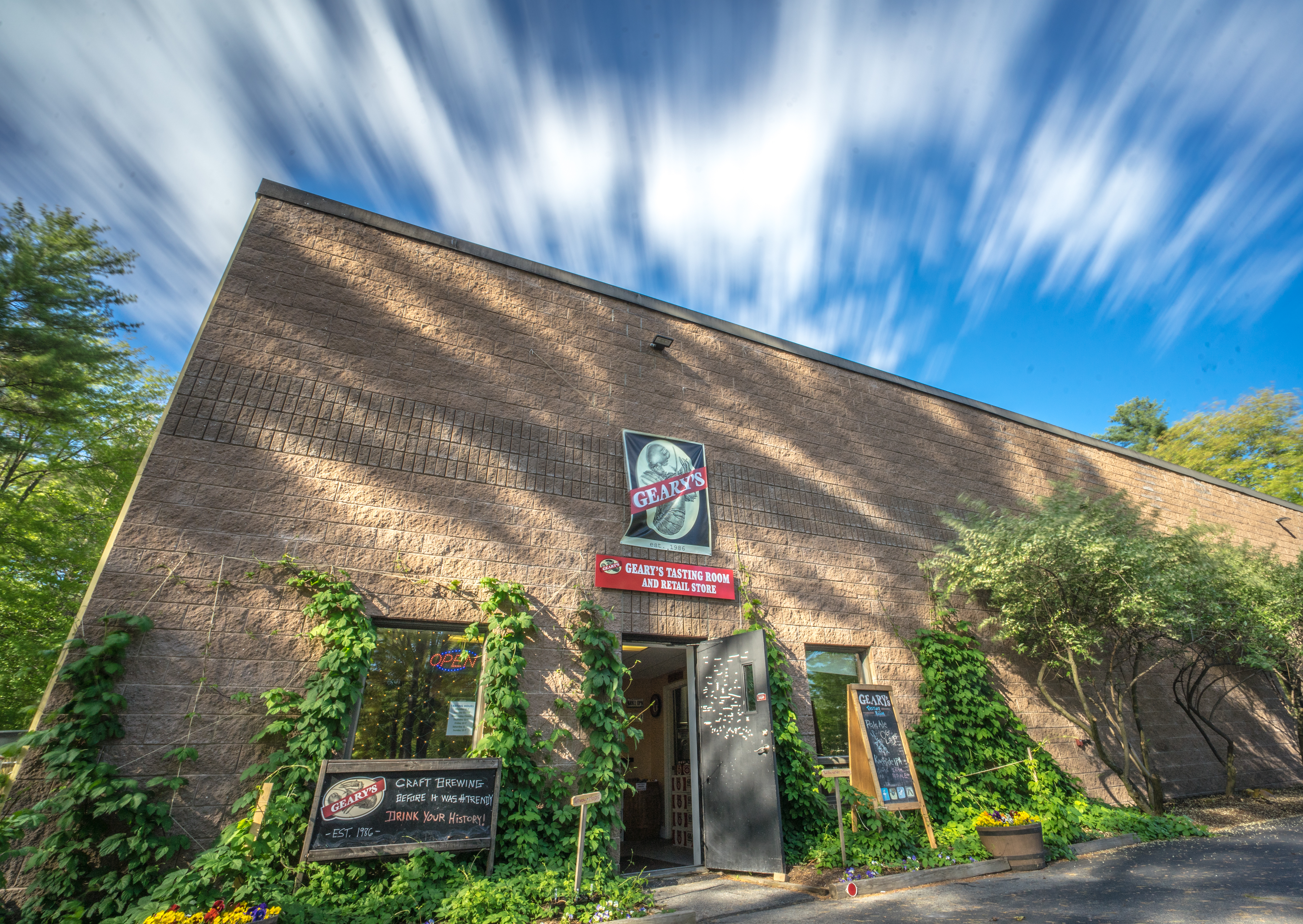
Since 1986, brewing has taken place at the original brewhouse in Portland, Maine.

Geary Brewing Company (commonly known as Geary's) is a craft brewery in Portland, Maine, United States. It was incorporated in October 1983 by David and Karen Geary. As of March 2017, Geary Brewing Company is owned and operated by Robin and Alan Lapoint of Freeport, Maine.

At the time of its inception in 1983, there were only 13 so-called microbreweries in the United States, almost all of them in California and the Pacific Northwest. Geary's, as it is more commonly known, was one of the first new microbreweries during America's late 20th-century brewing renaissance.

In the winter of 1984, David traveled to England and Scotland for training and research in brewing. With the help of Peter Maxwell Stuart, a Scottish nobleman and brewer who arranged introductions and itineraries, he worked in half-dozen small commercial breweries from the highlands of Scotland to the south coast of England. There were fewer resources for craft brewing at the time, so upon returning to the States, David and Karen began the long and difficult process of creating a business plan finding appropriate real estate, specifying equipment and raw materials, and raising the capital necessary to begin brewing. Once enough money was collected and two years had passed, the size and design of the brewery began to take shape.

Alan Pugsley (who would go on to be a co-founder of Shipyard Brewing Company) was recruited to set up the brewery. Brewing began in the fall of 1986, and once David sampled and approved of the Geary's Pale Ale, the brewery was ready. On December 10, 1986, the first pints of Geary's Pale Ale were sold. Their beer offerings eventually expanded to 10 beers, with some being limited time seasonals. In 1987 D. L. Geary Brewing Company's first big distribution break occurred when supermarket chains, Hannaford and Shaw's started carrying their beers. In 1990, they began distributing outside of the Northeastern United States.

In 2006 Geary's London Porter won a New York Times blind taste test when put against 24 other Porters. During the late 2000s, the beer market and the number of breweries grew exponentially in Maine. According to numbers from Maine's Bureau of Alcoholic Beverages and Lottery Operations, Geary's beer production dropped by 34.5 percent from 2011 to 2015, while craft beer production as an industry had increased from 2011 to 2015. Increased competition along with decreased production, the devastating loss of one of the founders, Karen Geary, and a general loss of passion eventually led to the sale of the brewery new owners in March 2017.

David Geary died in 2023, aged 78.
