= List of Georgia distilleries =

This is a list of notable distilleries in Georgia, United States.

There are two distilleries in the city limits of Georgia's state capital, Atlanta, another two in the greater metropolitan area of Atlanta, and two in Georgia's third-largest city, Savannah.

== Table ==
Company	City		
Distillery of Modern Art	Chamblee	Dalton Distillery	Dalton
Lovell Bros. Distillery	Mount Airy		
R.M. Rose	Mt. Airy		
Big Creek Distilling	Dahlonega		
Legends	Cumming		
Remedy	Flowery Branch		
Granddaddy Mimms	Blairsville		
Moonrise	Clayton		
Swallow Creek	Hiawasee		
Blue Ridge Distillery	Blue Ridge		
White Path Distllery	Ellijay		
House of Applejay Distillery	Ellijay		
Sharpton Distilling Company	Jasper		
Lazy Guy Distillery	Kennesaw		
Third Rail Distillery (Closed)	Lawrenceville		
Oak House Distillery	Athens		
Granite Mountain Distillery	Stone Mountain		
Old Fourth Distillery	Norcross		
Short Barrel Distillery	Norcross		
ASW Distillery	Atlanta		
Wild Leap	Atlanta		
Lost Druid	Avondale		
Rivers Distillery	Jackson		
Longleaf Distilling	Macon		
Second City Distilling	Augusta		
Richland Rum	Brunswick		
LaHood Distillery	Americus		
13th Colony Distillery	Americus		
1861 Distillery	Thomasville		
Zac Brown Distillery (closed)	Dahlonega		
Hope Springs Distillery (closed)	Lilburn		

== See also ==
- Blue laws in the United States
