= Neuhoff District =

Area in Nashville, Tennessee, US

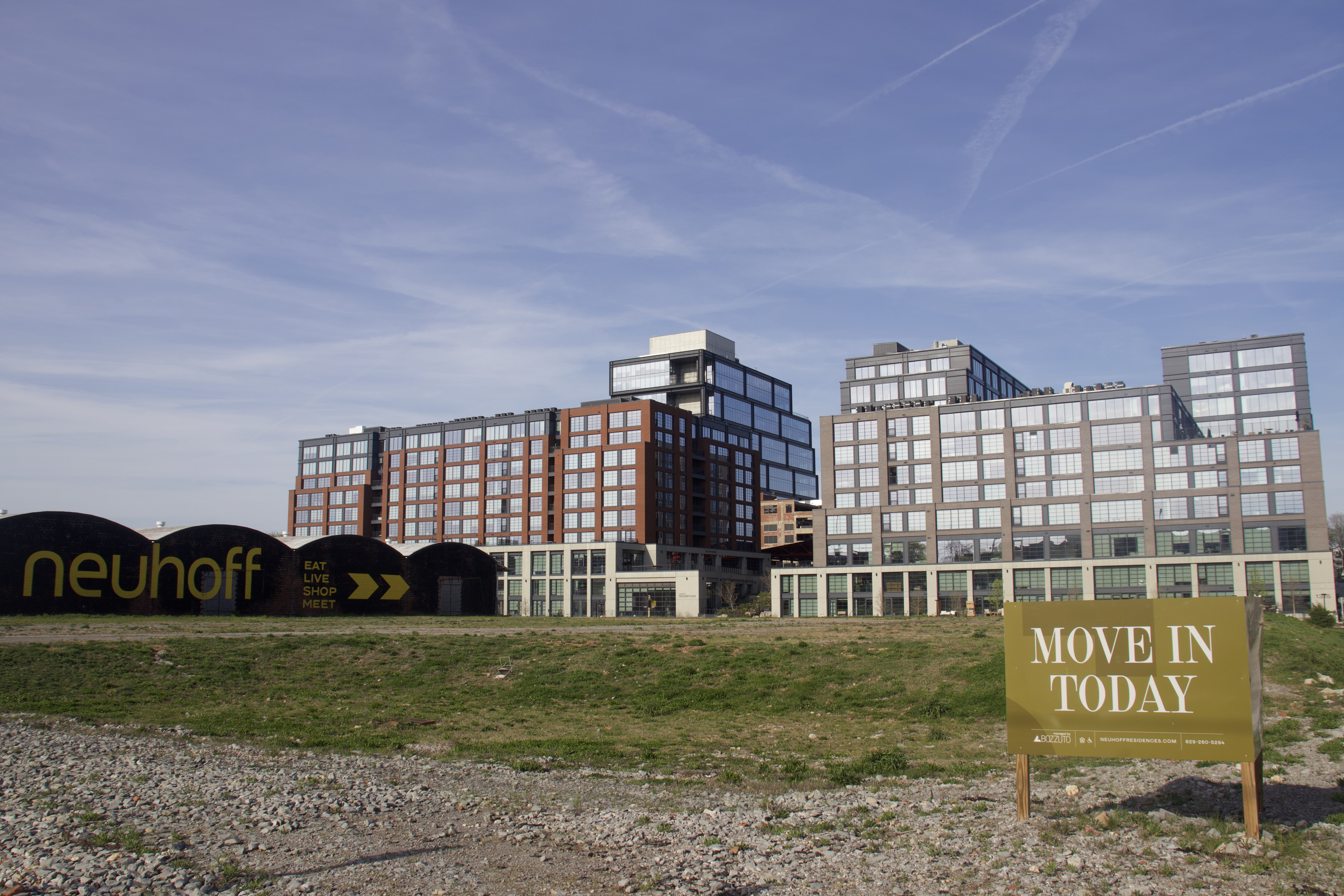

General information
- Type: Mixed-use development, adaptive reuse
- Architectural style: Industrial architecture, contemporary architecture
- Location: 1316 Adams Street, Nashville, TN 37208
- Renovated: 2023
- Owner: New City Properties

Design and construction
- Architecture firm: S9 Architects, Smith Gee Studio and HKS Architects.

Website
- https://www.neuhoffdistrict.com/

The Neuhoff District is a mixed-use, adaptive reuse development in a former slaughterhouse in Nashville, Tennessee. It is located in the easternmost part of the Germantown neighborhood adjacent to the Cumberland River and Downtown Nashville. The 914,000 square foot (84,913 m^{2}) development is complete with ground-floor retail spaces and restaurants, gardens and courtyards, pickleball courts, two apartment complexes, and an office complex. Formerly a slaughterhouse owned by the German immigrant Neuhoff family, it became abandoned since 1977. The site was acquired by New City Properties in 2019 and completed renovations in 2023. Significant investors include Cousins Properties Inc. and JP Morgan and designers include Future Green Studio, S9 Architecture, HKSArchitects, and Nashville-based Smith Gee Studio.

Interactive map of Neuhoff District and the Germantown area.

== Occupants ==
The district complex contains an office building, two apartment buildings (Monroe House and Taylor House), retail stores, restaurants, an Atlanta-based taproom and brewery, and pickleball courts.

Retail stores and restaurants leasing the space are made up of small local businesses and larger regional and national companies. Larger companies include Van Leeuwen Ice Cream, Sensa Padel, Ann Mashburn, Sid Mashburn, E+Rose, and Monday Night Brewing.

Neuhoff also has high-profile office tenants, such as Rubicon Founders, J.E. Dunn, Dalton, Fifth Third Bank, and Boston Consulting Group.

== Construction ==
The project is still in progress and entails subsequent phases. With the first phase completed in 2024, phase two will include an office tower connected by a sky bridge, a boutique hotel, and a pedestrian bridge connected to Oracle Corps. $1.35 billion tech campus across the Cumberland River. The site is organized into four blocks:

- Block 1, 14-story glass office tower overlooking downtown Nashville.
- Block 2, the former slaughterhouse now accommodating retail and recreational spaces
- Blocks 3, 4, pair of mid-rise apartments with 542 units and parking garages.

The final phase will construct low-rise retail, office, and residential buildings in blocks 3 and 4.

== History ==
The developer is New City Properties, who has worked on other post-industrial adaptive reuse locales including Atlanta's Fourth Ward and Ponce City Market. New City Properties bought the property for $32 million in 2020 and spent around $550 million through the first phase of development. Prior to New City Properties' acquisition, the Neuhoff Packing Company operated from 1905 to 1977. Baltz Brothers Packing Company acquired the property in 1984 before going out of business and selling the property to the McRedmond family in 1998. The McRedmond's invested $1 million to clean up the site, as it became a local dumping site after years of neglect.

Neuhoff District officially opened in 2024.
