= Barrel-aged beer =

Beer that has been aged in a wooden barrel

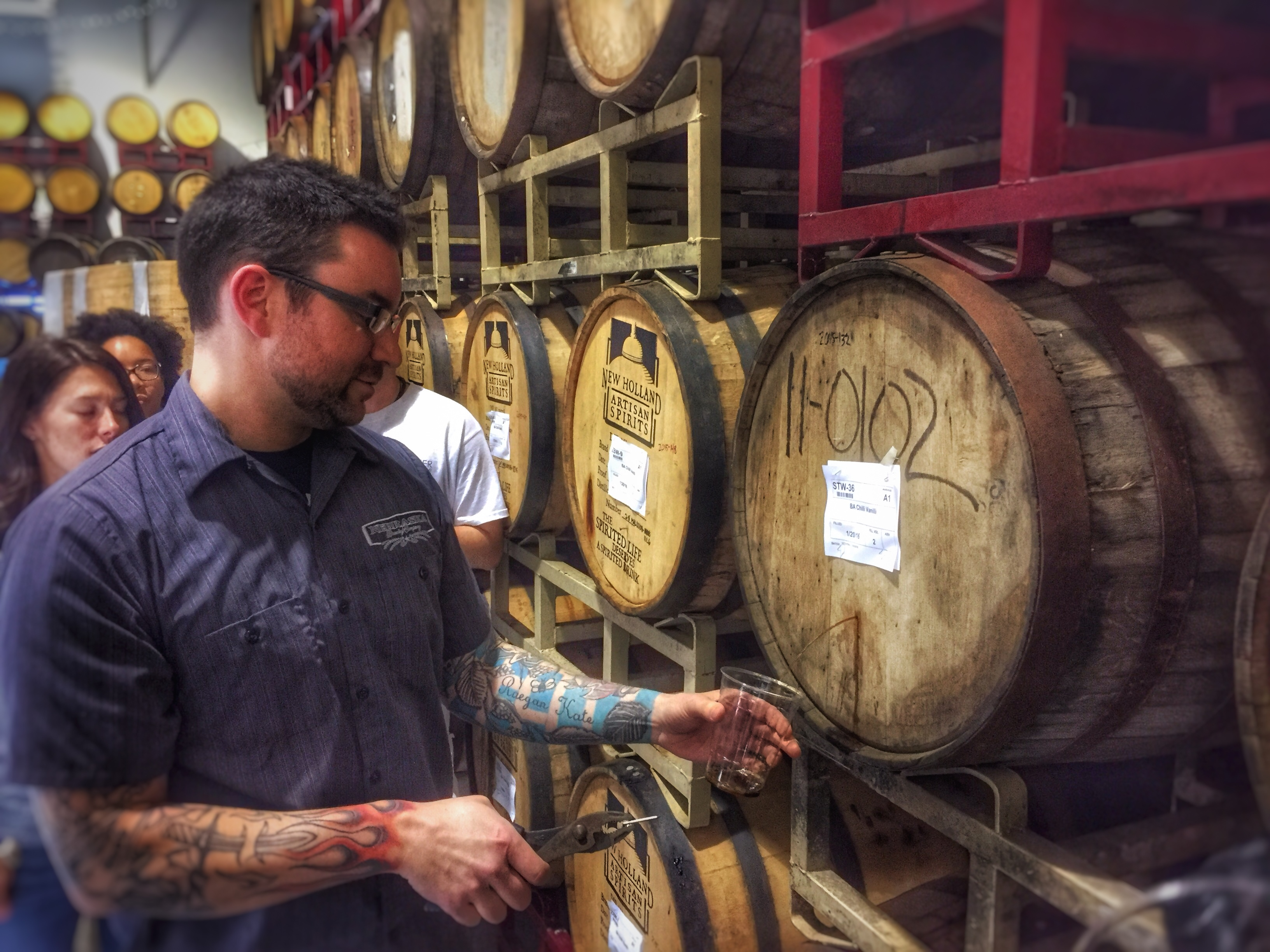
Tapping a barrel for a taste at Nebraska Brewing Company

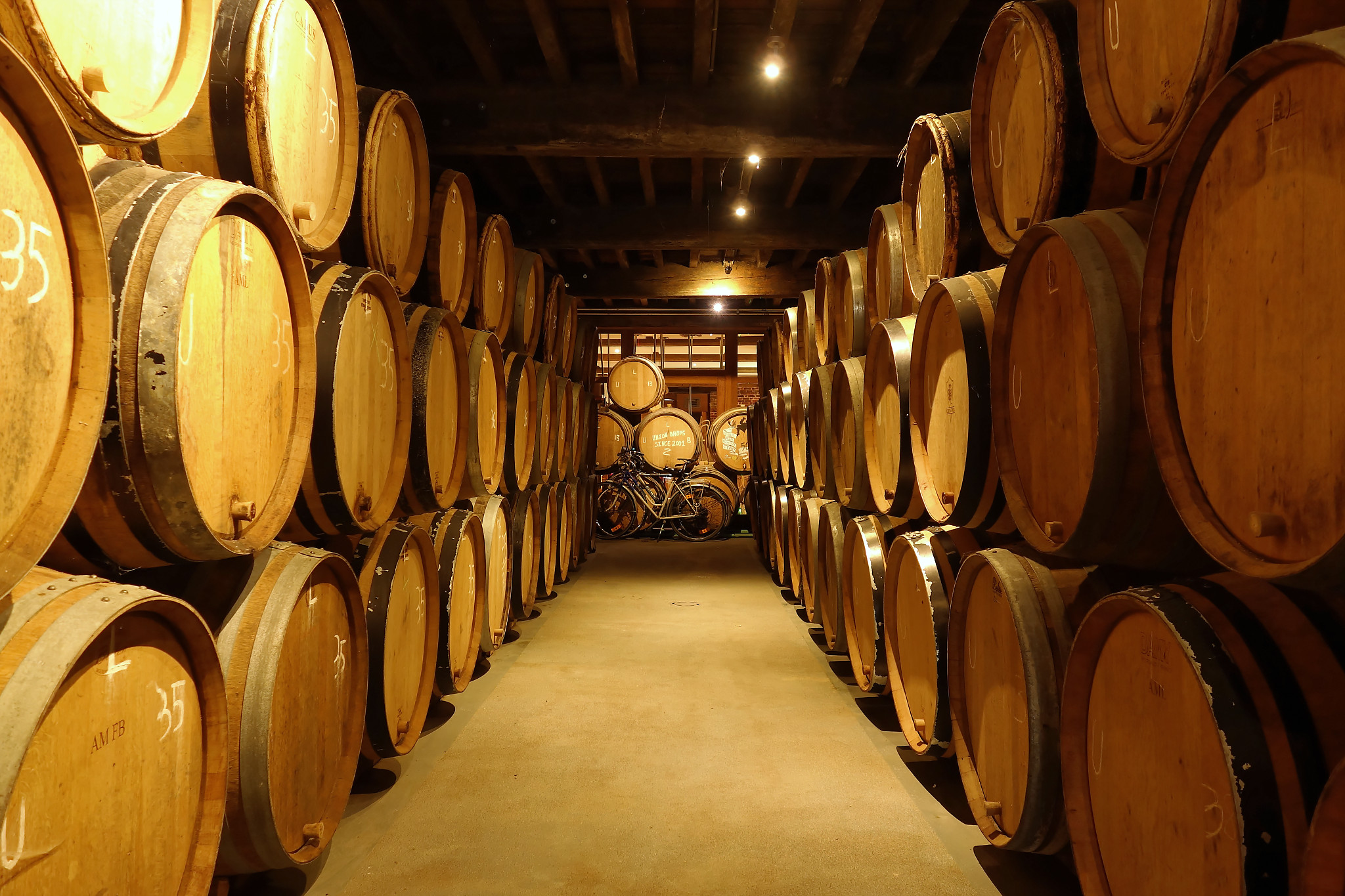
Barrel ageing of lambic beer at Cantillon Brewery in Anderlecht, Belgium

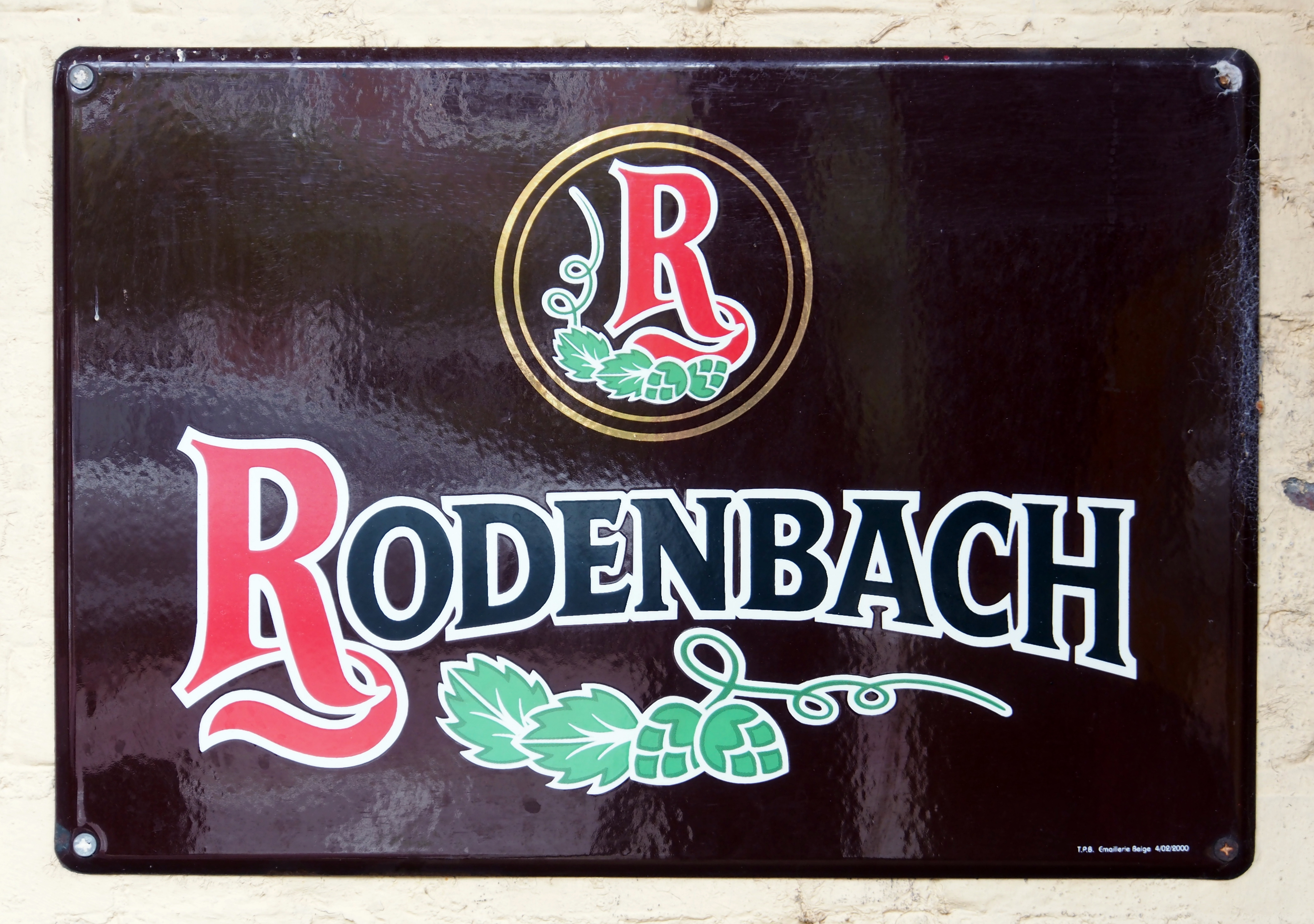
Rodenbach, brewers of Flanders red ale in Roeselare, West Flanders

A barrel-aged beer is a beer that has been aged for a period of time in a wooden barrel. Typically, these barrels once housed bourbon, whisky, wine, or, to a lesser extent, brandy, sherry, or port. There is a particular tradition of barrel ageing beer in Belgium, notably of lambic beers. The first bourbon barrel-aged beers were produced in the United States in the early 1990s.

Beers can be aged in barrels to achieve a variety of effects, such as imparting flavours from the wood (from tannins and lactones) or from the previous contents of the barrels, or causing a Brettanomyces fermentation. Oak remains the wood of choice, but other woods are in use as well. Chestnut, ash, poplar, cedar, acacia, cypress, redwood, pine, and even eucalyptus have been used for barrel-ageing with varying success.

The flavours imparted by oak barrels differ widely depending on the oak species, the growing area, and how the wood has been treated. New oak barrels can be used for ageing beer, but they are not common due to high costs. Some flavours that new oak will contribute are wood, vanilla, dill, spice, and toastiness.

== History ==
Lambics have been brewed in Belgium's Zenne Valley and Pajottenland since the 13th century. There were at least 300 lambic makers in the region in 1900, both in Brussels and in the countryside. Timmermans is one of the oldest existing breweries, dating back to 1702, and the production of the blended lambic derivative gueuze is believed to have started in the same year.

Eugene Rodenbach started brewing Flanders red ale in the 19th century, after learning how to "ripen" beer in oak barrels in England. Rodenbach Classic contains a blend of young beer with beer matured on oak for two years, whereas Rodenbach Vintage consists entirely of beer that has matured for two years in one selected foeder. Another Belgian sour beer style, Oud bruin is not typically barrel-aged, although there are some examples from both Belgium and North America.

In the German town of Bamberg, smoked beer or Rauchbier has been tapped directly from oakwood casks at the Schlenkerla tavern since the 15th century.

Greene King's Strong Suffolk Ale is an example of an 18th-century "country beer". It is blended from Old 5X, which is aged for two years in oak tuns. Large oak vats were once the norm for fermentation and storage of beer in England, a fact made notorious when one of these burst in London in 1814, killing eight people.

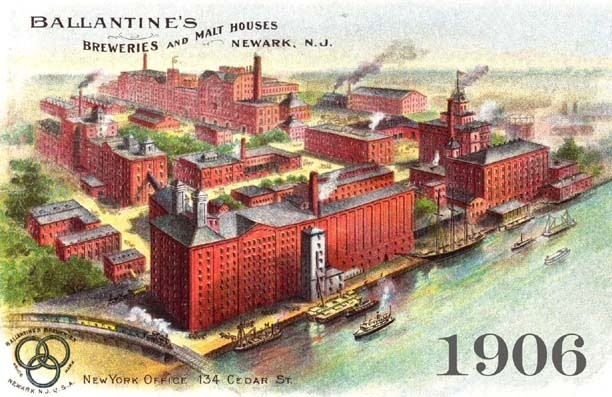
P. Ballantine & Sons brewery in Newark, New Jersey, in 1906

In the United States, the historic Ballantine Brewery aged their beer in wooden vats for up to a year. They were originally made of oak, and later of cypress wood. 20th century beer writer Michael Jackson characterised Ballantine IPA as "wonderfully distinctive, an outstanding American ale unique in its fidelity to the East Coast tradition of Colonial ales."

In the era of craft beer, some breweries produce exclusively barrel-aged beers, notably Belgian lambic producer Cantillon, and sour beer company The Rare Barrel. Others also specialise in barrel-ageing particular beer styles, such as Põhjala which has a focus on Baltic porters and Jester King with its Méthode Traditionnelle. International craft brewer, Mikkeller operates a custom barrel-ageing facility at an old shipyard in Copenhagen, Denmark.

In 2016, Craft Beer and Brewing wrote that "barrel-aged beers are so trendy that nearly every taphouse and beer store has a section of them. Food and Wine wrote in 2018: "A process that was once niche has become not just mainstream, but ubiquitous." In 2023 the Boston Globe reported that demand for barrel-aged beers had dropped, and they were becoming much harder to come by.

== Lambic beers of Belgium ==
Lambics are fermented and aged in wooden barrels similar to those used to ferment wine. The microflora from the wood contribute to a spontaneous fermentation and brewing activity was concentrated on the colder months of the year to avoid spoilage. The barrels used by traditional Belgian lambic breweries can be up to 150 years old, and the lambic ageing process typically lasts from one to three years. Willem Van Herreweghen of Timmermans said: "We have oak and chestnut barrels. Chestnut is neutral and imparts no taste to the lambic. Oak gives a vanilla-like flavour usually described as 'oaky' and, of course, this is the most common type of wood used by lambic makers."

New barrels are rarely used by lambic brewers - instead used barrels are procured from the wine regions of Spain, Portugal, Greece, and especially France. The wooden barrels come in three different sizes: Brussels tuns (approx. 250 litres), pipes (approx. 600 litres) and foeders (foudres in French) with a capacity of up to 10,000 litres and even larger. Most pipes are used port wine barrels that came into wide use in lambic production after World War I when port became a popular drink in Belgium. Every brewery has also bought barrels from colleagues who have stopped production, as evidenced by their markings.

Some American craft breweries have started producing their own versions of the traditional Belgian barrel-aged gueuze. In 2016 Jester King Brewery released a blended, spontaneously fermented beer which it labelled as "Méthode Gueuze." However, the High Council for Artisanal Lambic Beers (HORAL) objected to the name, and the two parties arranged a meeting in Belgium. It was agreed that in future the American brewers would use the designation "Méthode Traditionelle".

== Gallery of traditional barrel-aged beer styles ==
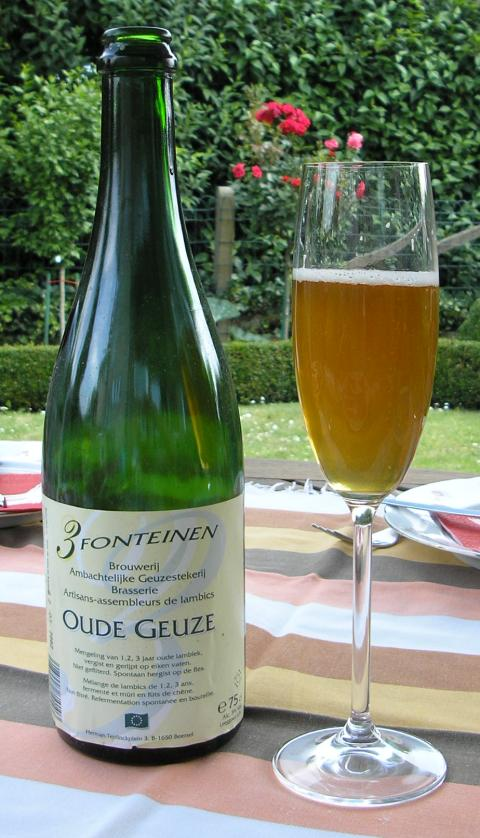
3 Fonteinen
Oude Gueuze

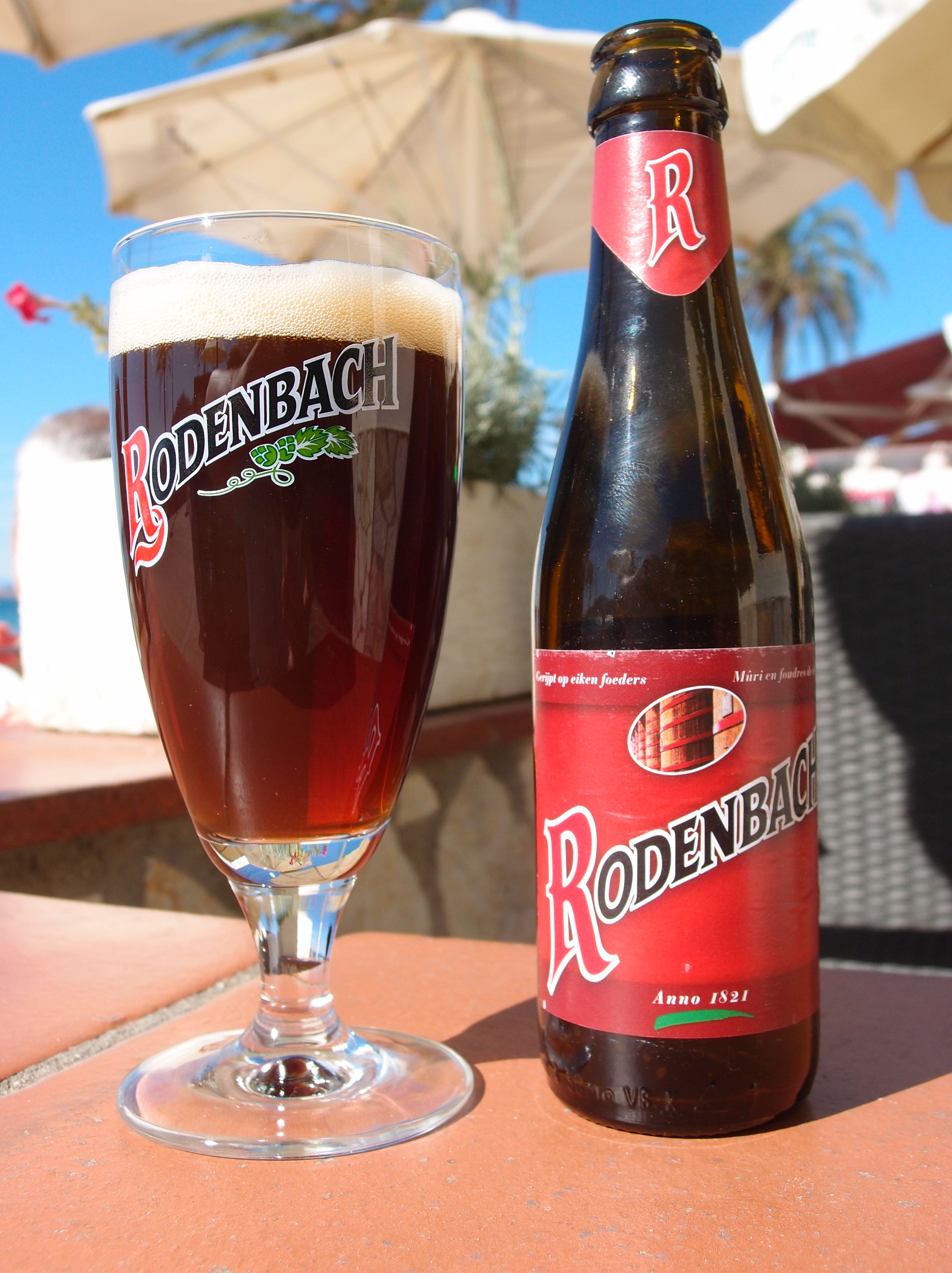
Rodenbach
Flanders red ale

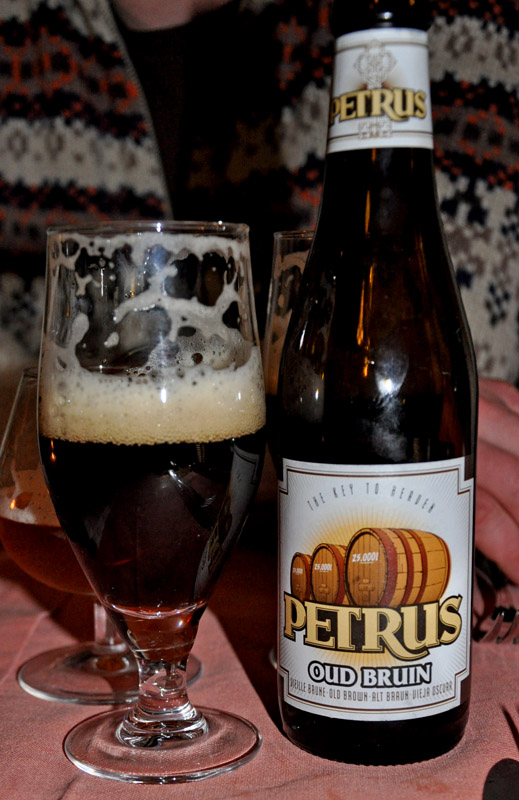
Petrus
Oud bruin

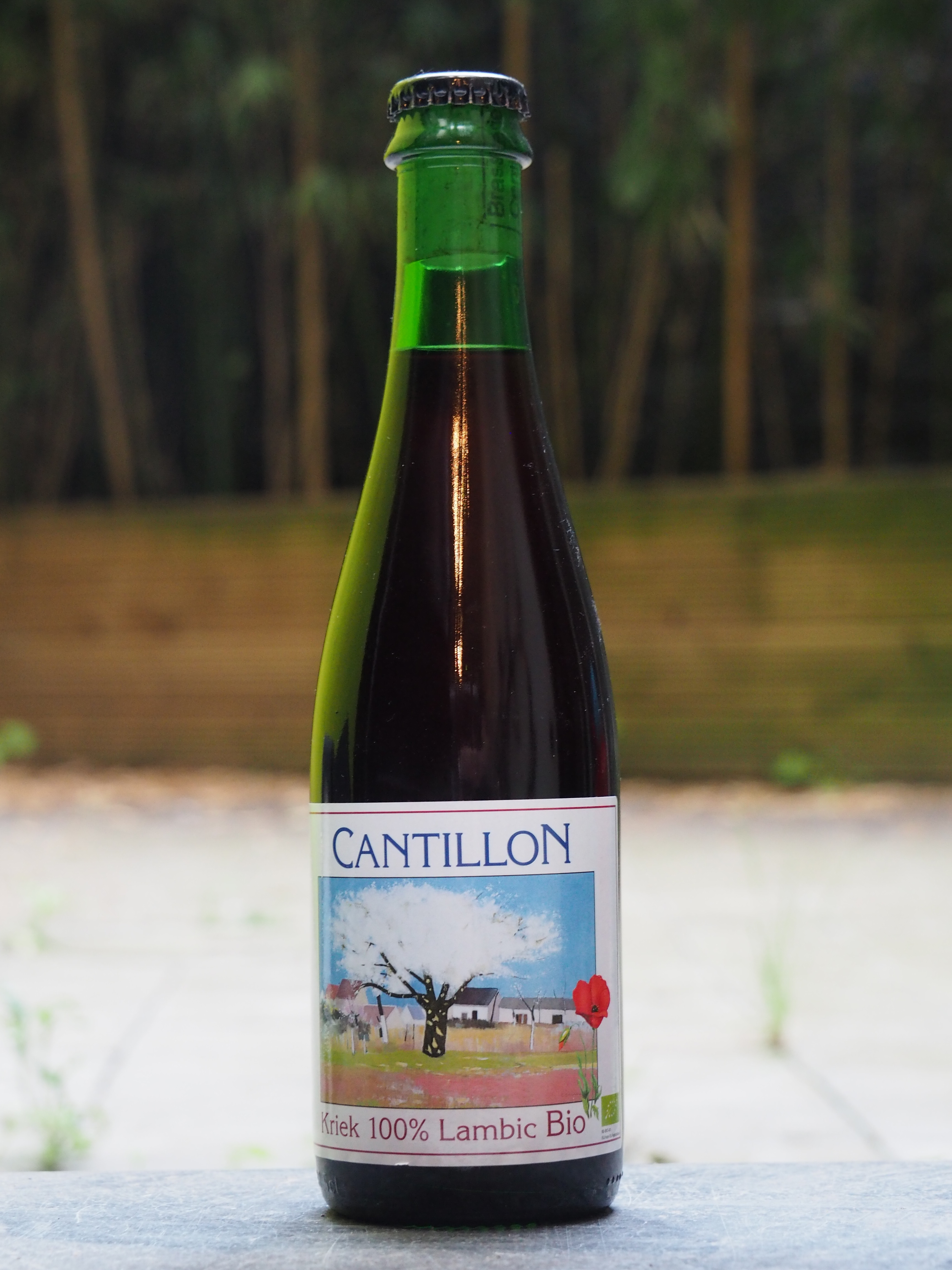
Cantillon
Kriek lambic

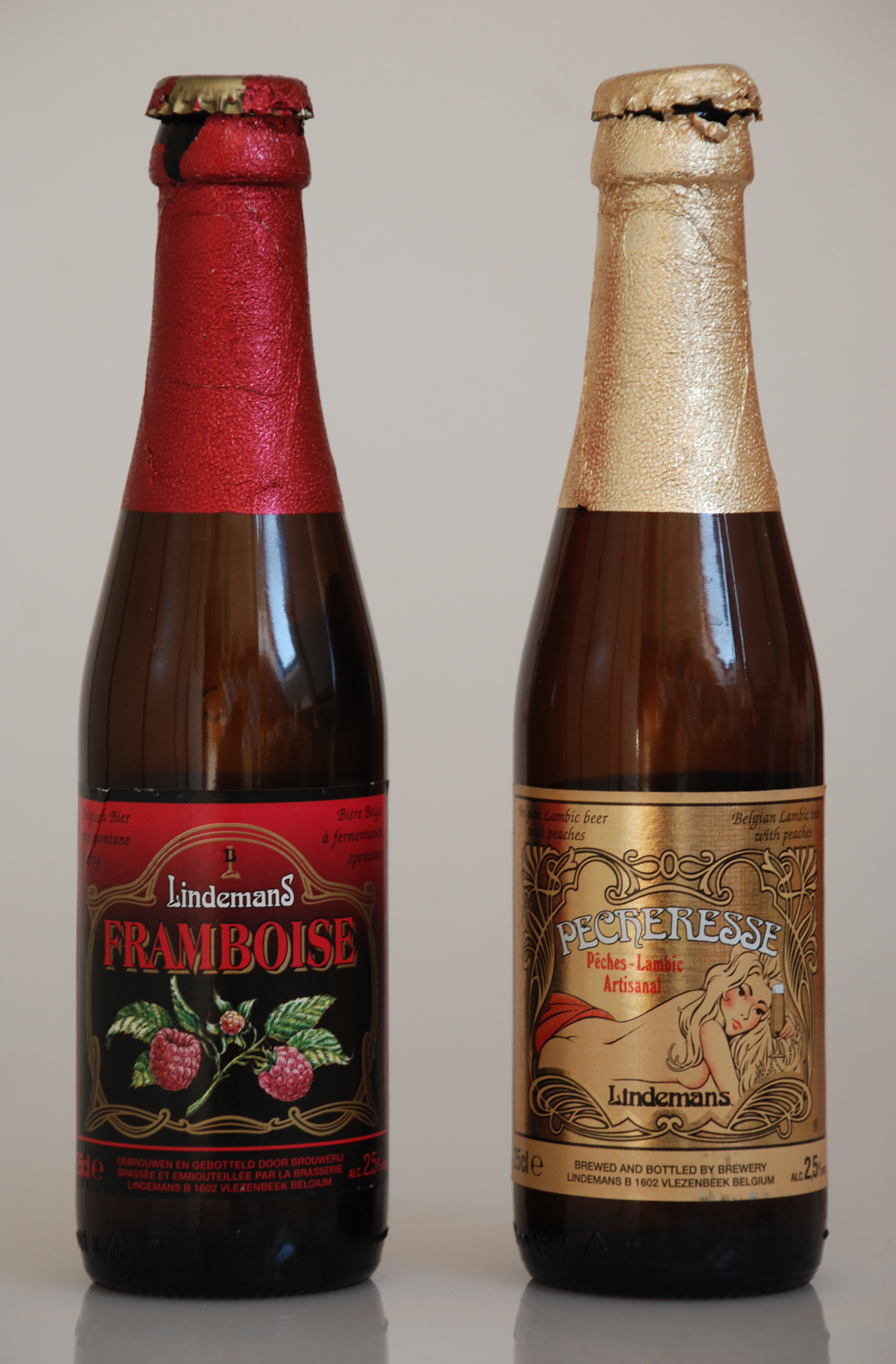
Lindemans Framboise
& Pêcheresse

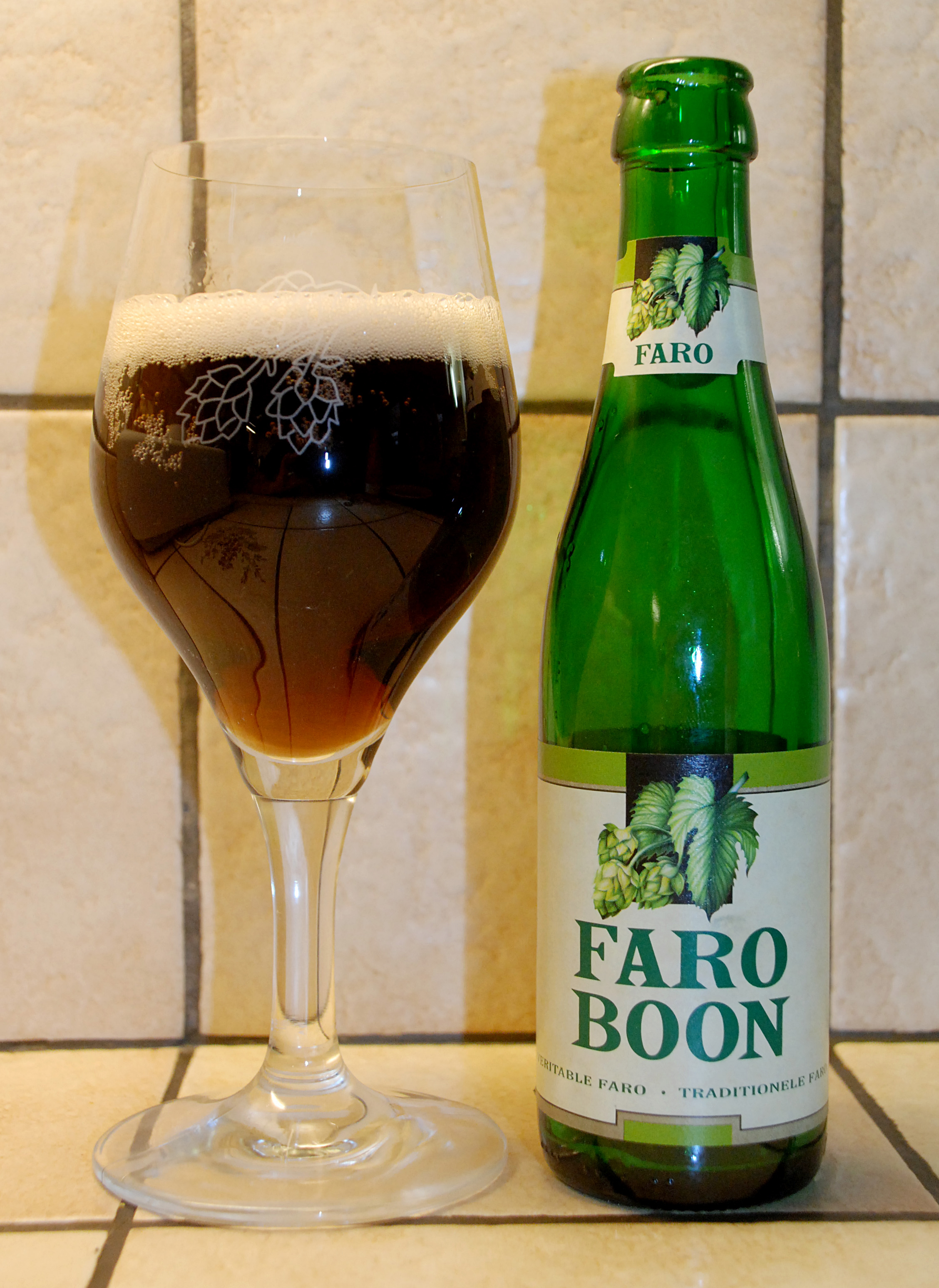
Brouwerij Boon
Faro

== Bourbon barrel ageing ==
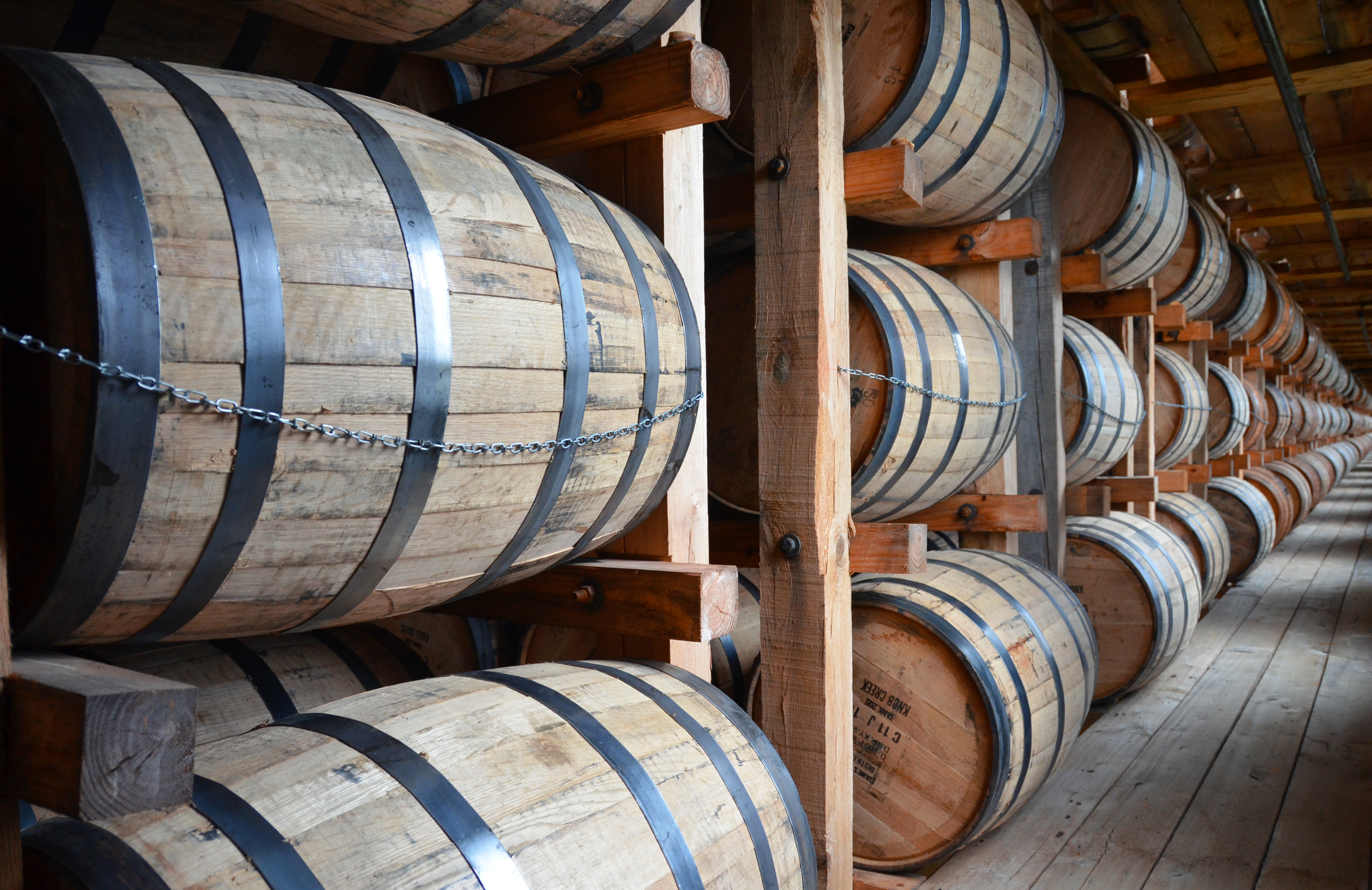
Jim Beam bourbon barrels in Clermont, Kentucky

Many beers are aged in barrels which were previously used for maturing spirits. Imperial stouts are often aged in bourbon barrels, which impart flavours of American oak (coconut, dill, sweet spices), accentuated by charring of the barrel interior. Bourbon barrels are by far the most common oak barrels used by brewers in the United States. Each distillery uses its own blend of oak and its own level of charring, leading to distinct differences in the sorts of flavours that brewers can derive from the used barrels.

By US law, "straight bourbon" must be aged in new American white oak barrels. This means that a barrel can only be used once to age true bourbon whiskey, a fact that turns a used barrel into a surplus item for a bourbon distillery.

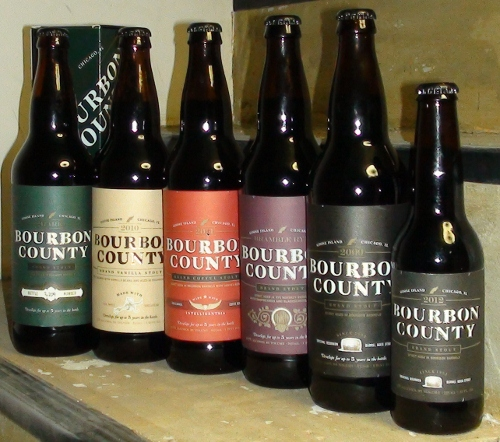
Goose Island's Bourbon County series

Goose Island's Bourbon County Stout was one of the first bourbon barrel-aged beers. It was first produced by Greg Hall in Chicago in 1992, when Jim Beam gave the brewer a couple of used barrels. Goose Island's Brett Porter said: "We let the warehouse run to Chicago temperatures—cold winters, followed by hot humid summers—that causes the staves in our bourbon barrels to bring in and then force out liquid, and that's where the flavour comes from." Chicago also hosts an annual Festival of Wood- and Barrel-Aged Beer (FoBAB), the world's largest beer festival and competition of its kind.

Other breweries began following Goose Island's lead, typically ageing rich Imperial stouts. Some early successes were Founders KBS (Kentucky Breakfast Stout), The Bruery's Black Tuesday and The Lost Abbey's Angel's Share (barley wine). America's enthusiasm for Bourbon barrel-ageing inspired Harviestoun in Scotland to join forces with the Highland Park Scotch whisky distillery. The result was the Ola Dubh range of barrel-aged black ales, aged in whisky casks of varying ages up to 40 years. Chris Pilkington of Põhjala said "We've learned the best barrels give noticeably better results."

Since bourbon barrels are only used once, they are often sold on to producers of other spirits who eventually sell them on again to breweries for barrel-ageing beer. The Bruery, which specializes in experimental barrel-aged and sour beers, has used bourbon, rye, brandy, rum, tequila, Scotch whisky and many other spirit barrels to age beer for anywhere from six to eighteen months.

== Wine barrel ageing ==
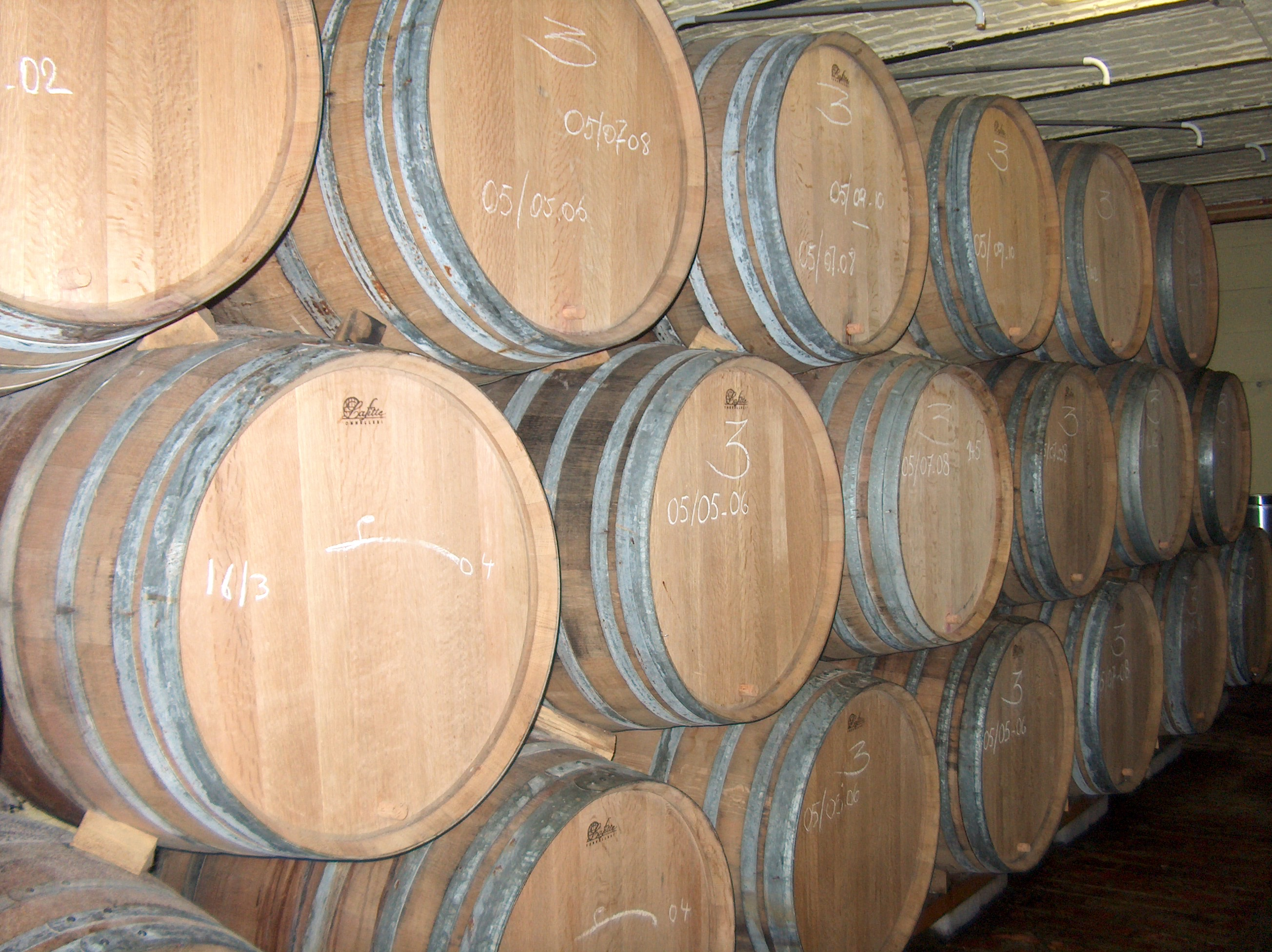
Wine barrel ageing of lambic beer at Hanssens Artisanaal in Dworp, Belgium. The barrels are from Lafitte in Bordeaux.

Unlike bourbon barrels, whose alcohol content kills off bacteria like Lactobacillus and Pediococcus and the wild yeast Brettanomyces, emptied wine barrels are often a breeding ground for them. While these microflora are considered a problem for most brewers and winemakers, they are essential in the creation of the many sour beer styles inspired by Belgium's sour ale tradition. Consequently, most wine barrel-aged beers end up becoming saisons, wild ales and other acidic beer styles.

The first American breweries to commit to wine barrel-aging were in California, led by Sonoma County's Russian River Brewing Company. In 1997, brewmaster Vinnie Cilurzo began making a series of heavily wine-influenced beers, like Temptation (chardonnay barrels), Supplication (pinot noir) and Consecration (cabernet sauvignon).

In another wine region in Virginia, Brian Nelson, the head brewer at Hardywood Park Craft Brewery said: "Our goal with our wine barrel-aged beer is to promote the actual wine character to add to the already complex flavours and aromas in the beer. We look for fresh wine barrels that complement the style of beer that we want to age."

Allagash's Brewing's Coolship range of beers are spontaneously fermented and aged in French oak wine barrels, for one to three years. "Coolship Cerise" is pale red in colour, after being aged on cherries for six months.

Wine barrels are usually made from French, American or sometimes Hungarian oak. French oak is denser, more mildly flavoured, and far more expensive than American oak, as its flavour contributions are thought to be more balanced.

By the 2020s traditional barrel-ageing of sour beers had been partly superseded by kettle souring, a rapid process where Lactobacillus is added to the beer during the production process.

== Gallery of barrel ageing facilities ==
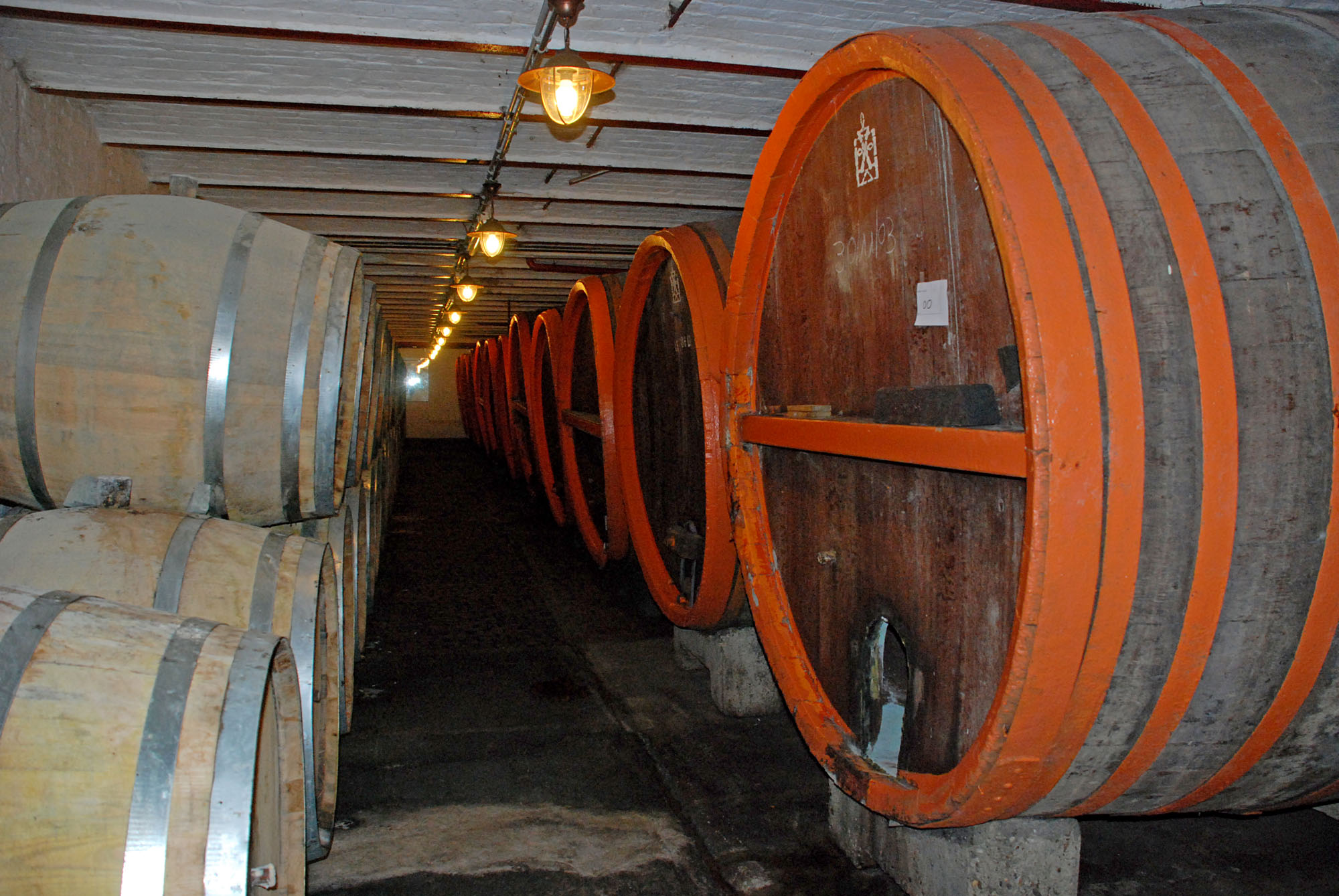
Timmermans
Itterbeek, Belgium

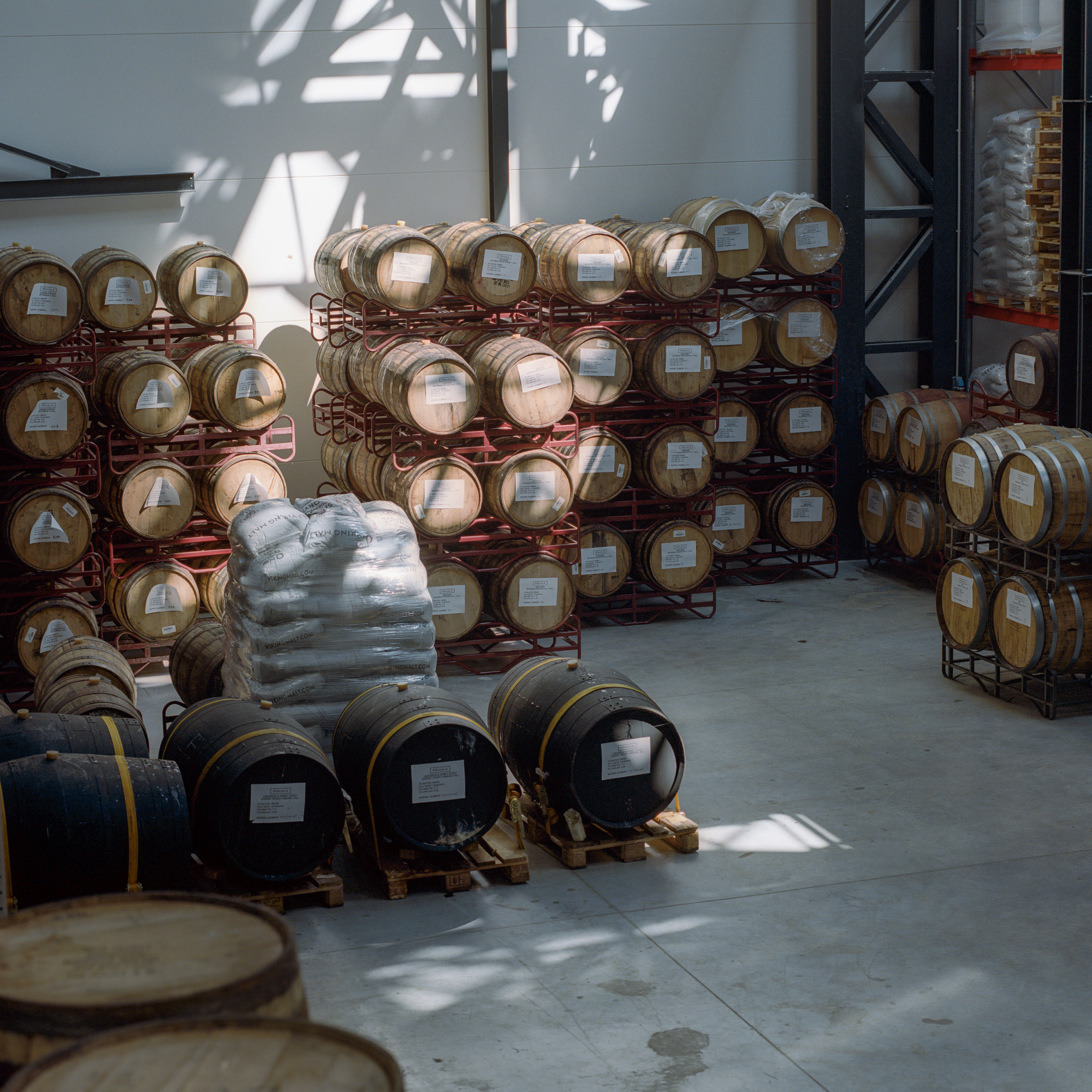
Põhjala
Tallinn, Estonia

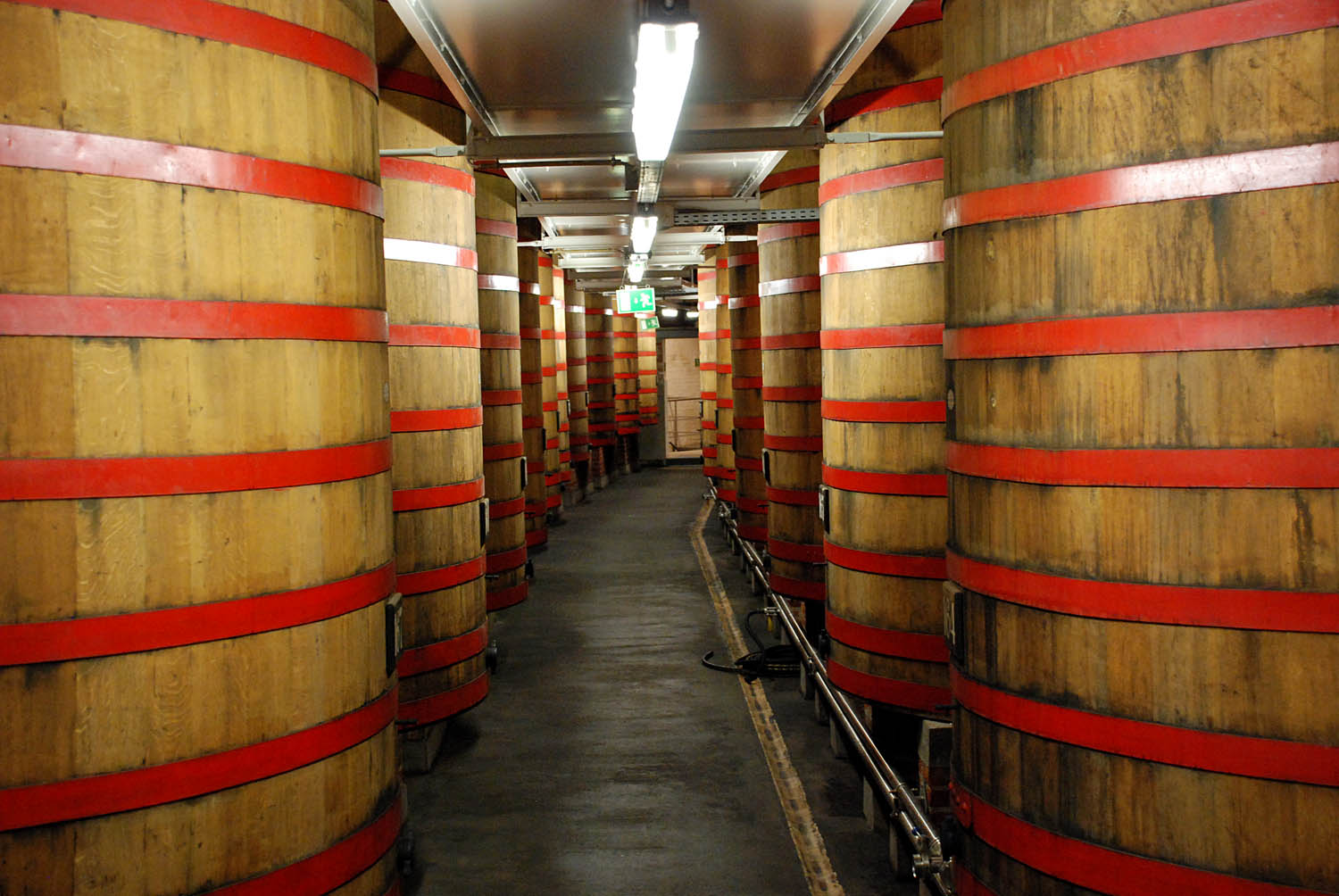
Rodenbach
Roeselare, Belgium

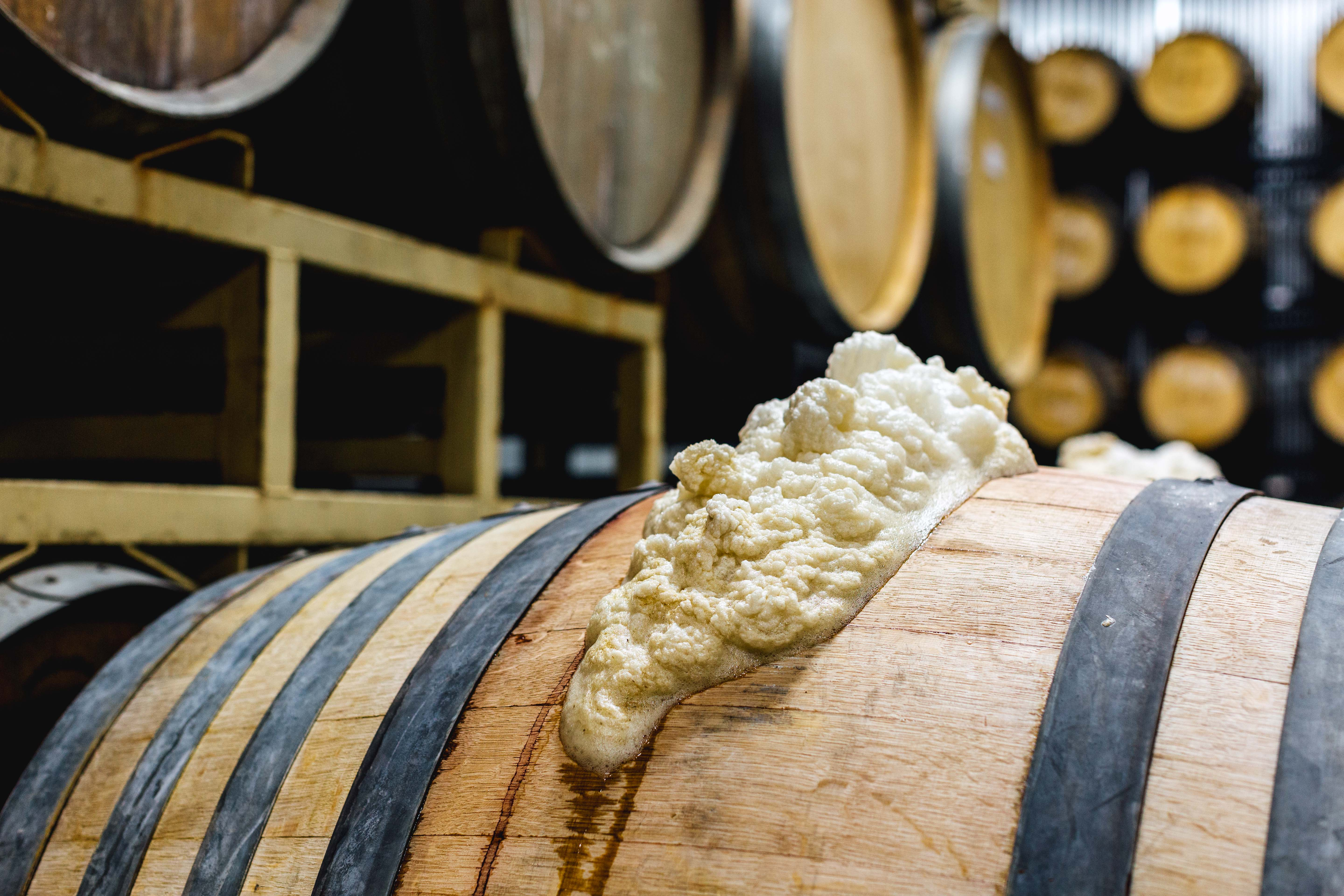
Allagash
Portland, Maine

== Wood ageing ==
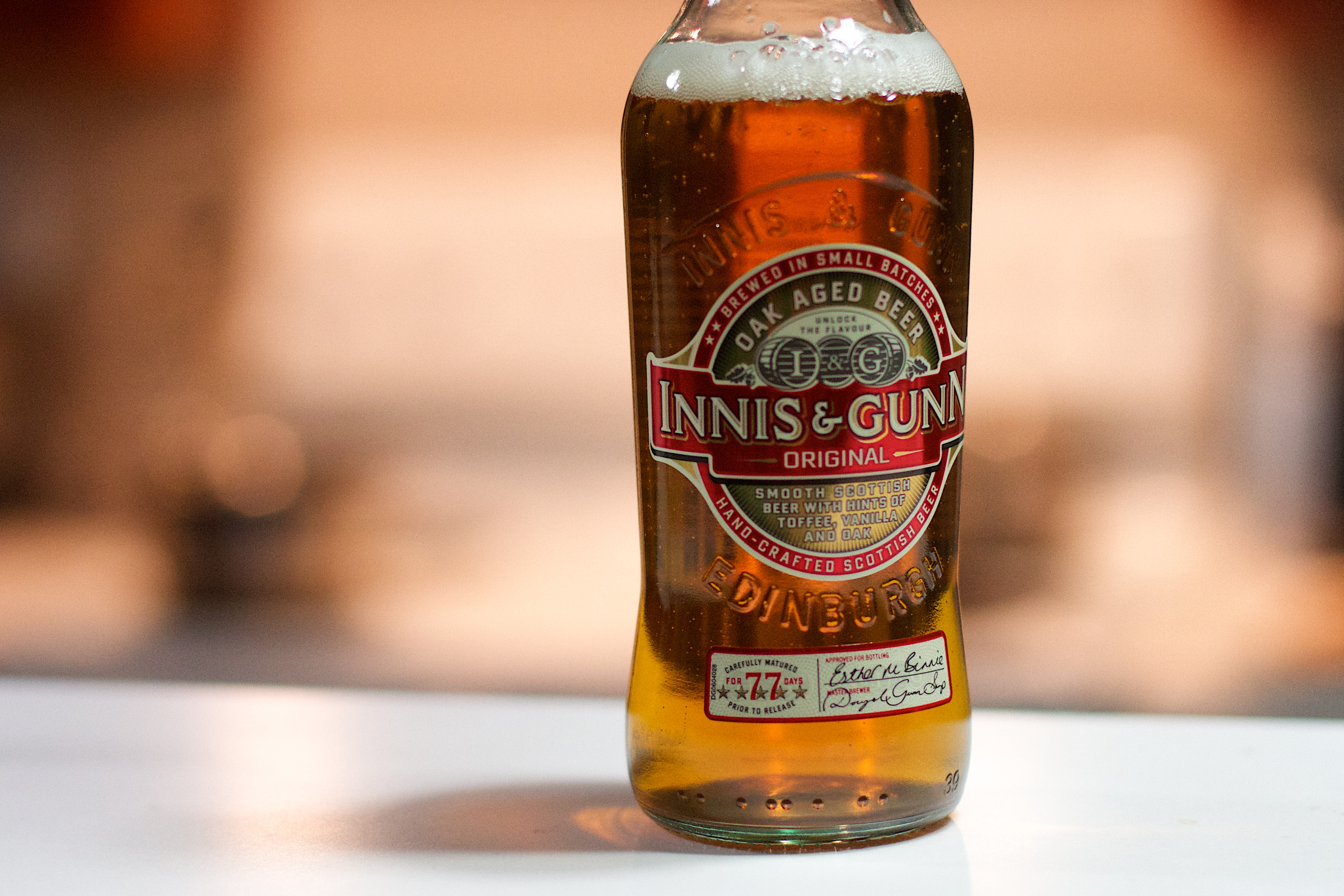
Innis & Gunn's oak-aged beers are an export success for the Scottish brewery.

Wood-ageing is a more manageable option than barrel-ageing for home brewers. They sometimes add cubes, chips or spirals of wood directly into their beers to add bitterness and character. These products are also useful to commercial brewers desiring new wood flavours, and their beers are often labelled as "oak-aged." An example is Great Divide's Oak Aged Yeti Imperial Stout, which is aged on a blend of French and toasted oak chips. Anheuser-Busch's flagship brand Budweiser is aged on American beechwood spirals which promote fermentation and speed up the ageing process.

In 2017 Innis & Gunn decided that barrel ageing did not need to take place in a barrel and could be done in as little as five days. They attempted to redefine the term to include a forced, wood flavouring process that only they use and that the rest of the industry does not recognise as barrel-ageing. A backlash from other brewers using the term in its traditionally understood sense ensued and the outcome is, to date, unresolved.

The Beer Judge Certification Program (BJCP) has a category for wood-aged beer, which states:

This style is intended for beer aged in wood without added alcohol character from previous use of the barrel. Bourbon-barrel or other similar beers should be entered as a Specialty Wood-Aged Beer.

== Gallery of barrel-aged beers ==
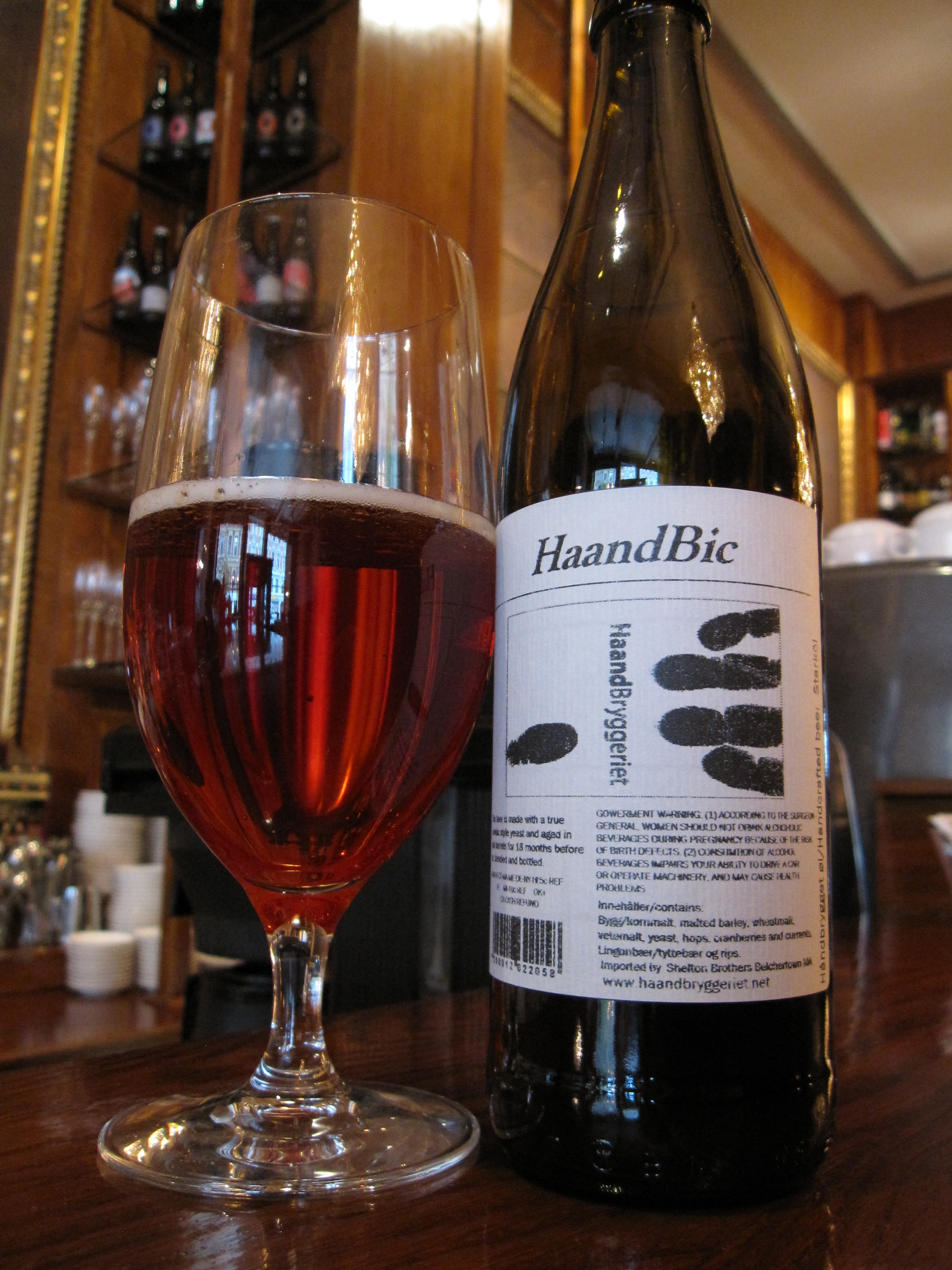
Haandbryggeriet
Haandbic

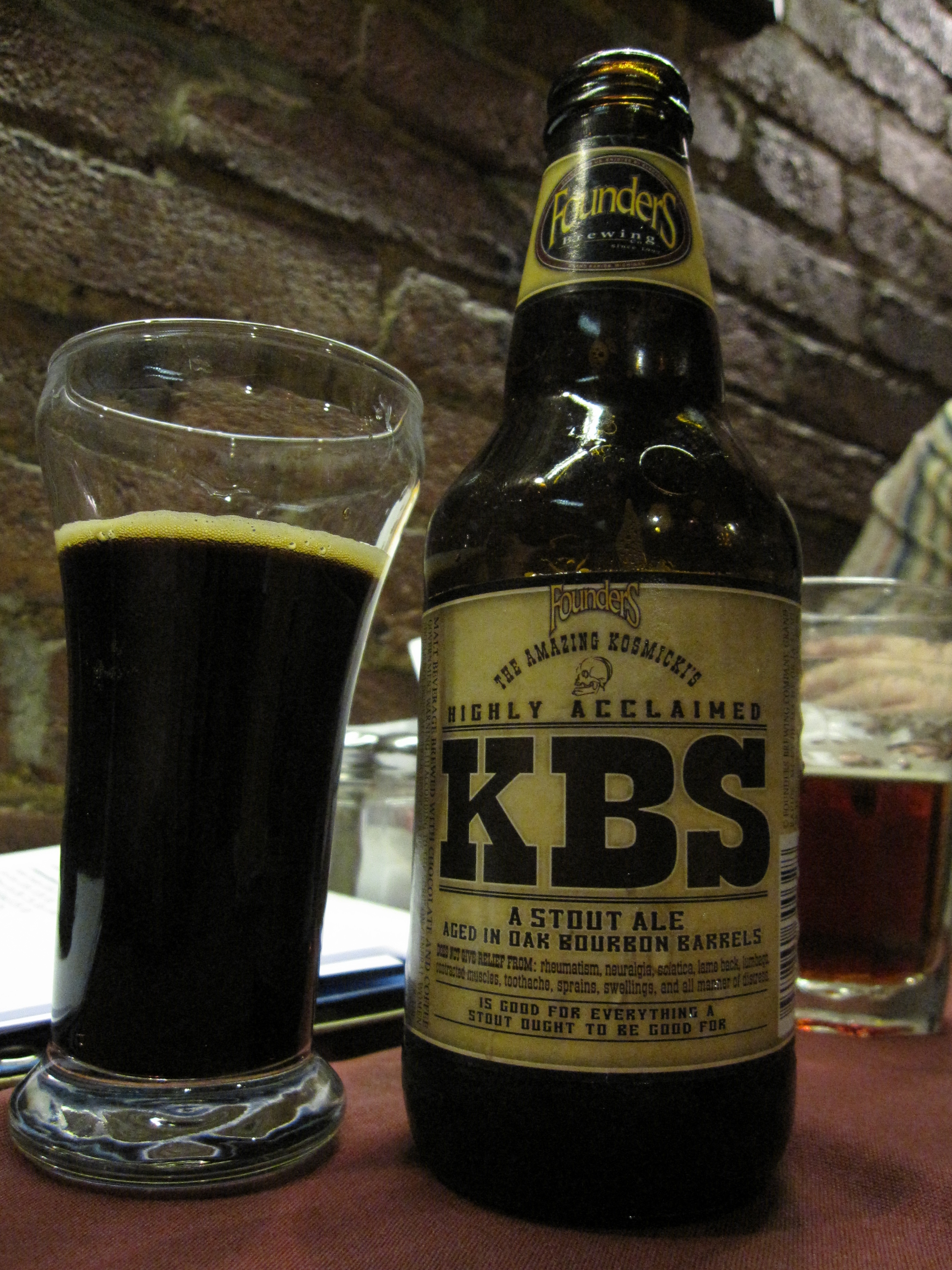
Founders
KBS

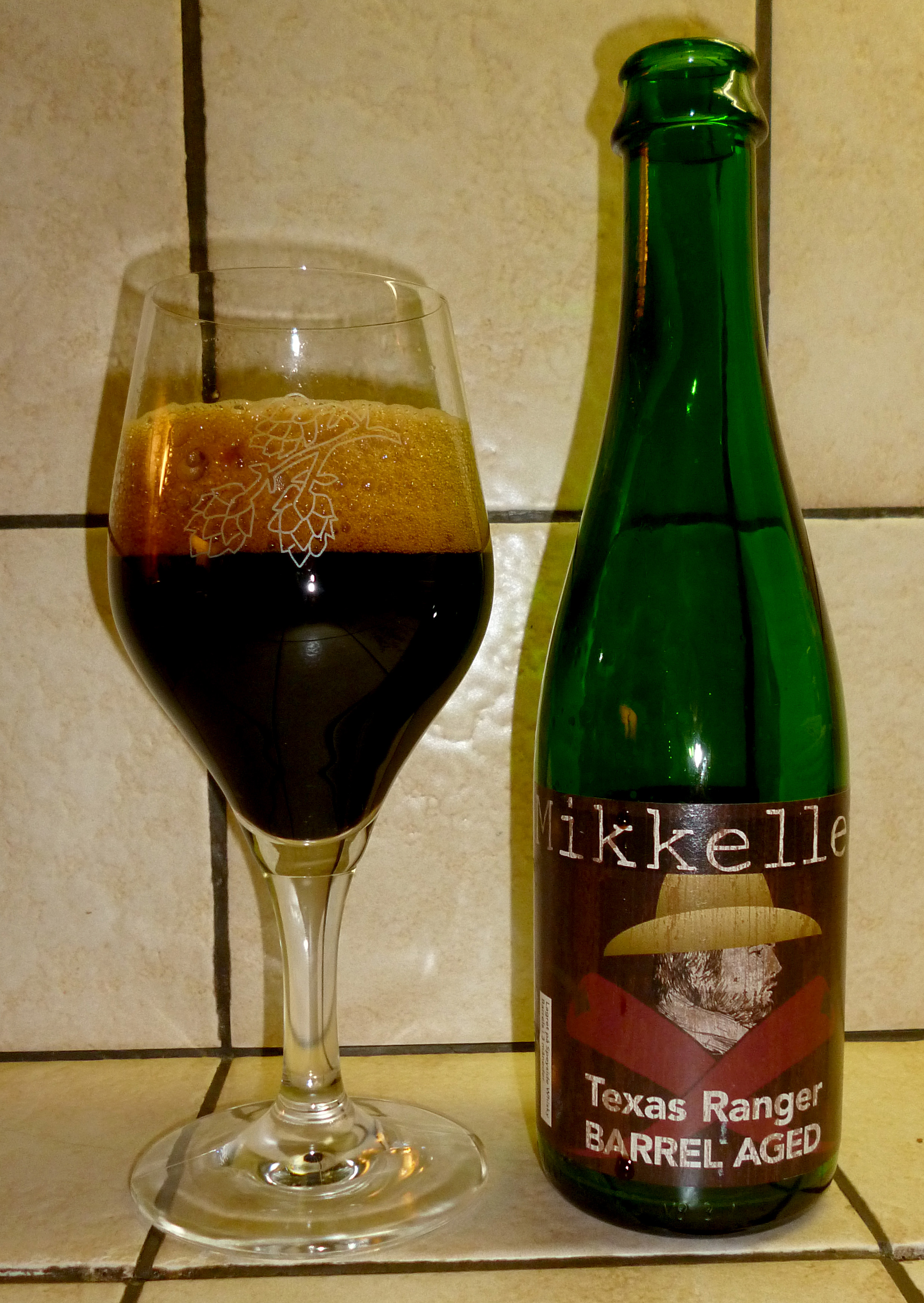
Mikkeller
Texas Ranger

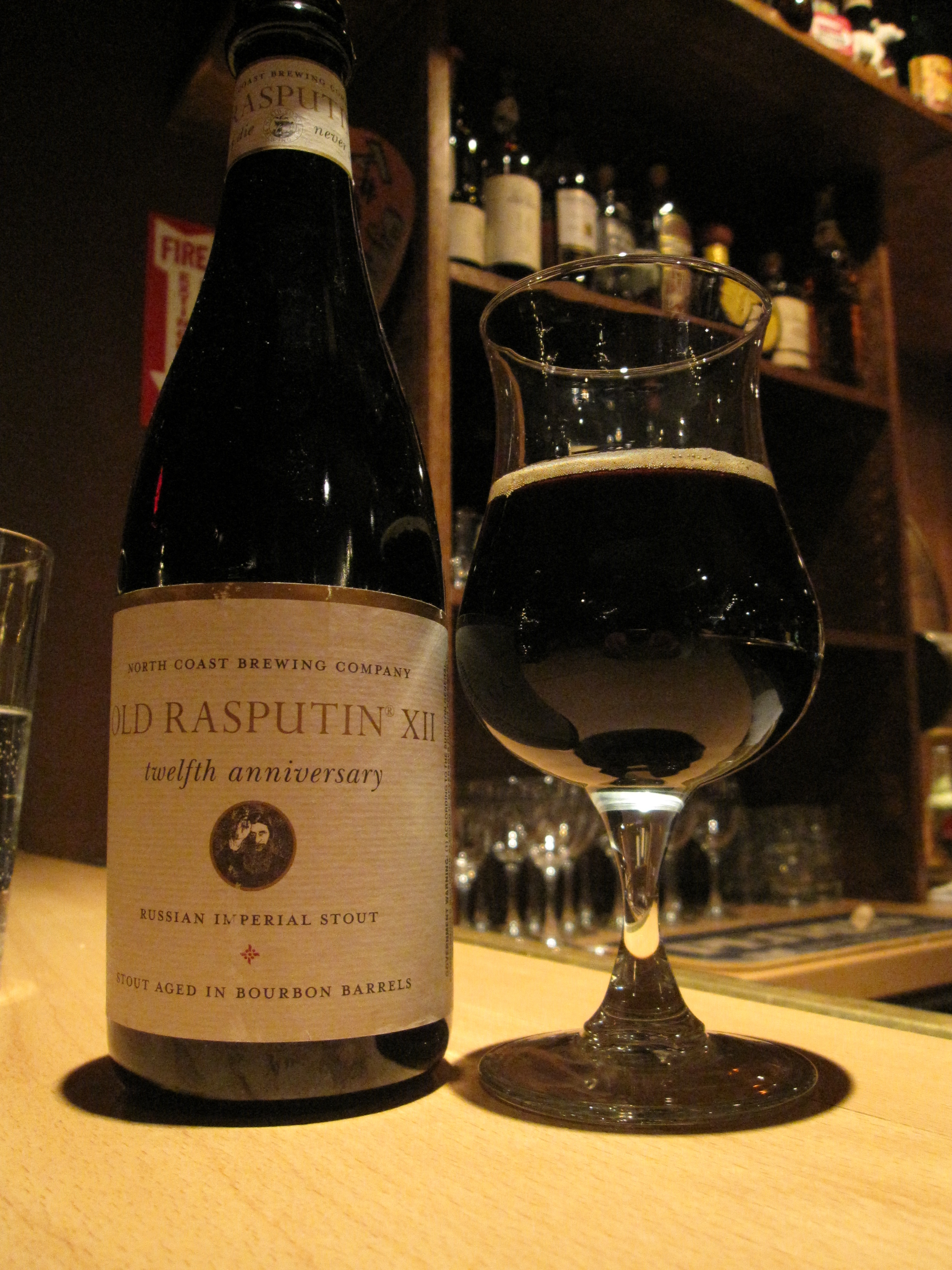
North Coast
Old Rasputin XXI

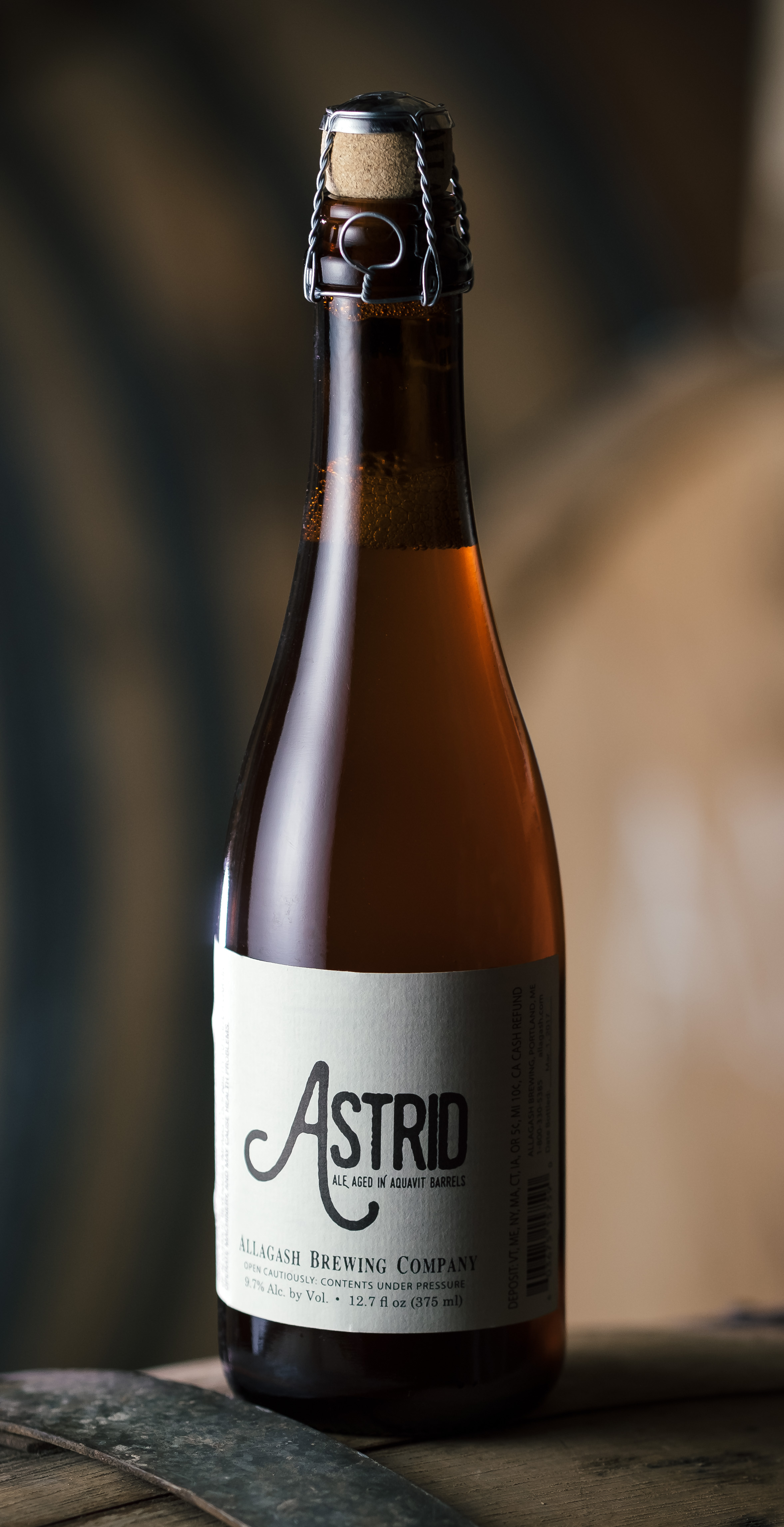
Allagash
Astrid

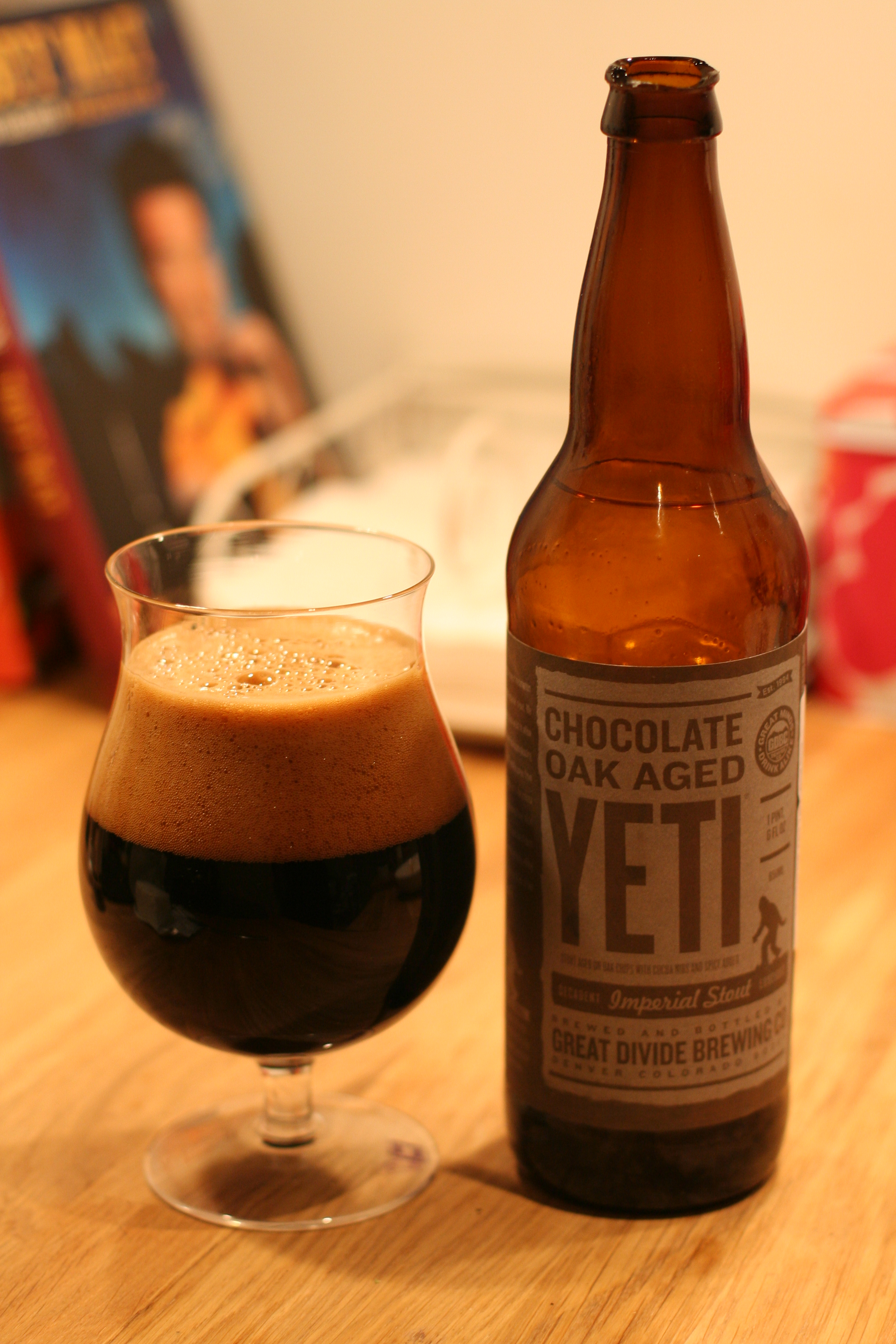
Great Divide
Oak Aged Yeti

== See also ==
- Craft brewery and microbrewery
- Society for the Preservation of Beers from the Wood
- Brettanomyces bruxellensis
- Cooper (profession)
