= ASW Distillery =

American liquor manufacturer

Coordinates: 33.809830°N 84.382015°W

- Type: Private
- Founded: 2016
- Headquarters: Atlanta, Georgia, United States
- Products: Bourbon Whiskey; Rye Whiskey; American Single Malt Whiskey; Double Malt Whiskey; Apple Brandy
- Website: www.aswdistillery.com

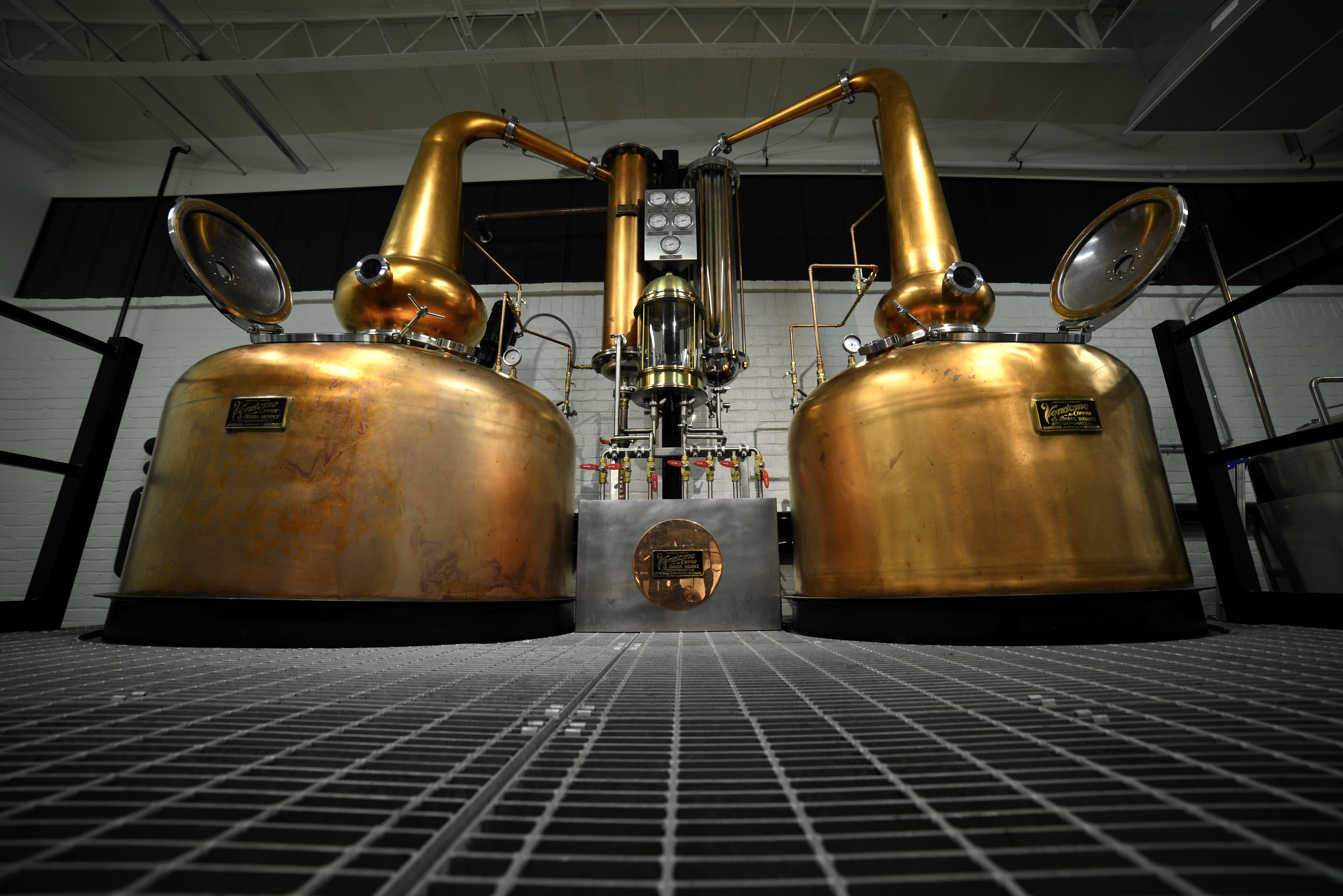
ASW Distillery's copper pot stills at its distillery in Atlanta, Georgia

ASW Distillery is a craft distillery based in Atlanta, Georgia, United States. It was the second legally licensed distillery in Atlanta since the end of American Prohibition and produced the first single malt whiskey distilled in Atlanta. In 2018, the distillery's Duality Double Malt Whiskey became Georgia's first-ever Double Gold Medal Whiskey, as judged by the San Francisco World Spirits Competition.

== History ==
ASW Distillery was founded in 2011 by Jim Chasteen and Charlie Thompson, and introduced its first commercial product, American Spirit Whiskey, to the Atlanta market later that year.

== Facilities ==
The distillery operates, along with a tasting room, in 6,500 square feet of a retrofitted industrial space in Atlanta's Armour Yard district, near SweetWater Brewery.

== Production ==
ASW Distillery makes its spirits in small batches, predominantly in copper pot stills, including a 500-gallon wash still and a 300-gallon spirit still manufactured by the Louisville, Kentucky-based Vendome Copper & Brass Works. In addition to the spirits ASW Distillery distills at its Atlanta facility, it has a line of whiskies sourced from across the country that the distillery then finishes in-house, known as Fiddler. For the spirits that ASW Distillery distills on-site, the distillery works with smoked malts, uses corn from Riverview Farms in Ranger, Georgia, apples from north Georgia, and staves from oak trees that the company hand-harvested in Jackson County, Georgia.

== Products ==
American Spirit Whiskey was the first commercial offering from ASW Distillery, introduced to the Atlanta market in late 2011. American Spirit Whiskey is not distilled in Atlanta, but is an 80 proof spirit whiskey distilled in Charleston, South Carolina using a recipe created by the founders of ASW Distillery in 2010. It is described as having "a soft minerality to it and, like the nose, a slight fruitiness."

Fiddler Bourbon was the first bourbon offering from ASW Distillery, introduced to the Atlanta market in late 2016. Fiddler Unison Bourbon is a marriage of a high-malt bourbon distilled in Atlanta and a "foraged" high-wheat bourbon. Fiddler Georgia Heartwood Bourbon finishes the "foraged" high-wheat bourbon on Georgia oak harvested and hand-charred by ASW Distillery's Head Distiller. Fiddler Unison Bourbon won a silver medal and Fiddler Georgia Heartwood Bourbon won a gold medal at San Francisco World Spirits Competition.

Resurgens Rye was the first whiskey distilled at ASW Distillery's Atlanta facility and is Atlanta's first rye since Prohibition, unique for being a single malt whiskey made from 100% malted rye grain, in contrast to the cereal rye comprising the base of most whiskey made from rye. It was introduced to the Atlanta market in late 2016. It won a silver medal at San Francisco World Spirits Competition.

Armour & Oak Apple Brandy is an apple brandy made using apples from Blue Ridge, Georgia's Mercier Orchards.

Monday Night is a Scottish-style single malt whiskey made in collaboration with Atlanta's Monday Night Brewing. The whiskey was "distilled in a single distillery (ASW) using a pot stilled distillation process made from a mash of malted grain", which reviewers describe as the "like a marriage of bourbon and Scotch — a good entry point for Scotch newbies."

Duality Double Malt is a whiskey distilled from 50% malted rye and 50% cherry-smoked malted barley. The distillery claims it is the world's first whiskey of its kind. It won a Double Gold Medal at San Francisco World Spirits Competition.

Ameireaganach Single Malt is a series of single malt whiskies, with yeast strains, mash bills, and finishing methods differing by release. Ameireaganach means "American" in Scottish-Gaelic. It won a silver medal at San Francisco World Spirits Competition.

== See also ==
- List of Georgia Distilleries
