= The Rare Barrel =

Brewery in Berkeley, California, US

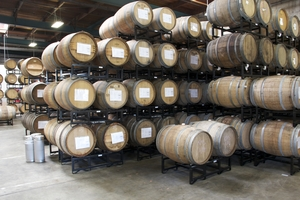
- The Rare Barrel's Berkeley warehouse and tasting room
- Industry: Alcoholic beverage
- Founded: 2013
- Headquarters: Berkeley, California, United States
- Products: Beer
- Production output: 400 barrels
- Owner: Jay Goodwin, Alex Wallash, Brad Goodwin
- Website: Official website

The Rare Barrel is a brewery and brewpub in Berkeley, California, United States, that exclusively produces sour beers.

== History ==
Founders Jay Goodwin and Alex Wallash met while attending UCSB. They started home-brewing in their apartment and decided that they would one day start a brewery together. Goodwin started working at The Bruery, where he worked his way from a production assistant to brewer, eventually becoming the head of their barrel aging program. The Rare Barrel brewed its first batch of beer in February 2013, and opened its tasting room on December 27, 2013.

The Rare Barrel was named for "pH1" a barrel used to make the original batch of La Folie in 2000 by New Belgium Brewing based out of Fort Collins, Colorado. In homage of the original "Rare Barrel", every year the brewery along with its customers and peers select the best barrel of beer and name it "The Rare Barrel" for that year. The "pH1" barrel was gifted to The Rare Barrel by New Belgium in 2015 and as of 2016 is currently active, used to age dark sour beer.

In November 2022, Cellarmaker Brewing Co. acquired The Rare Barrel and plans to reopen the facility late spring next year.

== Production ==
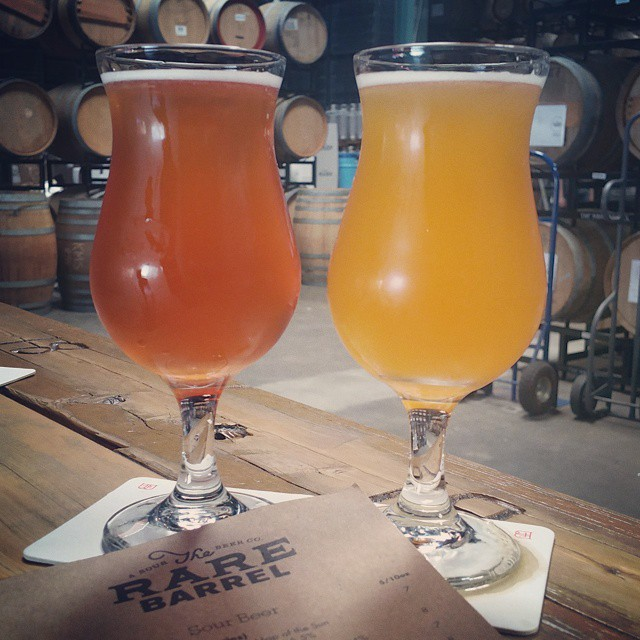
The Rare Barrel sours

The Rare Barrel only makes sour beers which are aged for an extended period of time in oak barrels; all of their sour beers will age on wood for anywhere from six to 36 months. Their beers are fermented with a combination of Brettanomyces yeast and Lactobacillus and/or Pediococcus bacteria.

== Awards ==
Several beers from The Rare Barrel have won gold and silver at the Great American Beer Festival and the World Beer Cup.

Name	Style	Honors
Apropos of Nothing	Gold Sour with Raspberries and Lavender	2015 Great American Beer Festival Bronze
Cosmic Dust	Golden Sour	2014 Great American Beer Festival Gold
Ensorcelled	Dark Sour Ale with Raspberries	2015 Great American Beer Festival Silver, 2014 World Beer Cup Gold
Shadows of Their Eyes	Dark Sour Ale	2014 World Beer Cup Bronze

== See also ==
- California breweries
- Beer in the United States
- Barrel-aged beer
