= Jester King Brewery =

Coordinates: 30.2307°N 97.9992°W

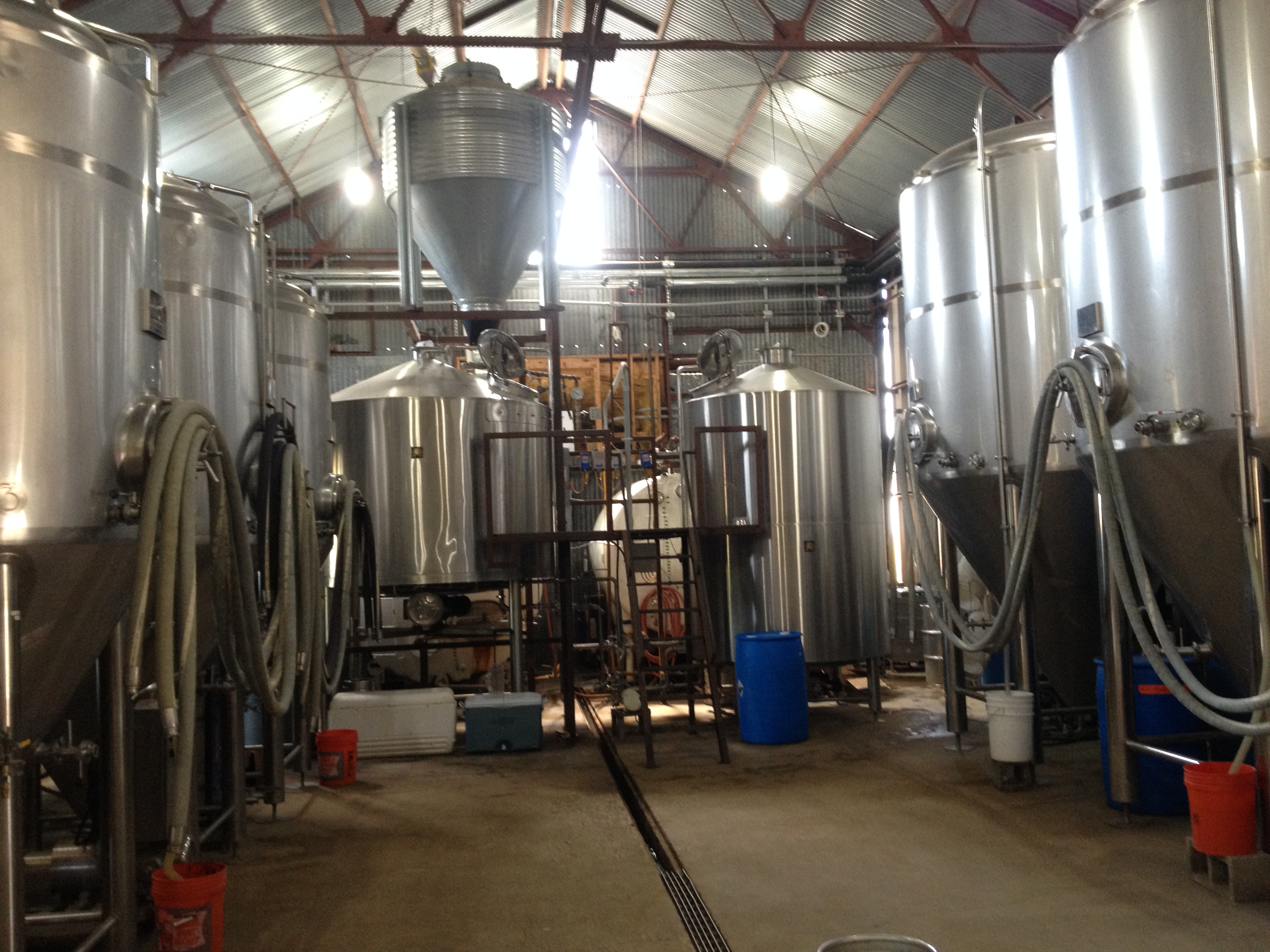
Brewing tasks at Jester King Brewery, Austin, Texas

Jester King is a craft brewery in Austin, Texas that specializes in beer fermented with wild yeast. It is set on a 40 acre ranch about 18 miles west of Downtown Austin.

Jester King was founded in 2010 by Jeff Stuffings and Michael Steffing. Joshua Cockrell was hired to create beer labels, which have won awards at the World Beer Championships packaging competition.

In 2011 Jester King won a lawsuit against the Texas Alcoholic Beverage Commission, which had prohibited beverages with an alcohol content greater than 4% from being labeled as "beer". In honor of their legal campaign against regulation, the Brewers Association in 2014 presented Jester King with their F.X. Matt Defense of the Small Brewing Industry Award. In December 2011, Jester King recalled a batch of its Commercial Suicide beer due to excessive gushing caused by over carbonation.

In January 2016, Jester King purchased 58 acres of land surrounding their facility. At the time, Stuffings said the company was planning to enlarge the brewery and add a winery, a distillery and a farm-to-table restaurant to the complex.

In December 2019, Jester King was named the number 1 brewery in Texas in the inaugural Texas Craft Beer Report published by the analytics organization Hopalytics.

== See also ==
- Méthode Traditionnelle (beer)
- American wild ale
- Barrel-aged beer
