= Goose Island Brewery =

Brewery located in Chicago, Illinois, US

Goose Island Beer Company
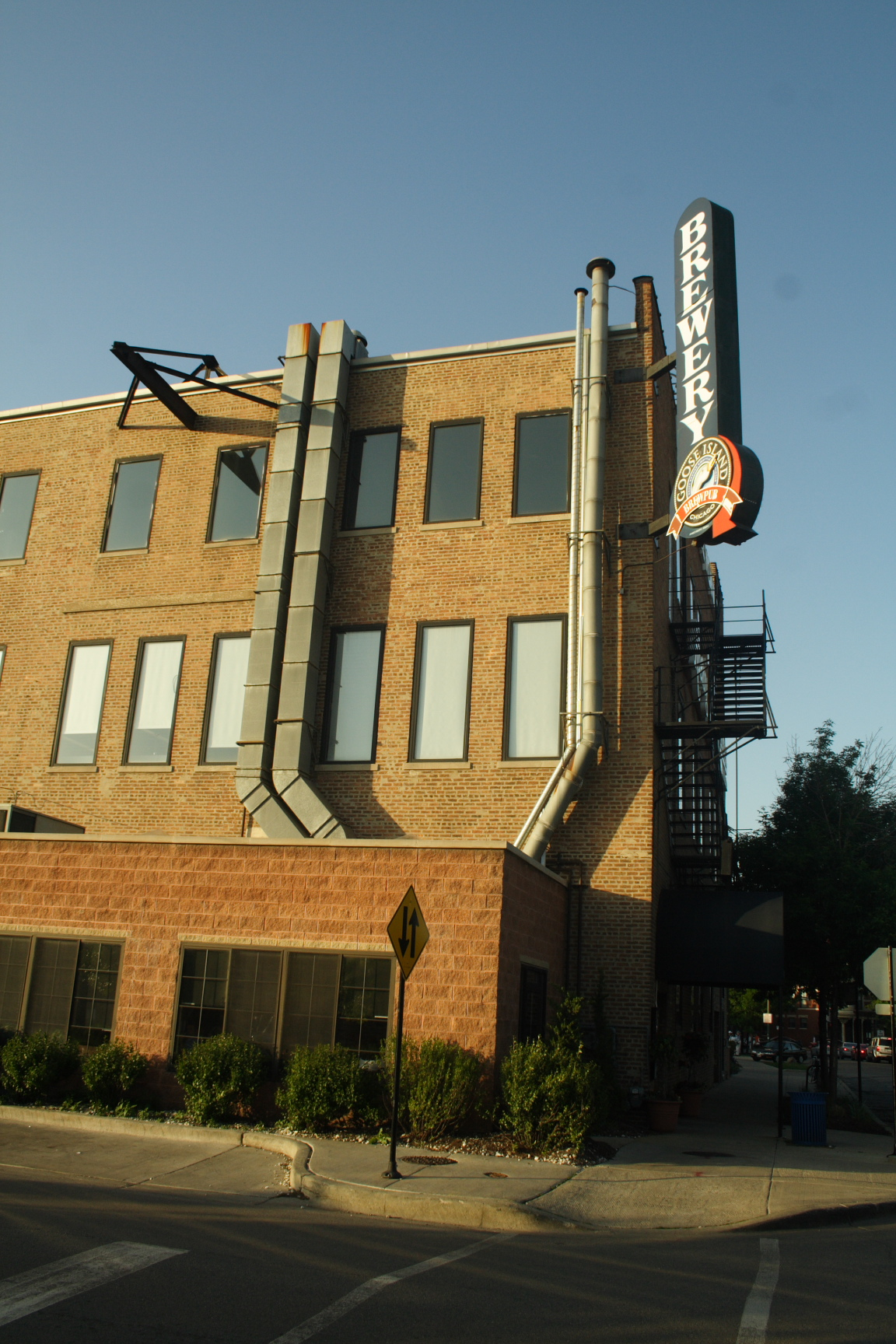
- The Original Goose Island Brewpub on Clybourn Ave. opened in 1988
- Interactive map of Goose Island Beer Company
- Location: Chicago, Illinois; United States
- Coordinates: 41.887133°N 87.672134°W
- Opened: 1988
- Key people: John Hall (Founder); Todd Ahsmann (President); Daryl Hoedtke (Brewmaster)
- Owner: Anheuser-Busch InBev
- Website: gooseisland.com

Active beers
Name	Type
Goose IPA	India Pale Ale
312 Wheat Ale	Wheat ale
Honkers Ale	English Bitter
Sofie	Belgian Farmhouse Ale
Matilda	Belgian Pale Ale
Bourbon County Stout	Bourbon Barrel Aged Stout

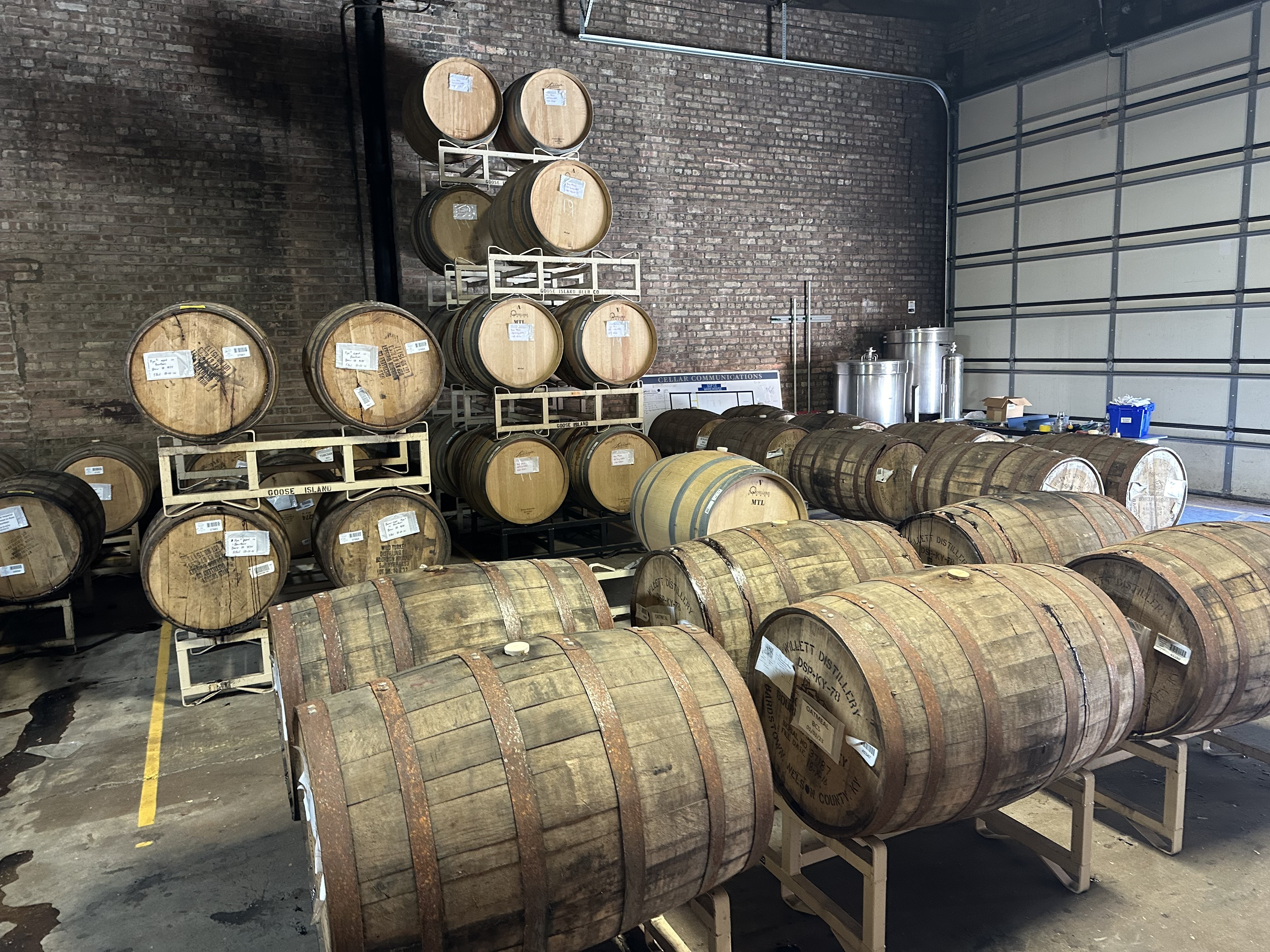
Aging barrels at Goose Island Brewery in Chicago

Goose Island Beer Company is an American brewery in Chicago. The oldest currently operating brewing company in Illinois, it began as a brewpub that opened in 1988 in the Lincoln Park neighborhood, and was named after a nearby island. A larger production brewery opened in 1995. A second brewpub, in Wrigleyville, opened in 1999 and closed in 2015.

Their beers are distributed across the United States, and the United Kingdom after a stake of the company was sold to Widmer Brothers Brewery in 2006, and the brewery was able to expand into different markets. In 2011, Goose Island was sold to Anheuser-Busch InBev. (Note: Within the Brewers Association definition. "An American craft brewer is small, independent and traditional.") Greg Hall stepped down as brewmaster with the AB InBev purchase in 2011; Brett Porter was hired as the new brewmaster.

== History ==
John Hall was originally influenced by the English brewing tradition and pub culture.

== Brewpubs ==
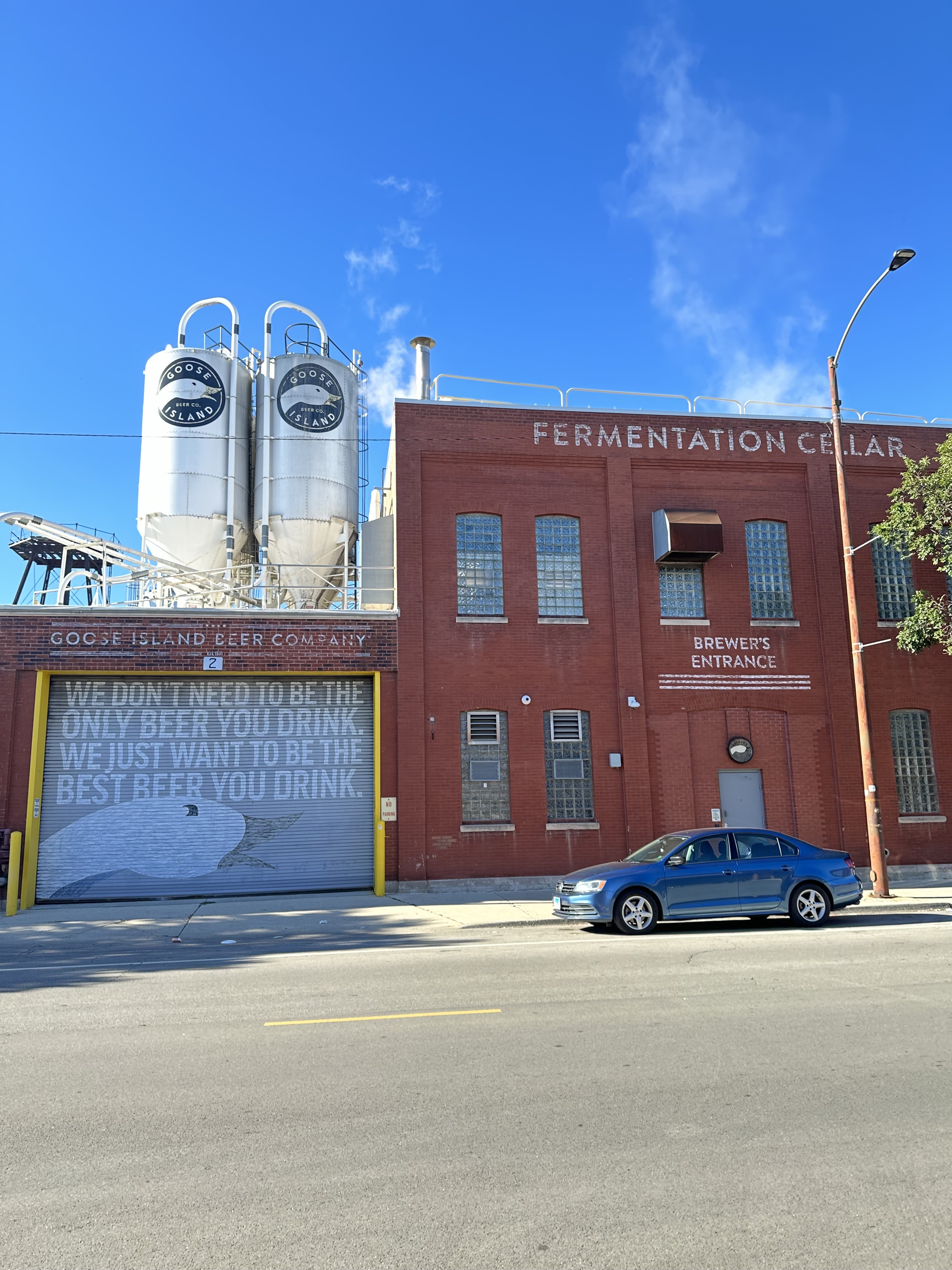
Front facade of the original Goose Island Brewery in July 2024

Goose Island has one brewpub located on Clybourn Ave which serves brunch, lunch, and dinner next to their assortment of beers. The brewpub was sold to Anheuser Busch in 2016, but it still remains a subsidiary of the Fulton Street brewery. The Clybourn Avenue Brewpub closed for renovation in January 2017; it reopened in October 2017, slightly renamed to Goose Island Brewhouse. The Wrigleyville brewpub closed in 2015 to make way for further development of the Wrigleyville area.

The original brewery on Fulton Street features a tap room and offers tours of the facility.

Goose Island currently operates different concept locations across the globe, with brewpubs in Dubai, Toronto, São Paulo, Seoul and Shanghai;

== Products ==
=== Beer ===
Goose Island produces a number of beers that are available year-round, as well as some beers that are seasonal. At different times in the past, the brewery has produced dozens of other beers.

In November 2008, Goose Island made news when its small batch of Bourbon County Stout became available for the first time in the Western United States.

While Goose Island products were originally only available in the Chicago area, since 2012 their products have been available in all 50 US states.

In Europe, post AB-Inbev acquisition, Goose Island Beer is brewed at the InBev brewing facilities in Belgium.

==== Bourbon County Stout ====
Goose Island's Bourbon County Stout was one of the first bourbon barrel-aged beers. It was first produced by Greg Hall in Chicago in 1992, when Jim Beam gave the brewer a couple of used barrels; however, according to Hall's assistant brewmaster and other pieces of evidence, it may not have been produced until 1995. Goose Island's Brett Porter said: "We let the warehouse run to Chicago temperatures—cold winters, followed by hot humid summers—that causes the staves in our bourbon barrels to bring in and then force out liquid, and that's where the flavor comes from".

Every year in late November, Goose Island releases its series of Bourbon County Stouts, consisting of the classic Bourbon County Stout and its variants.

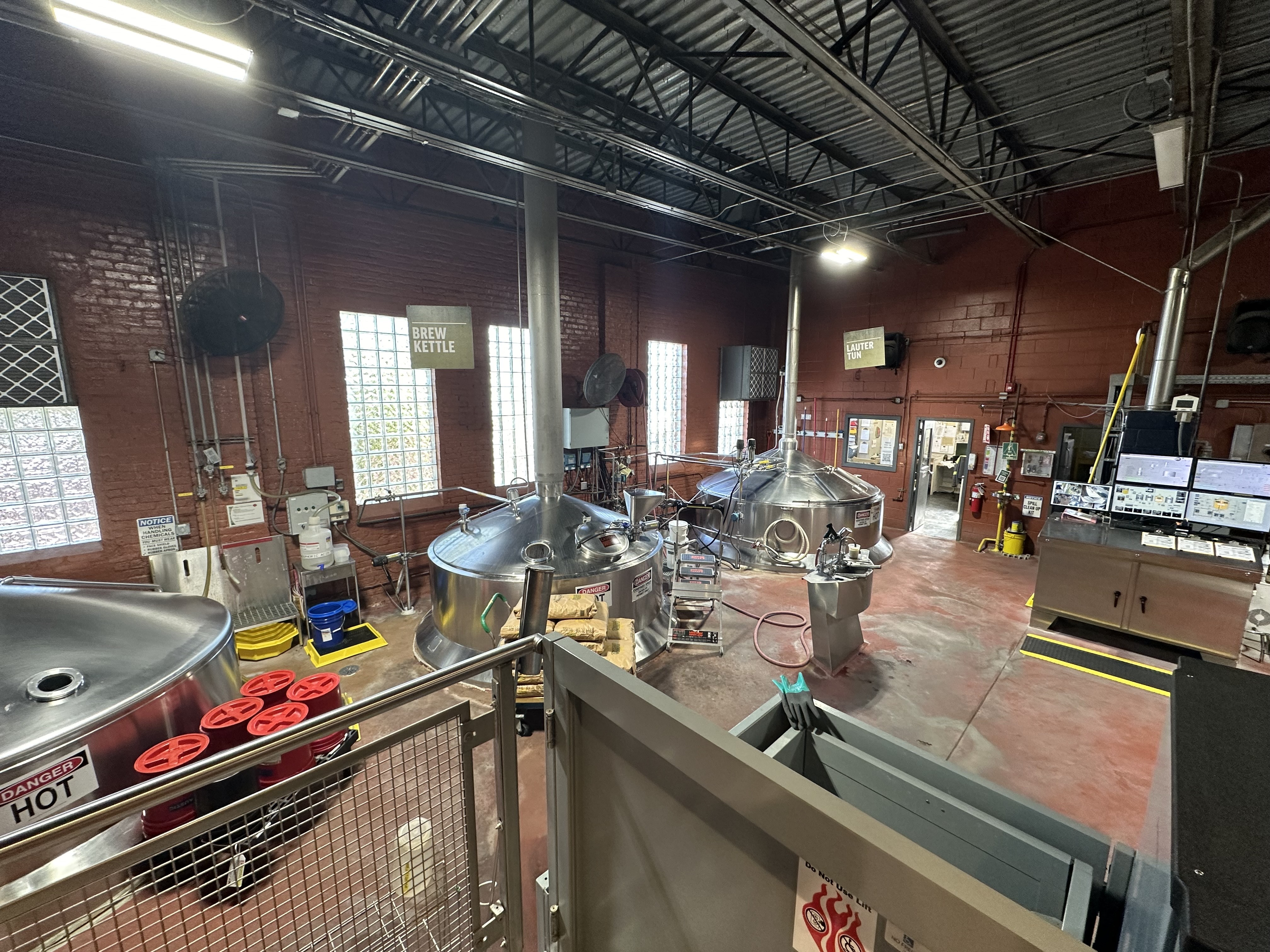
Brew kettles at Goose Island Brewery on Fulton St

=== Soda ===
For several years, the WIT Beverage Company licensed the Goose Island name for a craft soda line. The branding was changed to WBC Craft Sodas following the expiration of the Goose Island licensing in 2013.
