= Great Divide Brewing Company =

- Industry: Alcoholic beverage
- Founded: 1994
- Founder: Brian Dunn
- Headquarters: Denver, Colorado, USA
- Products: Beer
- Website: http://www.greatdivide.com

Great Divide Brewing Company was founded by Brian Dunn in 1994 in Denver, Colorado, USA. Three months after brewing its first batch of beer, it won the first of the brewery's twelve Great American Beer Festival and four World Beer Cup awards. By 2007, Great Divide was ranked by RateBeer.com as the 23rd best brewery in the world with three of the world's top 100 beers. In December 2008, Beer Advocate magazine ranked them as the seventh best brewery on the planet.

In 2025, the company was acquired by Colorado-based Wilding Brands.

== The brewery ==
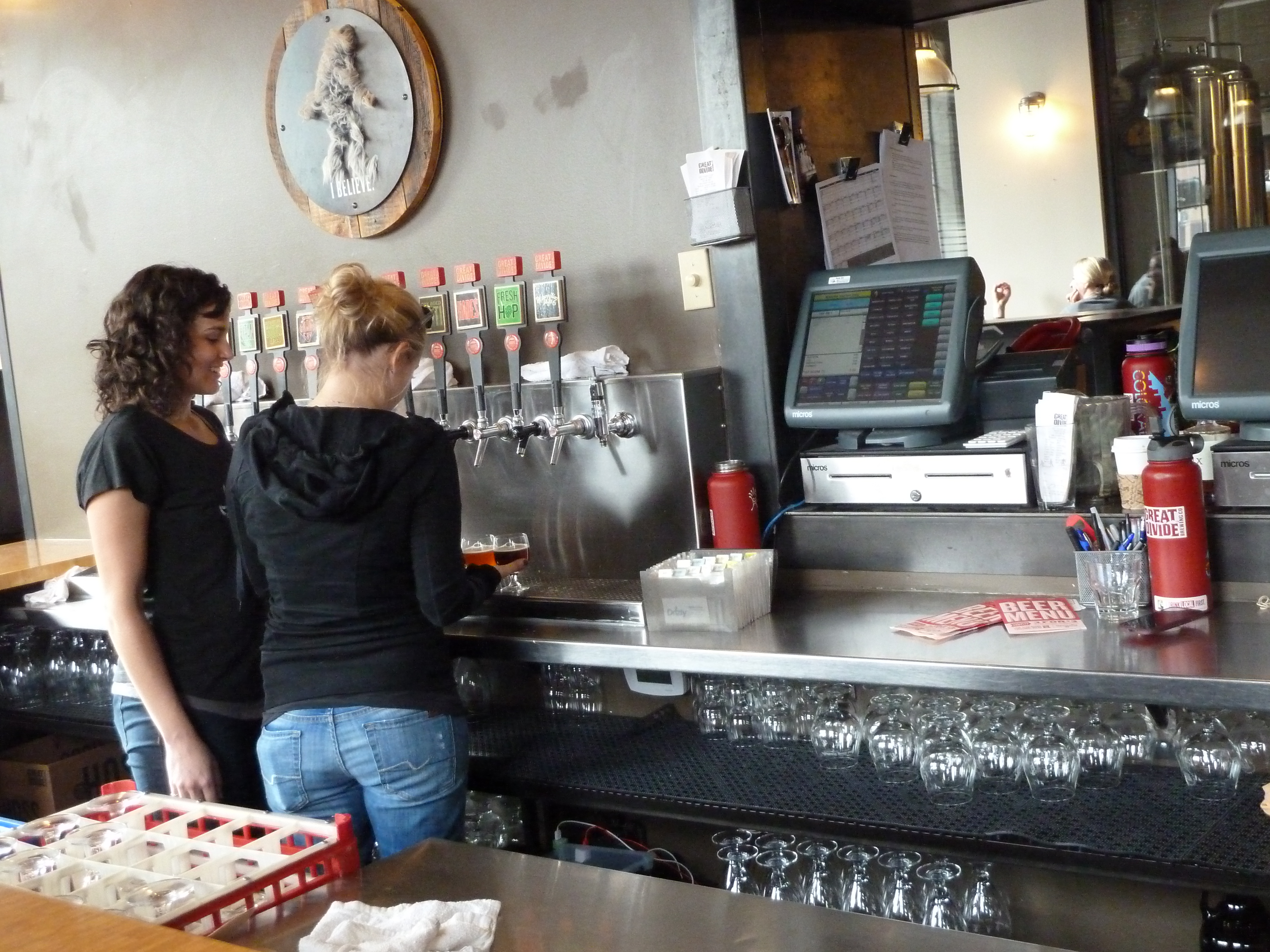
Servers at Great Divide tasting room.

The brewery was founded in 1994 by Brian Dunn.

Due to a 45% increase in sales in 2007, the brewery was forced to expand. In September 2008, Great Divide opened a new brewery that tripled its production. At the same time, they changed the art on all of their labels. The brewery's current branding is marked by sensationalized silhouette depictions of the region from which a particular beer and irreverent humor, as marked by the Imperial Stout Yeti's, "I believe." campaign.

== The beers ==
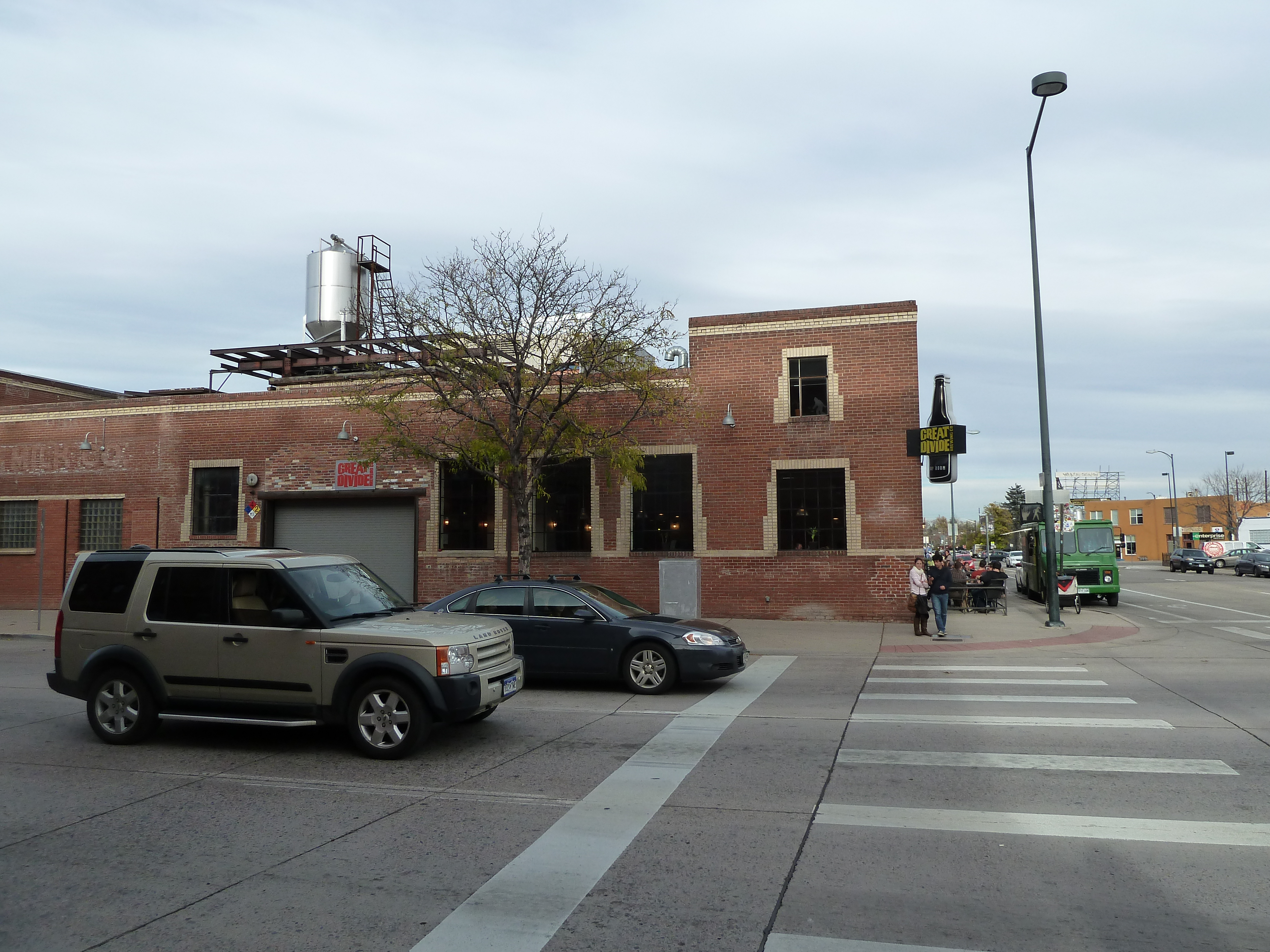
Great Divide, corner of Arapahoe and 22nd Street

Great Divide Brewing Company was founded with the notion of brewing strong beers, which are defined as having an alcohol content greater than 7%. Six of the thirteen beers made by Great Divide in 2006 exceeded this threshold, and one, Old Ruffian, has over 10.2% alcohol content, which is twice that of America's top selling beer Budweiser.

In 1997, Great Divide beer was used in the NBC miniseries Asteroid.. In 2000, Denver chef Bill Clifford made a Braised DPA Lamb Shank for the White House Tree Lighting Ceremony. When Invesco Field, the home of the Denver Broncos, opened in 2001, Great Divide's Denver Pale Ale (DPA) was one of only three craft beers selected to be sold at the stadium. Dunn indicated that Denver Pale Ale was selected because it had won more national and international awards than any other Colorado beer.

Beers Brewed
Beer	Style	ABV%	IBU
Great Divide Hazy	India Pale Ale	6.5%	
Heyday Modern IPA	India Pale Ale	5.8%	
Titan IPA	India Pale Ale	7.1%	
Colette Farmhouse Ale	Ale	7.3%	
Denver Pale Ale	Pale Ale	5%	
Claymore Scotch Ale	Ale	7.7%	
Yeti	Imperial Stout	9.5%	
Roadie Grapefruit Radler	Radley	5.8%	
Strawberry Rhubarb Sour	Sour Ale	6.2%	
Velvet Yeti	Nitro Stout	5.8%	
Hercules	Double IPA	10%	
Amelia Mary Blonde Ale	Ale	5.5%	
Barrel Aged Yeti	Stout		
