= Monday Night Brewing =

Craft brewery in Atlanta, Georgia

- Industry: Alcoholic beverage
- Founder: Jonathan Baker, Jeff Heck, and Joel Iverson
- Headquarters: Atlanta, GA, United States
- Key people: Peter Kiley - Brewmaster
- Products: Beer
- Website: www.mondaynightbrewing.com

Monday Night Brewing is a craft brewery founded in 2006 by Jonathan Baker, Jeff Heck, and Joel Iverson in Atlanta, Georgia.

Peter Kiley is the Brewmaster for Monday Night Brewing. Jeff Heck is the chief operations officer and Joel Iverson is the chief project officer.

== History ==
In 2006, founders Jonathan Baker, Jeff Heck, and Joel Iverson met in a Bible study group through Atlanta Westside Presbyterian Church. They began hanging out and brewing beer in Heck's garage on Monday nights, and started creating a business plan to open their own brewery. In 2011, they launched Eye Patch Ale and Drafty Kilt Scotch Ale, brewed under contract by Thomas Creek Brewery in South Carolina.

In 2012, they acquired a 20,000-square-foot building at 670 Trabert Ave. NW, Atlanta, next to the Atlanta Hemphill Water Treatment Plant, and installed a 30-barrel brewhouse. In January 2013, Peter Kiley (Brewmaster) joined the team. They brewed their first batch of beer at the new location and opened to the public for tastings and tours.

The brewery's classic necktie theme and official motto, "Weekends Are Overrated," derived from the founders' white-collar background.

== Recognition ==
Monday Night's Bourbon Barrel Drafty Kilt won a gold medal at the 2014 Great American Beer Festival. Han Brolo Pale Ale won first place in a blind taste test sponsored by Paste Magazine in April 2018, beating out over 150 other entries.

Monday Night Brewing took second place at the 2024 U.S. Open Beer Championship.

== Locations ==
Monday Night Brewing has three locations, two in Atlanta, and one in Birmingham, Alabama.

== Beers ==
Year Round

- Lundi IPA, ABV: 7.2%, IBU: 55
- Dr. Robot Blackberry Lemon Sour, ABV: 5.0%
- Han Brolo Pale Ale, ABV: 4.7%, IBU: 25
- Slap Fight IPA, ABV: 5.8%, IBU: 58
- Drafty Kilt Scotch Ale, ABV: 7.2%, IBU: 26
- Blind Pirate Blood Orange IPA, ABV: 7.4%, IBU: 55

Lay Low IPA, ABV: 3.2%, IBU: 30

Seasonal

- Rucksack Hefeweizen, ABV: 4.9%
- I'm On A Boat Golden Ale, ABV: 4.8%, IBU: 20
- Whirling Dervish Coffee Stout, ABV: 4.9%
- Dust Bunny American IPA, ABV: 6.8%, IBU: 60
- Cinnamon Cocoa Drafty Kilt, ABV: 7.2%, IBU: 26
- Nitro Drafty Kilt, ABV: 7.2%, IBU: 26

Black Tie Series

Garage Series

== See also ==
- Barrel-aged beer
