= Hardywood Park Craft Brewery =

American brewery

Coordinates: 37.564569°N 77.4595437°W

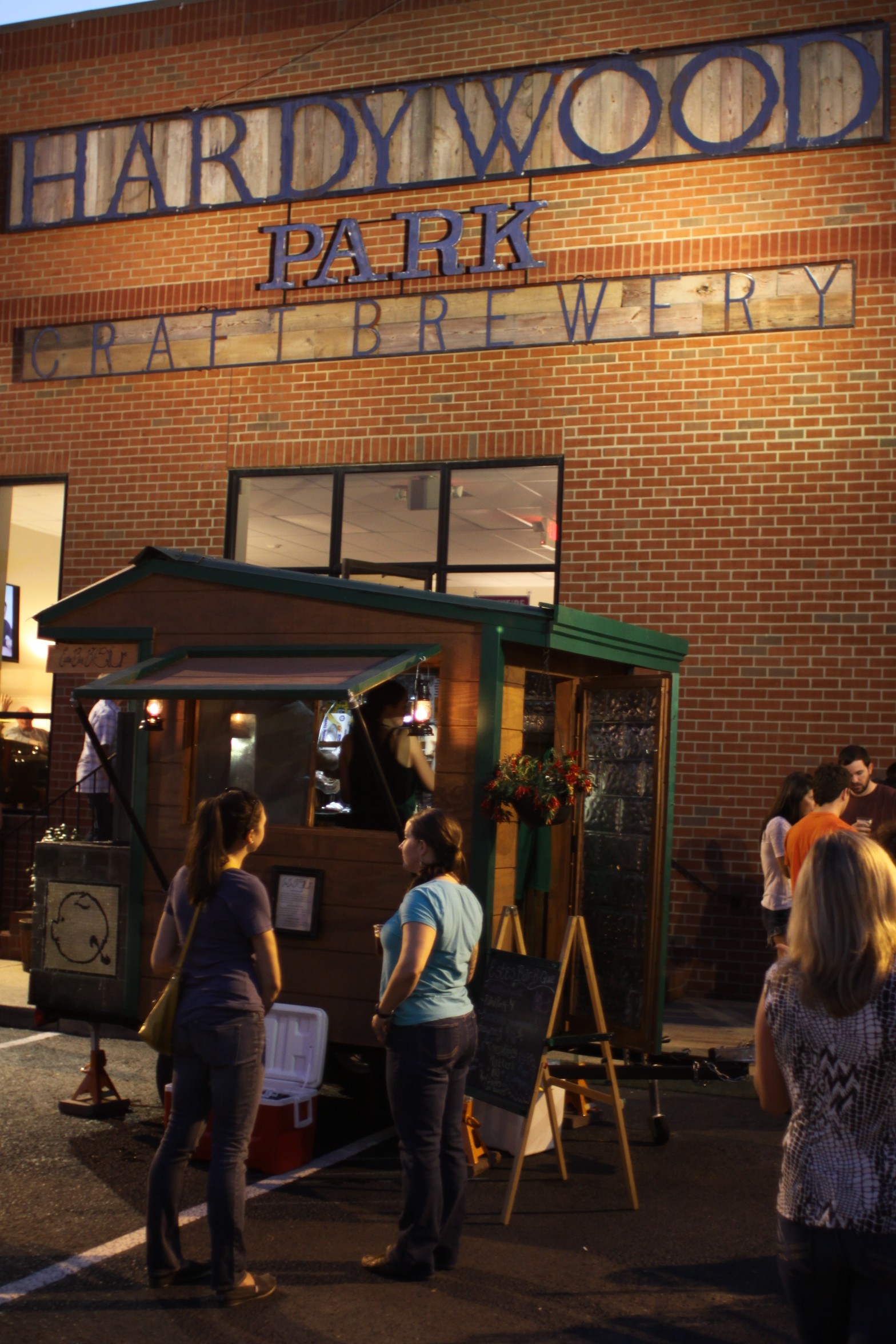
Hardywood Park Craft Brewery

Hardywood Park Craft Brewery is a brewery founded in 2011 and located in Richmond, Virginia, US. Hardywood operates in two adjacent buildings situated between the Diamond and the Fan districts in Richmond.

== History ==
Hardywood Park Craft Brewery was founded by Eric McKay and Patrick Murtaugh in October 2011. 100% of the brewery's electricity comes from renewable energy sources (wind, biomass and solar) via the Dominion Green Power program. The brewery also partners with the James River Association to convert its used beer barrels into rain barrels, and works extensively with CitiWood to hand craft locally "TreeCycled" tap handles.
