= Lovell Bros. =

Lovell Bros. are distillers of corn whiskey from sour mash in the US state of Georgia.
