= Dalton Distillery =

Alcohol distillery in Georgia, US

Coordinates: 34.768891°N 84.967301°W

Dalton Distillery is a distiller of alcohol located in Dalton, Georgia. They produce TazaRay Sunflower Spirit with 65% sunflower seeds and 35% corn. According to Salon magazine they are the only ones in the world doing this. It is distributed by Empire Distributors, Inc.

== History ==
Dalton Distillery was created by a Raymond Butler Jr. He previously worked with his father making moonshine during prohibition, and wanted to continue the family business legally. After being denied an application to open a distillery in Chatsworth, he made a phone call to the mayor of the nearby city of Dalton, who connected him with the Dalton Downtown Development Authority. He named his business Dalton Distillery because of how supportive they were.

To get around the state law at the time that said they could only sell to a distributor and not directly to customers, they would sell whiskey to people as a prescription for medical purposes
