= The Bruery =

Brewery in California

- Industry: Alcoholic beverage
- Founded: 2008
- Founder: Patrick Rue
- Headquarters: Placentia, California, US
- Products: Beer
- Production output: 10,250 US beer barrels (1,203,000 L; 318,000 US gal; 265,000 imp gal)
- Website: www.thebruery.com

The Bruery is an American brewing company based in Placentia, California, founded by Patrick Rue and named as a portmanteau of his family name and the word "brewery". It opened in 2008 and has produced an average of 2,500 barrels of beer annually in their 15-barrel brewhouse.

In May 2017, the brewery announced they were selling a majority stake to Boston, Massachusetts-based private-equity firm Castanea Partners.

== Products ==
The Bruery's products are considered to be experimental ales brewed in the Belgian tradition. Using a proprietary Belgian yeast strain for the majority of their beer, The Bruery creates beers through their use of unique ingredients such as coriander, bitter orange peel and lavender in their "Orchard White" or bacteria such as Pediococcus and Lactobacillus along with Pinot noir grapes in their "Pinotlambicus". The Bruery is also known for their use of oak barrels (both bourbon and wine) for the fermentation and aging of their beers. They have also become known for their strong bourbon aged ales that can range between 13% and 19.5% alcohol by volume (typical beers have around 3% to 7% alcohol by volume).

One beer is a bourbon barrel aged imperial stout known as "Black Tuesday". This beer is released only once each year on the final Tuesday of October and is named for both the economic downturn of the Great Depression as well as the disastrous day at the brewery when it was first brewed. Several batches are brewed and aged in oak barrels to later be blended to taste and bottled for release. It was first released in October 2009 and was 19.5% abv. The October 2010 release was 18.2% abv. There are also several variants of Black Tuesday including Chocolate Rain, a version of the beer with cocoa nibs and vanilla beans added to it.

=== Special release collection ===
The Bruery releases a number of small batch beers throughout the year. Often, these beers are only made once and never again, and sometimes they are oak aged beers that are only released once a year. The collection includes many of their beers including Black Tuesday, Melange #3 and The Bruery Anniversary Ale Series. Their Oude Tart is also included in this collection and it won a gold medal in the Belgian Style Lambic or Sour Ale category at both the 2010 World Beer Cup and the 2010 Great American Beer Festival.

== The Bruery Provisions ==
In September 2010 The Bruery opened a retail establishment in Old Towne Orange that specialized in beer, wine, cheese, charcuterie and other specialty foods. They sold bottles to go and also held onsite tastings. In 2013, The Bruery closed their Bruery Provisions store to focus on more exclusively on brewing and managing their many reserve societies. The store was reopened simply with the name "Provisions" and is operated by nearby restaurant Haven Gastropub.

== See also ==
- Barrel-aged beer
