= Bass Charrington timeline =

This is a time-line for the breweries of Charrington and Bass with the merges, takeovers and separations throughout their recorded history.

Brewer	1730	1740	1750	1760	1770	1780	1790	1800	1810	1820	1830		1840	1850	1860	1870		1880	1890	1900				1910	1920		1930	1940	1950	1960	1970	1980	1990	2000	2010
Charrington		1738 Robert Westfield	1757 Westfield & Moss	1766 Westfield, Moss & Charrington	1769 Moss & Charrington		1783 Charrington					1833 Charrington & Head Co.				1872		1880 Charrington & Co.		1897 Charrington Co. Ltd										1962 Charrington United Breweries Ltd	1967 Bass Charrington Ltd			1997 Punch Taverns	
Meakin								1822 Meakin								1872		1880 Charrington & Co.		1897 Charrington Co. Ltd										1962 Charrington United Breweries Ltd	1967 Bass Charrington Ltd			1997 Punch Taverns	
H & S						1780 Hill & Sherratt's		1822 Meakin								1872		1880 Charrington & Co.		1897 Charrington Co. Ltd										1962 Charrington United Breweries Ltd	1967 Bass Charrington Ltd			1997 Punch Taverns	
Stones								1852 Stones & Watts	1865 William Stones				1895 William Stones Ltd							1998	2000 Interbrew	2002 Coors Brewers Ltd	2005 Wolverhampton & Dudley Breweries	2007 Marston's Plc							1967 Bass Charrington Ltd				
Bass						1777 William Bass		1799 Bass & Ratcliff		1827 Bass, Ratcliff & Gretton								1888 Ltd		1998	2000 Interbrew	2002 Coors Brewers Ltd	2005 Wolverhampton & Dudley Breweries	2007 Marston's Plc	1923	1927		1933		1961	1967 Bass Charrington Ltd				
Walker								1846 Peter Walker												1998	2000 Interbrew	2002 Coors Brewers Ltd	2005 Wolverhampton & Dudley Breweries	2007 Marston's Plc	1923	1927		1933		1961	1967 Bass Charrington Ltd				
Salt						1774 Joseph Clay & Son		1806 Thomas Salt		1813 Salt & Co.							1892 Salt & Co. Ltd	1901		1998	2000 Interbrew	2002 Coors Brewers Ltd	2005 Wolverhampton & Dudley Breweries	2007 Marston's Plc		1927		1933		1961	1967 Bass Charrington Ltd				
Bell								1880										1901		1998	2000 Interbrew	2002 Coors Brewers Ltd	2005 Wolverhampton & Dudley Breweries	2007 Marston's Plc		1927		1933		1961	1967 Bass Charrington Ltd				
Worthington				1761 William Worthington						1915										1998	2000 Interbrew	2002 Coors Brewers Ltd	2005 Wolverhampton & Dudley Breweries	2007 Marston's Plc		1927		1933		1961	1967 Bass Charrington Ltd				
BBC								1842 Burton Brewery Company		1915										1998	2000 Interbrew	2002 Coors Brewers Ltd	2005 Wolverhampton & Dudley Breweries	2007 Marston's Plc		1927		1933		1961	1967 Bass Charrington Ltd				
Eadie								1854 James Eadie Co.				1893 James Eadie Co. Ltd								1998	2000 Interbrew	2002 Coors Brewers Ltd	2005 Wolverhampton & Dudley Breweries	2007 Marston's Plc				1933		1961	1967 Bass Charrington Ltd				
Mitchell								1866 Henry Mitchell's		1898 Mitchells & Butlers								2000 Six Continents Plc	2003 Mitchells & Butlers	1998										1961	1967 Bass Charrington Ltd				
Butler								1866 William Butler's		1898 Mitchells & Butlers								2000 Six Continents Plc	2003 Mitchells & Butlers	1998										1961	1967 Bass Charrington Ltd				
InterContinental								1946 InterContinental Hotels Corporation		1981 Grand Metropolitan		1988 Saison Group	2003 InterContinental Hotels Group					2000 Six Continents Plc		1998															
