= Brewers of Burton =

Beer producers in Staffordshire, England

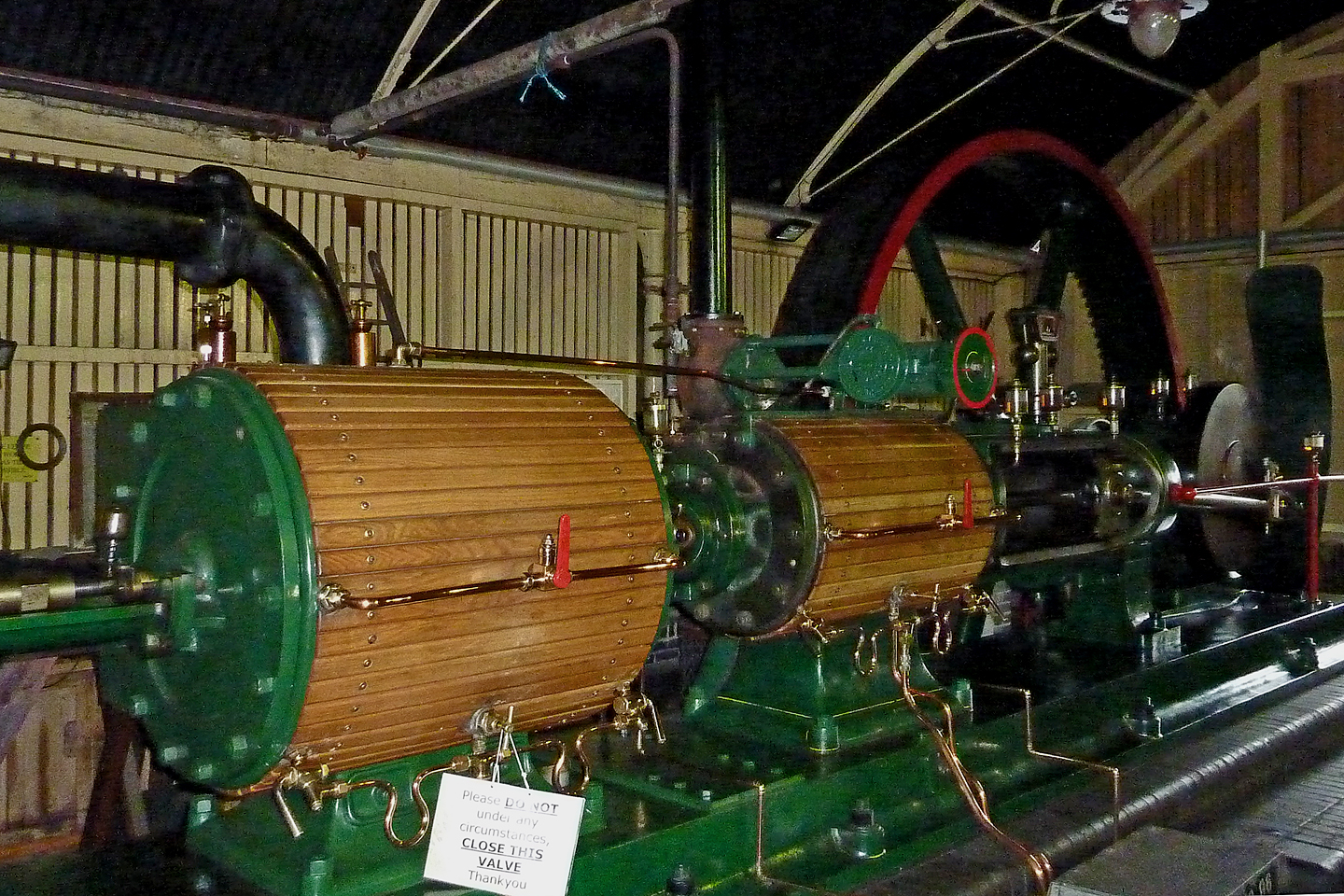
Robey Engine at the National Brewery Museum, Burton-on-Trent

Burton upon Trent, a market town in East Staffordshire, England, has a long history of brewing, at one time exporting beer throughout the world and accounting for a quarter of UK beer production; emulation of Burton water in brewing is called Burtonisation. Much of the town was given over to the industry throughout the 19th century and brewers dominated it politically and socially.

== Brewers and brewing companies ==
Some brewers had more than one brewery and brewery buildings sometimes changed hands. In addition to companies started from scratch, there were also pre-existing brewers from outside Burton who moved into the town in the 1870s.

- Benjamin Printon 1708 – bought by James Musgrave 1729
- James Musgrave (and sons) 1729 – bought by John Greaves 1803
- Samuel and William Sketchley c1741 – bought by Benjamin Wilson 1790
- Benjamin Wilson 1743 – bought by nephew Samuel Allsopp 1807
- Joseph Clay c1751 – passed to Thomas Salt 1813
- Charles Leeson c1753–1800
- William Worthington 1760 – bought by Bass 1927
- Thomas Morecroft
- Thomas Dicken
- William Bass 1777 – bought by Coors 2000
- Henry Evans 1790 – settled on son-in-law William Worthington
- John Walker Wilson – 1790
- Hill and Sherratts c1780 – partnership dissolved 1820, bought by Lewis Meakin 1822
- John Greaves 1803- went bankrupt 1815 – run by Mason and Gilbertson by 1830
- Samuel Allsopp 1807 – merged with Ind Coope 1934
- Thomas Salt 1813 – acquired by Bass 1927
- Lewis Meakin 1822 – acquired by Charrington 1872
- Charles Hill – the Hill of Hill and Sherratt – in 1874 Charles Hill and son
- Mason and Gilbertson 1830-
- John Marston 1834 – merged with Thompson 1898
- Saunders 1837-
- Burton Brewery Company 1842 – bought by Worthington 1915
- Ind Coope 1856 – went into receivership in 1909 and merged with Allsopp in 1934
- Charrington (Head & Co) existing London brewer 1872 – ceased brewing in Burton 1926
- Truman, Hanbury, Buxton & Co existing London brewer 1873–1971
- Mann, Crossman & Paulin existing London brewer 1874 – merged with Watney 1958
- Peter Walker 1876- acquired by Bass 1923
- Sydney Evershed pre-1880 – merged with Marston Thompson 1909
- John Thompson pre-1880 – merged with Marston 1898
- John Bell & Co. pre 1880 – bought by Thomas Salt 1901
- Henry Boddington & Co. existing Manchester brewer – bought by Everard 1892
- James Eadie 1854 – Bought by Bass 1933
- Thomas Sykes 1881- taken over by Everard 1898
- William Everard existing Leicester brewer 1892–1985
- Marston and Thompson 1898 – merged with Evershed to form Marston Thompson Evershed 1909
- Marston Thompson Evershed 1909–1999 bought by Wolverhampton & Dudley Breweries PLC The Marston's Brewery also produces Bass under licence from InBev
- Coors Brewers Limited – bought from InBev in 2000. UK arm of Molson Coors Brewing Company a brewery from the United States
- Burton Bridge Brewery, microbrewery
- Tower Brewery, microbrewery
- Cottage Brewery, based in the Old Cottage Inn

Other brewers existing in 1880 included:

- Bindley & Co
- Bowler Bros
- Carter Victoria Brewery
- Clayton & Co
- Cliff & Co
- Cooper & Co
- Edwin Dawson & Co
- Richard A. Eddie
- Green & Clarkson.
- Frederick Heap
- Frederick C Hill
- Pegge & Co
- James Porter & Sons
- Robinson & Co
- A.B. Walker & Co.

A further three brewers are listed in 1898:

- Beard Hill & Co
- Burton & Lincoln Brewery
- Trent Brewery Co

== Political influence ==
When the town was incorporated as a borough in 1878, the brewers Henry Wardle, John Yeomans, and Sydney Evershed were chosen as aldermen at the first council meeting; other brewers were co-opted, and William Henry Worthington chosen as mayor. Brewers were prominent in Parliament, with Bass, Ratcliff, Gretton and Evershed representing Burton, and Gretton and Wardle representing South Derbyshire. Many brewers were ennobled, including Allsopp, Bass and Gretton, creating a subgroup of the peerage nicknamed the Beerage. Yet an industry that had over 30 participants in 1881 had declined to eight in 1927 and many famous names disappeared from the shelves.

== Brewers and cricket ==
In 1827, Burton Cricket Club was formed through the influence of Abraham Bass, son of brewer Michael Bass. Bass was known as the father of Midland cricket and was a member of the Northern Counties team which played against the M.C.C. at Burton in 1841. In the heyday of brewing in Burton, many brewery companies had their own cricket teams. The Brewery Cup was established around 1894 by the Burton Breweries Cricket Association. A legacy of the era remains in the two cricket grounds that have been used by Derbyshire County Cricket Club - the Bass Worthington Ground and the Ind Coope Ground. First class cricketers from the brewing families, all of whom except the Allsopps played for Derbyshire, include:

- Frederic Allsopp
- Herbert Allsopp
- John Eadie
- William Eadie
- Edward Evershed
- Frank Evershed
- Sydney Evershed
- Wallis Evershed
- William Evershed
- Robert George Tomlinson
- William Tomlinson
