= Brewing methods =

Beer production methods innovated in Great Britain

Beer is produced through steeping a sugar source (commonly Malted cereal grains) in water and then fermenting with yeast. Brewing has taken place since around the 6th millennium BC, and archeological evidence suggests that this technique was used in ancient Egypt. Descriptions of various beer recipes can be found in Sumerian writings, some of the oldest known writing of any sort. Brewing is done in a brewery by a brewer, and the brewing industry is part of most western economies. In 19th century Britain, technological discoveries and improvements such as Burtonisation and the Burton Union system significantly changed beer brewing.

The methods used to produce beer may be unique to a beer style, geographic region, or company.

== Barrel aging ==
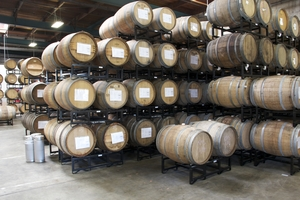
The barrel cellar at The Rare Barrel

Barrel aging is a process used to add maturity and character and additional flavour to a beer. Beers are aged for a period of time in a wooden barrel. Typically, these barrels once housed wine, rum, whiskey, bourbon, tequila, and other wines and spirits. Beers are sometimes aged in barrels to achieve a variety of effects in the final product. Sour beers such as lambics are fully fermented in wood (usually oak) barrels similar to those used to ferment wine, usually including microflora other than Saccharomyces cerevisiae.

Other beers are aged in barrels which were previously used for maturing spirits. Stouts (particularly Russian Imperial Stouts) are sometimes aged in bourbon barrels. Goose Island's Bourbon County Stout was one of the first bourbon barrel-aged beers in the U.S., but the method has now spread to other companies, who have also experimented with aging other styles of beer in bourbon barrels.

By the early twenty-first century, the method of aging beer in used wine barrels had expanded beyond lambic beers to include saison, barleywine, and blonde ale. Commonly, the barrels used for this had previously aged red wine (particularly cabernet sauvignon, merlot, and pinot noir).

Some breweries produce exclusively barrel-aged beers, notably Belgian lambic producer Cantillon, and sour beer company The Rare Barrel in Berkeley, California.

In 2016 "Craft Beer and Brewing" wrote: "Barrel-aged beers are so trendy that nearly every taphouse and beer store has a section of them. "Food & Wine" wrote of barrel-aging in 2018: "A process that was once niche has become not just mainstream, but ubiquitous."

In 2017 Innis & Gunn decided that barrel aging didn't need to take place in a barrel and could be done in as little as 5 days. They attempted to redefine the term to include a forced, wood flavouring process that only they use and that the rest of the industry doesn't recognise as barrel aging. A backlash from other brewers using the term in its traditionally understood sense ensued and the outcome is, to date, unresolved.

== Burtonisation ==
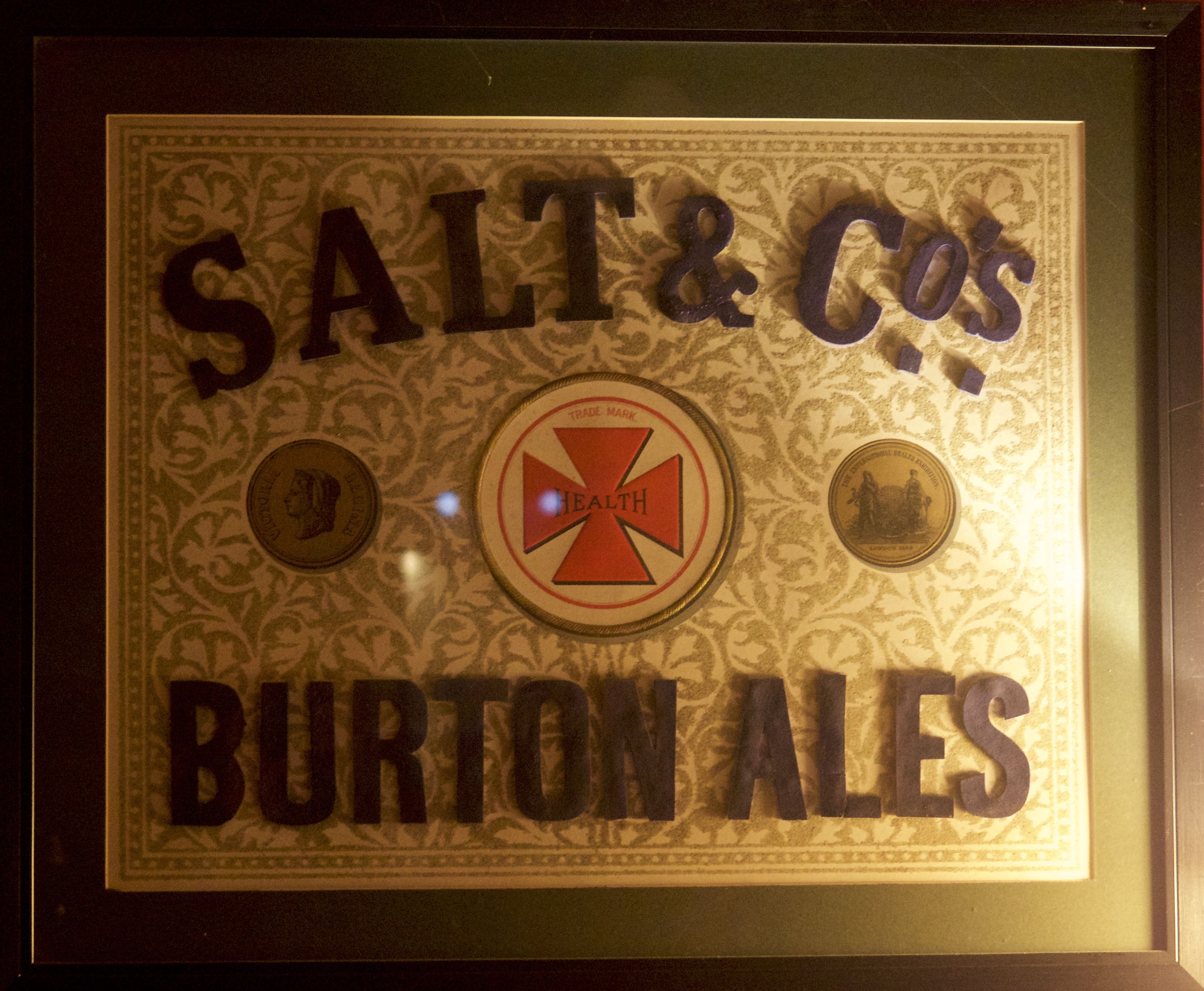
Thomas Salt & Co. was one of over 30 breweries in Burton upon Trent

Burtonisation is the act of adding sulphate, often in the form of gypsum, to the water used for the brewing of beer, to bring out the flavour of the hops. The name comes from the town of Burton upon Trent which had several very successful breweries due to the chemical composition of the local water.

In the early 19th century, pale ale was being successfully brewed in London. In 1822, the method had been copied by the Burton upon Trent brewer Samuel Allsopp, who got a more hoppy tasting version of the beer because of the sulphate-rich local water. The clean, crisp, bitter flavour of beer brewed by Allsopp in Burton became very popular and by 1888 there were 31 breweries in the town supplying demand for Burton Ale. The characteristic whiff of sulphur indicating the presence of sulphate ions became known as the "Burton snatch". Later, the chemist C. W. Vincent analysed the waters of Burton and identified the calcium sulphate content as being responsible for accenting the hop bitterness in Burton Ale.

Burtonisation is used when a brewer wishes to accent the hops in a pale beer, such as a pale ale. It is not used for dark beers such as stout. A degree of sulphate ions in the water is also appropriate for emulation of the Czech Pilsener style, and sulphate ions are also distinctive of Dortmunder Export.

Introducing magnesium sulphate into the brewing water, or "liquor", creates a rounder, fuller taste that enhances other flavours in the beer. However, excessive dosage must be avoided to prevent undesirable consequences, which could include a laxative effect.

== Burton Union ==
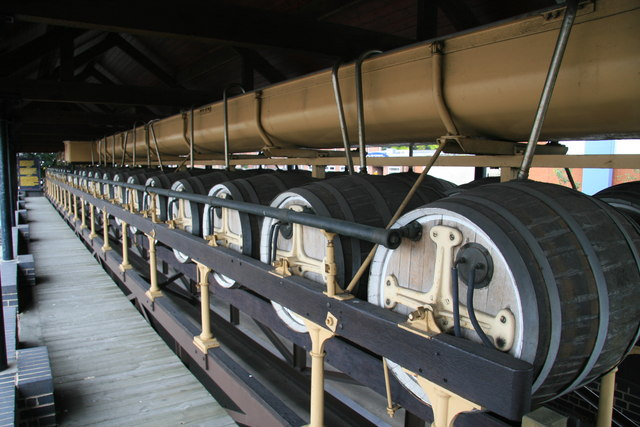
An example of the Burton Union system

The Burton breweries were known for a recirculating fermentation system known as the Burton Union. Invented in the 1830s, the Union system is a row of wood casks connected to a common trough by way of a series of pipes. The practical purpose of the Union system is to allow excess barm (yeast foam) to be expelled from the casks without leaving excessive amounts of head space within the casks; the system was quickly refined to separate any expelled beer from the wasted yeast, allowing it to flow back into the casks to continue fermentation.

The Burton Union is credited with maintaining the strains of yeast used in Burton brewing in a relatively stable state until the mid-20th century.

While not widely used in commercial beer production any longer, the Burton Union principle is often looked on as a technical challenge for advanced homebrewers, and a commercial approximation of the design is available for experimenters.

Until February 2024 Marston's Pedigree was produced using the Burton Union system, when, citing declining cask ale sales and profitability concerns, Carlsberg Marston's announced the closure of the last original Burton Union sets. In May 2024, Thornbridge Brewery announced that with the support of Brooklyn Brewery, it had worked with Carlsberg Marston's to save a 6 x 150 gallon barrel set of equipment.. Springbanks Brewery in Wolverhampton announced in 2025/26 that they had also acquired a 6 x 150-gallon Union Set from Carlsberg Marston.

Firestone Walker in California uses a patented variation of the system and Barrique Brewing Company in Tennessee uses an unmodified Union system.

== Double dropping ==
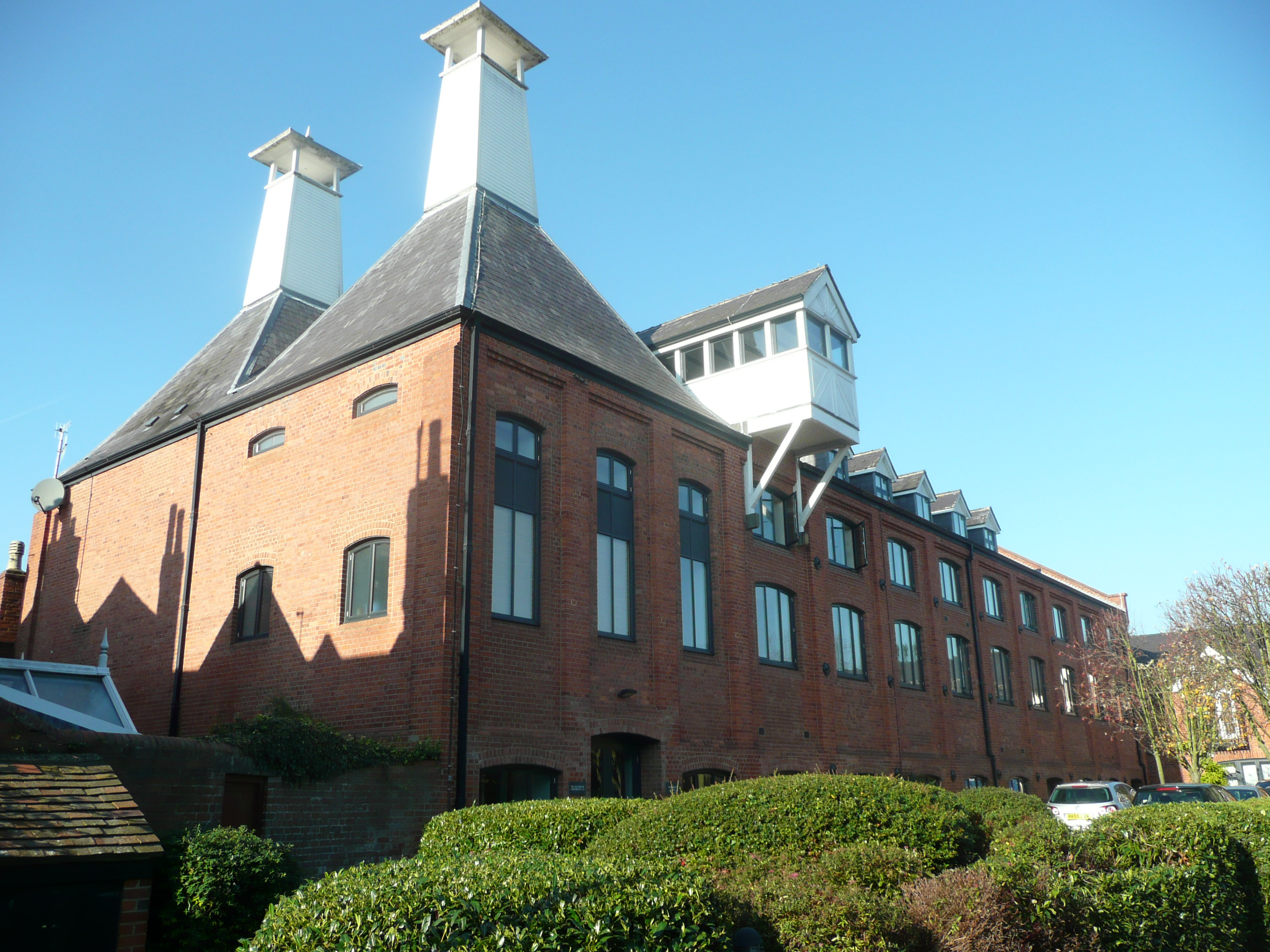
Brakspears in Henley-on-Thames developed the double dropping method

Double dropping, also known as the dropping system, is a brewing method used for the production of ales. During the early 20th century it was the most popular method of clearing trub (inactive yeast and excess, staling and haze-forming protein from the malted barley) during fermentation for English ales. It is less commonly used today as it requires additional brewing vessels in a two-tier system.

During the double dropping process the wort (newly brewed, fermenting beer) is first fermented for a period of time before being transferred, under gravity or by other means, into a lower vessel where it continues fermentation. The dropping process has two primary effects on the beer being fermented: the trub that has settled during the first period of fermentation will be left behind, leaving a cleaner beer and a cleaner yeast to crop from the beer for the next fermentation; the second effect is the aeration of the wort, which results in healthy clean yeast growth, and in certain circumstances butterscotch flavours from the production of diacetyl.

Breweries using the double dropping process include Wychwood Brewery who contract brew Brakspear branded beers, and Flack Manor. Marston's use the name Double Drop for one of their beers as they use the related brewing method of the Burton Union system. Wychwood transfers the wort the morning after the day fermentation started – typically about 16 hours later. This process originally took place at the Brakspear brewery in Henley. When Brakspear moved to the Refresh UK's brewery in Witney, a new brewery was built to include the original double dropping system. Brakspear state that some of the flavour common to its beer is due to a combination of its very old complex multi-strain yeast and the dropping method which encourages it to produce the butterscotch-flavoured compound diacetyl.

== Yorkshire Square ==
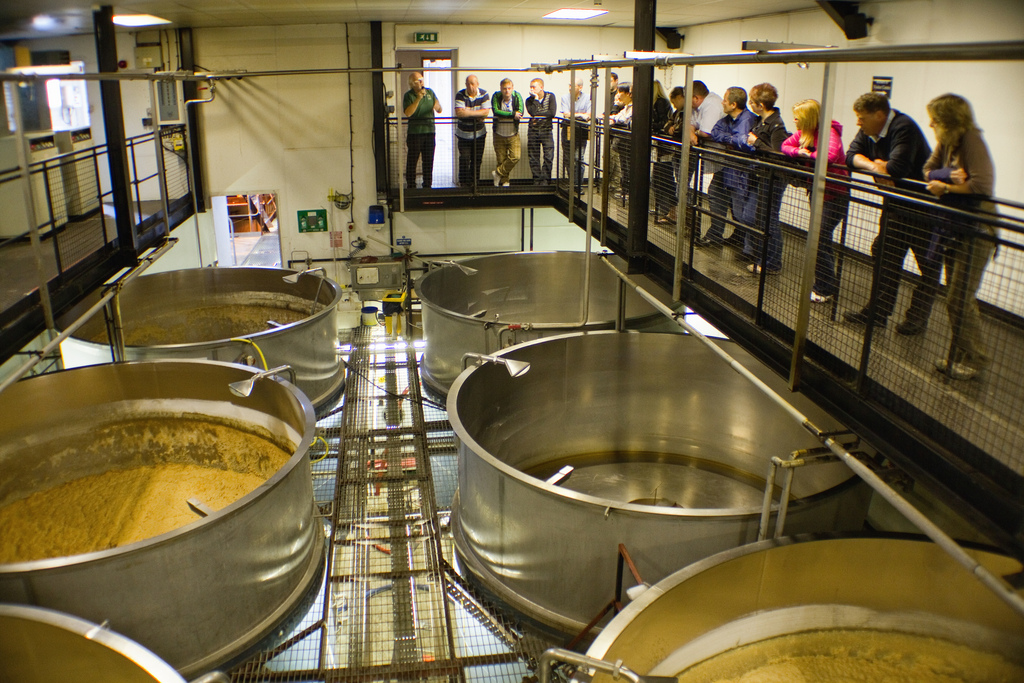
The 'Round Squares' of Black Sheep Brewery

A Yorkshire Square vessel is a two-storey fermentation system developed in Huddersfield by Timothy Bentley, proprietor of the Bentley and Shaw brewery. It is characterised by a shallow chamber approximately two metres high, above which is a walled deck. Cooled wort, the liquid extracted from malted barley, is fermented in the lower chamber, while the yeasty head settles on the deck above. During the first stage of fermentation, the fermenting wort is periodically pumped from the bottom of the chamber over the yeasty head, to keep the yeast mixed in with the wort. Later, the mixing is stopped and the wort in the chamber allowed to settle and cool gently. Most of the yeast rises onto the deck, and is left behind when the beer is drained from the chamber. The whole process takes at least six days. However, beer straight from a Yorkshire Square vessel will still have a harsh flavour, so the residual yeast is allowed to ferment any remaining sugar, producing a little extra alcohol and carbon dioxide, which mellows the beer. This conditioning begins in tanks at the brewery and continues after the beer is filled into casks, hence the phrase 'Cask Conditioned'.

Historically, the Yorkshire Square vessel was constructed from Yorkshire Sandstone, but Welsh slate quickly proved to be the material of choice. A modern innovation is the so-called 'Round Square' pioneered by the Black Sheep brewery, which is built from stainless steel. The round shape makes it easier to clean out (a task that requires personnel to physically climb into the vessels) between brewing cycles. The Yorkshire Square fermenting system dates back over 200 years ago, and is still used by Samuel Smith's, the Theakston Brewery, Cameron's Brewery, Marston's and the Black Sheep brewery.
