= Stones Brewery =

Brewery in Sheffield, England

William Stones Ltd
- Company type: Brewery
- Industry: Brewing
- Predecessor: Messrs. Watts & Stones
- Founded: 1868
- Founder: William Stones
- Defunct: 1968 (takeover by Bass) 1999 (brewery closed)
- Headquarters: Sheffield, England
- Area served: North of England
- Products: Beer
- Production output: Brewery: 50,000 hectolitres (1992).Stones Bitter: 1.4 million hl across multiple breweries (1992); 100,000 hl (2012)
- Owner: Molson Coors UK
- Number of employees: 57
- Parent: Molson Coors

Stones Brewery (William Stones Ltd) was a brewery founded in 1868 by William Stones in Sheffield, Yorkshire, England, and purchased by Bass Brewery in 1968. After its closure in 1999, Stones Bitter has continued to be produced by Molson Coors.

William Stones started brewing in 1847 in Sheffield with Joseph Watts. Following Watts' death in 1854, he continued brewing by himself. In 1868, he purchased the lease of the Neepsend Brewery and renamed it the Cannon Brewery. He continued to brew there until his death in 1894. Stones' success saw him die as one of the richest men in Sheffield, although he lived a modest life. The company was taken over by Bass in 1968. In 2000, Bass sold its brewing operations to the Belgian brewer Interbrew who were ordered by the Competition Commission to sell Stones. In 2002, it was purchased by the Coors Brewing Company, who merged to become Molson Coors in 2005.

Stones Bitter was brewed at the Cannon Brewery from 1948 and was popular with Sheffield's steel workers. It was originally available across the south Yorkshire, Derbyshire and Nottinghamshire, with distribution extended to the rest of the north of England in 1977, and nationwide from 1979, accompanied by a considerable marketing push. Increasing demand saw it also brewed at other Bass breweries from the 1970s onwards. The beer's popularity reached its apex in 1992 when it was the country's highest selling bitter, selling over a million barrels. The beer has been lauded as "one of Sheffield's most famous exports". After the Cannon's closure production was continued elsewhere. Stones Bitter (3.7 per cent alcohol by volume) is brewed by Molson Coors at their brewery in Tadcaster, North Yorkshire, and the canned product at their Burton upon Trent brewery.

Stones sponsored the Rugby Football League Championship and its successor the Rugby Super League from 1986 until 1997. A series of television advertisements from 1983 until 1991, starring Tony Barton and Michael Angelis, became the longest running bitter advertisements in the country. Since the withdrawal of the majority of marketing support by Bass in 1997 in favour of Worthington, the beer has experienced a marked decline in sales volumes, although it remains among the twenty highest selling ales in the United Kingdom.

== History ==
=== Origins (1847–1900) ===
In 1847, Joseph Watts of Dewsbury and William Stones (1827 -1894) of Sheffield began brewing together at the Cannon Brewery in Sheffield's Shalesmoor district near Kelham Island. The name may have come from the nearby foundry that cast gun barrels. In 1852 they acquired their first tied house, the Kelham Tavern. Watts died in May 1854 aged 46, and two years later Stones purchased his share of the business from his former partner's brother. By 1861 the brewery employed 23 men and two boys. In 1868, Stones took over the lease of the Shepherd, Green & Hatfield brewery in the Neepsend district, which had been founded as the Neepsend Brewery in 1838. He renamed it the Cannon Brewery after his original premises. In 1880 Stones built two malthouses in Worksop. Stones died in 1894, and he left the brewery to his cashier, James Haynes, and Richard Wigfull, a corn miller, as tenants in common. William Stones became a limited company in 1895 with £275,000 of capital (£31,263,128 in 2025 adjusted for inflation) and had by this time grown to become one of the largest businesses in Sheffield, with a tied estate of 84 pubs primarily in its home city and Chesterfield. Distribution was extended to Huddersfield in 1896.

=== Consolidation (1901–1966) ===
Stones acquired the fourteen tied houses of Chambers' Brunswick Brewery in Sheffield, after that company entered into liquidation in 1910, for £28,200 in 1911. In 1919, The Crown Inn opposite the Cannon Brewery was purchased and rebuilt to serve as the brewery tap. By 1939 the brewery estate had expanded to include Mansfield and Barnsley.

In 1954, William Stones partnered with Tennant Brothers to acquire the Sheffield Free Brewery, closing the brewery and dividing the estate between themselves. In the same year, the company purchased Mappin's Brewery of Rotherham, and the brewery was closed down the following year. The takeover added around 100 public houses to their tied estate, to make a total of 300. As a result, Stones had the second largest tied estate in Sheffield after Tennant's.

In 1959, William Stones paid £100,000 (£2,022,946 in 2025 adjusted for inflation) for Ward & Sons of Swinton, a family-run local bottler of beer and mineral water. The Ward bottling plant was capable of filling and labelling 8,000 bottles an hour, which was more productive than Stones' existing plant. The acquisition allowed Stones to bottle national beers such as Bass and Guinness for itself, rather than relying on contractors. Also in that year a reciprocal deal was reached with Whitbread, whereby William Stones supplied draught bitter to the 33 houses of the former Scarsdale Brewing Company of Chesterfield, in return for stocking Whitbread's Mackeson Stout in their own tied estate. In 1960, the company was awarded the rights to bottle the Norwegian Ringnes lager brand for the region. All bottling had transferred to Swinton by 1961, allowing Stones to close its own bottling plant, giving it room to redevelop its Sheffield site. In 1962, a deal was reached with United Breweries to sell Carling Black Label lager in Stones tied houses in exchange for supplying Stones products to United's Sheffield area public houses. In 1965 the company was valued at £5 million, rising to £7.2 million by 1967 (£114,725,752 in 2025 adjusted for inflation) as takeover rumours mounted. In 1966, William Stones launched its first brewery conditioned beer, Stones Imperial.

=== Multinational ownership (1967–1999) ===
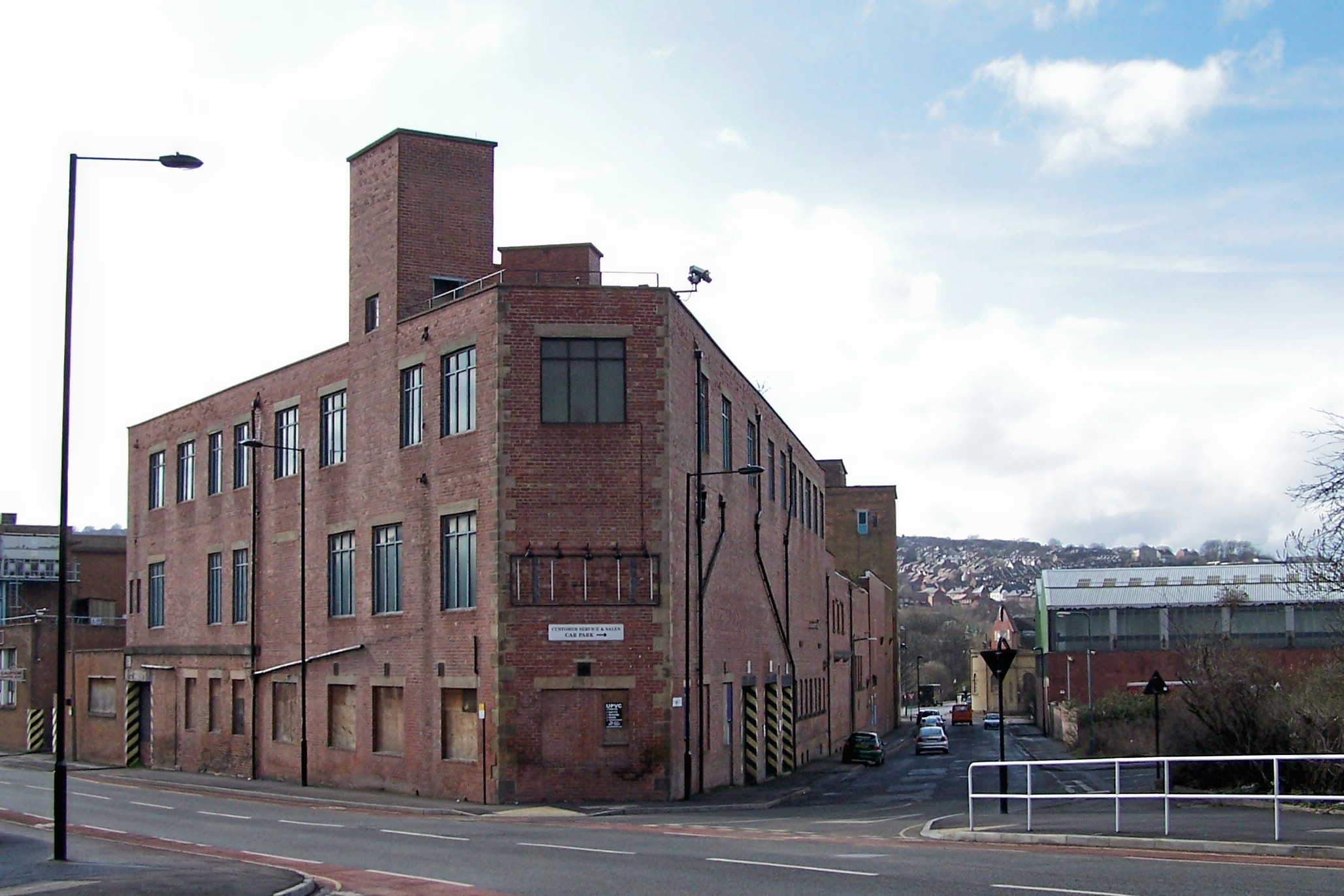
The Cannon Brewery was rebuilt in 1962.

By 1967 Bass had built up a 14 per cent stake in the company, and in 1968 they purchased William Stones for £9 million (£137,641,968 in 2025 adjusted for inflation) The friendly takeover was financed by an exchange of stock. The company had a tied estate of 257 public houses and 70 off-licences, located mainly in the south of Yorkshire, Nottinghamshire and Derbyshire, as well as a substantial free trade business. Bass retained production of the popular Stones Bitter, but largely replaced the remaining 20 per cent of Stones' sales with its own nationally available brands, such as Worthington E, and Stones' cider supplier was switched from H. P. Bulmer to Bass' own Taunton mill. As a Bass subsidiary, William Stones was given a fair amount of autonomy. The takeover also saw the Swinton bottling plant and the brewery's Worksop maltings closed down. In 1970 Bass suggested that the Cannon Brewery might be shut down, but the continuing popularity of Stones Bitter as well as technical and industrial relations problems at the supposed replacement Runcorn plant in Cheshire ensured the brewery's survival. With Bass' national distribution network, Stones Bitter began to be sold across the entire United Kingdom from 1979, and was intended as a mass-produced equivalent to Bass's regional ales.

By 1982 16 per cent of Yorkshire's public houses were tied to Stones. Bass closed the Cannon Brewery in April 1999 with the loss of 57 jobs. Bass blamed the closure on the steep decline in sales of cask conditioned beers (nationally there had been a 14 per cent decline in sales of cask beer over the previous 12 months) which the brewery produced. The brewer realised £1 million in efficiency savings by closing the brewery. The Campaign for Real Ale blamed the brewery's closure on Bass' failure to promote their cask conditioned products. As well as Stones Bitter, the Cannon brewed the small scale Bass Special, Bass Light and Bass Mild brands from the mid-1990s as declining Stones volumes left the brewery with spare capacity. Bass Light and Bass Mild had been sold in the Sheffield area as Stones Mild and Stones Dark Mild respectively.

Bass moved production of Stones to its Burton upon Trent and Tadcaster breweries. In 2000, Bass sold its brewing interests, including their breweries and the Stones brand to the Belgian brewer Interbrew. Interbrew contracted the production of cask conditioned Stones to Marston's in Burton. Competition concerns forced Interbrew to sell off certain brands in December 2001, including Stones Bitter, which was bought by the American Coors Brewing Company (later Molson Coors). Molson Coors currently produce keg Stones Bitter at their brewery in Tadcaster, and the canned version at their Burton brewery. The cask product was initially contract brewed at the Highgate Brewery in Walsall, West Midlands, before moving to Everards of Leicester in 2005. The cask product ceased production in June 2012.

Stones Bitter has suffered a decline in sales since the closure, and a member of the Bass board of directors that took the decision to close the brewery has admitted that, given the subsequent resurgence in golden ales and local provenance in beer, the decision to close the brewery was the wrong one. Retrospectively, he argues that Bass should have backed Stones over Worthington.

== William Stones ==
William Stones was born in Sheffield on 29 December 1826. His parents were Eliza and Joseph, both cabinet case makers. By 1870 Stones was living in Sheffield's Lowfield area. Stones purchased a "spacious" terraced house in 1883, although he had been renting the property for several years prior to this. Stones died aged 68 on 14 November 1894, having devoted his whole life to brewing. He died as one of the richest men in Sheffield, leaving over £150,000 in his will (£16,856,608 in 2025 adjusted for inflation). A bachelor, he left his wealth to his sister, friends and various charitable concerns. Stones is said to have earned his success through clever marketing and a consistently good product.

== Cannon Brewery ==
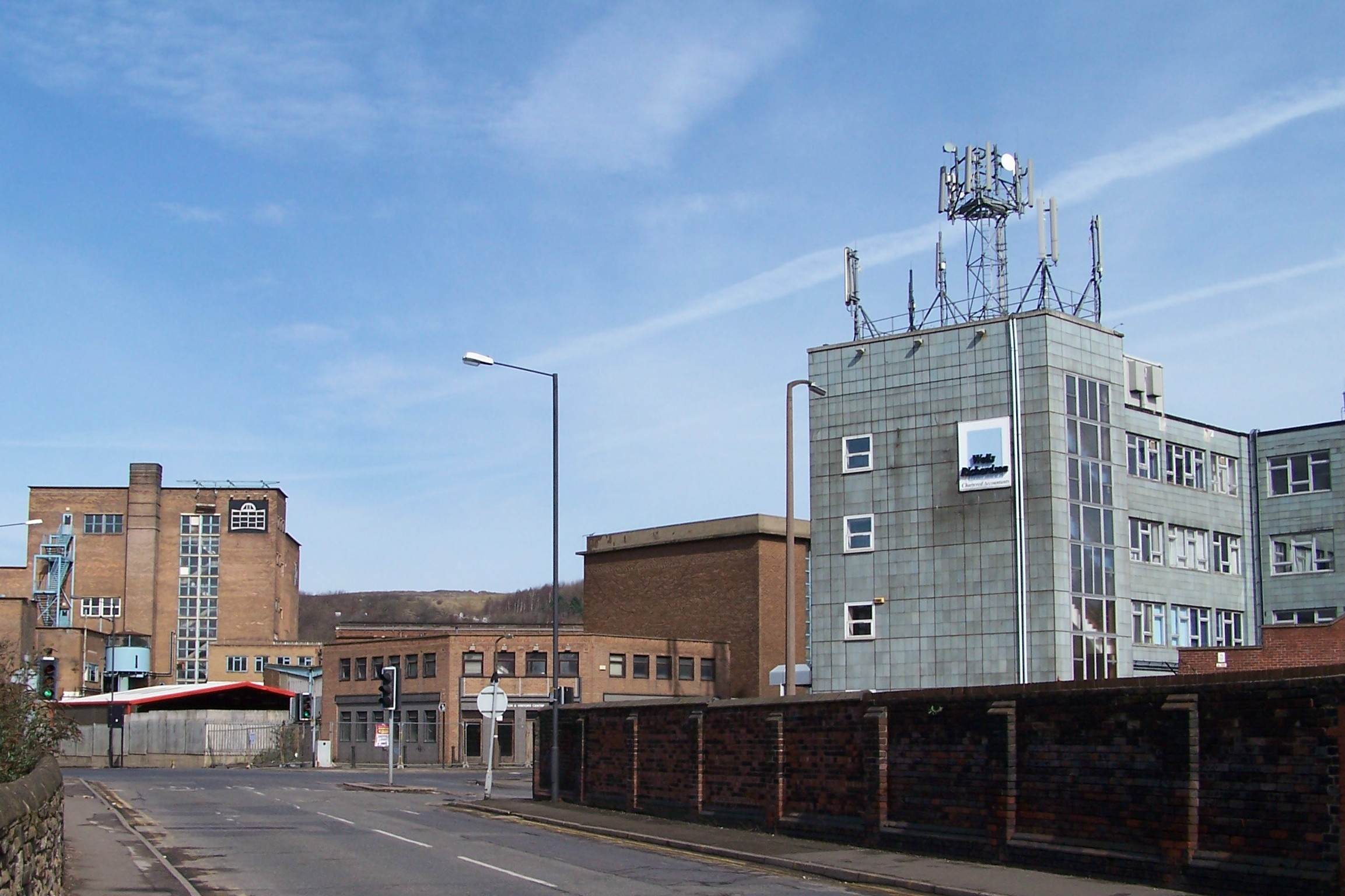
The former office building is in the foreground.

Situated in Neepsend, Shepherd, Green & Hatfield were the first to brew at the site in 1838 at what was then a respectable residential district. By 1895 the brewery was equipped with "an expensive plant...excellent stores and cellars, spacious covered and open yards, offices, stabling [and] workshops." The marketing and sales offices on the brewery site were completed in 1958. A new £500,000 five-storey brewhouse was operational by 1962, and was one of the most up to date in the country. An on-site public house was opened in the basement of the brewery in 1964, initially named The Underground, but later renamed The Pig and Whistle; it was used by brewery workers and visitors. At its peak the brewery produced 50,000 hectolitres of cask conditioned Stones each year. The office building was sold off in 1985. In 1992 a visitor's centre building was opened. In 1995, the brewery was used as a shooting location for the film When Saturday Comes. The office building is occupied by an accountancy firm, however the remainder of the site is currently unoccupied and derelict.

== Beers ==
=== Stones Bitter ===
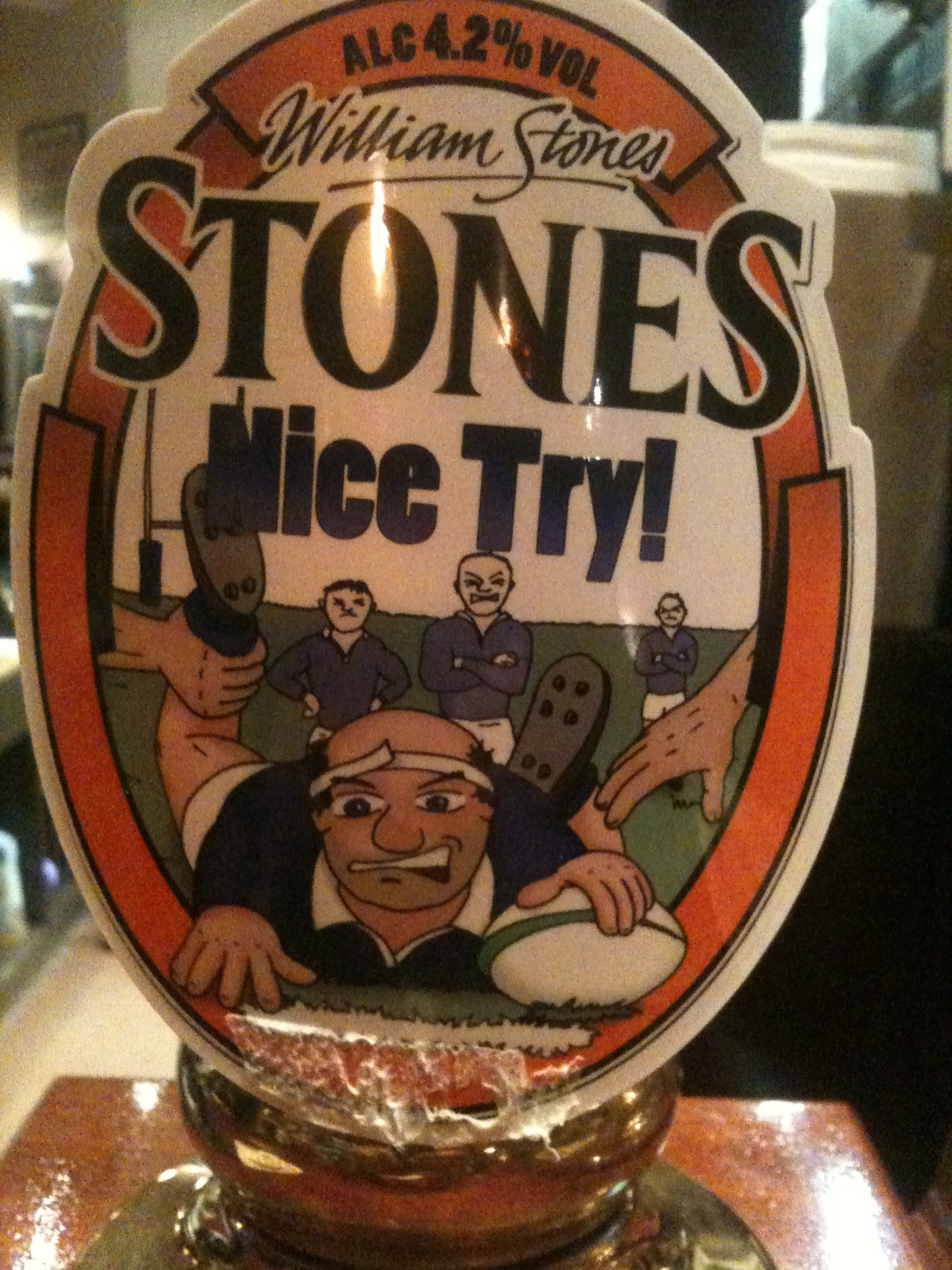
Pump clip for Nice Try, a seasonal special using the Stones brand name.

Stones Bitter is a bitter beer first brewed in 1948 at the Cannon Brewery. It was designed for the steelworkers of Sheffield's Lower Don Valley. Bass extended its distribution to include the north of England in 1977, before extending distribution nationwide in 1979. Its popularity during the 1970s and 1980s in its heartland saw it described as "more of a religion than a beer." By 1992 Stones was the UK's highest selling bitter, with a million barrels sold annually. That same year the ABV of Stones was reduced from 4.1 per cent to 3.9 per cent ABV, and then to 3.7 per cent in 1999. The cask conditioned Stones was restored to 4.1 per cent ABV in 2006, before being discontinued in 2012. A famous major television campaign ran nationally from 1983 until 1991 with the tagline "(Wherever you may wander) there's no taste like Stones" and starred Tony Barton and Michael Angelis. By 1987 it had become the UK's longest running bitter campaign of all time. Stones also sponsored the Rugby Football League Championship from 1986 to 1995 and its successor the Rugby Super League from 1996 to 1997.

=== Other beers ===
As with many breweries, occasional special brews were commissioned upon commemorative dates and retirement of long-serving employees. In 1991 a special bottled beer was produced when Sheffield Wednesday reached the finals of the Football League Cup. Two thousand bottles of Stones Centenary Ale were produced in 1995, celebrating 100 years of rugby league. This was followed by the 1996 cask conditioned Stones Super League Bitter (4.8 per cent ABV) celebrating Stones' sponsorship of the League, and the 1998 bottled Stones Commemorative Ale which marked the scheduled closure of the brewery. In summer 2007, Everards brewed a one-off cask conditioned Stones Pure Gold (4.1 per cent ABV) golden ale, and in 2011 four cask conditioned sports themed Stones branded ales were made available throughout the first half of the year, brewed at William Worthington's Brewery in Burton upon Trent.
