= Stones Bitter =

Beer manufactured by Molson Coors

- Type: Beer
- Manufacturer: Molson Coors
- Distributor: Molson Coors
- Origin: Sheffield, England
- Introduced: 1948
- Alcohol by volume: 3.7%
- Colour: straw/golden

Stones Bitter is a beer manufactured and distributed in the United Kingdom by the North American brewer Molson Coors. It is a bitter with a straw-golden hue. Stones Bitter was first brewed in 1948 by William Stones Ltd at the Cannon Brewery in Sheffield. It was designed for the local steelworkers and became successful in its local area, becoming one of Sheffield's best known products.

Bass Charrington acquired William Stones in 1968, and began to heavily promote the keg variant of Stones Bitter, which eventually became the highest selling bitter in the country. In the 1990s the ABV of Stones was gradually reduced, and, as ale sales declined, Stones reverted from a national into a regional brand. Following the closure of the Cannon Brewery, Stones has been brewed at a number of different breweries. When Bass exited its brewing business, Stones became a Coors brand (later Molson Coors).

Stones was promoted through a series of television advertisements in the 1980s that starred Michael Angelis and Tony Barton. It eventually became the United Kingdom's longest ever running bitter campaign. Stones sponsored the Rugby Football League Championship and its successor the Rugby Super League throughout the 1980s and 1990s.

== History ==
The head brewer Edward "Ted" Collins first produced Stones Bitter at the Cannon Brewery in 1948. It was designed for the steelworkers of Sheffield's Lower Don Valley. The product was formulated as the working classes began to favour bitter over the dark mild style of beer. The beer's straw colour made it reasonably unusual for the time, and its individuality helped it to become an immediate success. By the 1960s its local reputation was "colossal", and it accounted for 80 per cent of William Stones' sales. Stones had such a strong local following that it was described as being "more of a religion than a beer."

From 1979, keg Stones began to be promoted heavily nationwide, and the beer was introduced to the South of England for the first time. The beer was promoted following the withdrawal of the unpopular Brew Ten, which was itself intended to replace Bass's regional ales. Originally the beer would be produced at the Cannon Brewery and then transported to Bass' Hope & Anchor brewery, also in Sheffield, for pasteurisation and kegging, but eventually demand for Stones Bitter became too great for the Cannon alone, and production was also extended to other Bass breweries. In the early 1980s Stones Bitter was produced at Bass' Runcorn brewery, although this ceased after drinkers complained of headaches from the poorly manufactured beer. The Runcorn beer had been brewed at a higher temperature, which increased the amount of hangover-inducing fusel oils in the beer.

Stones Bitter became the highest selling beer for Bass Breweries from 1981, when it overtook Worthington E in sales. Stones was the ninth most popular beer in the United Kingdom in 1989, with two per cent of all beer sales. Demand was such that the Cannon Brewery was paying up to £1.5 million per month in duty by 1991. Cask conditioned Stones won silver in the Bitter category in the CAMRA Champion Beer of Britain in 1991. Stones was the highest selling bitter in the UK by 1992, a million barrel a year brand, described by Bass as "a tremendously important brand with untapped potential". That same year, Bass were criticised for reducing the ABV of Stones from 4.1 per cent to 3.9 per cent ABV in order to reduce the impact of beer duty. The current packaging was introduced in 1994, and evokes Vulcan, the Roman god of fire and blacksmiths, and protector of craftsmen.

In 1997, the Yorkshire Post described the beer as "one of Sheffield's most famous exports", and "a name which carries as much pride as the Made in Sheffield stamp." In 1997, Bass decided to deprioritise Stones in order to concentrate on promoting Worthington as their national ale brand. Stones' ABV was further reduced to 3.8 per cent in August 1998, and then to 3.7 per cent a few months later leading to its derision in the Yorkshire Evening Post. Following the closure of the Cannon Brewery in 1999, canned Stones has been brewed in Burton upon Trent and keg Stones in Tadcaster.

The cask conditioned variant was brewed by Highgate Brewery of Walsall, Thwaites Brewery of Blackburn and finally Everards of Leicester. It was restored to 4.1 per cent ABV and its original recipe in August 2006, with Coors claiming that it would be "like [how] Stones used to taste." The product was discontinued in 2011.

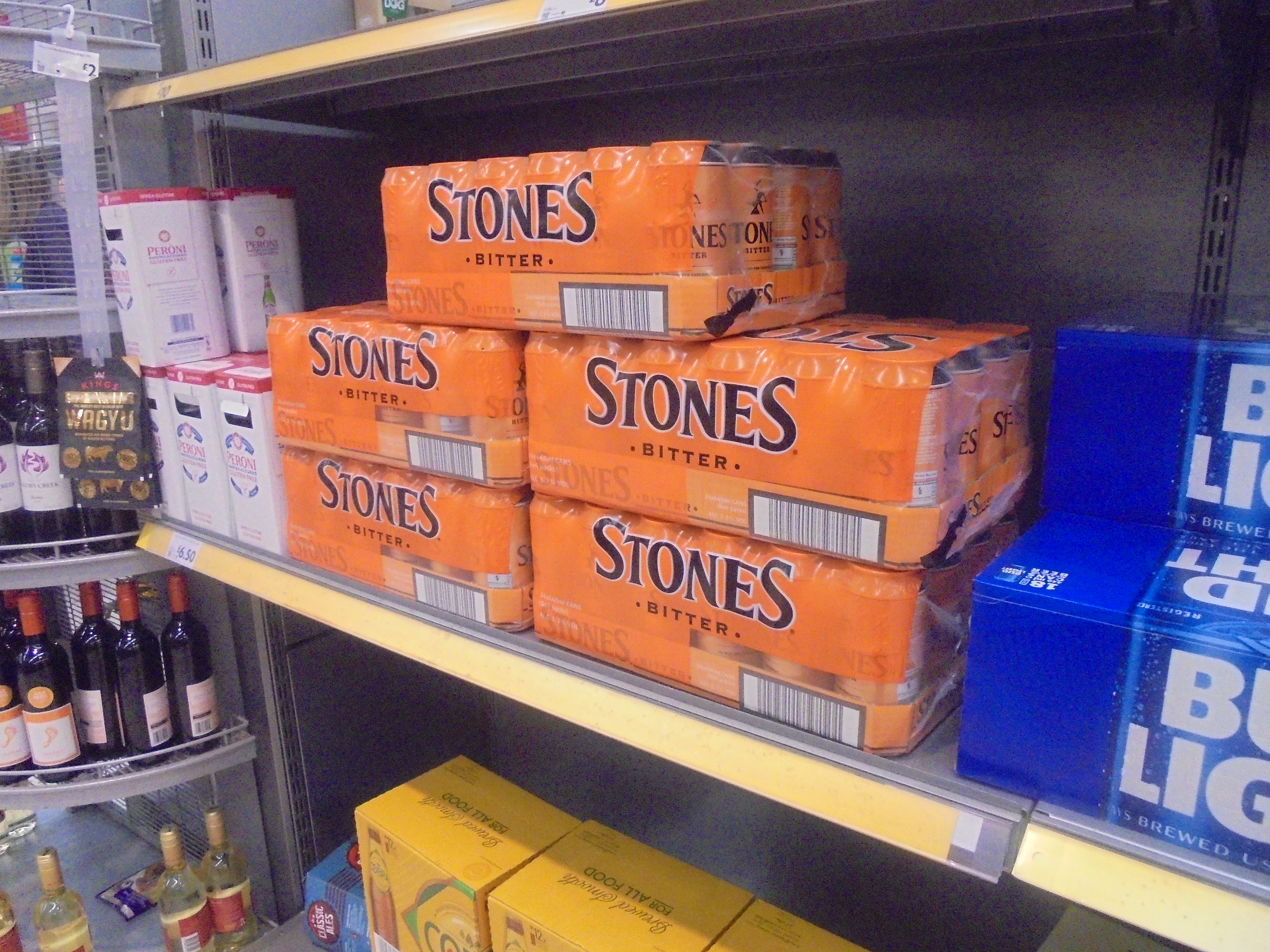
Stones Bitter on sale in Morrisons, Wetherby, West Yorkshire.

In 2006, Off Licence News identified the canned variant as "continuing a slow but sure decline that has seen its status redefined from national brand to Yorkshire regional over the last decade." As of 2012, Stones Bitter is among the twenty highest selling ales in the United Kingdom, with estimated annual volumes at over 100,000 hectolitres.

Cask conditioned Stones Bitter returned in 2021, brewed under licence by Sheffield brewer TrueNorth.

== Recipe and flavour ==
The recipes for brewery conditioned and cask conditioned Stones differ:

Brewery conditioned Stones is brewed with a blend of hops from America (Columbus and Zeus) and Europe (Magnum and Admiral). The barley variety used is Pearl. The beer comes in kegs and 440ml cans, and is described as having a "fragrant grapefruit-citrus hop aroma, [which] cuts through a characteristically sulphury background with a fruity edge. The unusual salts balance ensures that the bitterness isn’t dry."

Cask conditioned Stones uses Challenger hops, and is dry hopped with English Goldings. It is described as having an aroma of hops, sulphur and grapefruit, with a salty, moreish and zesty taste.

== Advertising ==
A major television campaign ran nationally from 1983 until 1991 with the tagline (coined by playwright Peter Whelan): "(Wherever you may wander) there's no taste like Stones". The series initially starred Bernard Hill and Tony Barton, although Hill was replaced by Michael Angelis from 1984 onwards. The advertisements followed the characters of Jeff and Dave as they got into scrapes in various overseas locations, with humorous results. By 1987 it had become the UK's longest running bitter campaign of all time.

From 1993 Stones was only advertised in the north of England. The 1994-96 "Sheffield Gold" campaign was set in a steel foundry: a nod to the city's heritage, although it was filmed in the Czech Republic because Sheffield's own foundries were considered to be too clean and automated for the desired gritty and industrial effect. A spokesman for Bass explained: "We wanted sparks and goggles." It was to be the final major marketing push for Stones, and as of 2012 the only marketing support for the brand is the provision of Stones branded glassware and bar merchandise for regular stockists.

=== Sponsorships ===
Stones Bitter sponsored the Rugby Football League Championship from 1986 to 1995, and then its successor the Rugby Super League from 1996 to 1997. A 1986–8 set of poster advertisements with the tagline "Stones, sheer poetry" supported the sponsorship. In 1995 and 1996, Stones sponsored the Doncaster Handicap and the Park Hill Stakes horse racing events. Stones Bitter are also sponsors of the Sheffield Steelers, they have a sponsor on the bottom of their jersey.

It also sponsored midlands sports show Central Sports Special.
