= William Eadie (cricketer) =

English cricketer

Personal information
- Full name: William Stewart Eadie
- Born: 27 November 1864; Burton-on-Trent, England
- Died: 20 September 1914 (aged 49); Barrow-upon-Trent, England
- Batting: Right-handed
- Relatives: James Eadie (father); John Eadie (brother); Kenneth Dobson (nephew)

Domestic team information
- Years: Team
- 1885–1899: Derbyshire
- FC debut: 4 June 1885 Derbyshire v Lancashire
- Last FC: 22 May 1899 Derbyshire v Hampshire

Career statistics
Competition	First-class
Matches	23
Runs scored	399
Batting average	10.50
100s/50s	0/1
Top score	62
Balls bowled	8
Wickets	0
Bowling average	–
5 wickets in innings	–
10 wickets in match	–
Best bowling	–
Catches/stumpings	7/–
- Source: CricketArchive, 30 August 2011

William Stewart Eadie (27 November 1864 – 20 September 1914) was an English cricketer who played for Derbyshire between 1885 and 1899.

== Early years ==
Eadie was born in Burton-on-Trent Staffordshire, the son of James Eadie and his wife Jean. His father, who was from Scotland, had established the James Eadie brewery company at Burton in 1854.

== Career ==
Eadie made his debut for Derbyshire in the 1885 season. For the years 1887 to 1893 Eadie played over 30 matches for the club while it was without first-class status. He then played first-class again intermittently until the 1899 season. He was a right arm batsman who played 41 innings in 23 first-class matches for Derbyshire, with a top score of 62 and an average of 10.5.

== Death ==
Eadie died at Barrow upon Trent at the age of 49.

== Family ==
His brother, John Eadie and nephew Kenneth Dobson both played first-class cricket for Derbyshire.

== See also ==
- Brewers of Burton
