= Kenneth Dobson =

English cricketer

Personal information
- Full name: Kenneth William Cecil Dobson
- Born: 28 August 1900; Barrow upon Trent, Derbyshire, England
- Died: 6 March 1960 (aged 59); Torquay, England
- Batting: Right-handed
- Bowling: Right-arm medium pace
- Role: Bowler / Tailend batsman

Domestic team information
- Years: Team
- 1920: Derbyshire
- 1923: Staffordshire
- 1925: Warwickshire

Kenneth William Cecil Dobson (28 August 1900 – 6 March 1960) was an English cricketer. He was a right-handed batsman and a right-arm medium-pace bowler who played for Derbyshire and Warwickshire.

Dobson was born in Barrow upon Trent, Derbyshire, the son of Frederick William Dobson and his wife Agnes Eadie. He played three County Cricket matches for Derbyshire in May 1920. In the first game against Yorkshire, he was stumped for a duck in his first innings and bowled by two-time Test cricketer Abe Waddington in the second. In 1923 he played a minor counties game for Staffordshire. Finally he played two games in the 1925 season, for Warwickshire. Dobson was a tailend batsman and an occasional bowler.

Dobson died in Torquay aged 59. His uncles John Eadie and William Eadie also represented Derbyshire in County Cricket.
