= James Eadie (brewer) =

Scottish brewer (1827–1904)

James Eadie (1827–1904) was a Scottish brewer who founded an eponymous brewery in Burton on Trent which operated for 90 years.

Eadie was born at Blackford, Perthshire one of the 14 children of William Eadie and his wife Mary Stewart and was baptised on 12 Jan 1827. His father had founded a small brewhouse at Blackford in the early 19th century as part of a posting hotel with livery stables on Moray Street. In 1842 Eadie moved to Fazeley. Staffordshire where his brother John (1811-1883) was a tea dealer. He began a business supplying malt to brewers around Fazeley and extended the business to cover Burton on Trent. In 1854 Eadie established a brewery in Cross Street Burton. By 1891 Eadie was living at Barrow Hall, Barrow-upon-Trent. He also acquired an estate in Scotland at Glenrinnes, Banffshire He became Deputy Lieutenant of Banffshire on 24 May 1900 and in 1902 erected a monument near Favillar, Moray in commemoration of the coronation of King Edward VII.

Eadie's sons, John Eadie and William Eadie, both played cricket for Derbyshire.

== James Eadie brewing company ==
The James Eadie company grew successfully from its establishment in 1854 and continued as a private concern until it was registered in 1893. The Cross Street brewery was visited by Alfred Barnard and written up in his book Noted breweries of Great Britain and Ireland, Volume 2, 1889. Barnard also reveals how Mr James Eadie had inherited, from his father, a recipe for a Scotch Whisky Blend which he describes as 'an ancient Scotch mixture' that was dispensed to a favoured few. However like other Burton breweries at the time, the company ran into financial difficulties and had to be restructured in 1896. The company, with its brewery and several hundred public houses was acquired by Bass Ratcliffe and Gretton in 1933.

Scotch whisky has been bottled under the name "James Eadie" since 2015.

== See also ==
- Brewers of Burton
