= John Eadie (cricketer) =

English cricketer and brewer

Personal information
- Full name: John Thom Clarke Eadie
- Born: 25 September 1861; Burton on Trent, Staffordshire, England
- Died: 19 August 1923 (aged 61); Lichfield, England
- Relatives: James Eadie (father); William Eadie; Kenneth Dobson (nephew)

Domestic team information
- Years: Team
- 1882: Derbyshire
- Only FC: 25 May 1882 Derbyshire v Lancashire

Career statistics
Competition	First-class
Matches	1
Runs scored	8
Batting average	8.00
100s/50s	0/0
Top score	8
Balls bowled	12
Wickets	1
Bowling average	6.00
5 wickets in innings	0
10 wickets in match	0
Best bowling	1/6
Catches/stumpings	0/–
- Source: CricketArchive, 23 June 2011

John Thom Clarke Eadie (25 September 1861 – 19 August 1923) was an English brewer and cricketer who played for Derbyshire in 1882.

Eadie was born in Burton-on-Trent Staffordshire, the son of James Eadie and his wife Jean. His father, who was from Scotland, had established the James Eadie brewery company at Burton in 1854. In 1881 Eadie was a clerk in his father's brewery.

Eadie appeared in one match for Derbyshire during the 1882 season, against Lancashire. He finished not out in the first innings but was out for a duck in the second, bowling economically and taking one wicket during the match.

Eadie died at Lichfield at the age of 62.

Eadie's brother, William Eadie and nephew Kenneth Dobson both played first-class cricket for Derbyshire.

== See also ==
- Brewers of Burton
