= The Bass Excursions =

1904 excursionists' brochure

The Bass Excursions were a series of works outings laid on for the entire workforce of the Burton-on-Trent brewing firm of Bass, Ratcliff & Gretton. They took place every summer, and ran from the 1860s until 1914. The last one, to Scarborough, took place just weeks before the outbreak of the First World War. The excursions, which were originally just for workers, quickly expanded to include wives and children, along with managers and suppliers. So many townspeople were included that, on the day, the town's population of 50,000 was reduced by nearly a fifth. Workers travelled free – with family members at a greatly reduced rate – and were given their day's wages, plus extra pocket money of a half crown to a guinea, depending on their status. Once there, production of their excursion ticket allowed free entrance to all the resort's attractions.

== Organisation ==
Up to seventeen special trains were engaged to take between 7,000–10,000 workers and their families. There were departures every ten to fifteen minutes, with some workers having arrived at their destination while others were still waiting at Burton station to board their allotted train. The 1904 excursion to Liverpool, for instance, consisted of seventeen trains, the first leaving at 4 a.m., the last at 6.50 a.m. By that time those on the 4 a.m. departure had already arrived at Liverpool Central. The last of the departures – composed entirely of first class dining saloons – was reserved for company executives, along with friends and guests.

The Trips
Year	Destination	Trains	Notes
1877	Liverpool		
1880			
1881	Scarborough	6	London visit cancelled due to smallpox epidemic
1882			
1883			
1884	Wolverhampton		
1885	Blackpool	8	
1886			
1887			
1888	Brighton		
1889	Blackpool		
1890	Scarborough		
1891	Liverpool & New Brighton	13	
1892	Blackpool	15	
1893	Great Yarmouth		
1894	Scarborough	15	
1895	Liverpool & New Brighton		
1896	Blackpool	16	
1897	Great Yarmouth	15	
1898	Scarborough		
1899	Liverpool & New Brighton	16	
1900	Blackpool	17	
1901	Great Yarmouth		
1902	Scarborough		
1903	Blackpool	17	
1904	Liverpool & New Brighton	17	
1905	Great Yarmouth		
1906	Scarborough		
1907	Blackpool	17	
1908	Liverpool & New Brighton		
1909	Great Yarmouth		
1910	Scarborough		
1911	Blackpool	15	
1912	Liverpool & New Brighton		
1913	Great Yarmouth		
1914	Scarborough		

== Brochures ==
All excursionists were give an illustrated brochure, some containing up to 96 pages. The contents detailed the attractions of their destination, advice on places to eat (and nannyish reminders about the wisdom of a proper meal) . Discounts were available for the excursionists on presentation of their tickets. Additional outings and cruises were available. In addition there was lots of 'trivia' – a typical excursion could involve up to 250 carriages, for which two miles of sidings would be required at the destination town. There were facts and figures about rolling stock and locomotives, remarks about the stations and sights passed en route.

The brochures also served as a guide on travel etiquette, reminding passengers to travel only on their designated train, to ensure that compartments were fully utilised and not 'hogged'. In 3rd class this meant eight to ten in each compartment. Passengers were reminded not to throw bottles out of the window or to leave orange peel on the platforms.

When all trains had arrived safely at their destination, Bass's Traffic Manager, William Walters, personally sent a telegram to Burton-on-Trent to confirm it.

Facsimiles of the brochure for the 1904 trip to Liverpool and New Brighton are widely available secondhand. That for the 1914 Scarborough excursion is available new as a reprint. Both give an insight into Walter's gift for organisation and the remarkable logistical complexity of the excursions.

== Culture ==
Many people, both excursionists and those at their destination, good-humouredly referred to the invasion as 'Bass buying the town.' 'And the town is glad to be bought by such generous people,' said one Yarmouth businessman. 'Hundreds of them will stay for the week and are amongst our most welcome visitors.'

== Incidents and accidents ==
In 1901 a young maltster employed by Bass was found dead near the tracks just outside Melton Mowbray. After hearing from fellow passengers on the Yarmouth train, an inquest jury agreed that the man's injuries had been consistent with falling from a train, but could not decide whether it had been an accident or something more sinister.

Three years earlier, during the Scarborough trip of 1898, a Bass worker was drowned in a freak accident.

== Post-1914 ==
The 1915 excursion to Blackpool had to be cancelled. The demands of the war and mobilisation of troops meant that the railway companies were simply unable to handle a non-priority operation requiring the use of twenty trains. The workers were still allowed their holiday and mostly stayed at home in Burton-on-Trent.

== William Walters ==
The man responsible for the Bass excursions retired at the end of 1915 – aged 74. He had overseen the annual trips ever since the first one in 1865, which he organised at the personal behest of William Bass. The first trip – to Liverpool – had been for men and boys only, families not being allowed to go until a later date.
