= Burton Brewery Company =

Former British brewery

The Burton Brewery Company was one of the largest brewers in Burton upon Trent, England in the 19th century.

The company was founded in 1842 by Henry and Thomas Wilders, who came from a family of tanners. They built their brewery on their leather-working premises in Burton High Street. It grew remarkably quickly and was the third largest brewery in 1861 with 297 employees. The company also had maltings in Ashby-de-la-Zouch.

Along with many other breweries Burton Brewery Co. was in financial difficulties in 1907. Plans to combine with Thomas Salt and Co and Samuel Allsopp & Sons fell through and the company went into receivership. It was bought in 1915 by Worthington and Co, and Worthington brand beers continued to be brewed at the High Street brewery even after Worthington was taken over by Bass in 1927.

== See also ==
- Brewers of Burton
