= Worthington Brewery =

British brewery founded in 1761

- Industry: Brewing
- Founded: 1761; 265 years ago
- Founder: William Worthington
- Headquarters: Burton upon Trent, England
- Owner: Molson Coors

Worthington Brewery, also known as Worthington & Co. and Worthington's, is a British brewer founded by William Worthington in Burton upon Trent in 1761. It is the second oldest continuously-brewed British beer brand, after Whitbread. The principal product is Worthington Creamflow, a nitrokeg bitter.

When William Worthington died in 1800, his brewery was one of the largest outside London. Horace Tabberer Brown, a chemist employed by Worthington, pioneered brewing science in the separation and cultivation of pure yeast strains from 1866, and the brewery was the first in the world to systematically use a laboratory in the brewing process from 1872. Worthington & Co merged with its major Burton rival Bass in 1927. Until the 1960s the Worthington brand, in bottled form, ranked alongside Bass and Guinness as one of only three beers with nationwide distribution. However, bottled beer sales declined as keg beer grew in popularity throughout the 1960s, and the Worthington brewery closed in 1965. The beers continued to be brewed elsewhere.

The Worthington brand was purchased from Bass by the American brewing company Coors in 2002, which following a merger became Molson Coors in 2005. Creamflow is the third highest selling ale in the United Kingdom, and the highest selling ale in Wales. Worthington's White Shield IPA was brewed from 1829 until 2023. In 2010, Molson Coors opened the William Worthington microbrewery, which brews historical and seasonal beers.

The Worthington brand has had an association with rugby union sponsorship since the latter half of the twentieth century. The brand also sponsored the Football League Cup from 1998 until 2003.

== History ==
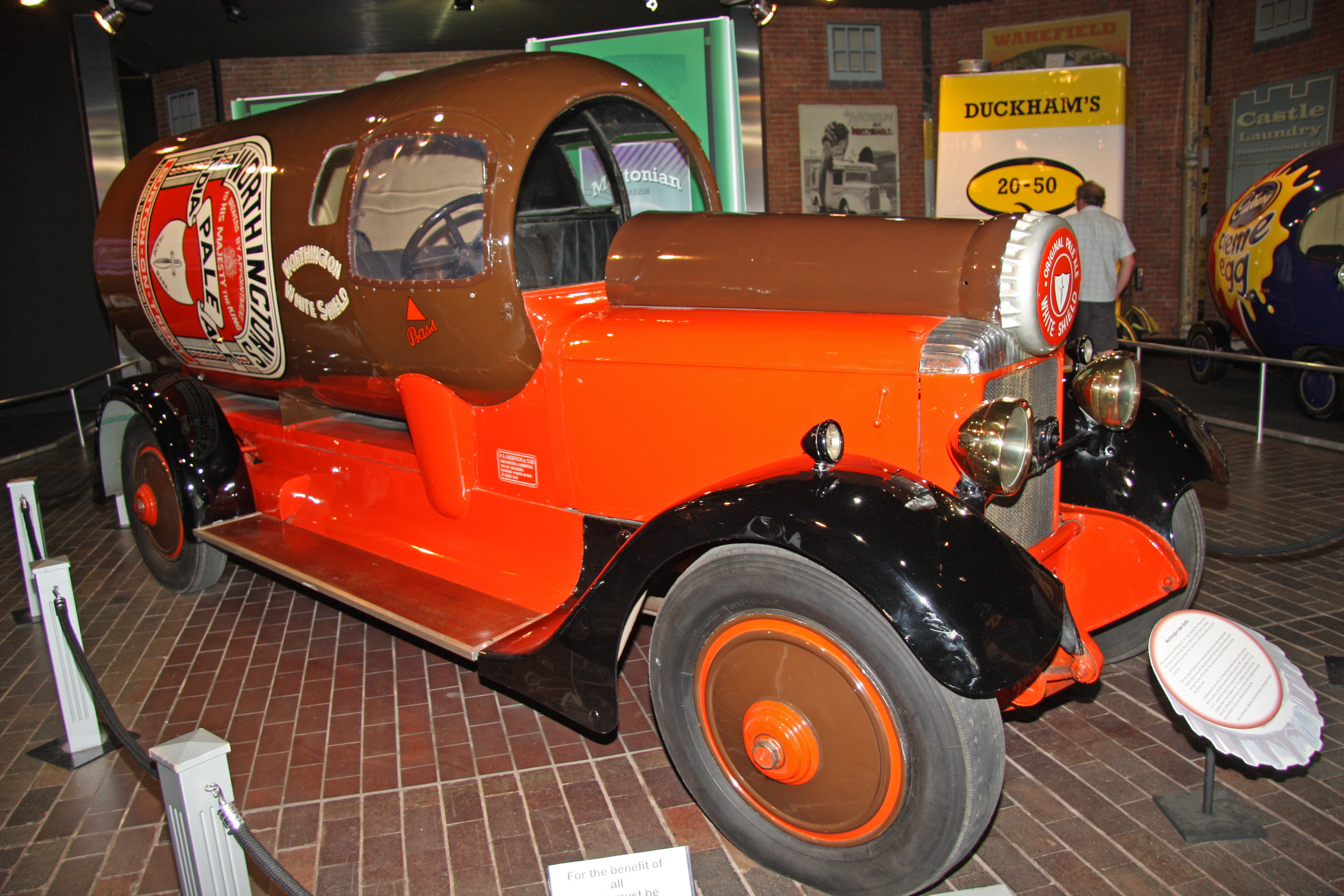
One of 5 of Worthington's Daimler beer bottle lorries used for promotional purposes during the 1920s

William Worthington (1723–1800) was born at Orton on the Hill in Leicestershire, the fourth child of William Worthington (1687–1742), yeoman farmer, and his wife, Elizabeth. In 1744, he moved to Burton upon Trent in Staffordshire where he worked as a cooper at Joseph Smith's brewery. In 1760, Worthington purchased the brewery from Smith's successor, Richard Commings, for £320 (equivalent to £60,000 as of 2025).

By the 1780s, the brewery probably had an annual output of around 1,500 barrels, similar to the rival breweries of Benjamin Wilson and Michael Bass. Throughout the eighteenth century, Worthington sales were mostly of porter, directed towards the Baltic market, which was transported via narrowboat through the River Trent to the Port of Hull. Largely as a result of this trade, by the time of Worthington's death in 1800, Worthington & Co. ranked among the largest of the provincial breweries.

Worthington's eldest son, also named William (1764–1825), assumed control of the company following his father's death. On the death of Worthington in 1825 he was succeeded by his son, also named William (1799–1871). A combination of factors conspired to make the Baltic trade infeasible; the Napoleonic Wars disrupted trade in the region and the Russian government increased import tariffs in 1822. Combined with a decrease on malt duty in 1823, this led to an oversupply of beer in Burton. As a result, the brewers instead looked towards the expatriate community in India as an increasingly important export market. Worthington produced their own India Pale Ale from 1829 onwards.

The railway network joined Burton in August 1839, which made it much more economical to distribute beer throughout the country. In 1842 William Worthington entered into partnership with Thomas Robinson, and the business traded as Worthington & Robinson. By 1861 Worthington employed 191 men and boys. Worthington dissolved the Robinson partnership in 1864, in order for his sons to acquire the business. The company became known as Worthington and Company, the co-partners being: William (1799–1871), with two of his sons, William Henry (1826–1894) and Calvert (1830–1871), who were joined two years later by his youngest son, Albert Octavius (1844–1918). After the introduction of agencies in British conurbations from the mid-1860s, the company began to rapidly expand.

In 1866 the Prince of Wales awarded the company the Royal Warrant. Worthington pioneered brewing science from 1866 by employing a chemist, Horace Tabberer Brown, who led the world in separation and cultivation of pure yeast strains. From 1872 the Worthington brewery was the first in the world to systematically use a laboratory in the brewing process. The company had previously resisted employing a laboratory, for fear that the public would perceive the scientific apparatus as a means of doctoring the beer. In order to differentiate themselves from other brewers, Worthington labelled their beers with alphabetical letters: their Burton Ales were called G, F and D, their light dinner ale was labelled M. Worthington E was an India Pale Ale, a competitor to Bass Pale Ale. By 1880, Worthington's IPA was challenging Bass's sales in the home market. Worthington was the third largest Burton brewer by 1888, behind Bass and Allsopp, with an annual output of 220,000 barrels per annum.

From 1886, Worthington began to acquire public houses, which provided a captive market for their product. In order to raise capital for this expansion, the firm became a public company in 1889, and Horace Brown was created joint managing director alongside William Posnette Manners (1846–1915). By this time the company had an annual output of around 200,000 barrels, and employed 470 people. By 1890, the company's bottling operations equalled those of Bass, Guinness, Allsopp and Whitbread. When William Henry Worthington (1826–1894) died he left no direct heirs and was the fourth and final generation of the family to manage Worthington & Co. Horace Brown left the company in 1894 following a dispute with co-manager William Manners. By 1900, 73 per cent of the company's equity was in the hands of William Posnette Manners, who had joined the company in 1862 as a junior clerk, and under his astute leadership Worthington acquired a reputation for the quality of its bottled pale ales. The company acquired the Burton Brewery Company in 1915.

William Manners died in 1915, and control of the company passed to two of his sons, Arthur Manners (1879–1968) and Ernest Manners. Arthur was the architect of the merger with archrival Bass in 1927, and proved to be more than a match for John Gretton, 1st Baron Gretton, the chairman of the much larger Bass. Despite Bass's superior capitalization, the terms of the merger were such that Manners became chairman and joint managing director of Worthington, and deputy chairman and joint managing director of Bass. The amalgamation, described as 'the biggest non-merger in the history of the brewing industry', failed to realize its objectives. Apart from greater co-operation in bottled beer production and distribution, there were few economies and the two companies continued to operate as separate entities. Both boards were increasingly dominated by Manners and his family.

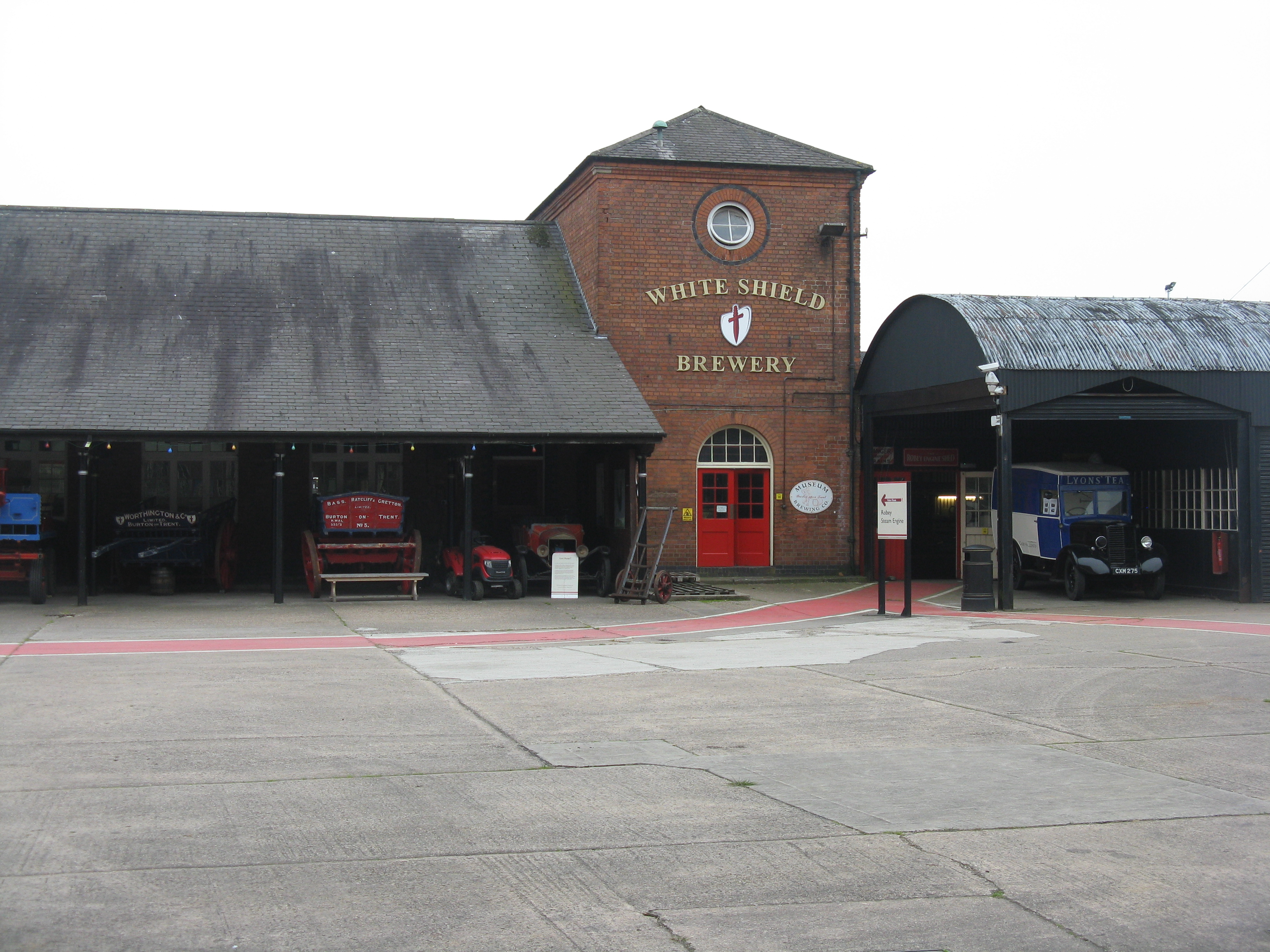
The White Shield Brewery

By the 1920s, in bottled form, Worthington was one of only three nationally distributed beer brands, alongside Bass and Guinness. Product rationalisation began after the Second World War and although Worthington occasionally overtook Bass in sales, the decision was taken to prioritise Bass products. Arthur Manners took the chairmanship of Bass in 1947, and was instrumental in driving the company forward. Brewing industry mergers from the late 1950s onwards damaged Worthington sales, as tied house ownership became increasingly concentrated with brewers intent on promoting their own products. At the same time, bottled beer sales suffered as drinkers in search of consistency opted for the new keg beers instead. In 1965, the original Worthington brewery was closed, although production of the Worthington beers continued, consisting of White Shield, Green Shield (a filtered version of White Shield) and the draught product, E. Worthington E became the main keg bitter offered by Bass from 1967, and it had become a leading bitter brand by the 1970s, boosted by the company's network of 11,000 public houses. Worthington E was replaced as Bass' leading keg bitter by Stones Bitter from 1981. Worthington regained its position as the leading ale brand for Bass from 1997, predominantly through the Creamflow variant.

In 2000, Bass was bought by the Belgian brewer Interbrew. The Competition Commission ordered Interbrew to divest itself of a number of its recently acquired brands, and Worthington was bought by the American brewer Coors, who later became Molson Coors in 2005. In 2004 Coors announced that they would no longer advertise Worthington on a large scale.

== Overview ==
Worthington's Creamflow (3.6% ABV) ale is the twelfth highest selling beer in the United Kingdom, with an estimated 640,000 hectolitres sold in 2012. It is the third highest selling ale brand in the United Kingdom after John Smith's and Tetley's. It is the highest selling ale in Wales, where it has a 20 per cent volume share, and has been first since at least 1999. Most of the sales consist of the nitrogenated and pasteurised Creamflow, which was launched in 1995 and is available in kegs and cans. Modest amounts of a four per cent ABV keg bitter known as Worthington's Ale continue to be brewed for the Teesside market.

== White Shield ==
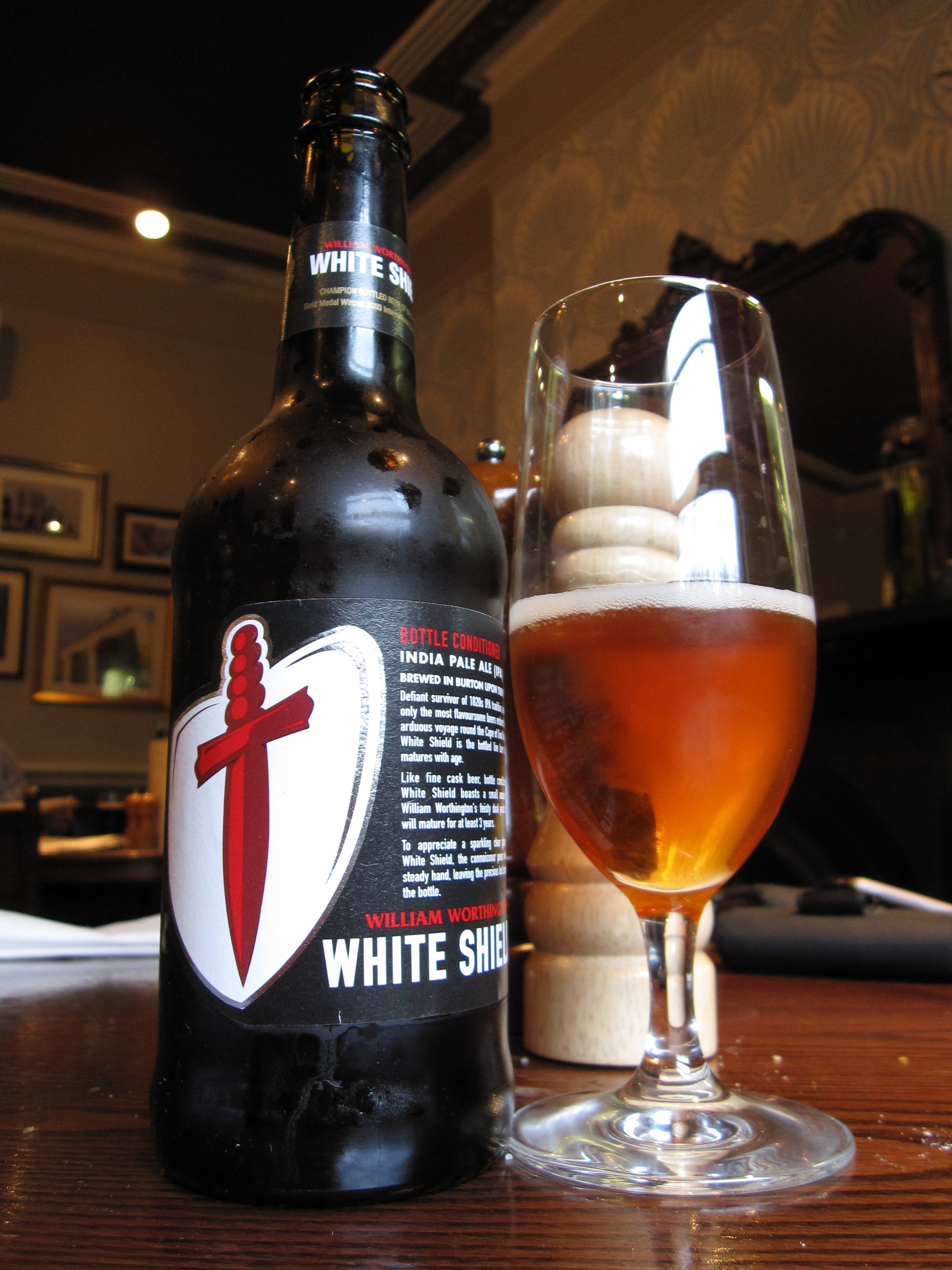
Worthington's White Shield

Worthington's White Shield (5.6% ABV) was an India Pale Ale available principally in bottle conditioned form, but also in casks. It won the CAMRA Champion Bottled Beer of Britain Gold award three times, more than any other beer.

In 1829, Worthington launched East India Pale Ale, their first IPA. It was exported to British expatriates across the Empire, mostly officers and civil servants, as the soldiers tended to drink the cheaper porter. In the 1870s it gained the White Shield logo, and by the end of the nineteenth century took on this name with drinkers.

By the 1960s White Shield had become a cult drink brewed in small quantities for a dedicated following; production in 1965 was just 15,000 barrels as drinkers switched to filtered and pasteurised bottled and keg beers. It found renewed popularity in the early 1970s as the demand for real ale grew, but lost this position as cask ale became easier to find. Bass moved production from Burton to their Hope & Anchor brewery in Sheffield in 1981. The Hope & Anchor brewery closed in 1992, and production was moved to Cape Hill in Birmingham, before being contracted to King and Barnes of Sussex in 1998. By this time, production was down to just 1,000 barrels a year, and the beer's long-term survival was in doubt. The King and Barnes brewery closed in 2000, and production moved to the Bass owned White Shield microbrewery in Burton upon Trent.

In 2000, a total of 500 barrels were produced; this was forecast to grow to 1,000 barrels by 2009. In 2010, production was moved to the newly constructed William Worthington's Brewery, a microbrewery based at the National Brewery Centre in Burton. It also produces other Worthington beers such as Red Shield and seasonal beers. In 2012, increasing demand saw White Shield production moved to the main Coors brewery in Burton. In 2013, Roger Protz described White Shield as the highest selling bottle conditioned beer in Britain. In 2020 White Shield was discontinued in all formats and is no longer available.

== Advertising ==
The Worthington Cup logo in 2001

1920s print advertisements linked the brand with Englishness alongside classic images of the Lake District and other national areas of beauty. Throughout the 1970s Worthington E was marketed as "The taste that satisfies..." Advertising in the mid-1990s focused on Creamflow, with a series of television advertisements featuring comedian Harry Enfield.

=== Logo ===
The brewery's blood red heart shield and dagger logo was introduced in 1863. The name was changed to Worthington's in 2002 and shield became more obviously heart shaped. The shield was restored in 2011, and the brand's design was modified to resemble its 1920s appearance.

=== Sponsorship ===
Worthington's is involved in sponsorship of rugby union and rugby league. It is a major sponsor of Gloucester RFC (with whom it has been affiliated since 1983), Scarlets, Ospreys, Newport Gwent Dragons, Pontypridd RFC and Oldham R.L.F.C. From 1998 until 2003 it sponsored the Football League Cup to the cost of £23 million.

Since 2011, the brand has sponsored the St. Simon Stakes at Newbury Racecourse.

== See also ==
- Brewers of Burton
