= Abraham Bass (cricketer) =

English cricketer

Abraham Bass (23 February 1804 – 15 August 1882) was an English cricketer known as 'the father of Midland cricket'. He played first-class cricket for the North in 1840 and 1841 and for Nottinghamshire in 1843.

== Biography ==
Bass was born in Burton-upon-Trent, the third son of brewer Michael Bass and his wife Sarah Hoskins. He was the main influence behind the founding of Burton Cricket Club in 1827. In 1840 he played two matches for the North against Marylebone Cricket Club (MCC) at Lords and at Burton and one match in 1841 at Burton. In 1843 he played a match for Nottinghamshire against Hampshire. He played eight innings in four first-class matches with an average of 4.50 and a top score of 10.

Bass is subsequently recorded as playing for various teams against an All England XI in 1847, for Burton in 1848 and for Gentlemen of Staffordshire in 1852. He was a noted authority on batting technique, referred to as "our good friend Mr Abraham Bass – and what cricketer in the Midland Counties defers not to his judgement".

Bass married Margaret Jane Lloyd, daughter of Rev George Lloyd vicar of Gresley, Derbyshire on 10 May 1852. They had a son, Roger. They lived at Moat Bank, Ashby Road, Winshill where he died on 15 August 1882 at the age of 78.
