= Samuel Allsopp & Sons =

Former brewery in Burton upon Trent, England

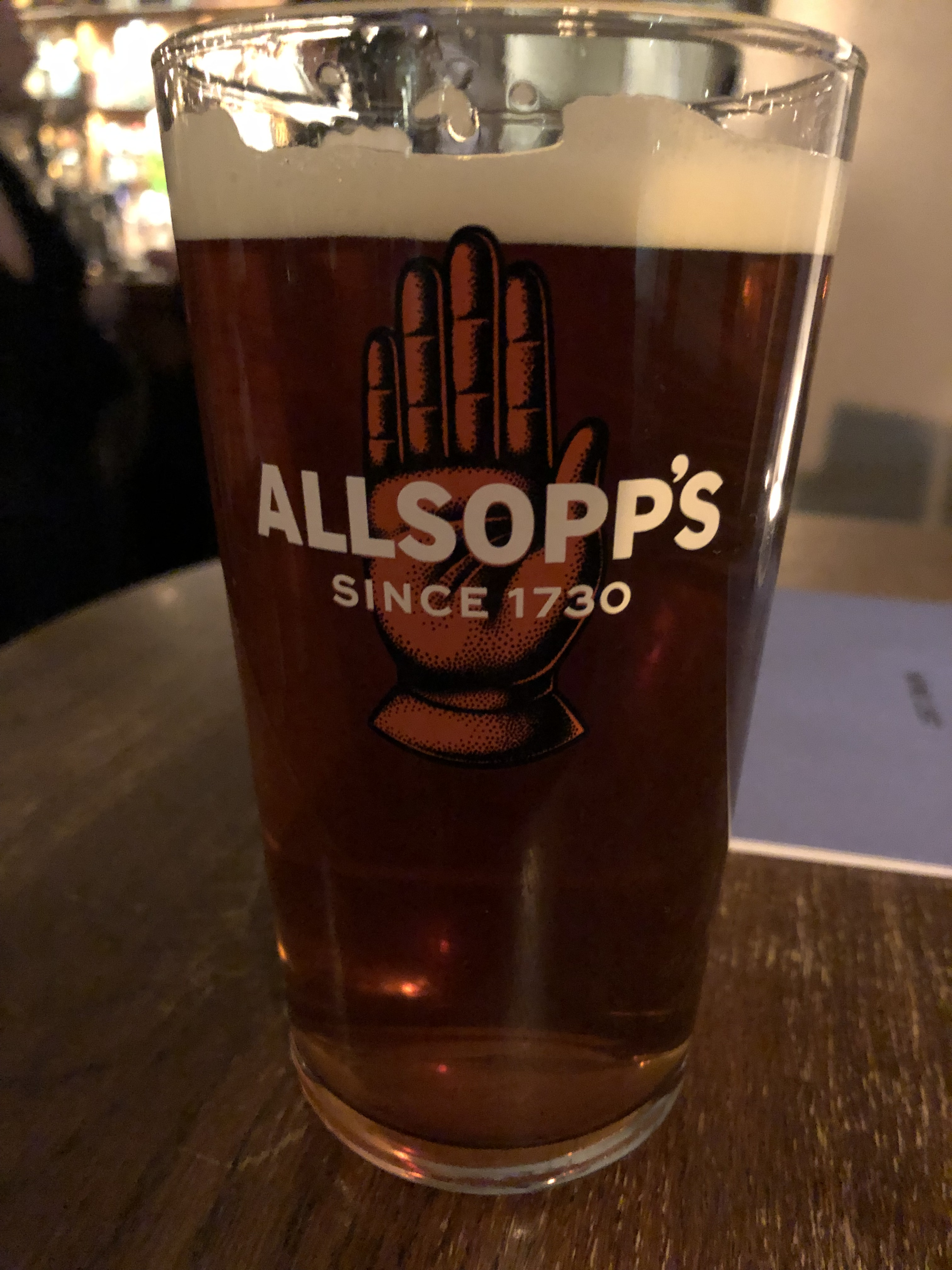
- A pint of Allsopp's beer
- Founded: 1807 (219 years ago); Burton, Staffordshire, England
- Founder: Benjamin Wilson
- Website: www.allsopps.com

Samuel Allsopp & Sons was one of the largest breweries operating in Burton upon Trent, England. It was revived as Allsopp's in the 2020s.

== History ==
=== Origins ===
Allsopp's origins go back to the 1740s, when Benjamin Wilson, an innkeeper-brewer of Burton, brewed beer for his own premises and sold some to other innkeepers. Over the next 60 years, Wilson and his son and successor, also called Benjamin, cautiously built up the business and became the town's leading brewer. In about 1800, Benjamin Jr took his nephew Samuel Allsopp into the business. In 1807, following a downturn in trade because of the Napoleonic blockade, he sold his brewery to Allsopp for £7,000.

Allsopp struggled at first as he tried to replace the lost Baltic trade with home trade, but in 1822 he successfully copied the India Pale Ale of Hodgson, a London brewer, and business started to improve.

=== Commercial success ===
After Samuel's death in 1838, his sons Charles and Henry continued the brewery as Allsopp & Sons. In 1859, they built a new brewery near the railway station, and added a prestigious office block in 1864. By 1861, Allsopp's was the second-largest brewery after Bass. Henry Allsopp retired in 1882 and his son Samuel Charles Allsopp took over.

=== Issue of shares, financial problems ===
Allsopps was incorporated as a public limited company in 1887 under the style Samuel Allsopp & Sons Limited. There were scuffles at the doors of the bank in the City as potential investors fought for copies of the prospectus, but within three years, these investors were demanding their money back as the returns were much lower than predicted. Under Samuel Allsopp, who became the 2nd Lord Hindlip on the death of his father, Allsopps lurched from crisis to crisis. A lack of tied houses, in addition to the ambitious 1897 introduction of a lager plant, which did not meet sales expectations, proved to be a major financial burden. With the difficult trading conditions for beer at the beginning of the 20th century, many Burton breweries were forced to close down or amalgamate. After a failed attempt at a merger with Thomas Salt and Co and the Burton Brewery Company in 1907, Allsopp's fell into the hands of the receivers in 1911. The receiver, Sir William Barclay Peat, brought in John J. Calder, a 45-year-old experienced brewery manager from Alloa in Scotland to revive the business.

=== Merger, Allsopp name dropped ===
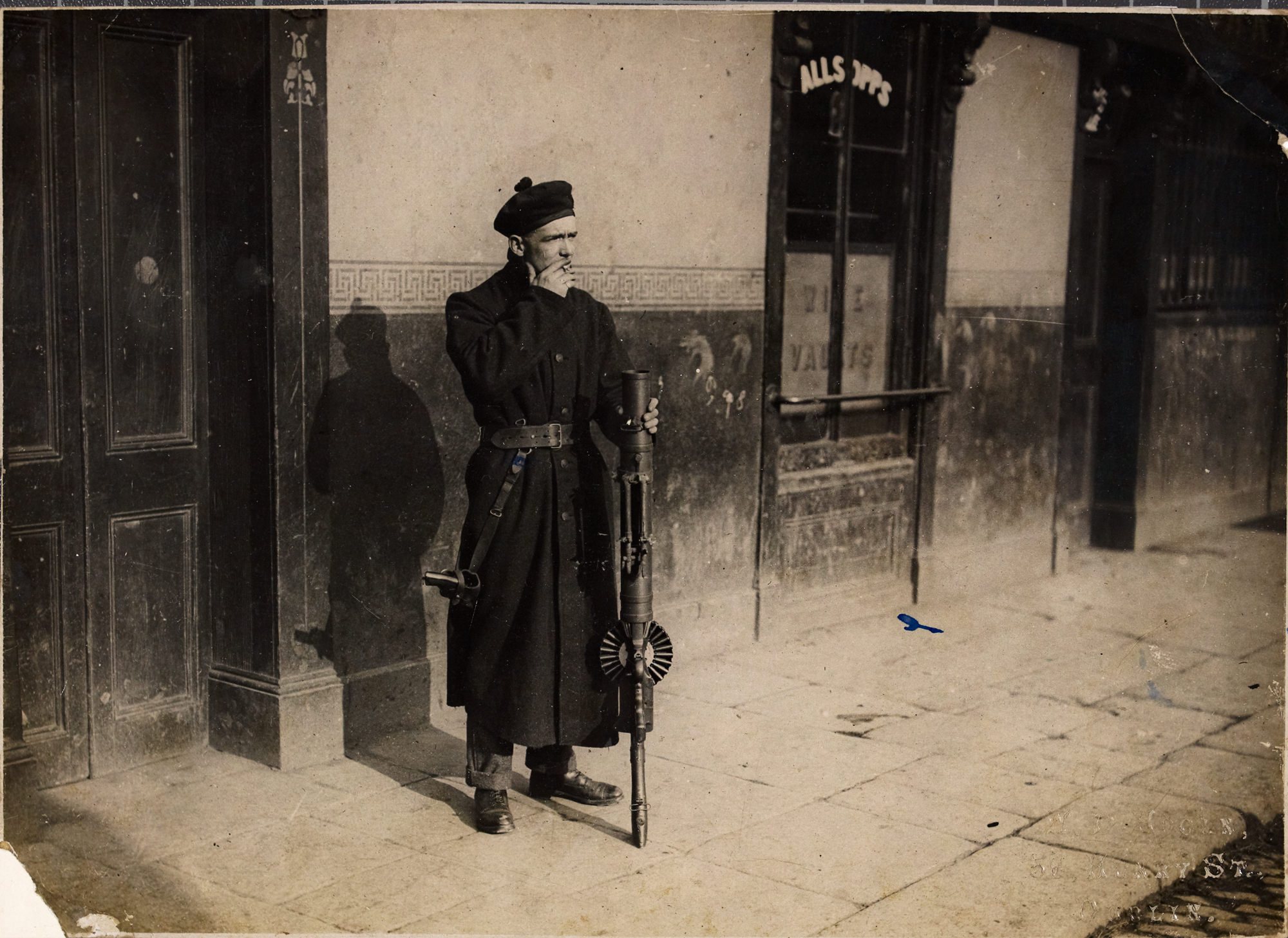
An advertisement to right background for Allsops on the window of Hynes pub in Railway Street, Dublin in 1921.

The company's capital was restructured, Calder proceeded to acquire smaller breweries in order to expand Allsopp's tied house estate, and the business continued trading. In 1921, Calder transferred the idle lager plant to Alloa, where it later produced the forerunner brands of Skol lager. In 1935, Samuel Allsopp & Sons merged with Ind Coope Ltd to form Ind Coope and Allsopp Ltd. The Allsopp name was dropped in 1959, and in 1971 Ind Coope was incorporated into Allied Breweries.

=== Revival ===
In August 2017, the Scottish craft brewery Brewdog put in an application to acquire an Allsopp trademark. In their 2018 Manifesto, James Watt stated that they were working with beer historian Martyn Cornell to recreate the original century recipe. This may have influenced AbInBev bringing back Bass Pale in the UK as the original IPA.

Jamie Allsopp, a direct descendant of Samuel Allsopp, has consolidated the scattered trademarks and found possibly the only remaining ledger containing the authentic recipes. The revived company commenced test brewing in 2020, staying as close as possible to the original recipes.

== Notable products ==
Among the company's notable products was Allsopp's Arctic Ale, originally produced for Sir George Nares' 1875 North Pole expedition. An unopened bottle of the beer was sold at auction in 2015 for £3,300. In 2025, Scottish brewery Innis & Gunn announced plans to brew a new version of the beer, named Innis & Gunn 1875 Arctic Ale, in partnership with Allsopp's, using the unopened original as a seed.

== See also ==
- Brewers of Burton
