= Thomas Salt and Co =

Former brewery in Burton upon Trent, England

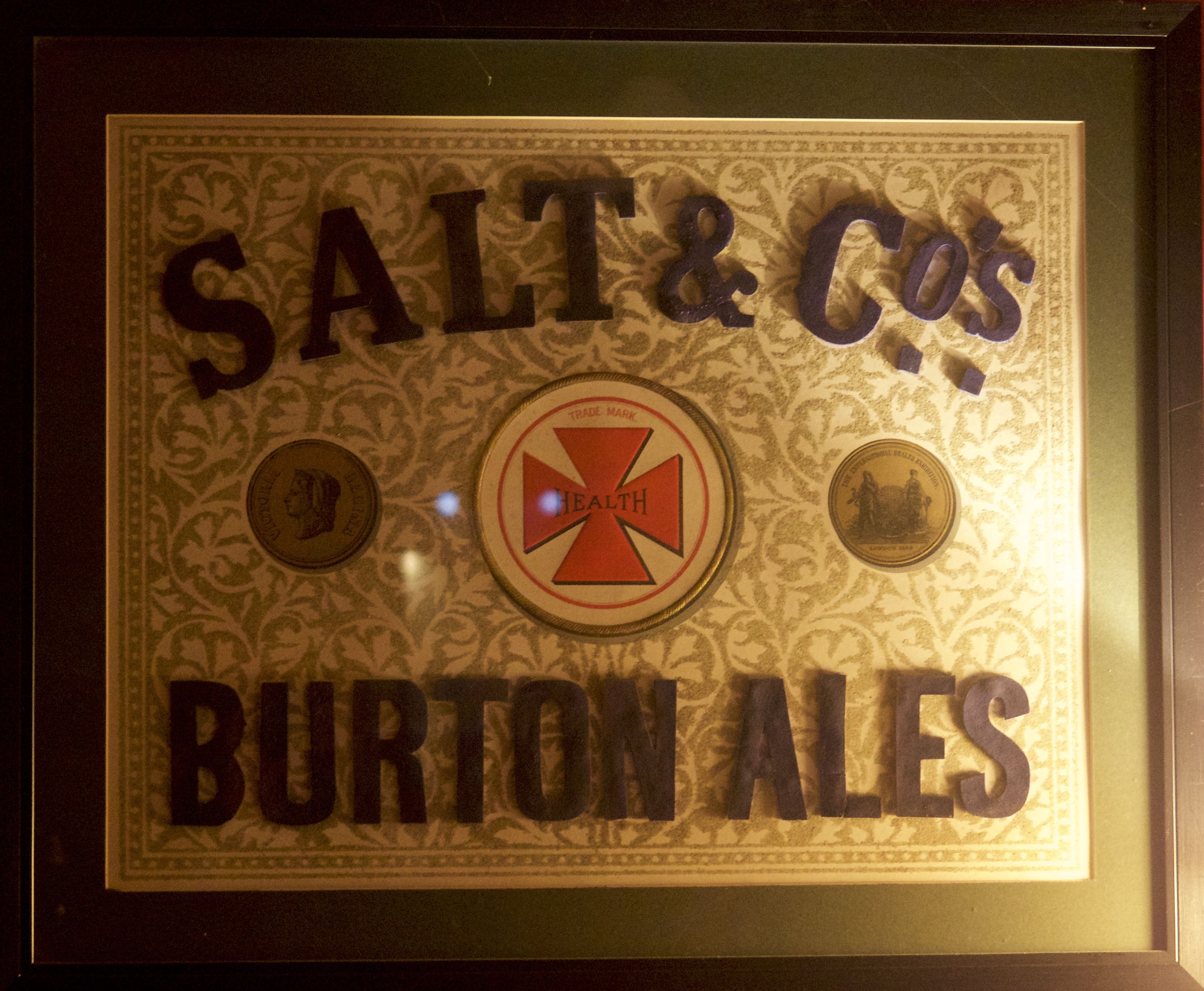
Thomas Salt & Co. Maltese Cross trademark

Thomas Salt and Co. was a brewery that operated in Burton upon Trent, England, between 1774 and 1927; over 150 years.

== History ==
=== 18th century ===
The brewery was founded in 1751 as Clay's Brewery by Joseph Clay I (1726-1800), who came originally from Merrybower, near Derby. Some time before Joseph Clay I died in 1800, his son Joseph II (1756-1824) took over the business, and was described in The "British Directory" of 1791 as one of the famous "nine common brewers of Burton-on-Trent." Joseph II also acquired the Leeson brewery, and later opened one of the first banks in Burton, and delegated the brewery management to his maltster, Thomas Salt. He sold out to Salt just before the Napoleonic Blockade, which led to a dramatic decline in beer exports. Burton brewers had exported large quantities of beer to the Baltic, importing in exchange timber and iron to make the barrels.

In “The Curiosities of Ale and Beer”, John Bickerdyke records that Thomas Salt is included in the list of brewers in the town records in 1789. According to Bickerdyke, Salt's Maltings were adjacent to Clay's brewery in 1774 and by 1789 Salt had started his own brewery. Thomas Salt later worked Clay's brewery as part of his own brewery at 119 High Street, Burton.

=== 19th century ===
Prior to 1802 Thomas Salt, Francis Pitt, Edward Marston and John Allen were in partnership as common brewers under the firm of Thomas Salt & Co. In 1802 Edward Marston left the partnership, leaving the other three to continue. In 1804 Thomas Salt passed his share in the company to his son, Thomas Salt the Younger. When Thomas Salt the Younger died in 1813 his son, Thomas Fosbrooke Salt, was only 5 years old. In 1818 the brewery was running in High Street and Susan Salt (widow of Thomas Salt) was also living in High Street. At some point after this the brewery was managed chiefly by Thomas Fosbrooke Salt, under the name Salt and Co.

In 1853 Henry Wardle (Thomas Fosbrooke Salt's son-in-law) joined Salt in the business and in due course Salt's sons Edmund and William also became directors. Henry George Tomlinson, who had joined the company as its chemist also joined the board. When pale ale became popular, Salts like other Burton firms responded to the public's changed tastes and Salt's IPA became particularly well-known. The company’s workforce grew from 194 in 1861 to 400 in 1888 making it one of the major breweries in Burton behind Bass, Worthington, and Samuel Allsopp & Sons.

In 1889 Alfred Barnard visited the brewery and included an extensive account in his The noted breweries of Great Britain and Ireland.

After Henry Wardle died in 1892, the company became a public limited company. In an era of expansion in the 1890s, the company took over John Bell and the Anchor Brewery. By the end of the century the company had tied houses as far away as Cheltenham and Gloucester.

=== 20th century ===
In the difficult trading conditions in the first decade of the 20th century, Salts were by 1906 unable to pay interest on shares and tried to effect a merger with Allsopps and the Burton Brewery Company. This was opposed by some of the debenture holders, and the company went into receivership in 1907. The company was restructured financially by depriving the Directors of almost all the value of their holdings, but survived until 1927, when it was taken over by Bass for £1,177,773.
