= Michael Thomas Bass (1760–1827) =

English brewer (1760–1827)

- Born: 23 July 1760; England
- Died: 9 March 1827 (aged 66)
- Occupation(s): Brewer, businessman
- Spouse: Sarah Hoskins
- Children: Michael Thomas Bass, Abraham Bass
- Parent: William Bass

Michael Thomas Bass (23 July 1760 – 9 March 1827) was a brewer of Burton-on-Trent, England, who considerably developed the Bass brewing company.

== Biography ==
Bass was the son of William Bass, a carrier from Leicestershire, who founded the brewery in 1777. After his father's death in 1787, Michael ran the brewery with his brother William until he took sole control in 1795. He continued to develop the Baltic trade with Russia and North Germany, exporting via the River Trent and Hull.

He extended the brewery's operations, laying the foundations for its future success. He entered into partnership with John Ratcliff and in 1799 he built a second brewery at Burton. Following the Napoleonic blockade, Burton brewers needed another market, and Bass was one of the breweries to start brewing and exporting India Pale Ale (IPA).

Bass married Sarah Hoskins, the daughter of Abraham Hoskins of Burton and Newton Solney. Sarah's brother, Abraham, built Bladon Castle, a folly which aroused bad feeling locally. Sarah's great-grandfather George Hayne was responsible for establishing the Trent Navigation as an active concern.

Bass died at the age of 66. His eldest son, Michael Thomas Bass continued to manage the brewery company and was MP for Derby for over 35 years. His third son Abraham Bass was an influential cricketer, known as the 'father of Midlands cricket'.
