= Charrington Brewery =

British brewery

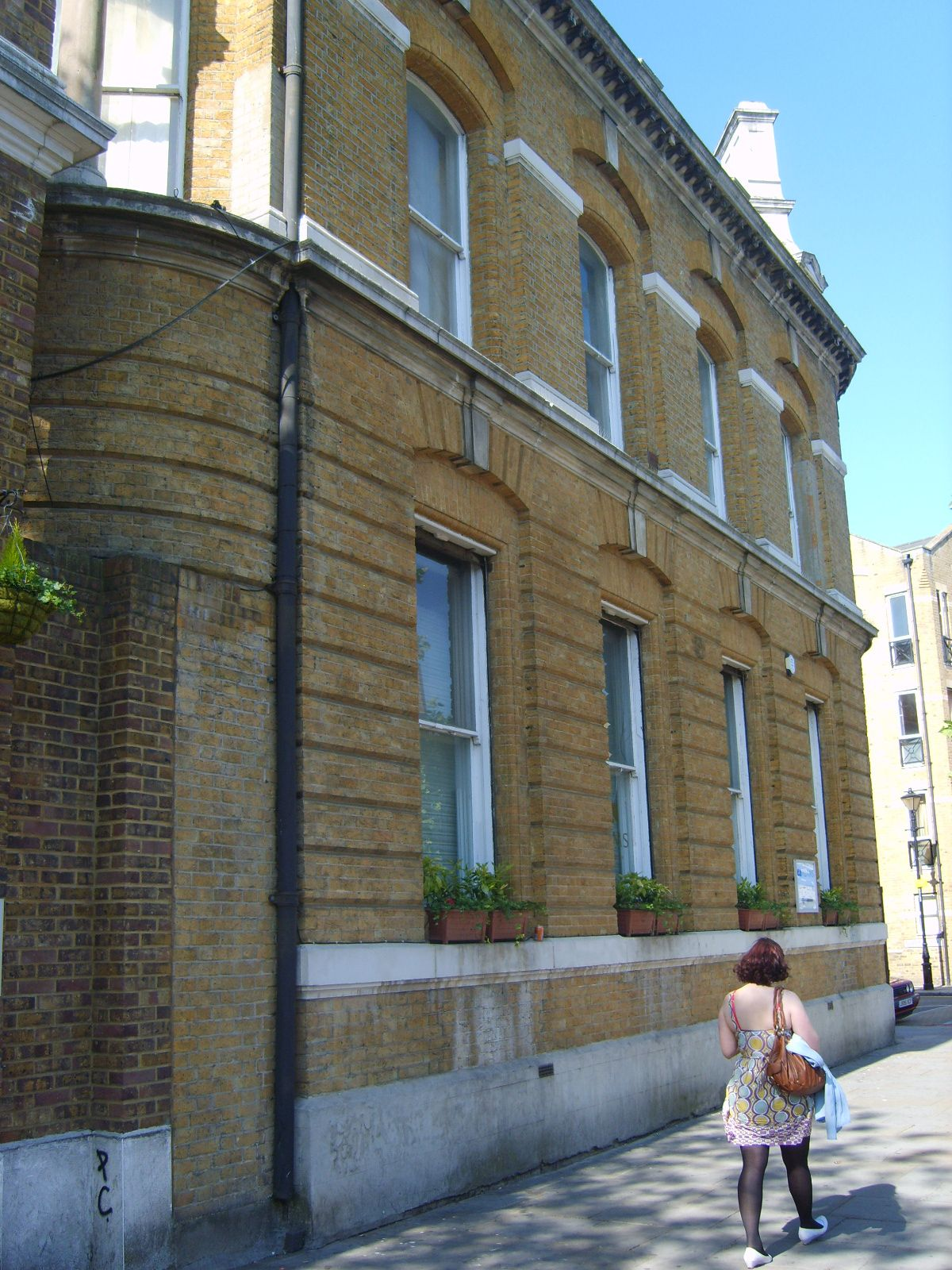
The offices of the Charrington Brewery in Mile End Road

Charrington Brewery was founded in Bethnal Green, London, in the early 18th century by Robert Westfield. In 1766, John Charrington joined the company, which then traded as Westfield, Moss & Charrington from the Anchor Brewery in Stepney. It merged with United Breweries of London in 1964, and with Bass Brewery in 1967 to become the largest UK brewing company, Bass Charrington. The brewing operations of the company were bought by Interbrew (now Anheuser-Busch InBev) in 2000, while the retail side (hotel and pub holdings) were renamed Six Continents. In 2003, Six Continents split into a pubs business, now known as Mitchells & Butlers, and a hotels and soft drinks business, now known as InterContinental Hotels Group.

== History ==
The company was formed in Bethnal Green in the early 18th century by Robert Westfield. He is known to have been a member of the Brewers' Company from 1738. In 1757, Joseph Moss became a partner, and the brewery moved to new premises at Anchor Brewery in Mile End. In 1766, John Charrington, who had brewed with Hale brewers in Islington, became third partner in the company, which then traded as Westfield, Moss & Charrington. Westfield retired in 1769, and his share in the partnership was purchased by Charrington. After Moss retired in 1783, Charrington and his brother, Henry, were in full control of the business. Henry (Harry) lived at Malplaquet House, 137-139 Mile End Road, from 1794 to 1833.

By 1807/8, they were the second largest brewers in London, producing 20,252 barrels of beer per year. Following Charrington's death in 1815, the business was continued by his brother and his son, Nicholas, who had joined the partnership in 1806.

The firm acquired Steward & Head in Stratford-upon-Avon, in 1833 and subsequently traded as Charrington & Head Co. The company took over Lewis Meakin's Abbey Brewery in Burton upon Trent in 1872 to become one of the breweries in Burton. Nicholas's two sons, Edward and Spencer, succeeded their father in 1859, and following the death of Head in 1880, the firm was known as Charrington & Co. The London and Burton breweries were operated as separate concerns until 1897, when Charrington & Co Ltd was registered in July to acquire the business of both breweries.

The People's Refreshment House Association's large chain of freehold and leasehold properties were acquired by Charrington & Co. Ltd. from the beginning of 1962.

In 1962, Charrington United Breweries Limited was registered to undertake the merger of Charrington & Co Ltd and United Breweries Ltd by an exchange of shares. In 1967, Charrington merged with Bass and Mitchell & Butlers and formed Bass Charrington Limited. In 1997, Bass Charrington sold off its public houses. The buyer then created Punch Taverns. In 2000, the company sold off its brands to Interbrew and remaining properties to Six Continents.

== Breweries ==
The Anchor Brewery on Mile End Road ceased production in January 1975, but remained the company's head office. By now, most of the brewery buildings have been demolished.

Bottling and warehousing facilities were also housed in a former distillery at Three Mills, in Bromley-by-Bow. Today, the site at Three Mills is used as offices serving a film studio complex, and the main Anchor Brewery site has been redeveloped as housing, offices and a shopping centre.

The company took over the brewing business of:

- Gray and Dacre Brewery, West Ham, Essex, in 1846.
- Joseph Friends Bell, Peterborough Lane, Parson's Green, Fulham, London, in 1890.
- Walter & John Fline East, Oil Mill Lane, Kingston upon Thames, Surrey in 1891.
- Walker & Son Ltd, Wellington Brewery, Wellington Street, Gravesend, Kent in 1903.
- Campbell, Johnstone & Co. Ltd, Phoenix Brewery, Latimer Road, Notting Hill, London in 1909.
- Brook's Peckham Brewery, Peckham Hill Street, Peckham, London in 1916.
- Savill Brothers Ltd, Stratford Brewery, Maryland Road, Stratford, London in 1925.

The Brewing of Pale Ale was transferred from Abbey Brewery, Burton-on-Trent, to the Anchor Brewery, London in 1925 and the former was closed in 1926 and sold with 86 tied houses.

- Lewis Meakin Brewery, Abbey Brewery, Burton-upon-Trent, closed 1926.
- Edward Tilney & Co, Alma Brewery, Spelman Street, Whitechapel, London in 1927.
- Seabrooke & Sons Ltd, Thurrock Brewery, Bridge Road, Grays, Essex in 1929.
- Hoare & Co. Ltd, Red Lion Brewery, Lower East Smithfield, London in 1933, closed in 1934.
- Thompson & Son Ltd, Walmer Brewery, Walmer, Kent in 1950.
- Properties from Charles Hammerton & Co Ltd, Stockwell, Stockwell Green, London in 1951.
- Batey & Co, Mineral Water manufacturers in 1952.
- Kemp Town Brewery, Brighton, East Sussex in 1954, closed 1963.
- Brutton, Mitchell & Toms Ltd, Princes Street, Yeovil, Somerset in 1960, closed in 1965.
- People's Refreshment House Association Ltd and Yeo, Retcliffe & Dawe, wine merchants, Barnstaple, Devon in 1961.
- Offiler's Brewery Ltd, Vine Brewery, Ambrose Street, Derby, in 1965.
- Dunmow Brewery Ltd, Dunmow Brewery, North Street, Great Dunmow, Essex in 1965.
- Massey's Burnley Brewery Ltd, Bridge End Brewery, Westgate, Burnley, Lancashire in 1966.

== Products ==
- Charrington's Anchor Stout
- Charrington's Brown Ale
- Charrington's Pale Ale
- Charrington's Pilsner Lager
- Punch Stout
- Royal Toby Ale
- Toby Ale
- Toby Export Lager Beer
- Toby Lager
- Toby Stout

== Adams House ==
The Anchor Brewery ceased production in January 1975, and most of the buildings were demolished. The brewery gave its name to the Anchor Retail Park that was built after the bulk of the brewery was demolished. The remaining structure of the Anchor Brewery, on the corner of Mile End Road and Cephas Avenue, is a block of offices named Adams House, and a residential part named Charrington House. The building is Grade II listed.

Anchor House was purchased by the senior partners of Adams Solicitors, and renamed Adams House. Throughout 2008 and 2009 they undertook comprehensive renovation works to restore the building. As well as being Grade II listed, Adams House is protected under the Stepney Green Conservation Area. A report by Tower Hamlets Council in October 2007 described Adams House as:

"...an unusual corner building which makes a positive contribution to the area, both because of its architectural quality and its historic importance as a surviving part of the large brewery which dominated the site for a long period of time."

== See also ==
- Brewers of Burton
