= Bass Brewery =

British brewery

Coordinates: 52.807°N 1.632°W

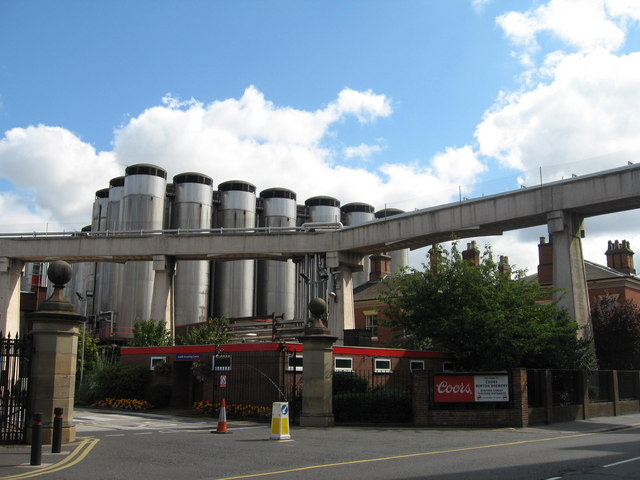
- Industry: Brewing
- Founded: 1777; 249 years ago
- Founder: William Bass
- Fate: Brewing operations sold to Molson Coors. The remaining operations renamed Six Continents
- Successor: AB InBev (brand rights), InterContinental Hotels Group (hotels), Mitchells & Butlers (pubs and restaurants), Molson Coors (brewing in Burton), Carlsberg Group (Soft Drinks business)
- Headquarters: Burton-upon-Trent, Staffordshire (brewery); Luton, Bedfordshire (Bass brand), England
- Products: Beer
- Production output: 365,000 hectolitres (311,000 US bbl) in 2011
- Website: www.bass.com

Bass Brewery (/ˈbæs/) was a British brewery company founded in 1777 by William Bass in Burton-upon-Trent, Staffordshire, England. The main brand was Bass Pale Ale, once the highest-selling beer in the UK. By 1877, Bass had become the largest brewery in the world, with an annual output of one million barrels. Its pale ale was exported throughout the British Empire, and the company's red triangle became the UK's first registered trade mark.

Bass took control of a number of other large breweries in the early 20th century. In the 1960s it merged with Charrington United Breweries to become the largest UK brewing company, Bass Charrington. The brewing operations of the company were bought by Interbrew (now Anheuser-Busch InBev) in 2000, while the retail side (hotels and pubs) was renamed Six Continents plc and also retaining Britvic. Because at the time Interbrew controlled a large portion of the UK beer market, the Competition Commission instructed Interbrew to sell the Bass brewery along with certain brands to Coors (now Molson Coors), while retaining the rights to the Bass brand. In 2010, it was widely reported that AB-InBev was attempting to sell the rights to the Bass brand in the UK for around £10 million to £15 million.

In the UK, draught Bass (4.4% ABV) has been brewed under contract in Burton by Marston's (formerly a relatively minor competitor) for AB-InBev since 2005, while bottled products are brewed at AB-InBev's own brewery in Samlesbury, Lancashire, for export. Bass is also brewed locally in the United States and Belgium. Bass Ale is a top ten premium canned ale in the UK, with 16,080 hectolitres sold in 2010.

== History ==
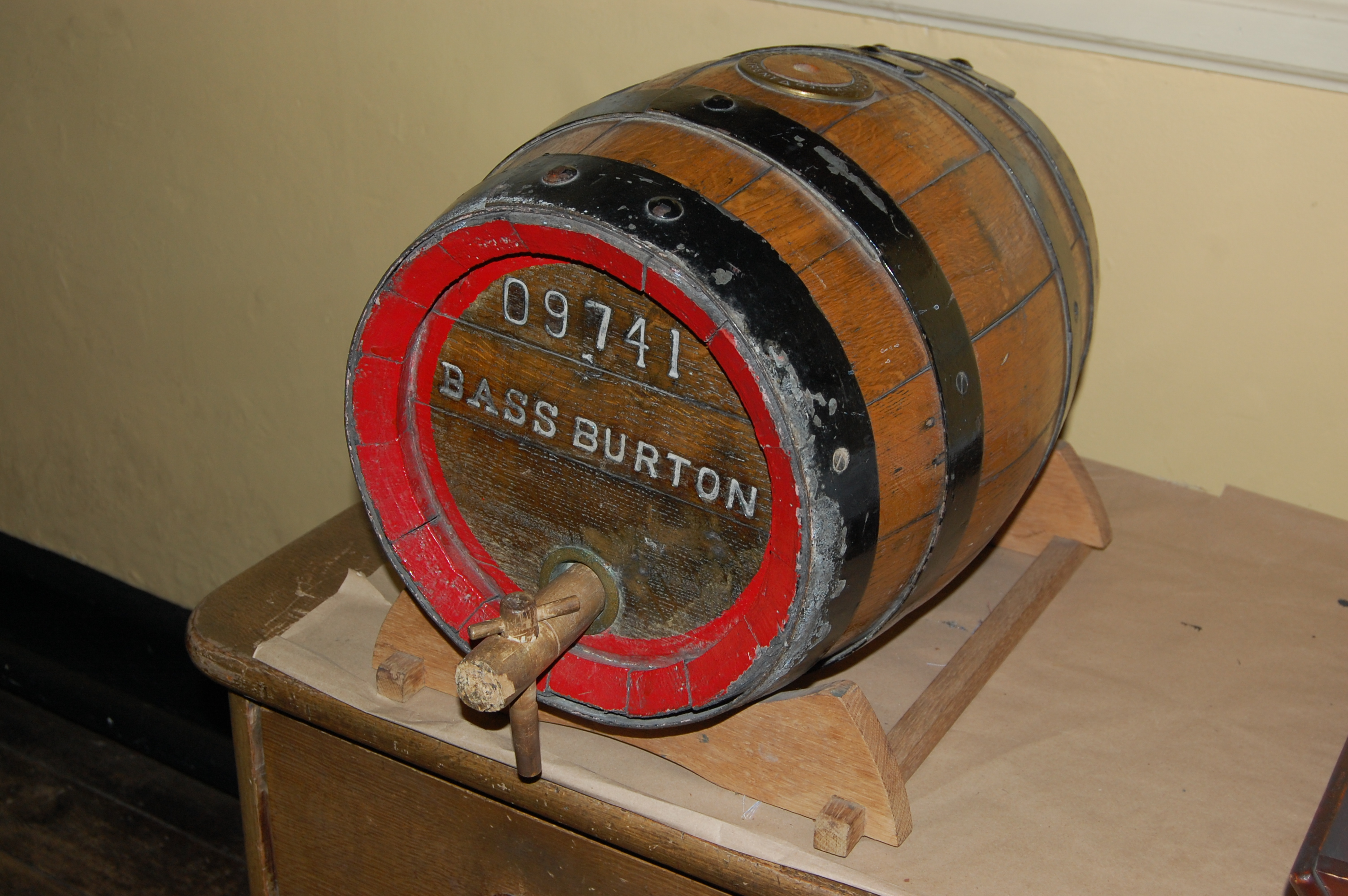
A small wooden barrel from the Bass Brewery, now in the Staffordshire County Museum at Shugborough Hall

=== 18th century ===
Before establishing a brewery, William Bass transported ale for brewer Benjamin Printon. Bass sold this carrier business to the Pickford family, using the funds to establish Bass & Co Brewery in 1777 as one of the first breweries in Burton-upon-Trent.

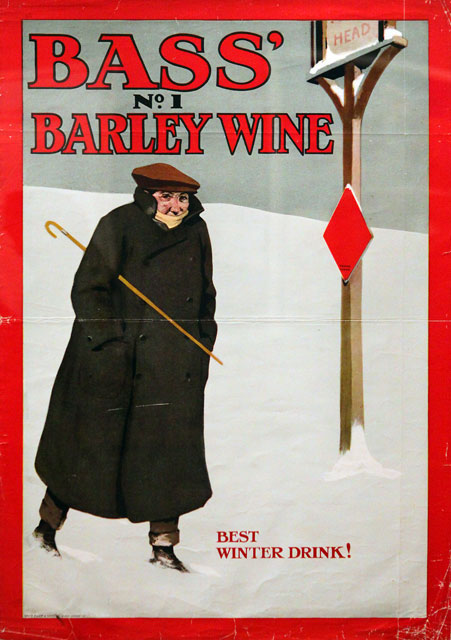
Advertisement for Bass' No.1 Barley Wine, showing the Bass Red Diamond

=== 19th century ===
Early in the company's history, Bass was exporting bottled beer around the world, serving the Baltic region through the port of Hull. Growing demand led his son Michael Thomas Bass (1760–1827), to build a second brewery in Burton in 1799 in partnership with John Ratcliff. The water from local boreholes became popular with brewers, with 30 operating there by the mid-19th century. His son, Michael Thomas Bass (1799–1884), succeeded on his father's death in 1827, renewed the Ratcliff partnership, brought in John Gretton, and created 'Bass, Ratcliff and Gretton'.

The opening of a railway through Burton in 1839 redoubled Burton's pre-eminence as a brewing town. In the mid-1870s, Bass, Ratcliff and Gretton accounted for one-third of Burton's output. A strong export business allowed Bass to boast that their product was available "in every country in the globe". By 1877, Bass was the largest brewery in the world, with an annual output of one million barrels. In the 1880s the brewery received unwanted publicity through the lifestyle of Frederick Gretton, son of John Gretton. Having worked for the company when a young man, he drifted away and developed a stable of racehorses. His 'Sterling' and 'Isonomy' were stars of the Turf. But Fred, as he was known, was also a heavy drinker and took a mistress, the teenage Fanny Lucy Radmall. In later life she would become a household name as Lucy, Lady Houston. When Fred died of drink in 1883 he left her £6,000 a year, much to the disgust of his family.

Following the death of the second Michael Thomas Bass in 1884, his son Michael Arthur Bass, later the 1st Baron Burton, took the reins. Both Michael Thomas Bass and his son Lord Burton were philanthropically inclined, making extensive charitable donations to the towns of Burton and Derby. The annual Bass excursions, laid on by the firm for its employees, were the largest operation of its type in the world by a private company. The brewer became a public limited company in 1888.

Bass' No. 1 Ale was the first beer to be marketed as barley wine, around 1870.

=== 20th century ===
Early in the 20th century, a declining market closed many Burton breweries, falling from 20 in 1900 to eight in 1928. Bass took over Walkers in 1923, and Worthington in 1927. Also in 1927, they acquired, for over £1,000,000, Thomas Salt, which was founded in 1774 as the Clay Brewery by Joseph Clay, who sold it to Salt, his maltster, just before the introduction by Napoleon of the Continental System that stopped all trade between Britain and Europe.

Bass was one of the original London Stock Exchange FT 30 companies when the listing was established in 1935. Over the next half-century, Bass maintained its UK dominance by acquiring such brewers as Mitchells & Butlers (1961), Sidney Fussell & Sons Ltd (1962), Charringtons (1967), Bents-Gartsides (1967), John Joule & Sons (1968), William Stones Ltd (1968), and Grimsby's Hewitt Brothers Ltd (1969), being variously known as Bass, Mitchells and Butlers or Bass Charrington. Draught Bass ale and Worthingon "E" were merged to become the same product until Bass became preferred as the name of the cask beer and Worthington for keg, although some pubs resisted this distinction.

Bass had been reliant on railways to distribute its beer from Burton, and owned the country's largest private rail network within the town linking its various premises. From the 1970s it followed the trend to abandon the use of rail freight, which had become notoriously unreliable. The switch to road haulage required local transport depots, and in many places small independent breweries were bought and repurposed as such. At that time, along with the other major brewers which now dominated the industry, Bass were moving away from the production of traditional ales in favour of keg beer and particularly Carling lager at Warrington, ignoring opposition from CAMRA.

In 1980, Bass merged its soft drink operations with those of rival Whitbread to form a new holding company, Britannia Soft Drinks. The new firm brought together Bass's Canada Dry Rawlings business with Whitbread's R. White's. In 1986, Allied Breweries merged their Britvic business into the company, with Bass holding a 50% shareholding and managing the business, while the other 50% was shared equally between Whitbread and Allied.

In 1988, Bass acquired the rights to franchise the Holiday Inn name outside of North and South America and in 1989 went on purchase the Holiday Inn hotel chain from Holiday Corporation.

==== 1989 "Beer Orders" ====
During the prime ministership of Margaret Thatcher, beer production, distribution and retailing were vertically integrated, with the "Big Six" brewers (Bass among them) accounting for a large portion of UK beer production and sales. Most pubs were "tied houses", owned by one of the brewers, and mostly selling its products.

On the advice of the Director-General of Fair Trading, the Monopolies and Mergers Commission (later the Competition Commission) released a report entitled "The Supply of Beer: A Report on the Supply of Beer for Retail Sale in the United Kingdom", investigating the nature of the beer industry. The report made recommendations to break up a "complex monopoly" among beer brewing and sales between the UK's "Big Six" (Allied, Bass, Courage, Grand Metropolitan, Scottish & Newcastle, and Whitbread), which at that time accounted for "75% of beer production, 74% of the brewer-owned retail estate, and 86% of loan ties." Recommendations to limit the number of pubs a brewing company could own were enacted in legislation in 1989, commonly called the "Beer Orders", with three years for brewers to dispose of excess pubs. Bass went from owning approximately 7,190 pubs in 1989 to about 2,077 in 2014 (by its successor company Mitchells & Butlers).

=== 21st century ===
Following decades of closures, consolidation, and the effects of the Beer Orders, Bass was left by the end of the 20th century as one of only two large remaining breweries in Burton. The Bass company decided to focus on hospitality rather than brewing and Bass' brewing business was sold to the Belgian brewer Interbrew (later Anheuser-Busch InBev) in June 2000. The UK government's Competition Commission again raised concerns about the monopoly implications arising from the deal and instructed Interbrew to dispose of the Bass brewery facility in Burton along with the Carling and Worthington brands, which were all sold to Coors (later Molson Coors). However, Interbrew was to retain the rights to the Bass Pale Ale brand.

With only hotel and pub holdings left in the Bass company's portfolio, the company renamed itself Six Continents plc, which itself split into Mitchells & Butlers and InterContinental Hotels Group in 2003.

Bottled and keg Bass formerly exported to the US with a higher alcohol content are now produced there domestically by Anheuser-Busch at a Baldwinsville, New York, facility.

==== Fate of the original Bass brewery in Burton upon Trent ====
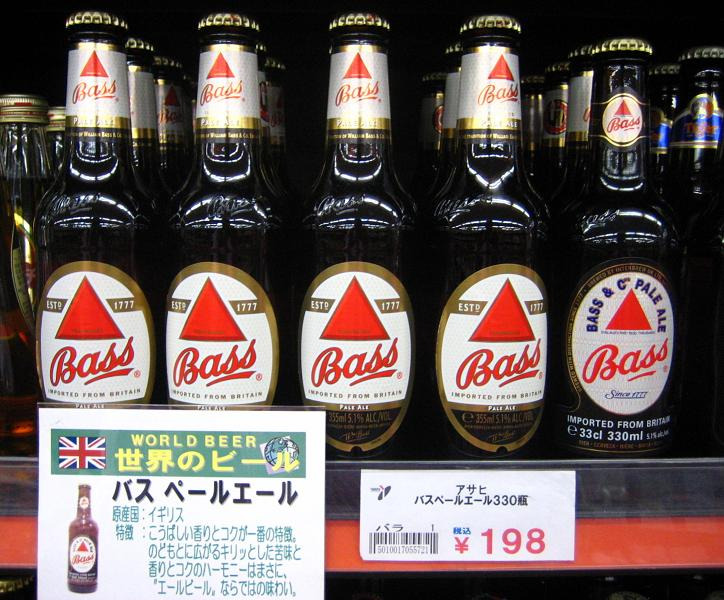
Bottles of Bass beer for sale at a liquor store in Iizaka, Fukushima, Japan

From 2000 to 2005, Bass was produced under licence by Molson Coors in Burton, in the original Bass brewery. When Coors' licence to brew draught Bass came to an end in 2005, a new licence was awarded to Wolverhampton & Dudley Breweries plc (later Marston's plc), which transferred production of Bass to its own brewery, also in Burton. The former Bass brewery in Burton, under Molson Coors ownership, underwent renovations in the early 21st century, and as of 2021 brews Carling and other beers for the UK and European market. In 2020, the historic Bass brewery site, adjacent to the contemporary brewery, was put on the market for redevelopment.

== Brewery museum ==
Sited next to the brewery, the Bass Museum of Brewing (later renamed the Coors Visitor Centre & The Museum of Brewing), was Burton-upon-Trent's largest tourist attraction until closed by Coors in June 2008. A steering group was established to investigate re-opening, and the museum was relaunched in May 2010 as the National Brewery Centre. It closed in 2022.

== Branding ==
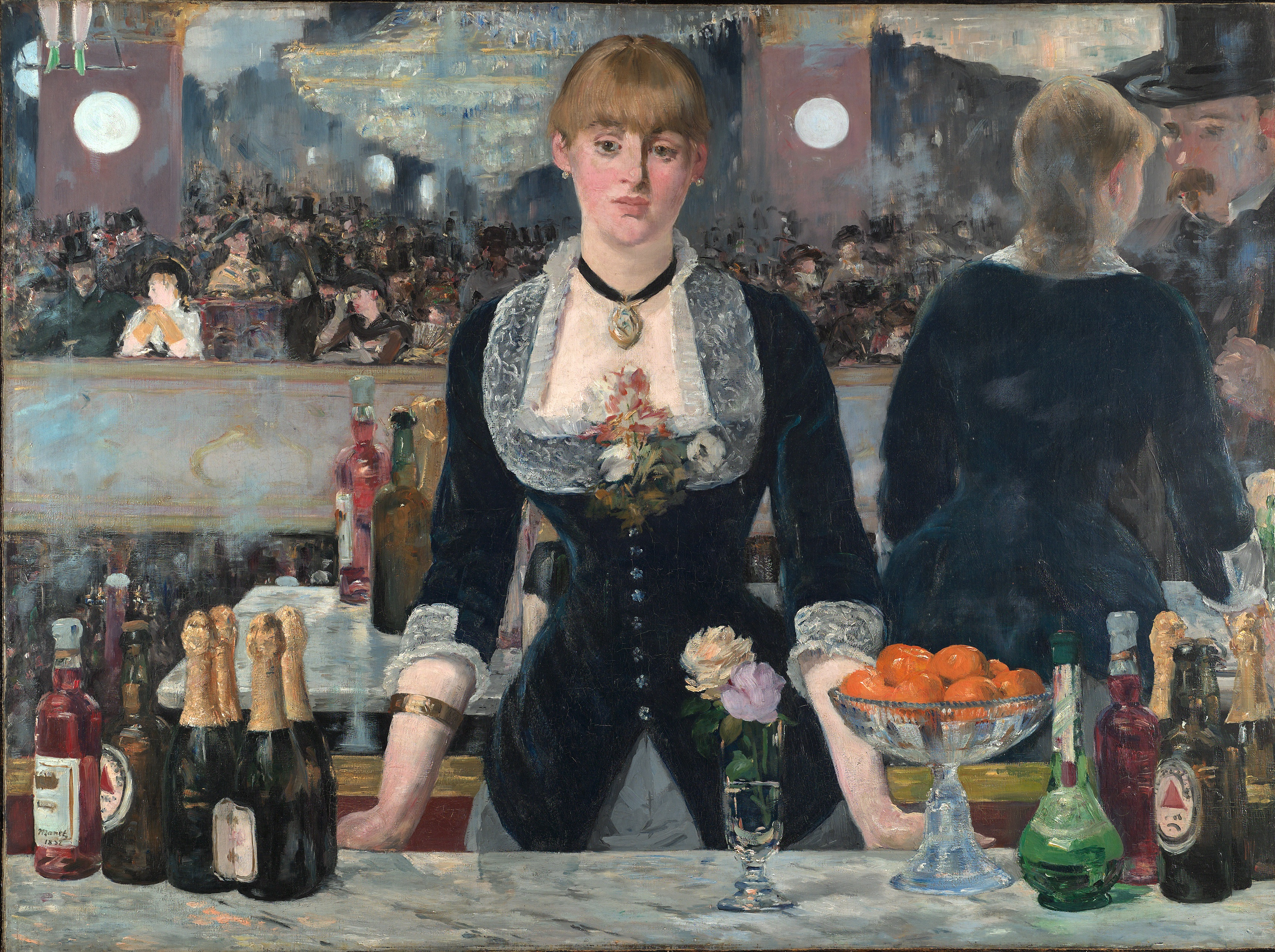
Bottles of Bass on the bar in Manet's 1882 A Bar at the Folies-Bergère

Bass was a pioneer in international brand marketing. "Many years before 1855" Bass applied a red triangle to casks of its Pale Ale. After 1855 the triangles were red, white or blue depending on which of three breweries it came from, but all bottles of Pale Ale had the red triangle from that date. The blue triangle was briefly revived after World War II for Pale Ale that was not bottle conditioned. The Bass Red Triangle was the first trade mark to be registered under the UK's Trade Marks Registration Act 1875. The Act came into effect on 1 January 1876 and legend has it that a Bass employee queued overnight outside the registrar's office on New Year's Eve in order to be the first in line to register a trade mark the next morning. As a result, Bass, Ratcliff & Gretton Limited received the first six registrations, the Bass Red Triangle for their pale ale and the Bass Red Diamond next for their strong ale (Numbers 3 to 6 have been abandoned). The trade marks are now owned by Brandbrew SA, an InBev subsidiary based in Luxembourg. In June 2013 InBev renamed Bass Pale Ale as Bass Trademark No.1.

== Cultural references ==
Bottles of Bass with the Red Triangle logo have occasionally appeared in art and literature, including Édouard Manet's 1882 painting A Bar at the Folies-Bergère and in over 40 paintings by Picasso, mostly at the height of his Cubist period around 1914. In the "Oxen of the Sun" episode of James Joyce's Ulysses, Bloom observes the Bass logo.

The references to the Red Triangle logo in Ulysses and in Manet and Picasso's works was the subject of the million-pound question of Who Wants to Be a Millionaire? top-prize winner Roman Dubowski on 26 April 2026.

=== Sponsorship ===
- Bass sponsored Derby County Football Club from 1984 to 1986.
- Bass sponsored Crewe Alexandra Football Club from 1986 to 1989.
- Bass sponsored Blackpool Football Club from 1988 to 1990.
- Bass sponsored Bohemian Football Club from 1993 to 1994.
- Bass was the main sponsor of Bristol Rugby for 2006–07.
- Bass was a major sponsor of Pontypridd RFC during the 2009–2011 seasons.

== Versions of Bass ==
=== Draught Bass ===
Draught Bass is a 4.4% ABV cask conditioned beer. Most prevalent near its Burton upon Trent and Derbyshire heartlands, it is brewed by Marston's in Burton in Yorkshire Squares using English hops and dry hopping and is described as "a classic ale with a malty, fruity, nutty aroma and a complex, satisfying flavour".

Bottled Bass is not bottle conditioned, and is brewed at Samlesbury, Lancashire, by AB InBev.

=== Bass Ale ===
An ale brewed for export, usually to around 5% ABV.

=== UK keg ales ===
- Bass Extra Smooth - A 3.6% ABV pasteurised keg version of Bass, brewed to the same recipe, and most popular in the South West of England.
- Bass Mild XXXX - A 3.1% ABV keg mild.
- Bass Best Scotch - A 3.4% ABV keg beer in the North East of England Scotch ale style. It was formerly brewed to 3.8% following its launch in 1986.

=== Shandy Bass ===
A 1.2% (later 0.5% ABV) shandy made with Bass beer and lemonade. A Pilsner variant in a white can was also available. Introduced in 1972, it was made by Britvic. It was discontinued in 2018.

== Bass overseas ==
=== Belgium ===
Bass Pale Ale has been brewed under licence in Belgium since the Interbrew takeover. It is typically sold in 25cl bottles at 5.2% ABV.

=== United States ===
Draught Bass has been exported to America since at least 1966. In 2001, 66,500,000 litres of Bass were sold in the United States. However Bass suffered under the custodianship of InBev and later Anheuser-Busch InBev as it is undergoing heavy decline in American consumption, with 24,200,000 litres sold in the country in 2010. Despite Molson Coors pledging funding to keep the brand active in the United States, Bass is no longer brewed anywhere in the country, and draught Bass has not been exported to the U.S. in decades.

=== Elsewhere ===
In 1860, Bass was the first foreign beer to be sold in Japan.

== See also ==
- Bass Maltings, Sleaford
- Black and Tan, a British drink popular in the US, often made with Bass and Guinness
- Coors Brewers
- List of breweries in England
- Listed buildings in Burton (civil parish)
