= Finney (surname) =

Finney is a surname. Notable people with the name include:

== Surname ==
=== Entertainment ===
==== Acting and filmmaking ====
- Albert Finney (1936–2019), English actor
- Desmond Finney, Sierra Leonean actor
- Edward Finney (1903–1983), American film producer and director
- Gavin Finney (born 1963), British cinematographer
- Mary Finney (1906–1973), American actress
- Shirley Jo Finney (1949–2023), American actress and theater director
- Victoria Finney, British actress
- Yasmin Finney (born 2003), British actress

==== Music ====
- Chick Finney (1911–1975), American jazz pianist and composer
- Ian Finney, English composer and guitarist
- Maury Finney (fl. 1976–1980), American country music saxophonist
- Ross Lee Finney (1906–1997), American composer

==== Painting ====
- Christine Lawrence Finney (1968–2016), American animator and painter
- Samuel Finney (painter) (1719–1798), English miniature-painter

=== Politics ===
- Darwin A. Finney (1814–1868), American politician in Pennsylvania
- Florence Finney (1903–1994), American politician in Connecticut
- Gail Finney (1959–2022), American businesswoman and politician in Kansas
- Joan Finney (1925–2001), American politician in Kansas
- Karen Finney (born 1967), American political consultant and commentator
- Louis C. H. Finney (1822–1884), American politician in Virginia
- Lowe Finney (born 1975), American politician in Tennessee
- Raymond Finney (born 1941), American politician in Tennessee
- Samuel Finney (politician) (1857–1935), British politician
- Victor Finney (1897–1970), English film company executive and politician

=== Sports ===
==== American football (gridiron) ====
- B. J. Finney (born 1991), American gridiron football player
- Redmond Finney (1929–2019), American gridiron football and lacrosse player
- W. P. Finney (1871–1954), American college football player and coach

==== Association football (soccer) ====
- Alan Finney (1933–2025), English footballer
- Bill Finney (born 1931), English footballer
- Charlie Finney (born 2003), English footballer
- Fred Finney (1924–2005), English footballer
- Ken Finney (1929–2018), English footballer
- Kevin Finney (born 1969), English footballer
- Oliver Finney (born 1997), English footballer
- Steve Finney (1973–2022), English footballer

==== Auto racing ====
- Bob Finney (1920–1999), American race car driver
- Brian Finney (racing driver) (born 1977), American racing driver and crew chief

==== Baseball ====
- Ed Finney (1924–1998), American baseball player in the Negro leagues
- Lou Finney (1910–1966), American baseball player

==== Cricket ====
- Roger Finney (born 1960), English cricketer
- William Finney (1866–1927), Welsh cricketer

==== Other sports ====
- Allison Finney (born 1958), American golfer
- Carl Finney (born 1965), British judoka
- Carolyn Finney, American ultimate player
- Jan Finney (born 1980), American mixed martial artist
- Jessica Finney (born 1995), British cyclist
- Mary-Ellen Finney, American rower
- Shawn Finney (born 1962), American college basketball coach
- Sid Finney (1929–2009), Northern Irish-born Canadian ice hockey player
- Stephen Finney (1852–1924), English rugby player

=== Writing ===
- Carolyn Finney (author) (born 1959), American author and educator
- Charles G. Finney (1905–1984), American newspaperman and writer
- Harry Anson Finney (1886–1966), American accountancy author
- Jack Finney (1911–1995), American author
- Nat S. Finney (1903–1982), American journalist
- Patricia Finney (born 1958), English author and journalist
- Ruth Finney (1898–1979), American journalist

=== Other areas ===
- Alex Finney (disambiguation), multiple people
- Ben Finney (1933–2017), American anthropologist, co-founder of the Polynesian Voyaging Society
- Brian Finney, British-American scholar of English literature
- Charles Grandison Finney (1792–1875), American revivalist
- Christopher Finney (born 1984), British soldier
- D. J. Finney (1917–2018), British statistician
- David Finney (disambiguation), multiple people
- Ernest A. Finney Jr. (1931–2017), American judge
- Hal Finney (disambiguation), multiple people
- Hilda Grayson Finney (1913–1976), American educator
- James Finney (disambiguation), multiple people
- John Finney (born 1932), British religious figure
- John Miller Turpin Finney (1863–1942), American surgeon and academic
- Kathryn Finney, American entrepreneur, founder of Genius Guild
- Leon Finney (disambiguation), multiple people
- Lydia Andrews Finney (1804–1847), American social reformer and evangelical
- Michael Finney (disambiguation), multiple people
- P. E. S. Finney (1904–1980), Indian police officer
- Thomas Finney (disambiguation), multiple people

== Hyphenated surname ==
- Sara Finney-Johnson (born 1957), American television producer, writer, and playwright
- Dorian Finney-Smith (born 1993), American basketball player
- John Morton-Finney (1889–1998), American civil rights activist, lawyer and educator

== Middle name ==
Listed alphabetically by surname

- Jennifer Finney Boylan (born 1958), American author and transgender activist
- Ida Finney Mackrille (1867–1960), American suffragist and a women's political leader in California
- Stephen Finney Mason (1923–2007), British chemist and historian

== See also ==
- Finney (disambiguation)
- Feeney (disambiguation)
