= Finn =

The word Finn (pl. Finns) usually refers to Finnish people, a Finnic ethnic group.

Finn or Finns may also refer to:

== Communities and ethnic groups ==
- Finnic peoples, various ethnic groups who speak Finnic languages
- Baltic Finnic peoples, various ethnic groups inhabiting the Baltic Sea region who speak Balto-Finnic languages
- Finnish citizen, a citizen of Finland
- Finn (ethnonym), an ethnonym for multiple Northern European peoples

== Places ==
- Finn Lake, Minnesota, United States
- Finn Township, Logan County, North Dakota, United States
- Lough Finn, a freshwater lough (lake) in County Donegal, Ireland
- River Finn (Foyle tributary), County Donegal, Ireland

== People ==
- Finn (given name), including a list of people with the given name
- Finn (surname), English and German-language surname

== Mythological figures ==
- Finn (dog), an English police dog and namesake of "Finn's Law" providing legal protection for animals in public service
- Finn (Frisian), Frisian king who appears in Beowulf and the Finnesburg Fragment
- Fionn mac Cumhaill (Old Irish: Finn mac Cumhal; anglicised to Finn McCool), a warrior in Irish mythology
- Various legendary High Kings of Ireland
  - Eber Finn, 1700 BC (AFM), 1287–1286 BC (FFE)
  - Cearmna Finn, 1533–1493 BC (AFM), 1155–1115 BC (FFE)
  - Finn mac Blatha, 952–930 BC (AFM), 725–705 BC (FFE)
  - Duach Finn, 904–894 BC (AFM), 679–674 BC (FFE)
  - Ailill Finn, 795–786 BC (AFM), 586–577 BC (FFE)
  - Fiatach Finn, 36–39 AD (AFM), 25–28 AD (FFE)

== Arts entertainment, and media ==
=== Characters ===
- Finn (comics), the titular character in the eponymous comic strip in the British comic anthology 2000 AD
- Finn (Misfits), one of the protagonists of the British TV series Misfits
- Finn (Star Wars), in the Star Wars films
- Finn the Human, one of the protagonists in the animated series Adventure Time
- Huckleberry Finn, a protagonist in the novels The Adventures of Tom Sawyer and Adventures of Huckleberry Finn
- Phineas Finn, protagonist of Anthony Trollope's novels Phineas Finn and Phineas Redux
- Finn Collins, in The 100 TV series
- Finn DeTrolio, in the TV series The Sopranos
- Finn Dodd, protagonist of the film How to Make an American Quilt and the novel of the same title
- Finn Hudson, in the television show Glee
- Finn McMissile, in the movie Cars 2
- Finn O'Connor (Hollyoaks), in the British soap opera Hollyoaks
- Finn Sharkey, in the TV series Waterloo Road
- Finn Whitman, in The Kingdom Keepers children's novel series
- Finn, a goldfish mascot in the Goldfish crackers brand
- Finn, in the Jackie Chan Adventures TV series
- Finn, in The Lego Movie franchise
- Finn, the wizard in the 1842 opera Ruslan and Lyudmila
- Finn, in the animated TV series Storm Hawks
- Finn, in the South Korean-Japanese cartoon series Tai Chi Chasers
- Finn, a character in the novel What I Was by Meg Rosoff
- The Finn, in William Gibson's science fiction Sprawl trilogy novels
- Finn, in the animated series Arcane

=== Music ===
- Finn (album), a 1995 album by the Finn Brothers
- "Finn", a song by Tori Amos for the 1998 Great Expectations soundtrack

=== Other uses in arts, entertainment, and media ===
- Finn: A Novel, a 2007 novel by Jon Clinch
- Finn.no, a Norwegian classified advertisements website
- "Finn", an episode in the television series The Lost World
- Farnborough International News Network (FINN), an aviation trade website published by Farnborough International Ltd

== Other uses ==
- Finn (dinghy), an Olympic class of sailing dinghy
- Finn, a variant of fin, a colloquial term for the U.S. five dollar bill
- The Finn (1912–1925), an American Thoroughbred racehorse
- Finns Party, a Finnish political party

== See also ==
- Fin (disambiguation)
- Fine (disambiguation)
- Finny (disambiguation)
- Flynn
