= Finny =

Finny may refer to:

- Steven Finn (born 1989), English cricketer
- William Finny (1864-1952), English politician and historian
- a nickname of Phineas Finn, protagonist of Anthony Trollope's novels Phineas Finn and Phineas Redux
- Finny, a character in the novel A Separate Peace by John Knowles
- Finny, County Mayo, a small village and townland in Ireland
- Finny snake eel

== See also ==
- Feeney (disambiguation)
- Finney (disambiguation)
- Finnie, a surname
- Phinney, a surname
