= Finnish identity card =

National identity card of Finland

Finnish national identity card
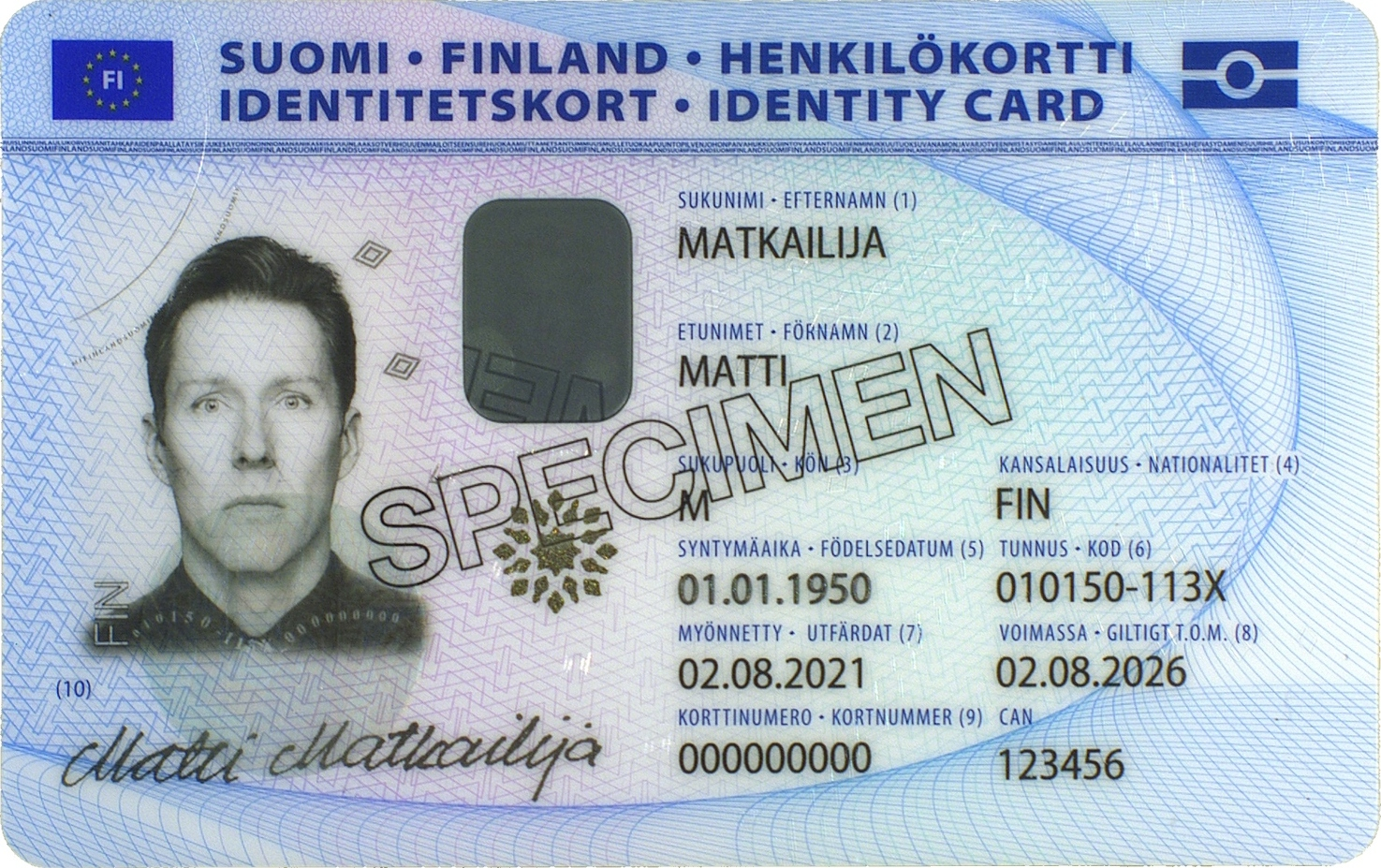
- Front of the card
- Type: Identity card, optional replacement for passport for travel to EU and EFTA countries.
- Issued by: Finland
- Purpose: Identification, travel
- Valid in: EFTA; European Union; United Kingdom (EU Settlement Scheme); Rest of Europe (except Belarus, Russia, and Ukraine) Georgia; Montserrat (max. 14 days); Greenland; Overseas France
- Eligibility: Finnish citizenship
- Expiration: 5 years

The front and reverse of a Finnish identity card (old-style)

The Finnish identity card (Finnish: henkilökortti; Swedish: identitetskort) is one of two official identity documents in Finland, the other being the Finnish passport. Any citizen or resident can get an identification card. Finnish citizens will get indication of citizenship on the card. It is available as an electronic ID card (Finnish: sähköinen henkilökortti; Swedish: elektroniskt identitetskort), which enables logging into certain services on the Internet, local computers or adding digital signatures into LibreOffice ODF documents or creating DigiDoc formatted containers that also allows encryption during content transfer. ID card is applied at a police station and it is issued by the police.

Possession of an ID card or any ID document is non-compulsory in Finland, though interactions with officials and companies, like voting, picking up a parcel from Posti offices or buying alcohol when a salesperson suspects buyer to be under 18 or 30 years old, can be difficult or impossible without an ID card, a passport or a driving licence.

Driving licences are also widely used for general identification purposes even though they are not officially recognised as such. Some places, such as the postal service, accept social security cards with the photograph of the bearer but they are not widely used and have not been issued in a long time.

In domestic non-electronic identification the driving licence has remained in a leading position, since most of the population have to have a licence anyway, and a driving licence is valid for almost every situation where non-electronic personal identification is needed.

In some cases, an emergency ID card, valid between 15 days to 3 months, is issued.

== Travel document ==
The Finnish identity card for citizens may be used as a travel document all over Europe (except Belarus, Russia, Ukraine and United Kingdom) as well as French overseas territories, Georgia, Greenland, Tunisia (on organized tours) and Montserrat (for max. 14 days). However, due to Finnish regulations, direct outbound travel from Finland to non-EU/EFTA countries requires a passport. From 2 August 2021, the European identity card is intended to replace and standardize the various identity card styles currently in use in the EU/EEA. (Note: The legal acquis has been identified as EEA-relevant by the EU Commission, which makes it under scrutiny for incorporation into the EEA Agreement by Iceland, Liechtenstein and Norway. However, the legal basis rely on Article 21 of the Treaty on the Functioning of the European Union, an article which is not reflected in the EEA Agreement.)

For travel within the Nordic countries no travel documents are legally required for Nordic citizens due to the Nordic Passport Union, however one must be able to prove their identity, for example with a passport, identity card or a Nordic driving license.

== Electronic ID Card ==
The electronic ID card was introduced in December 1999 and the current version, which is valid for 5 years, was introduced in 2003. All issued ID cards nowadays are electronic with the exception of card for minors and temporary cards.

It was initially planned as a general network authentication device for both public and private sector strong authentication needs. In 2009, however, the card was viewed by a government committee as a failure. There has been less than 300 000 cards around by 2011 out of population of 5.3 million. The rationale to apply for a card has mostly been traveling abroad. Only few dozen government services have adopted it, and only one bank adopted it as login card to their netbank. All banks in Finland use a national standard called TUPAS, which uses one-time passwords. Banks also provide TUPAS authentication to other Internet-enabled businesses. Since TUPAS requires no dedicated hardware, cost of a card reader and card itself have been main causes in the failure of the eID card.

Also the card itself is quite expensive, €51 in 2011. Earlier cost for a passport of the same 5 year validity period was the same as the cost of an ID card. In 2011 passport is only €2 more expensive. Thus pricing and validity period have also been too close to passport and have offered no benefits compared to passport with the exception of being easier to carry in a wallet or a handbag. As of 2015, the card costs €55 compared to €48 for a passport (for both documents, if applied for online there will be a €4 discount).

In 2009 a committee recommended discontinuation of eID card. The card and certification service development and maintenance costs were listed as being excessive compared to limited use the card had seen. However, as of December 2024, no action has been taken regarding the card or the citizen certificate, new cards with chips and certificates continue to be issued as before. The Finnish eID card experience, which is based on voluntary adoption and users paying the full cost, has proven to be very different when compared to the neighbouring countries' (cf. Estonian ID card).

== See also ==
- National identity cards in the European Union
