= Finney =

Finney may refer to:

== People ==
- Finney (surname)

== Places ==
Each in the United States

- Finney, Kentucky, an unincorporated community
- Finney, Texas, an unincorporated community
- Finney County, Kansas
- Finneytown, Ohio, a census-designated place
- Finneyville, Illinois, an unincorporated community

== Other uses ==
- Finney (TV series), a 1994 British television crime drama series
- Finney Creek, in the U.S. state of Wisconsin
- Finney High School, located in Detroit, Michigan, U.S.
- Finney Hotel, a historic building in Woodbury, Kentucky, U.S.
- Finney House (disambiguation), several American historic buildings
- Finney Peak, a summit in the U.S. state of Washington
- Finney strictureplasty, a procedure in gastroenterology

== See also ==
- Feeney (disambiguation)
- Finnie, a surname
- Finny (disambiguation)
- Phinney, a surname
