= Thomas Finney =

Thomas Finney may refer to:

- Thomas Finney (lawyer) (1925–1978), American lawyer and political strategist
- Thomas Finney (politician) (1837–1903), Australian businessman and politician
- Tom Finney (1922–2014), former English footballer
- Tommy Finney (born 1952), former Northern Ireland footballer

== See also ==
- Finney (surname)
