= Fort Finney =

Fort Finney may refer to:

- Fort Finney (Indiana), located in what is now Jeffersonville, Indiana, U.S.
- Fort Finney (Ohio), located near what is now Cincinnati, Ohio, U.S.

== See also ==
- Finney (disambiguation)
