= Fin (disambiguation) =

A fin is a thin appendage.

Fin, FIN, or Fins may also refer to:

== Biology ==
- Fish fin, an anatomical feature
- Fin fish, fish that possess fins
- Fin whale (Balaenoptera physalus)

== Film ==
- Fin (2021 film), an American documentary
- Fin (2023 film), a Filipino mystery drama
- Fin (French equivalent of "The End"), text placed at the end of a film

== People ==
- Fín (died 604), Gaelic princess, wife of Oswiu of Northumbria
- Fin Bartels (born 1987), German football midfielder
- Fin Boothroyd (born 1999), Canadian field hockey player
- Fin Donnelly (born 1966), Canadian politician
- Fin DAC, Irish street artist
- Fin Dow-Smith, (born 1988), British songwriter
- Fin Leavell, American musician
- Finlay Tarling (born 2006), Welsh cyclist
- Fin Taylor, (born 1990), English stand-up comedian
- Fin Wilson (1888–1959), American professional baseball pitcher
- Henri Fin (born 1950), French cyclist

== Fictional and mythical characters ==
- Fin (character), two Marvel Comics characters
- Fin (troll), in Danish legend
- Fin the Whale, the mascot of the Vancouver Canucks
- Fin Tutuola, on the TV drama Law & Order: Special Victims Unit

== Places ==
=== Iran ===
- Fin, Iran, a city
- Fin District
- Fin Garden, Kashan
- Fin Rural District

=== Elsewhere ===
- Fins, Somme, France
- Fin Island, Canada

== Music ==
- Fin (band), an English indie rock band
- Fin (John Talabot album), 2012
- Fin (Syd album), 2017
- "Fin", a 2006 song by Supergrass from the album Road to Rouen
- "Fin" (song), a 1986 song by Akina Nakamori
- "Fin", a song by Christie Front Drive from Christie Front Drive, 1997
- "Fin", a song by Nebula from the 2003 album Atomic Ritual
- "Fins" (song), a 1979 song by American singer Jimmy Buffett
- "(*Fin)", a song by Anberlin from their 2007 album Cities

== Sport ==
- Federazione Italiana Nuoto, the Italian Swimming Federation
- Miami Dolphins, an American football team
- Surfboard fin, a hydrofoil on a surfboard's tail

== Codes and identification numbers ==
- Finland, ISO 3166-1 alpha-3:FIN
- Finnish language, ISO 639-2:fin
- Finnair, a Finnish airline, ICAO code: FIN
- Facility ID number, in US broadcasting
- Family identification number, for asteroids
- Force identification number, in UK policing

== Other uses ==
- Fin, a slang term for the United States five-dollar bill
- Fin (company), formerly Intercom, an American software company
- Fin (extended surface), on a radiator
- Fin (geology), a narrow, residual wall of hard sedimentary rock
- Fin (submarine), a tower atop a submarine
- Internationalist League of Norway (Norwegian: Forbundet Internasjonalen i Noreg), a socialist group

== See also ==
- Swimfin, a fin-like shoe
- Tail fin (disambiguation)
- Finn (disambiguation)
