= Visa requirements for Finnish citizens =

Administrative entry restrictions

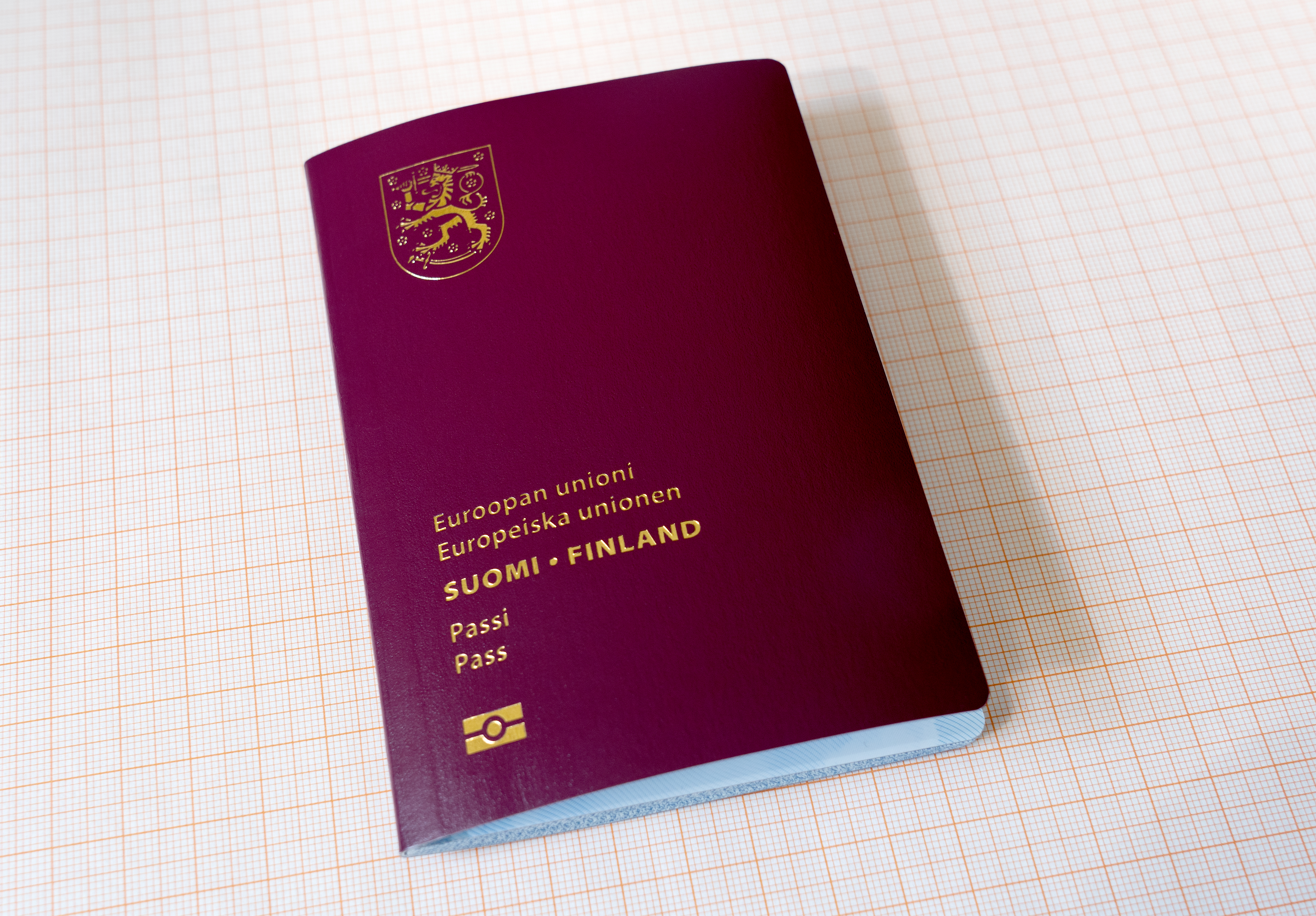
A Finnish passport

Visa requirements for Finnish citizens are administrative entry restrictions by the authorities of other states placed on citizens of Finland.

As of 2026, Finnish citizens had visa-free or visa on arrival access to 185 countries and territories, ranking the Finnish passport shared 4th in the world, according to the Henley Passport Index.

As a member state of the European Union, Finnish citizens enjoy freedom of movement within the European Economic Area (EEA). The Citizens’ Rights Directive defines the right of free movement for citizens of the EEA. Through bilateral agreements freedom of movement is extended to Switzerland, and all EU and EFTA nationals are not only visa-exempt but are legally entitled to enter and reside in each other's countries.

In order to travel to another country, a Finnish citizen requires a passport, except within the Nordic Passport Union, where no travel document is required, however traveler in the Nordic Passport Union must be able to prove their identity, for example with a passport, identity card or a Nordic driving license. A passport is also not required for holders of the Finnish identity card for travel to European countries (except Belarus, Russia, Turkey and Ukraine) as well as French overseas territories and Georgia.

== Visa requirements map ==
Visa requirements for Finnish citizens holding ordinary passports Finland Full freedom of movement (Nordic passport union) Freedom of movement Visa not required / ESTA / eTA / eVisitor Visa on arrival eVisa Visa available both on arrival or online Visa required

== Visa requirements ==
| Country | Visa requirement | Allowed stay | Notes (excluding departure fees) |
|---|---|---|---|
| Afghanistan | eVisa | | Visa is not required in case born in Afghanistan or can proof that one of their parents is a national of Afghanistan or born in Afghanistan.; e-Visa : Visitors must arrive at Kabul International (KBL). |
| Albania | Visa not required | 90 days | ID card valid. |
| Algeria | Visa required | | Visa Issuance for passengers with a boarding authorization traveling as tourists to cities in the south of Algeria (Timimoun, Ghardaia, Ilizi, Djanet or Tamanraset) can obtain a visa on arrival for a maximum of 30 days. They must have: a return/onward ticket, a hotel reservation confirmation. |
| Andorra | Visa not required | | ID card valid. |
| Angola | Visa not required | 30 days | Maximum 3 entries per calendar year; 30 days per trip, but no more than 90 days within any 1 calendar year for tourism purposes only.; Visitors must have a return/onward ticket and a hotel reservation confirmation.; An International Certificate of Vaccination is required. |
| Antigua and Barbuda | Visa not required | 6 months | |
| Argentina | Visa not required | 90 days | |
| Armenia | Visa not required | 180 days | |
| Australia | eVisitor | 90 days | 90 days on each visit in 12-month period if granted. |
| Austria | Visa not required | Freedom of movement.; ID card valid | |
| Azerbaijan | eVisa | 30 days | |
| Bahamas | Visa not required | 3 months | |
| Bahrain | eVisa / Visa on arrival | 14 days | |
| Bangladesh | Visa on arrival | 30 days | |
| Barbados | Visa not required | 90 days | |
| Belarus | Visa not required | 30 days | Visa-free until 31 December 2024. |
| Belgium | Visa not required | Freedom of movement.; ID card valid. | |
| Belize | Visa not required | | |
| Benin | eVisa | 30 days | Must have an international vaccination certificate. |
| Bhutan | eVisa | | Must pay 100 USD per person per day for Sustainable Development Fee |
| Bolivia | Visa not required | 90 days | |
| Bosnia and Herzegovina | Visa not required | 90 days | 90 days within any 6-month period.; ID card valid. |
| Botswana | Visa not required | 90 days | |
| Brazil | Visa not required | 90 days | 90 days within any 180 day period. |
| Brunei | Visa not required | 90 days | |
| Bulgaria | Visa not required | Freedom of movement.; ID card valid. | |
| Burkina Faso | eVisa / Visa on arrival | 1 month | |
| Burundi | Visa on arrival | 1 month | |
| Cambodia | eVisa / Visa on arrival | 30 days | |
| Cameroon | eVisa | | |
| Canada | eTA / Visa not required | 6 months | eTA required if arriving by air. |
| Cape Verde | Visa not required | 30 days | Must register online at least five days prior to arrival. |
| Central African Republic | Visa required | | |
| Chad | Visa required | | |
| Chile | Visa not required | 90 days | |
| China | Visa not required | 30 days | Visa-free from 8 November, 2024 to 31 December, 2026.; 240-hour (10-day) visa-free transit to a third country or region (including Hong Kong, Macau or Taiwan) using any mode of transport. Must have a confirmed onward ticket/itinerary, and enter through 1 of 64 approved ports.; During which, may freely travel within the 24 provinces permitted for visa-free transit and engage in tourism, business, and visits.; 24-hour visa-free transit to a third country or region (including Hong Kong, Macau, and Taiwan), is available at most international airports, without leaving the airport.; Travellers who need to leave the airport may obtain a temporary entry permit from immigration.; 5-day port visa (Visa on Arrival) for Shenzhen if arriving at designated ports of entry from Hong Kong by land or sea, for stays within Shenzhen.; 3-day port visa (Visa on Arrival) if arriving in Zhuhai or Xiamen at designated ports of entry, for stays within the respective city.; 15-day visa-free entry for cruise ship passengers in tour groups, if arriving at any cruise port along China's coastline, including but not limited to Tianjin; Dalian; Shanghai; Lianyungang; Wenzhou; Zhoushan; Xiamen; Qingdao; Guangzhou; Shenzhen; Beihai; Haikou; Sanya. May further travel inland to all regions of coastal provinces (and equivalents) and Beijing.; May apply for a port visa (Visa on Arrival) if travelling for an urgent, qualified reason. Prior clearance for port visa is highly recommended or may be denied boarding by airlines. |
| Colombia | Visa not required | 180 days | 90 days - extendable up to 180-days stay within a one-year period. |
| Comoros | Visa on arrival | | |
| Republic of the Congo | Visa required | | |
| Democratic Republic of the Congo | eVisa | 7 days | |
| Costa Rica | Visa not required | 90 days | |
| Côte d'Ivoire | eVisa | | e-Visa holders must arrive via Port Bouet Airport. |
| Croatia | Visa not required | Freedom of movement.; ID card valid. | |
| Cuba | Tourist card required | 90 days | Can be extended up to 90 days with a fee. |
| Cyprus | Visa not required | Freedom of movement.; ID card valid. | |
| Czech Republic | Visa not required | Freedom of movement; ID card valid | |
| Denmark | Visa not required | (Nordic Passport Union): Freedom of movement (including Faroe Islands and Greenland).; Any travel document not required. | |
| Djibouti | eVisa | 90 days | |
| Dominica | Visa not required | 90 days | 90 days within any 180 day period. |
| Dominican Republic | Visa not required | 90 days | Can be extended up to 120 days with fee |
| Ecuador | Visa not required | 90 days | |
| Egypt | eVisa / Visa on arrival | 30 days | |
| El Salvador | Visa not required | 3 months | |
| Equatorial Guinea | eVisa | | Must arrive via Malabo International Airport, processing fee 75 USD |
| Eritrea | Visa required | | |
| Estonia | Visa not required | Freedom of movement.; ID card valid. | |
| Eswatini | Visa not required | 30 days | |
| Ethiopia | eVisa / Visa on arrival | up to 90 days | Visa on arrival is obtainable only at Addis Ababa Bole International Airport.; e-Visa holders must arrive via Addis Ababa Bole International Airport.; e-Visa is available for 30 or 90 days. |
| Fiji | Visa not required | 4 months | |
| France | Visa not required | Freedom of movement (in Regions of France).; ID card valid. | |
| Gabon | eVisa | 90 days | e-Visa holders must arrive via Libreville International Airport. |
| Gambia | Visa not required | 90 days | |
| Georgia | Visa not required | 1 year | ID card valid. |
| Germany | Visa not required | Freedom of movement.; ID card valid. | |
| Ghana | Visa required | | |
| Greece | Visa not required | Freedom of movement.; ID card valid. | |
| Grenada | Visa not required | 3 months | |
| Guatemala | Visa not required | 90 days | |
| Guinea | eVisa | 90 days | |
| Guinea-Bissau | Visa on arrival | 90 days | |
| Guyana | Visa not required | 90 days | |
| Haiti | Visa not required | 90 days | |
| Honduras | Visa not required | 90 days | |
| Hungary | Visa not required | Freedom of movement.; ID card valid. | |
| Iceland | Visa not required | (Nordic Passport Union): Freedom of movement.; Any travel document not required. | |
| India | eVisa | 30 days | e-Visa holders must arrive via 32 designated airports (Note: Ahmedabad; Amritsar; Bagdogra; Bengaluru; Bhubaneswar; Chandigarh; Chennai; Coimbatore; Delhi; Gaya; Goa-Dabolim; Goa-Manohar; Guwahati; Hyderabad; Indore; Jaipur; Kannur; Kochi; Kolkata; Kozhikode; Lucknow; Madurai; Mangaluru; Mumbai; Nagpur; Port Blair; Pune; Surat; Thiruvananthapuram; Tiruchirappalli; Varanasi; Visakhapatnam) or 5 designated seaports. (Note: Chennai; Cochin; Mormugao (Goa); Mumbai; Mangalore); An Indian e-Tourist Visa may only be obtained twice within 1 calendar year.; Foreigners of Pakistani origin or who hold a Pakistani Passport are not eligible for an e-Visa. Foreigners who are not Pakistani nationals, but whose parents or grandparents (either paternal or maternal) were born in, or were permanent residents in Pakistan, are also not eligible for an e-Visa. |
| Indonesia | e-VOA / Visa on arrival | 30 days | |
| Iran | eVisa | 30 days | |
| Iraq | eVisa | 60 days | |
| Ireland | Visa not required | Freedom of movement.; ID card valid. | |
| Israel | Electronic Travel Authorization | 90 days | |
| Italy | Visa not required | Freedom of movement.; ID card valid. | |
| Jamaica | Visa not required | 90 days | |
| Japan | Visa not required | 90 days | |
| Jordan | eVisa / Visa on arrival | 30 days | Visa can be obtained upon arrival, it will cost a total of 40 JOD, obtainable at most international ports of entry and land border crossings (except King Hussein/Allenby Bridge) |
| Kazakhstan | Visa not required | 30 days | |
| Kenya | Electronic Travel Authorisation | 3 months | Applications can be submitted up to 90 days prior to travel and must be submitted at least 3 days in advance.; eTA fee is 32.50 USD.; Proof of reservation at the hotel where visitors plan to stay is required (if staying with friends, an invitation letter is also acceptable).; Yellow fever vaccination certificate is required if coming from endemic countries. |
| Kiribati | Visa not required | 90 days | 90 days within any calendar year |
| North Korea | Visa required | | |
| South Korea | Electronic Travel Authorization | 90 days | The validity period of a K-ETA is 3 years from the date of approval. |
| Kuwait | eVisa / Visa on arrival | 3 months | |
| Kyrgyzstan | Visa not required | 60 days | |
| Laos | Visa not required | 15 days | Visa not required from 1 July to 31 December 2024.; eVisa and Visa on arrival also available.; 18 (Note: Savannakhet Airport; Lanetoui - Mengkang (China); Meuangmom - Wan Pong (Myanmar); Banvang - Ban Khok Phai (Thailand); Namngeun - Huay Kon (Thailand); Paksan - Bueng Kan (Thailand); Paktaphan - Pak Saeng (Thailand); Pangmon - Ban Huak (Thailand); Phoudou (Thailand); Dak ta ock - Nam Giang (Vietnam); La Lai (Vietnam); Namkan (Vietnam); Namphao - Cau Treo (Vietnam); Namsoy - Na Meo (Vietnam); Naphao - Cha Lo (Vietnam); Pahang - Long Sap (Vietnam); Panghok - Tây Trang (Vietnam); Phoukeua - Bo Y (Vietnam)) of the 33 border crossings are only open to regular visa holders.; e-Visa may be used to enter Laos through the Luang Prabang, Pakse and Vientiane international airports, 3 Thai-Lao Friendship Bridges (Note: Vientiane (Friendship Bridge 1); Savannakhet (Friendship Bridge 2); Bokeo (Friendship Bridge 4)), in Boten (road and railroad), and in Vientiane (at Khamsavath railway station).; Visa on arrival is available at the Luang Prabang, Pakse and Vientiane international airports, 4 Thai-Lao Friendship Bridges (Note: Vientiane (Friendship Bridge 1); Savannakhet (Friendship Bridge 2); Khammouane (Friendship Bridge 3); Bokeo (Friendship Bridge 4)) and 7 border crossings. (Note: Nongnokkheane - Trapeang Kriel (Cambodia); Boten - Bo han (China); Golden Triangle/Samliemkham (Thailand); Khamsavath railway station (Thailand); Namheuang - Ban Na Kraseng (Thailand); Vang tao - Chongmek (Thailand); Dansavan - Lao Bảo (Vietnam)) |
| Latvia | Visa not required | Freedom of movement.; ID card valid. | |
| Lebanon | Free visa on arrival | 1 month | Extendable for 2 additional months.; Granted free of charge at Beirut International Airport or any other port of entry if there is no Israeli visa or seal, holding a telephone number, an address in Lebanon, and a non refundable return or circle trip ticket. |
| Lesotho | Visa not required | 14 days | 44 days eVisa also available |
| Liberia | Visa required | | |
| Libya | eVisa | | |
| Liechtenstein | Visa not required | Freedom of movement.; ID card valid. | |
| Lithuania | Visa not required | Freedom of movement.; ID card valid. | |
| Luxembourg | Visa not required | Freedom of movement.; ID card valid. | |
| Madagascar | eVisa/Visa on arrival | 60 days | |
| Malawi | Visa not required | 30 days | |
| Malaysia | Visa not required | 90 days | |
| Maldives | Free visa on arrival | 30 days | |
| Mali | Visa required | | |
| Malta | Visa not required | Freedom of movement.; ID card valid. | |
| Marshall Islands | Visa not required | 90 days | 90 days within any 180 day period. |
| Mauritania | eVisa | | Available at Nouakchott–Oumtounsy International Airport. |
| Mauritius | Visa not required | 180 days | 180 days per calendar year for tourism, 120 days per calendar year for business |
| Mexico | Visa not required | 180 days | |
| Micronesia | Visa not required | 90 days | 90 days within any 180 day period. |
| Moldova | Visa not required | 90 days | 90 days within any 180 day period. |
| Monaco | Visa not required | | ID card valid. |
| Mongolia | Visa not required | 30 days | The Ministry of Foreign Affairs of Mongolia has exempted visas for 34 countries from January 2023 to December 2026. |
| Montenegro | Visa not required | 90 days | ID card valid for 30 days. |
| Morocco | Visa not required | 90 days | |
| Mozambique | Visa not required | 30 days | Travelers must register on the e-Visa platform at least 48 hours prior to travel and pay a processing fee of 650 MT. |
| Myanmar | eVisa | 28 days | e-Visa holders must arrive via Yangon, Nay Pyi Taw or Mandalay airports or via land border crossings with Thailand — Tachileik, Myawaddy and Kawthaung or India — Rih Khaw Dar and Tamu.; e-Visa available for both tourism (allowed stay is 28 days) or business (allowed stay is 70 days) purposes. |
| Namibia | Visa not required | 3 months | 3 months within a calendar year. |
| Nauru | Visa required | | |
| Nepal | Online Visa / Visa on arrival | 90 days | |
| Netherlands | Visa not required | Freedom of movement (European Netherlands).; ID card valid. | |
| New Zealand | Electronic Travel Authority | 3 months | International Visitor Conservation and Tourism Levy must be paid upon requesting an Electronic Travel Authority.; Holders of an Australian Permanent Resident Visa or Resident Return Visa may be granted a New Zealand Resident Visa on arrival permitting indefinite stay (pursuant to the Trans-Tasman Travel Arrangement), subject to meeting character requirements and obtaining an Electronic Travel Authority prior to departure. Such travellers are not required to pay the International Visitor Conservation and Tourism Levy. |
| Nicaragua | Visa not required | 90 days | |
| Niger | Visa required | | |
| Nigeria | eVisa | 90 days | |
| North Macedonia | Visa not required | 90 days | ID card valid. |
| Norway | Visa not required | (Nordic Passport Union): Freedom of movement.; Any travel document not required. | |
| Oman | Visa not required / eVisa | 14 days / 30 days | |
| Pakistan | eVisa | 90 days | |
| Palau | Visa not required | 90 days | 90 days within any 180 day period. |
| Panama | Visa not required | 90 days | |
| Papua New Guinea | Easy Visitor Permit | 60 days | Available at Gurney Airport (Alotau), Mount Hagen Airport, Port Moresby Airport and Tokua Airport (Rabaul). |
| Paraguay | Visa not required | 90 days | |
| Peru | Visa not required | 90 days | 90 days within any 6-month period. |
| Philippines | Visa not required | 30 days | |
| Poland | Visa not required | Freedom of movement.; ID card valid. | |
| Portugal | Visa not required | Freedom of movement.; ID card valid. | |
| Qatar | Visa not required | 90 days | |
| Romania | Visa not required | Freedom of movement.; ID card valid. | |
| Russia | eVisa | 30 days | 72-hours visa free visit when entering by regular ferry via port of St. Petersburg, provided that a passenger spends the night on-board or in accommodation specifically approved by the travel agency. |
| Rwanda | eVisa / Visa on arrival | 30 days | |
| Saint Kitts and Nevis | Electronic Travel Authorisation | 3 months | |
| Saint Lucia | Visa not required | 90 days | 90 days within any 180 day period. |
| Saint Vincent and the Grenadines | Visa not required | 90 days | 90 days within any 180 day period. |
| Samoa | Visa not required | 90 days | 90 days within any 180 day period. |
| San Marino | Visa not required | | ID card valid |
| São Tomé and Príncipe | Visa not required | 15 days | |
| Saudi Arabia | eVisa / Visa on arrival | 90 days | |
| Senegal | Visa not required | 90 days | |
| Serbia | Visa not required | 90 days | 90 days within any 6-month period.; ID card valid. |
| Seychelles | Visa not required | 3 months | |
| Sierra Leone | eVisa / Visa on arrival | 30 days | |
| Singapore | Visa not required | 90 days | |
| Slovakia | Visa not required | Freedom of movement.; ID card valid. | |
| Slovenia | Visa not required | Freedom of movement.; ID card valid. | |
| Solomon Islands | Visa not required | 90 days | 90 days within any 180 day period. |
| Somalia | eVisa | | Available at Berbera, Borama, Burao, Erigavo and Hargeisa airports.; 30 days, available at Bosaso Airport, Galcaio Airport and Mogadishu Airport. |
| South Africa | Visa not required | 90 days | |
| South Sudan | eVisa | | Obtainable online.; Printed visa authorization must be presented at the time of travel. |
| Spain | Visa not required | Freedom of movement.; ID card valid. | |
| Sri Lanka | eVisa / Visa on arrival | 60 days / 30 days | Sri Lanka introduced an ETA valid for 30 days. |
| Sudan | Visa required | | |
| Suriname | Visa not required | 90 days | An entrance fee of USD 50 or EUR 50 must be paid online prior to arrival.; Multiple entry e-Visa is also available. |
| Sweden | Visa not required | (Nordic Passport Union): Freedom of movement.; Any travel document not required. | |
| Switzerland | Visa not required | Freedom of movement.; ID card valid. | |
| Syria | eVisa | | |
| Tajikistan | Visa not required | 30 days | Visa also available online.; e-Visa holders can enter through all border points. |
| Tanzania | eVisa / Visa on arrival | 90 days | |
| Thailand | Visa not required | 60 days | |
| Timor-Leste | Visa not required | 90 days | 90 days within any 180 day period. |
| Togo | eVisa | 15 days | |
| Tonga | Visa not required | 90 days | 90 days within any 180 day period. |
| Trinidad and Tobago | Visa not required | 90 days | 90 days within any 180 day period. |
| Tunisia | Visa not required | 3 months | ID card valid on organized tours. |
| Turkey | Visa not required | 3 months | |
| Turkmenistan | Visa required | | |
| Tuvalu | Visa not required | 90 days | |
| Uganda | eVisa | 3 months | |
| Ukraine | Visa not required | 90 days | 90 days within any 180 day period. |
| United Arab Emirates | Visa not required | 90 days | 90 days within any 180 day period. |
| United Kingdom | Electronic Travel Authorisation | 6 months | ETA required, valid for 2 years. |
| United States | Visa Waiver Program | 90 days | ESTA is valid for 2 years from the date of issuance.; ESTA is also required when entering the country by cruise ship or land.; A Form I-94 is required for entry into the United States by land. It carries a $30 fee and can be obtained either online or upon arrival.; Visa required for nationals of VWP countries who have travelled or been present in Iran, Iraq, Libya, North Korea, Somalia, Sudan, Syria or Yemen at any time on or after 1 March 2011 or Cuba at any time on or after 12 January 2021, or nationals of VWP countries who are also nationals of Iran, Iraq, North Korea, Sudan or Syria. Exceptions apply if the travel was in military or diplomatic service of the VWP country. |
| Uruguay | Visa not required | 90 days | |
| Uzbekistan | Visa not required | 30 days | |
| Vanuatu | Visa not required | 90 days | 90 days within any 180 day period. |
| Vatican City | Visa not required | | ID card valid. |
| Venezuela | Visa not required | 90 days | |
| Vietnam | Visa not required | 45 days | A multiple entry eVisa valid for 90 days is also available. |
| Yemen | Visa required | | |
| Zambia | Visa not required | 90 days | Also eligible for a universal visa allowing access to Zimbabwe. |
| Zimbabwe | Visa on arrival | 30 days | Also eligible for a universal visa allowing access to Zambia. |

== Territories and disputed areas ==
Visa requirements for Finnish citizens for visits to various territories, disputed areas, partially recognized countries and restricted zones:

Europe

- Abkhazia — Visa required.
- Mount Athos — Special permit required (4 days: 25 euro for Orthodox visitors, 35 euro for non-Orthodox visitors, 18 euro for students). There is a visitors' quota: maximum 100 Orthodox and 10 non-Orthodox per day and women are not allowed.
- (Belarus) Brest and Grodno — Visa not required for 10 days.
- Northern Cyprus — Visa free access for 3 months. Passport required.
- (United Nations) UN Buffer Zone in Cyprus — Access Permit is required for travelling inside the zone, except Civil Use Areas.
- Faroe Islands — Freedom of movement.
- Gibraltar — Visa not required.
- Guernsey – Visa not required.
  - Alderney – Visa not required.
  - Sark – Visa not required.
- Isle of Man — Visa not required.
- (Norway) Jan Mayen — permit issued by the local police required for staying for less than 24 hours and permit issued by the Norwegian police for staying for more than 24 hours.
- Jersey – Visa not required.
- Kosovo — visa free for 90 days.
- Closed cities and regions in Russia — special authorization required.
- South Ossetia — Visa free. Multiple entry visa to Russia and three-day prior notification are required to enter South Ossetia.
- Transnistria — Visa free. Registration required after 24h.

Africa

- Eritrea (outside Asmara) — visa covers Asmara only; to travel in the rest of the country, a Travel Permit for Foreigners is required (20 Eritrean nakfa).
- Sahrawi Arab Democratic Republic (Western Sahara controlled territory) — Visa not required up to 3 months.
- Somaliland — Visa issued on arrival (30 days for 30 US dollars, payable on arrival).
- Sudan — All foreigners traveling more than 25 kilometers outside of Khartoum must obtain a travel permit.
  - (Sudan) Darfur — Separate travel permit is required.

Asia

- (China) Hainan — Visa not required for 30 days for traveling as part of a tourist group from 21 countries
- Hong Kong — Visa not required for 90 days.
- India — Protected Area Permit (PAP) required for whole states of Nagaland and Sikkim and parts of states Manipur, Arunachal Pradesh, Uttaranchal, Jammu and Kashmir, Rajasthan, Himachal Pradesh. Restricted Area Permit (RAP) required for all of Andaman and Nicobar Islands and parts of Sikkim. Some of these requirements are occasionally lifted for a year.
- Iraqi Kurdistan — You can apply for an e-Visa (30 days) to visit the Iraqi Kurdistan Region.
- Kazakhstan — Special permission required for the town of Baikonur and surrounding areas in Kyzylorda Oblast, and the town of Gvardeyskiy near Almaty.
- (Iran) Kish Island — Visitors to Kish Island do not require a visa.
- Macao — Visa not required for 90 days.
- (Malaysia) Sabah and Sarawak — These states have their own immigration authorities and passport is required to travel to them, however the same visa applies.
- Maldives — With the exception of the capital Malé, tourists are generally prohibited from visiting non-resort islands without the express permission of the Government of Maldives.
- North Korea outside Pyongyang – People are not allowed to leave the capital city, tourists can only leave the capital with a governmental tourist guide (no independent moving)
- Palestine — Visa not required. Arrival by sea to Gaza Strip not allowed.
- Taiwan — Visa not required for 90 days.
- (Tajikistan) Gorno-Badakhshan Autonomous Province — OIVR permit required (15+5 Tajikistani Somoni) and another special permit (free of charge) is required for Lake Sarez.
- Turkmenistan — A special permit, issued prior to arrival by Ministry of Foreign Affairs, is required if visiting the following places: Atamurat, Cheleken, Dashoguz, Serakhs and Serhetabat.
- (China) Tibet Autonomous Region — Tibet Travel Permit required (10 US Dollars).
- (United Nations) Korean Demilitarized Zone — restricted zone.
- (United Nations) UNDOF Zone and Ghajar — restricted zones.
- (Vietnam) Phú Quốc — can visit without a visa for up to 30 days.
- Yemen — Special permission needed for travel outside Sanaa or Aden.

Caribbean and North Atlantic

- Anguilla — Visa not required for 3 months.
- Aruba — Visa not required for 30 days.
- (Netherlands) Bonaire, St. Eustatius and Saba — Visa not required for 3 months.
- Bermuda — Visa not required for 21 days (extendable).
- British Virgin Islands — Visa not required for 1 month (extendable).
- Cayman Islands — Visa not required for 6 months.
- Colombia — Visitors arriving at San Andrés and Leticia must buy tourist cards on arrival.
- Curaçao — Visa not required for 3 months.
- Montserrat — Visa not required for 6 months.
- Greenland — Freedom of movement.
- (Venezuela) Margarita Island — All visitors are fingerprinted.
- Puerto Rico — Visa not required under the Visa Waiver Program, for 90 days on arrival from overseas for 2 years. ESTA required.
- Saint Pierre and Miquelon — Visa not required for 30 days.
- Sint Maarten — Visa not required for 3 months.
- Turks and Caicos Islands — Visa not required for 90 days.
- U.S. Virgin Islands — Visa not required under the Visa Waiver Program, for 90 days on arrival from overseas for 2 years. ESTA required.

Oceania

- American Samoa — Electronic authorization for 30 days.
- (Australia) Ashmore and Cartier Islands — special authorization required.
- (France) Clipperton Island — special permit required.
- Cook Islands — Visa free access for 31 days.
- (Fiji) Lau Province — Special permission required.
- French Polynesia — Visa not required.
- Guam — Visa not required under the Visa Waiver Program, for 90 days on arrival from overseas for 2 years. ESTA required.
- New Caledonia — Visa not required for 3 months.
- Niue — Visa on arrival valid for 30 days is issued free of charge.
- Northern Mariana Islands — Visa not required.
- Pitcairn Islands — 14 days visa free and landing fee US$35 or tax of US$5 if not going ashore.
- Tokelau — Entry permit required.
- United States Minor Outlying Islands — special permits required for Baker Island, Howland Island, Jarvis Island, Johnston Atoll, Kingman Reef, Midway Atoll, Palmyra Atoll and Wake Island.
- Wallis and Futuna — Visa not required.

South Atlantic and Antarctica

- Falkland Islands — A visitor permit is normally issued as a stamp in the passport on arrival, The maximum validity period is 1 month.
- Saint Helena, Ascension and Tristan da Cunha
  - Ascension Island — e-Visa for 3 months within any year period.
  - Saint Helena — Entry Permit (£25) for 183 days is issued on arrival.
  - Tristan da Cunha — Permission to land required for 15/30 pounds sterling (yacht/ship passenger) for Tristan da Cunha Island or 20 pounds sterling for Gough Island, Inaccessible Island or Nightingale Islands.
- South Georgia and the South Sandwich Islands — Pre-arrival permit from the Commissioner required (72 hours/1 month for 110/160 pounds sterling).
- Antarctica and adjacent islands — special permits required for French Southern and Antarctic Lands, Argentine Antarctica, (Australia) Australian Antarctic Territory, (Antártica Chilena Province) Chilean Antarctic Territory, (Australia) Heard Island and McDonald Islands, (Norway) Peter I Island, (Norway) Queen Maud Land, (New Zealand) Ross Dependency.
- Arab League — Certain countries will deny access to holders of Israeli visas or passport stamps of Israel because of the Arab League boycott of Israel.

== Non-ordinary passports ==
Holders of various categories of official Finnish passports have additional visa-free access to the following countries:

- Kazakhstan(diplomatic passports)
- Pakistan(diplomatic or service passports)
- Russia(diplomatic passports)

Holders of diplomatic or service passports of any country have visa-free access to Cape Verde, Ethiopia, Mali and Zimbabwe.

== Right to consular protection in non-EU countries ==
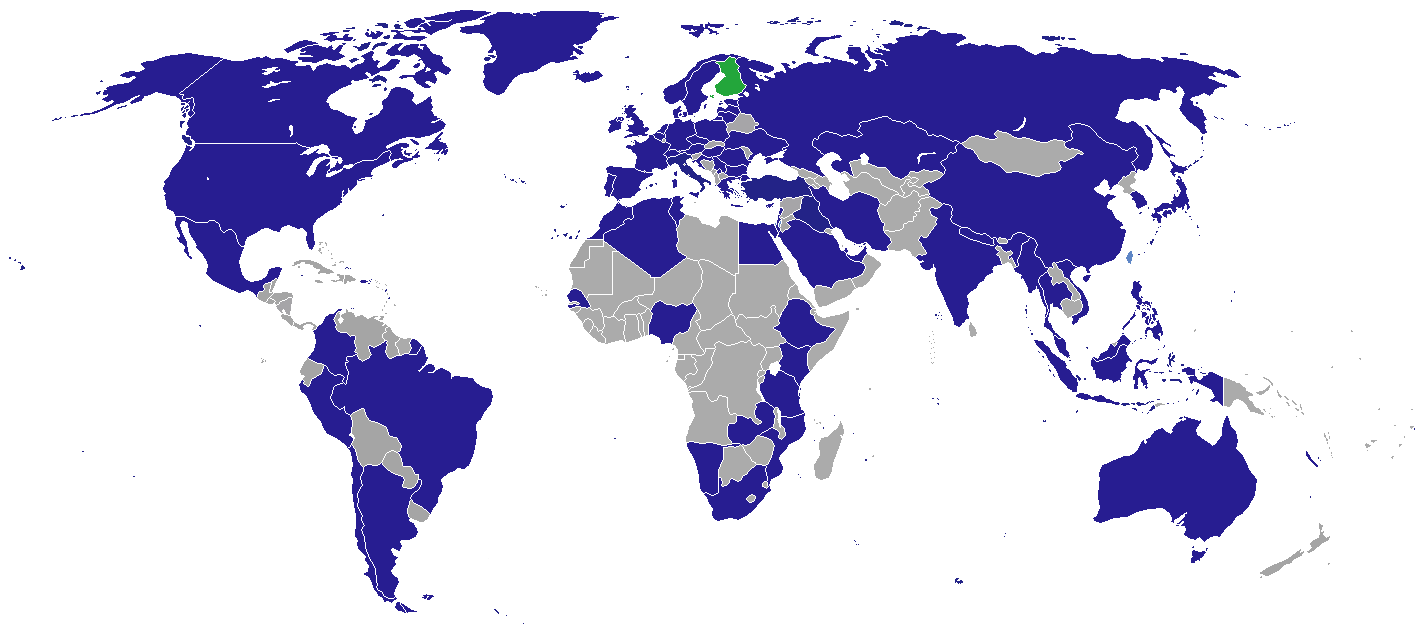
Diplomatic missions of Finland

When in a non-EU country where there is no Finnish embassy, Finnish citizens as EU citizens have the right to get consular protection from the embassy of any other EU country present in that country.

Finnish citizens may also seek assistance from public officials in the foreign services of any of the Nordic countries, when in a country with no Finnish representation. This is afforded by the Helsinki Treaty which states that public officials in the foreign services of any of the Nordic countries shall assist citizens of another Nordic country if that country is not represented in the territory concerned.

== See also ==
- Visa requirements for the European Union citizens
- Finnish passport
