= States News Service =

Defunct American news agency

- Type: News agency serving regional newspapers
- Predecessor: Connecticut News Service
- Founded: June 1973; 53 years ago
- Founders: Leland J. Schwartz and Howard Abramson
- Defunct: June 2004; 22 years ago
- Headquarters: 1331 Pennsylvania Ave., NW, Suite 524 North, Washington, D.C. 20004
- Area served: U.S.
- Products: The Latest News
- Services: Reportage, Document retrieval
- Owner: Leland J. Schwartz
- Number of employees: 40 (1993)
- Website: www.statesnews.com

States News Service was a news agency that operated from 1973 to 2004. Run by Leland J. Schwartz (b. 1949), the agency provided coverage of Washington, D.C., and the federal government for regional newspapers without their own D.C. bureaus. Later it expanded into the document retrieval business and an "hourly newspaper" called The Latest News.

== Overview and structure ==
States News Service's strategy was to concentrate on the local angles of national stories. Examples of these kinds of stories were described in a 1978 profile:

For instance, the C.I.A. program to test the behavior of people who had taken LSD was a national story, but the fact that part of it was undertaken at Rutgers University was the more important page one news for The Newark Star Ledger and The New Brunswick Home News.

The reporters keep in touch with staff members in various Federal agencies for news of interest to localities. In one case, a reporter learned from staff members at the Nuclear Regulatory Commission that a mysterious "green grunge" had developed in some nuclear plants, posing a potential danger of leakage of radioactive material. This made good copy in Connecticut, where two of these reactors are situated.

And while the closing of 14 rural post offices in the Erie, Pa., postal section did not make much of a national splash, it was front page news for the Erie Morning News.

States News Service was also valued for its coverage of local members of Congress, "their general performance and how they are voting. This is particularly important because many papers around the country have tended to take Congressional press releases ... and reprint them as news without doing any hard reporting on them."

In 1978, client papers were charged between "$75 to $300 a week, based on circulation and need." In 1993, States' rates were from $50 to $800 a week per client. In either case, this was much less expensive than the cost of a single salaried Washington-based reporter. Most States News Service reporters were "hungry" — just starting out in the field, and willing to work long hours. Subscribing newspaper editors were generally pleased with the coverage they got, though some complained about the fluctuating quality of the writing and reporting.

== History ==
=== Origins ===
States News Service was co-founded by Leland Schwartz, a native of Greenwich, Connecticut, and a former reporter for the New Haven Journal-Courier and a news assistant at The New York Times. In 1973, while serving as a press release writer on Capitol Hill for Connecticut Senator Lowell Weicker, he observed that Connecticut newspapers were routinely publishing his handouts as news stories without substantial alteration.

Disheartened by what he perceived as inadequate local coverage of congressional affairs, Schwartz resigned from his position and, with Howard Abramson, a friend from New Haven, established the Connecticut News Service. Operating from Schwartz's modest D.C. residence, equipped with two second-hand Senate desks, two phone lines, and a slow telecopier, they initially had only two clients — the New Haven Register and the Journal-Courier.

Their early endeavors included a significant story claiming that Connecticut Governor Thomas Meskill intended to resign and receive a federal bench appointment from President Richard Nixon. Despite Meskill's outright denial, the fledgling news service ran the story, resulting in widespread coverage in Connecticut. Although Meskill persistently refuted the allegations, he eventually did announce his decision not to seek another term, with Nixon nominating him for the judgeship shortly before resigning due to the Watergate scandal.

After purchasing his partner's stake, Schwartz expanded the service's reach by acquiring newspaper clients in New Jersey and Pennsylvania. With a staff of four, States News Service came into existence.

=== Success and growth ===
By 1978, States had ten full-time reporters and was expanding. For $1,300, Schwartz acquired a rival agency, the Capitol Hill News Service, an offshoot of Ralph Nader's think tank Public Citizen, which had five reporters. With the acquisition, States boasted a client list of 77 newspapers in nine states and a readership of 3.7 million — at that time more than the combined circulation of Gannett and Combined Communications.

=== Bankruptcy ===
By early 1982, States had 25 employees and was providing Washington coverage for about 80 newspapers. Despite this, and despite paying its writers extremely low rates (about $8,000 a year in 1978), States News Service was bankrupt: although it collected approximately $30,000 per month from client papers, the organization was spending more than $50,000 a month on payroll and other expenses. By that point, States was $700,000 in debt — "creditors include the Internal Revenue Service, the District government, and the telephone company," as well as Schwartz's own parents.

Schwartz had previously tried selling the business to such suitors as CBS, the Washington Post Co., and a group headed by Michael Mooney, then Washington editor of Harper's Magazine. A third of the staff quit during the bankruptcy.

=== Acquisition by SNS Ventures ===
In late February 1982, Schwartz sold States News Service to SNS Ventures, a joint venture of the Pulitzer Publishing Company and Information Technology Group, a division of the conglomerate Indian Head, Inc. Schwartz received $10,000 and relief from most of the organization's debts.

With the sale, Schwartz, who stayed on as chief editor, planned on expanding States' products into the information database business, eventually becoming "Washington's leading information source on how the cities, states, and specific industries are individually affected by the federal government." He imagined creating an "information bank" that could also "be sold to radio and television stations, cable systems, special interest magazines, and the government and corporate fields."

Despite Schwartz's ambitions for the agency, however, it continued to face numerous challenges: a union drive by reporters, the early 1980s recession, and losing $1,000 a day. In February 1983, SNS Ventures announced it was going to shut down States New Service while Schwartz looked for new buyers.

Again, most of the agency's staff left. But, as Howard Kurtz wrote about the agency in a 1993 magazine profile, "Schwartz hired new reporters and somehow kept the ship afloat. He had become quite accomplished at wheedling money out of newspaper editors with heartfelt appeals about the importance of localized Washington news."

=== New York Times Co. loan and The Latest News ===
In 1986, The New York Times Company loaned States News Service $1 million, enabling the agency to keep going. "But the 1990 recession knocked him for another loop. As editors tightened their belts, States lost 50 papers and $750,000 worth of business."

In 1990, Schwartz created The Latest News, a 12-20-page packet of information compiled hourly, in partnership with Financial World magazine and United Press International. With new information hourly, the packet was distributed to US Airways Shuttle passengers traveling between New York, Washington, D.C., and Boston. As described in a 1993 New York Times profile, The Latest News...

...promotes itself as the nation's first hourly newspaper. Assembled in Washington and sent by computer to local print sites, it comes out every hour, from 4 P.M. to 9 P.M.... The Latest News has established a modest niche by printing wire-service updates on national and international developments for people who, Mr. Schwartz said, are lost in the "news blackout" of business travel. Mr. Schwartz says the newspaper has made a modest amount of money with advertisers like BMW and others that aim at the affluent audience of 5,000 shuttle customers daily.

By 1993, the agency was on more solid ground financially, in large part thanks to its database business. With 15 employees recording U.S. Securities and Exchange Commission transactions or writing briefs on Capitol Hill markups, States sold information to newspapers, lobbyists, and corporations. Furthermore, The New York Times Co. had forgiven the balance of its $1 million loan in exchange for free use of States stories on the Times' wire service.

=== Closure ===
In January 2003, the Internal Revenue Service filed three liens against States News Service, claiming that States owed nearly $300,000 in back income and employment taxes dating back to December 1998. Schwartz announced that he was considering selling the service's document retrieval service and The Latest News.

By May 2003, States had only three full-time reporters; down from 40 a decade earlier.

The States News Service closed in June 2004. (A later program organized by C-SPAN under that name appears to bear no connection to Leland Schwartz's news agency.)

== Later Schwartz activities ==
In 2013, Schwartz and former NPR president Frank Mankiewicz introduced a new wrinkle on Schwartz' The Latest News. Forming the startup PrintSignal Corporation, the service printed the "latest news" (downloaded from the Associated Press) on the backs of restaurant receipts ("taking advantage of the 'virtual news blackout' when diners (hopefully) stop using their mobile device").

== Legacy ==
In 2009, American Journalism Review lamented the lack of coverage of the federal government from a local angle, specifically mentioning the States News Service as a previous example of that practice:

The now-defunct States News Service once filled the gap for many papers, which could pay a fee to buy all or part of a reporter's time. Working directly with the clients, States reporters covered Washington developments for newspapers around the country. "It used to be if we closed this bureau, San Diego would have that option of having somebody from States watch them, but that's not there anymore," [the Copley News Service's George] Condon says.

== Notable former States staff members ==
- Julia Angwin, early 1990s
- Naftali Bendavid, late 1980s
- John Ellement, early 1980s
- John Helyar, late 1970s
- Michael Isikoff, late 1970s
- Josh Meyer, late 1980s
- Liza Mundy
- David Phinney
- Deb Price
- Lois Romano
- Brigid Schulte
- Bob Rast, late 1970s
- Sam Smith, late 1970s (also served as managing editor)
- Sharon Waxman, early 1990s
- Gary Weiss, early 1980s
- Kenneth R. Weiss, early 1980s
