= Phinney =

Phinney is a surname. Notable people with the surname include:

- Archie Phinney (1904–1949), Nez Perce anthropologist
- Beth Phinney (born 1938), Canadian politician
- Connie Carpenter-Phinney (born 1957), American racing cyclist and speed skater, married to Davis, mother of Taylor
- David Phinney, American journalist and broadcaster
- Davis Phinney (born 1959), American racing cyclist, married to Connie, father of Taylor
- Elihu Phinney (1755–1813), American printer
- Guy Carleton Phinney (1851–1893), American real estate developer
- Leslie Phinney, American thermal engineer
- Taylor Phinney (born 1990), American racing cyclist, son of Connie and Davis

== See also ==
- Phinney Ridge, Seattle, Washington
- Finney (disambiguation)
- Finnie, a surname
