= Charles Finney (disambiguation) =

Charles Finney often refers to Charles Grandison Finney (1792–1875), American Presbyterian minister.

Charles Finney may also refer to:

- Bill Finney (Charles William Thomas Finney, born 1931), English footballer
- Charles G. Finney (1905–1984), American newspaperman and writer, descendant of Charles Grandison Finney
- Charlie Finney (born 2003), English footballer

== See also ==
- Finney (surname)
