= Deb Price =

American journalist (1958–2020)

- Deb Price in 2001
- Born: February 27, 1958; Lubbock, Texas, U.S.
- Died: November 20, 2020 (aged 62); Hong Kong
- Education: Stanford University (BA, MA)
- Known for: LGBTQ+ focused journalism
- Awards: Lambda Literary Award (2001); National Lesbian and Gay Journalists Association Hall of Fame (2009)

Deborah Jane Price (February 27, 1958 – November 20, 2020) was an American journalist, author, and pioneering lesbian columnist. A pioneer in representing LGBTQ+ issues in mainstream media, she was the first nationally syndicated columnist on the topic. She won a Lambda Literary Award for her book Courting Justice and was inducted into the National Lesbian and Gay Journalists Association's Hall of Fame in 2009.

== Early life ==
Price was born in Lubbock, Texas, on February 27, 1958, to Mary Jane (née Caldwell) and Allen Palmer Price. Her father was an Episcopal priest, and her mother was a receptionist with a law firm. Her early years were spent in Texas and Colorado until her parents divorced when she was 15. She and her mother moved to Bethesda, Maryland, where she graduated from the National Cathedral School. She started her college at University of Michigan, Ann Arbor, before transferring to Stanford University, earning bachelor's and master's degrees in English literature in 1981.

== Career ==
Price started her career with the Northern Virginia Sun and the news agency States News Service, which provided syndicated news coverage of Washington for papers across the country. She went on to join The Washington Post in 1984 as an editor with the national desk, where she would meet her future partner Joyce Murdoch. She later joined the Washington bureau of The Detroit News.

Her debut column in The Detroit News in 1992 was the first syndicated national column in mainstream media that spoke about gay life. The column was syndicated by agencies including The Los Angeles Times Syndicate and Gannett. Through her columns, Price sought to demystify perceptions about gay life, trying to portray same-sex couples in everyday scenarios. In her career over 18 years, she would write over 900 columns and help shape cultural attitudes and perceptions. In addition to covering everyday topics, she also took on pointed issues including gay members in the military. Writing about her contributions, The New York Times said that her efforts were key in reversal of cultural attitudes about gay life and culminated in 2015 with the legalization of same-sex marriage.

Her first book, And Say Hi to Joyce: America's First Gay Column Comes Out (1995), co-written with her partner Joyce Murdoch, was a compilation of her columns. Her second book, Courting Justice: Gay Men and Lesbians v. the Supreme Court (2001), which she also co-wrote with Murdoch, won the Lambda Literary Award for 2001 and was considered a "crackerjack resource volume on gay legal history". The book dealt with the history of the Supreme Court of the United States's handling of gay rights cases over a 50-year period.

She went to Harvard University as a Nieman journalism fellow in 2011, after which she and Murdoch moved to Hong Kong, where Murdoch took an academic job. Price shifted focus to business media and went on to work for The Asian Wall Street Journal. She also served as managing editor for Beijing-based financial media house Caixin Global and was also the business editor for Hong Kong-based The South China Morning Post.

She was the recipient of the GLAAD Media Award for her coverage of LGBTQ+ issues in mainstream media. She was also inducted into the National Lesbian and Gay Journalists Association's Hall of Fame in 2009.

== Personal life ==
Price met her partner Joyce Murdoch, then a fellow editor at the national desk of The Washington Post, in 1984. While they became a couple in 1985, they were able to register as domestic partners only in 1993, in Takoma Park, Maryland. In 2000 they entered a civil union in Vermont and in 2003 married in Toronto. Theirs was the first same-sex wedding announcement on the Post's weddings page. Until then, the paper had published its same-sex union messages in a page titled "Celebrations" instead of the weddings page. This publishing was one of the first same-sex wedding announcements in a major national newspaper.

Price died on November 20, 2020, from interstitial pneumonitis in a hospital in Hong Kong at the age of 62. She had had a rare autoimmune lung disease that she contracted in 2011.

== Selected works ==
- Price, Deb; Murdoch, Joyce (1995). And Say Hi to Joyce: America's First Gay Column Comes Out. New York: Doubleday. ISBN 9780385473651. OCLC 31646321.
- Murdoch, Joyce; Price, Deb (2001). Courting Justice: Gay Men and Lesbians v. the Supreme Court. New York: Basic Books. ISBN 9780786730940. OCLC 655054832.
