= Alex Finney =

Alex Finney may refer to:

- Alex Finney (footballer, born 1996), English footballer
- Alex Finney (footballer, born 1902) (1902–1982), English footballer

== See also ==
- Finney (surname)
