= Hal Finney =

Hal Finney may refer to:

- Hal Finney (baseball) (1905–1991), American baseball player
- Hal Finney (computer scientist) (1956–2014), American game developer and cryptographer

== See also ==
- Finney (surname)
