= James Finney =

James Finney may refer to:

- Jim Finney (1924–2008), English football referee
- James Finney (swimmer) (1862–?), English swimmer in the 1880s

== See also ==
- Finney (surname)
