= Finnish passport =

Travel document

Finnish passport Suomen passi finskt pass
- Front Cover of Finnish passport (2023), Åland variant

- The data page of a contemporary Finnish biometric passport
- Type: Passport
- Issued by: Police of Finland
- First issued: 1996 (first machine-readable EU design); 21 August 2006 (first biometric version); 1 January 2017 (second biometric version); 13 March 2023 (current version)
- Purpose: Identification
- Eligibility: Finnish citizenship
- Expiration: 5 years after issuance
- Cost: Regular application – €50; Online application – €44; Veteran application – €25; Veteran online application – €22; Embassy application – €235

The Finnish passport (Suomen passi; finskt pass) is issued to Finnish nationals for international travel. In addition to proving Finnish nationality, it allows holders to seek assistance from Finnish consular officials abroad, or from other EU or Nordic missions when a Finnish official is unavailable.

Finnish passports share the standardised burgundy cover and layout common to EU member states. Passports are issued by the local police or by authorised Finnish diplomatic missions abroad.

As EU citizens, Finnish nationals enjoy free movement and residence rights in the European Union, the European Economic Area, and Switzerland. In addition, under the Nordic Passport Union, citizens may travel between Nordic countries without identity documents. Finnish men under the age of 30 who are liable for military service but have not yet completed it may only receive passports valid until the last legal start date for service (age 28).

Finnish passports are produced and personalised by Thales Group.

== Physical appearance ==
Since 1996, Finnish passports have had burgundy covers and follow the standard European Union passport layout, with the Finnish coat of arms displayed in the centre of the front cover. Above the coat of arms appear the words Euroopan unioni (Finnish) and Europeiska unionen (Swedish), meaning "European Union." Below are the words Suomi – Finland, the country's name in Finnish and Swedish, and Passi – Pass, meaning "Passport."

Passports issued before August 2006 were not biometric. In those versions, all words on the cover were printed in capital letters.

On 21 August 2006 Finland introduced biometric passports, which included the standard biometric symbol at the top of the cover.

In 2012 the coat of arms was enlarged. The European Union title was moved below it, separated from the country's name by a double line, and the country's name began to appear in all capitals. The biometric symbol was shifted to the bottom.

The inside pages also feature animated flipbook-style designs: the 2006 version showed a moose in motion, the 2017 version a flying swan, and the 2023 version a seal. The latest version also has a snowflake motif embossed on the cover.

== Visa requirements ==
Visa requirements for Finnish citizens Finland Full freedom of movement (Nordic passport union) Freedom of movement Visa not required / ESTA / eTA / eVisitor Visa on arrival eVisa Visa available both on arrival or online Visa required prior to arrival

In 2022, Finnish citizens had visa-free or visa on arrival access to 189 countries and territories, ranking the Finnish passport third in the world (tied with Italian and Luxembourgish passports) according to the Henley Passport Index. Additionally, Arton Capital's Passport Index ranked the Finnish passport second in the world, with a visa-free score of 172 (tied with Austrian, Dutch, French, German, Italian, Luxembourgish, Spanish, Swedish, Swiss, and United States passports), as of 19 September 2022.

As a member state of the European Union, Finnish citizens enjoy freedom of movement within the European Economic Area (EEA). The Citizens’ Rights Directive defines the right of free movement for citizens of the EEA. Through bilateral agreements freedom of movement is extended to Switzerland, and all EU and EFTA nationals are not only visa-exempt but are legally entitled to enter and reside in each other's countries.

== Different spellings of the same name ==
Names that contain special letters (ä, ö, å) are written with those letters in the non-machine-readable zone. In the machine-readable zone, they are converted into letter combinations according to international standards:

- ä → AE
- ö → OE
- å → AA

For example:

- Hämäläinen → HAEMAELAEINEN

== History ==
Finnish passports issued from the 1930s until the 1970s had a white paper cover with the bearer's photograph and the seal of the province where the bearer applied for his or her passport affixed on the back cover. Those issued from the 1970s until the adoption of the EU design in 1996 had a dark blue leather cover and did not contain the "European Union" texts, but were otherwise broadly similar in appearance. Previously, children could be included in the parents' passport, but this is no longer allowed and children must be issued their own passport, regardless of age.

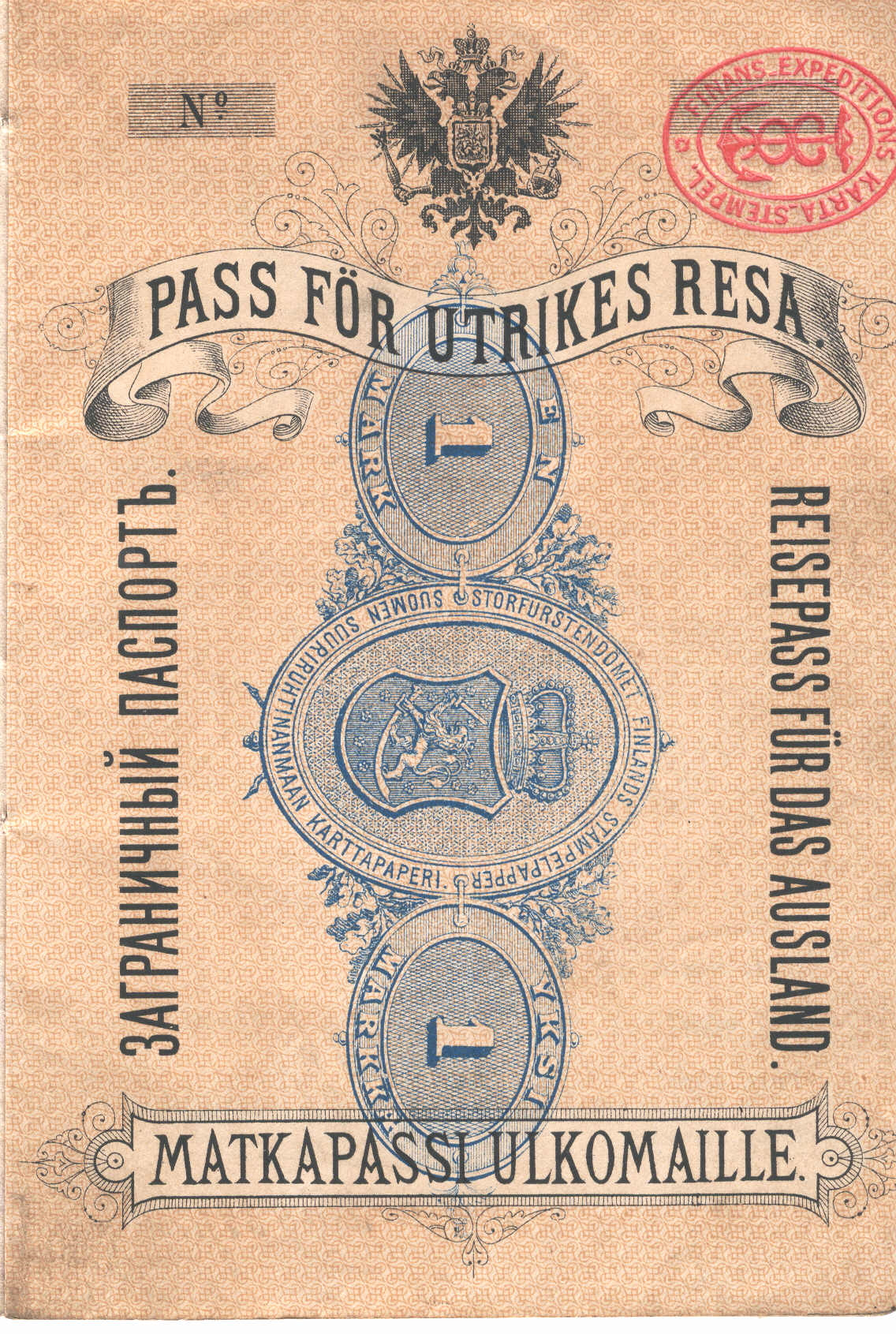
International passport of the Grand Duchy of Finland (about 1890)

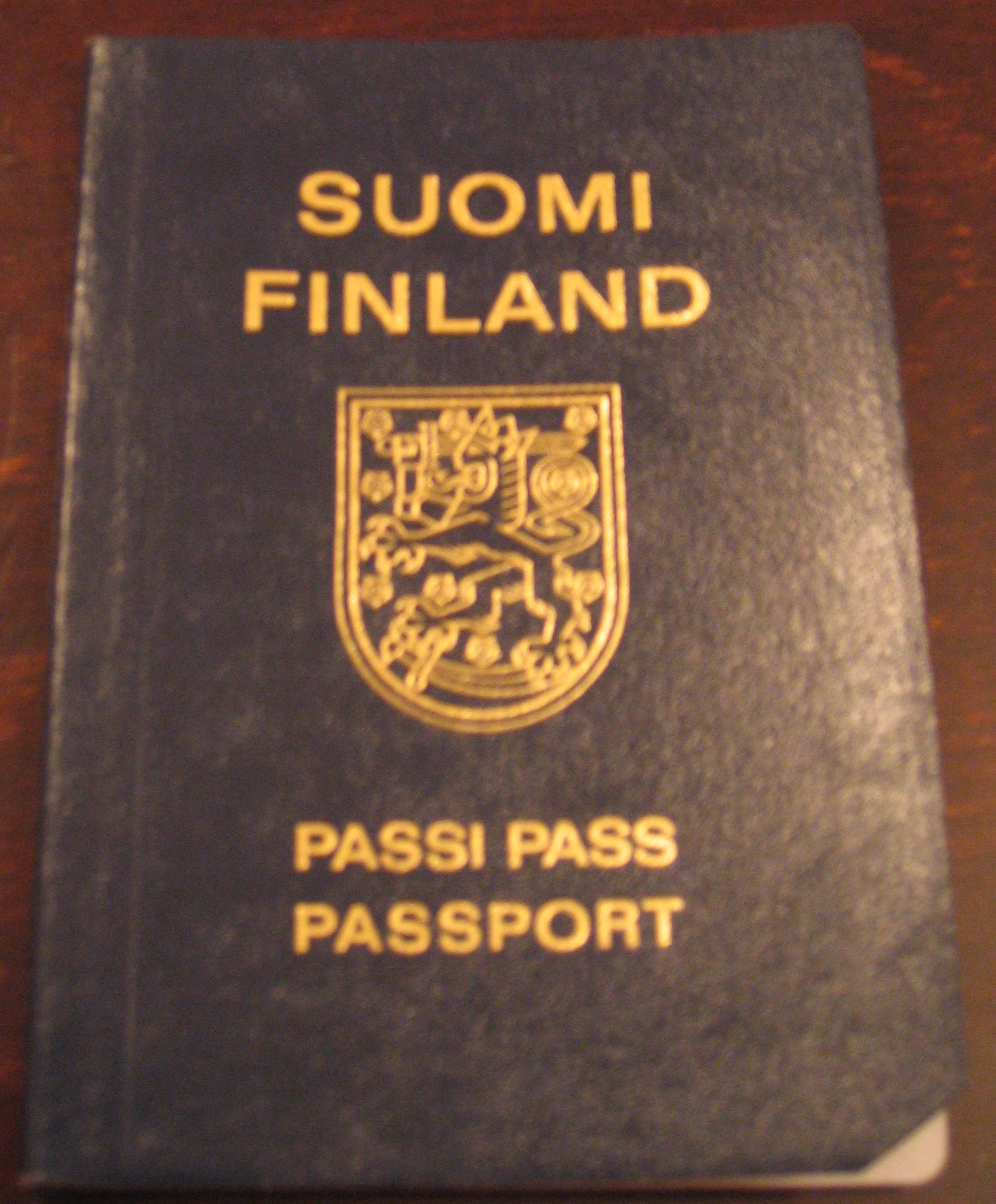
Front cover of a pre-1996 Finnish passport

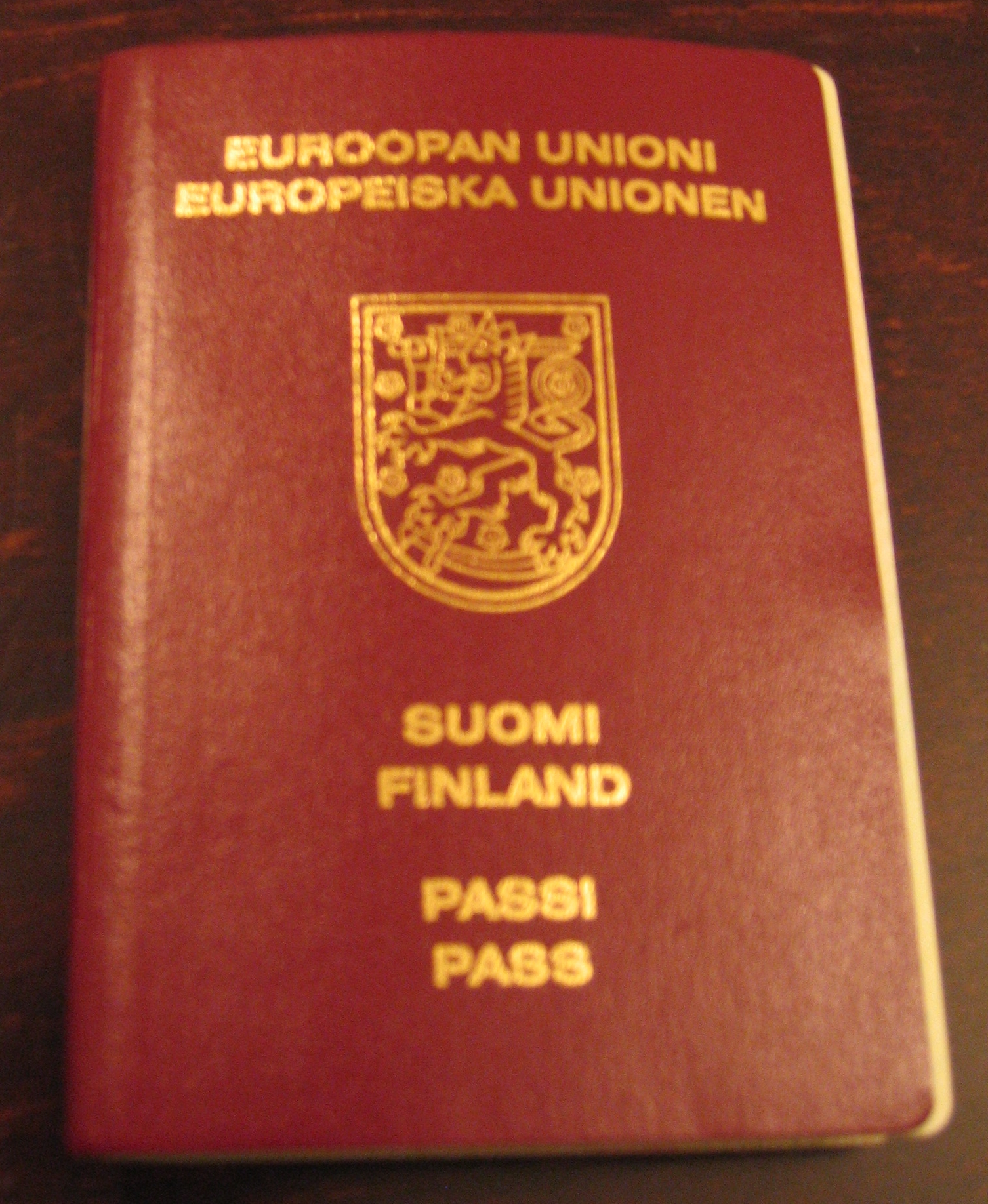
Front cover of a 1996–2006 EU-format machine-readable, non-biometric Finnish passport

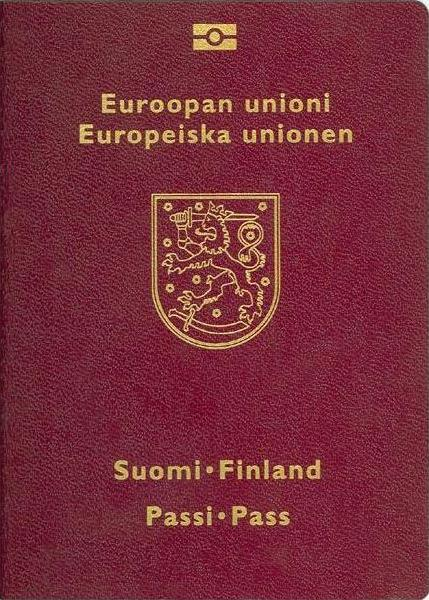
Front cover of a 2006–2012 biometric Finnish passport

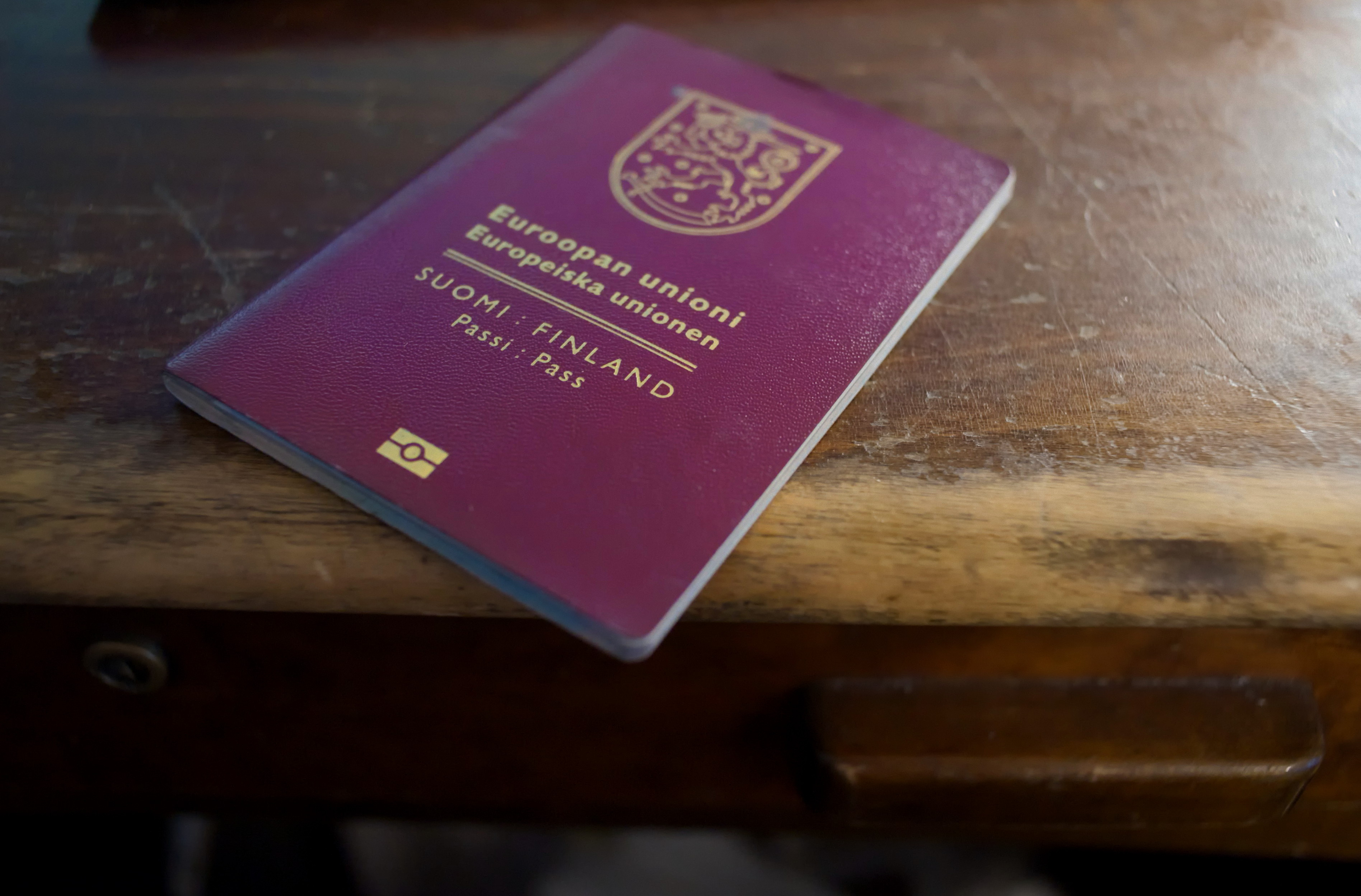
Front cover of a 2012–2016 biometric Finnish passport

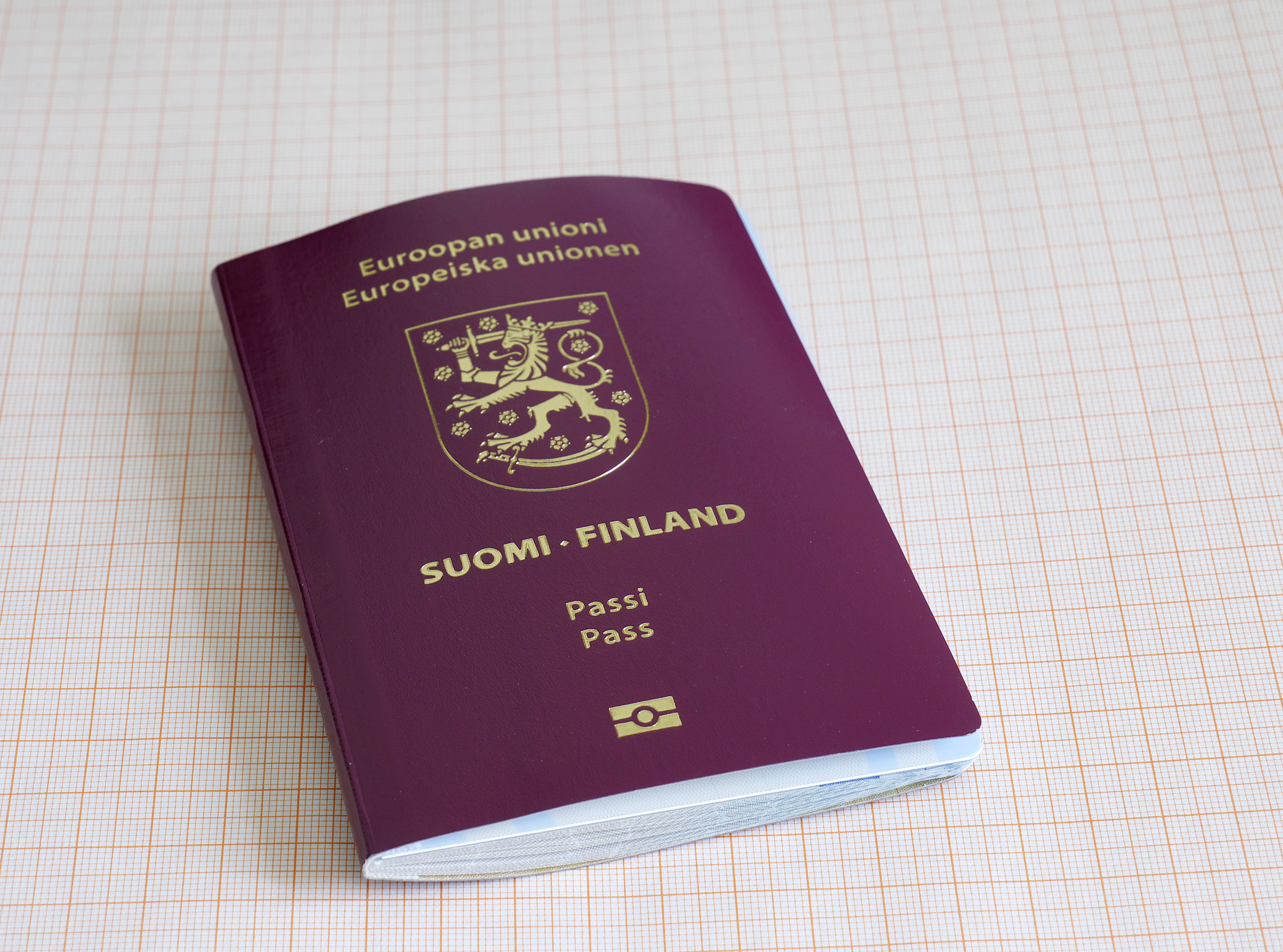
Front cover of a 2017–2023 biometric Finnish passport

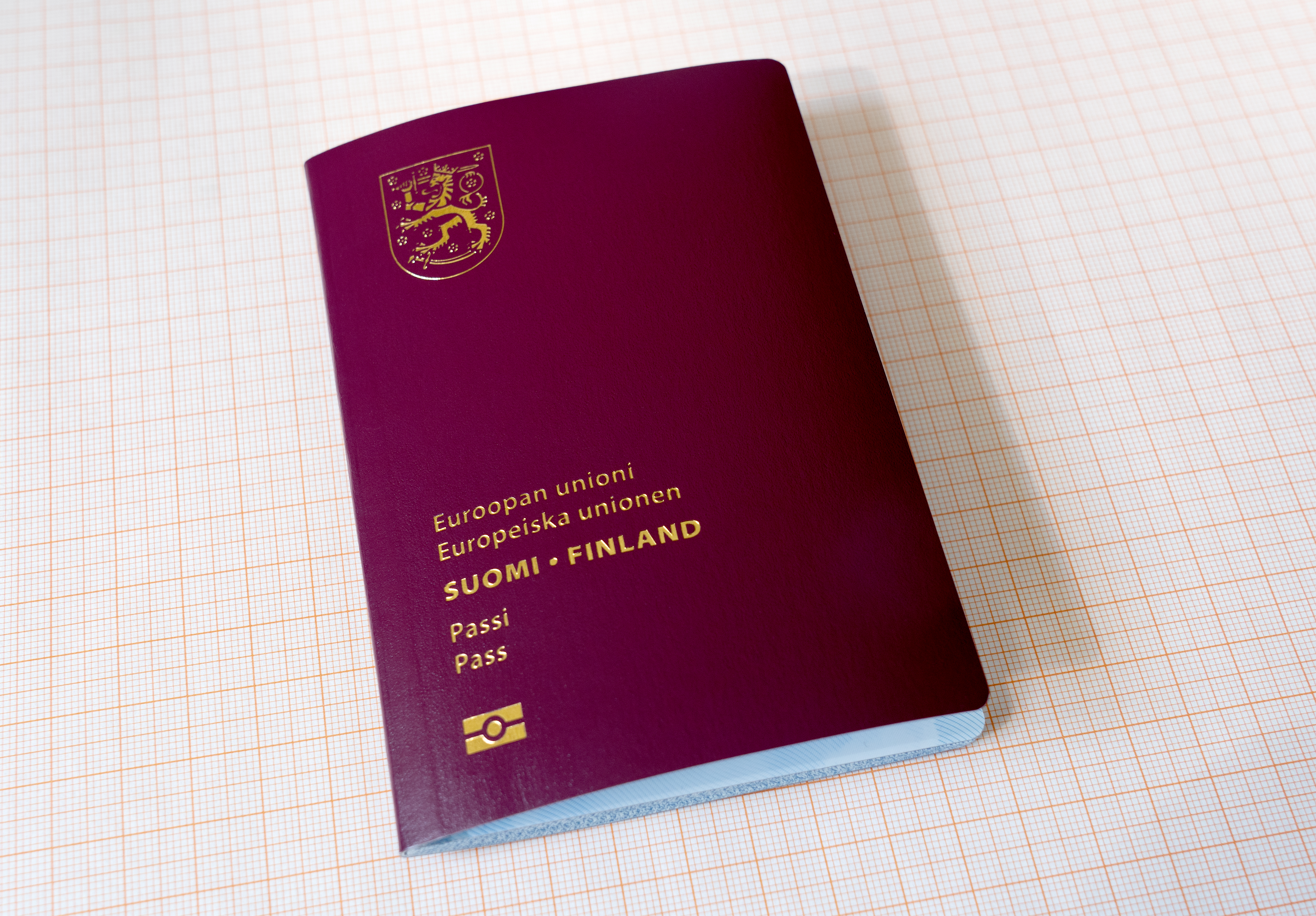
Front cover of a 2023–present biometric Finnish passport

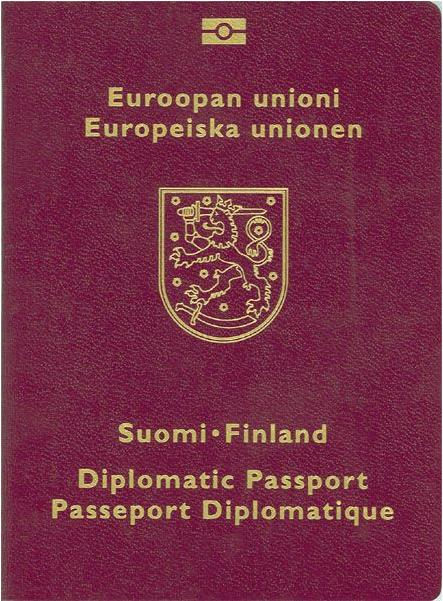
Front cover of a 2006–2012 biometric diplomatic passport

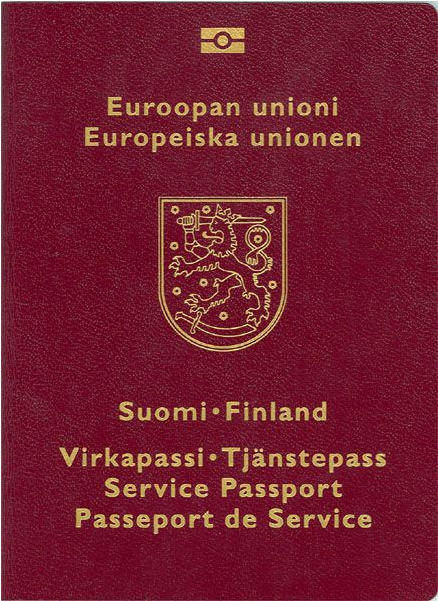
Front cover of a 2006–2012 biometric service passport

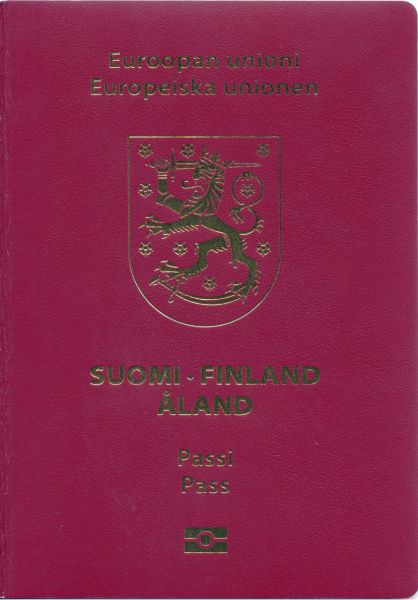
2018–2023 series passport issued to residents of Åland

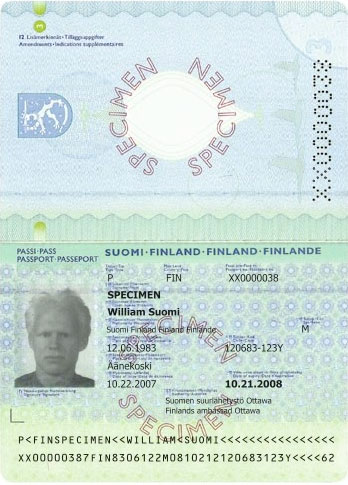
Current-type passport without an RFID chip (only issued at Finnish embassies abroad)

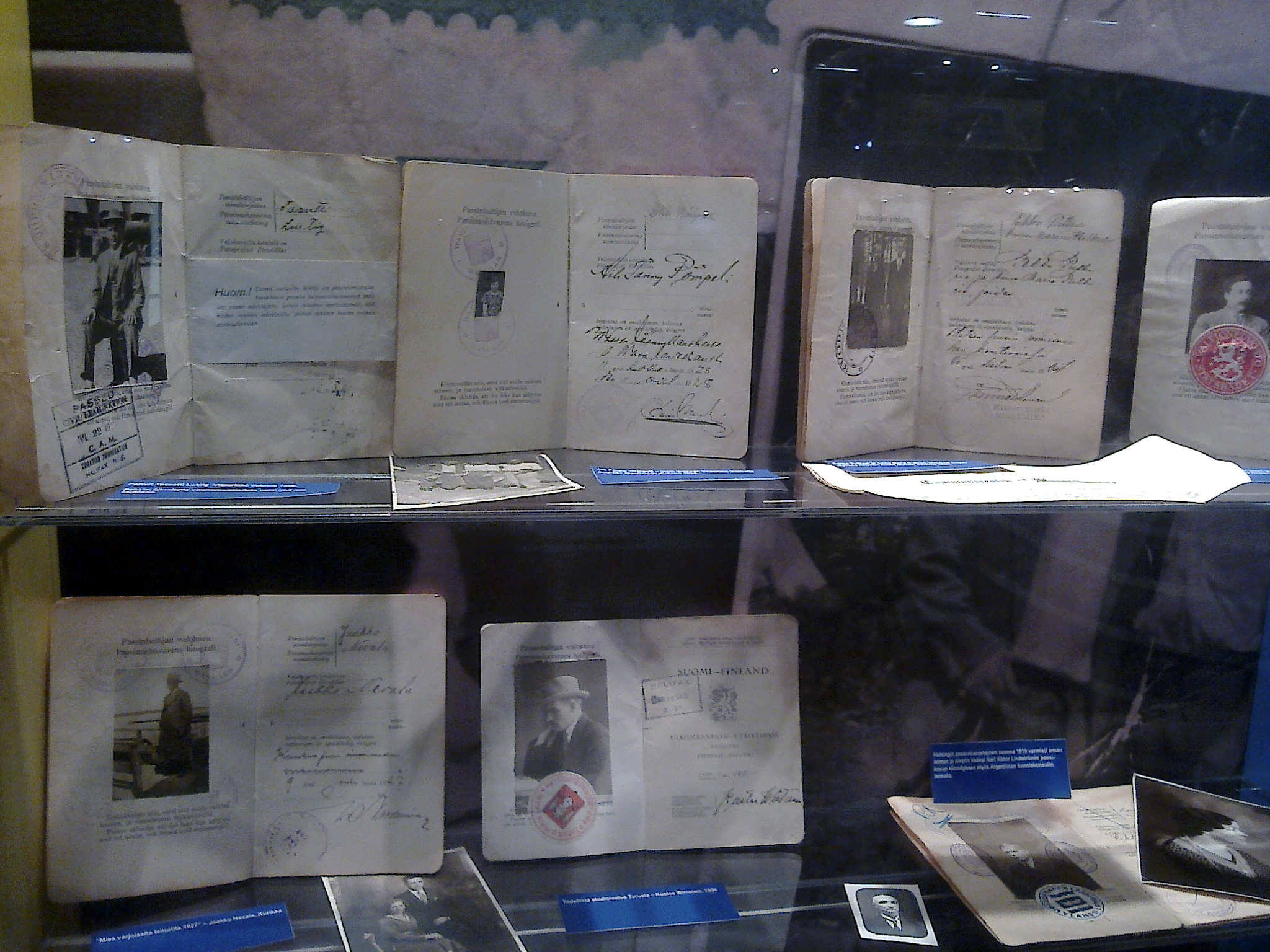
Collection of old Finnish passports displayed by the Ministry of Foreign Affairs

== Åland ==
Åland, an autonomous region with its own government, has a separate passport. The Åland Islands passport does not however indicate a different nationality, with all holders being Finnish citizens. Unlike the Danish autonomous countries (none of which belong to the European Union) the Åland Islands autonomous region is a full part of the Finnish state, and an Åland Islands passport therefore brings all the rights and benefits of European Union membership for the holder. The passport follows the standard European Union format, and is marked on the front cover with both Finland and Åland.

== See also ==
- Visa requirements for Finnish citizens
- Passports of the European Union
