= Finnie (surname) =

Finnie is a surname of Scottish origin which means "sincere."

Notable people with the surname include:

- Dave Finnie, Canadian ice hockey goaltender
- Emmitt Finnie, Canadian ice hockey player
- Ethel Finnie, American classic female blues singer
- John Finnie, Scottish politician
- Linda Finnie, a Scottish mezzo-soprano
- Roger Finnie, an American football offensive tackle
- Ross Finnie, Scottish politician
- Stephen Finnie, Scottish football referee
- Thomas Finnie, first Director of Management and Technology for the Defense Mapping Agency
- William Finnie (mayor), 18th-century mayor of Williamsburg, Virginia
- William Finnie (MP), Scottish liberal politician and member of parliament

== See also ==
- Feeney, a surname
- Phinney, a surname
