= Michael Finney =

Michael Finney may refer to:

- Michael Finney (magician) (born 1954), American magician
- Michael Finney (journalist), American news presenter and talk show host

== See also ==
- Finney (surname)
