= David Finney =

David Finney may refer to:

- D. J. Finney (David John Finney, 1917–2018), British statistician
- Dave Finney (David Ray Finney, 1933–2022), American lawyer and politician in Texas
- David Wesley Finney (1839–1916), Lieutenant Governor of Kansas

== See also ==
- Finney (surname)
