= Feeney =

Feeney is an Irish surname deriving from O'Feinneadha. Notable people with the surname include:

- Adam Feeney, Australian tennis player
- Adam King Feeney, Canadian record producer and disc jockey known professionally as Frank Dukes
- Angela Feeney, Northern Irish singer
- Anne Feeney, American musician
- Blair Feeney, New Zealand rugby union player
- Carol Feeney, American rower
- Chub Feeney, baseball administrator
- Charles F. "Chuck" Feeney, billionaire businessman
- Dan Feeney, American football player
- David Feeney, Australian politician
- Denis Feeney, Princeton academic
- F. X. Feeney, American writer and filmmaker
- Geraldine Feeney, Irish politician
- Helen M. Feeney, American nun
- Hugh Feeney, Irish bomber
- Jamie Feeney, Australian rugby league player
- Jim Feeney, Northern Irish footballer
- Joe Feeney, singer
- Joel Feeney, Canadian singer
- John Feeney (disambiguation)
- Josephine Feeney, British children's author
- Julie Feeney, Irish musician
- Kevin Feeney (1952–2013), Irish judge
- Lee Feeney, Northern Irish footballer
- Leonard Feeney, Jesuit priest, founder of Feeneyism
- Lexie Feeney, Australian archer
- Liam Feeney (born 1987), English footballer
- Mark Feeney, Pulitzer prize winner
- Michael Feeney (schoolteacher), associate of Nora Barnacle
- Michael Feeney (MBE), founder of the Mayo Peace Park
- Michael Feeney, the defendant in the case R. v. Feeney
- Nell Feeney, Australian actress
- Patrick Feeney (born 1991), American sprinter
- Thomas John Feeney, American Roman Catholic bishop
- Tom Feeney, Floridian politician
- Tom Feeney, Irish hurler
- Travis Feeney, American football player
- Vinny Feeney, Irish boxer
- Warren Feeney, Northern Irish footballer

== See also ==
- Mel B. Feany, American neuropathologist
- Finney (disambiguation)
