= John Feeney =

John Feeney may refer to:

- John Frederick Feeney (1807–1869), newspaper proprietor and father of John Feeney (1839–1905)
- John Feeney (newspaper proprietor) (1839–1905), newspaper proprietor and philanthropist of Birmingham
- John Martin Feeney, better known as John Ford (1894–1973), American film director and producer
- John Feeney (tenor) (1903–1967), Irish tenor
- John Feeney (filmmaker) (1922–2006), New Zealand director of documentary films
- John Feeney (boxer) (born 1958), British boxer, national bantamweight champion 1981–1983, 1983–1985
