= Thomas Finney (lawyer) =

American lawyer

Thomas D. Finney January 20, 1925 – January 30, 1978) was a lawyer and political strategist.

He was born in Oklahoma, and died from ALS. During his career he worked with Clark Clifford, Senators Adlai Stevenson, Eugene McCarthy, A. S. Michael Monroney, Edmund Muskie and President Lyndon B. Johnson.

Senator Edmund Muskie said "Tom Finney's death took from us a man who helped shape the history of our time. He is not a familiar name to most Americans. But it is to most of us [the US Senate]. ...it is people like Tom Finney who prove that public recognition is not the same as public service."^{1} In his memorial service remarks, Senator Adlai Stevenson said, "Tom Finney required little of life for himself. He claimed little of the influence that was his in Washington. He aided just causes; often they were forlorn. He aided friends in need."^{2}

His father, Tom Finney Sr practiced law in Idabel, Oklahoma until his death in 1968 from cancer.
