= Ken Finney =

English footballer (1929–2018)

Personal information
- Full name: Richard Kenneth Finney
- Date of birth: 10 March 1929
- Place of birth: St Helens, England
- Date of death: 7 July 2018 (aged 89)
- Place of death: Warrington, Cheshire, England
- Position: Winger

Youth career
- St Helens Town

Senior career*
Years	Team	Apps	(Gls)
1947–58	Stockport County	191	(33)
1958–63	Tranmere Rovers	180	(27)
1963–	Altrincham		
Total		371	(60)
- * Club domestic league appearances and goals

Richard Kenneth Finney (10 March 1929 – 7 July 2018) was an English footballer who played as winger for Stockport County and Tranmere Rovers. Finney ended his career with Altrincham, where he was described as "a very likeable character who delights in poaching a goal".
