= William Finney =

Welsh cricketer

Personal information
- Full name: William Finney
- Born: 13 August 1866; Newtown, Montgomeryshire, Wales
- Died: 8 May 1927 (aged 60); Stamford, Lincolnshire, England
- Batting: Right-handed
- Bowling: Right-arm slow Right-arm medium-fast

Domestic team information
- Years: Team
- 1894: Leicestershire

Career statistics
Competition	First-class
Matches	3
Runs scored	29
Batting average	7.25
100s/50s	–/–
Top score	14*
Balls bowled	180
Wickets	3
Bowling average	41.00
5 wickets in innings	–
10 wickets in match	–
Best bowling	1/7
Catches/stumpings	–/–
- Source: Cricinfo, 20 January 2013

William Finney (13 August 1866 – 8 May 1927) was a Welsh cricketer. Finney was a right-handed batsman who bowled both right-arm slow and right-arm medium-fast. He was born at Newtown, Montgomeryshire.

Finney made his first-class debut for Leicestershire in the counties' inaugural first-class fixture against Essex in 1894 at the County Ground, Leyton. He made two further first-class appearances for Leicestershire in 1894, against Yorkshire and the Marylebone Cricket Club. In his three matches, he scored a total of 29 runs at an average of 7.25, with a high score of 14 not out, while with the ball he took a single wicket.

He died at Stamford, Lincolnshire on 8 May 1927.
