= Tail fin =

Tail fin or tailfin may refer to:

- Car tailfin of an automobile
- Caudal fin of a fish
- Vertical stabilizer of an airplane
