= Thomas Finnie =

American governmental official

Thomas Carroll Finnie

Technical Director of the Aeronautical Chart and Information Center

Director of Management and Technology for the Defense Mapping Agency

Personal details
- Born: November 25, 1918 Caseyville, Kentucky
- Died: October 17, 2003 (aged 84) Webster Groves, Missouri
- Spouse: Evelyn Warren (m. 1940)

Military service
- Allegiance: United States
- Branch/service: United States Army
- Years of service: 1944–1945
- Commands: 66th Engineer Topographic Company

Thomas C. Finnie (November 25, 1918 – October 17, 2003) was the first Director of Management and Technology for the Defense Mapping Agency. He was one of the initial eight Department of Defense planners who helped organize the agency. Finnie was working in mission control during the 1969 Moon landing of Apollo 11.

== Early life and education ==
Finnie was born in Caseyville, Kentucky, son of Carroll Finnie, and Virginia Kellen. He earned a Bachelors in Science specializing in civil engineering from the University of Kentucky, and a Masters in Science specializing in business administration from George Washington University.

== Military service ==
Finnie enlisted in the Army on April 8, 1944. He commanded the 66th Engineer Topographic Company during several of its Pacific campaigns.

== Government service ==
In July 1937, he started working with the Department of Agriculture. In 1953, he took the position of Chief of the production and distribution plant of the Aeronautical Chart and Information Center. He became Technical Director of the ACIC in 1962, and held that position until 1972. Finnie then became the first Director of Management and Technology for the Defense Mapping Agency, until his retirement from the federal government in 1974.

== Personal life ==
Thomas married Evelyn Warren in Roane County, Tennessee, on July 20, 1940, and had two sons, Thomas and William.

== Honors ==
In 2001, Finnie was inducted in the National Imagery and Mapping Agency's hall of fame. In 2014, the U.S. Geospatial Intelligence Foundation renamed its lifetime achievement award, the Arthur C. Lundahl—Thomas C. Finnie Lifetime Achievement Award.

== Posthumous donation of private collection to NGA ==
Finnie's son William donated Finnie's collection of 30 artifacts, including 23 photos from the Moon landings that NASA gave to Finnie in honor of the assistance his agencies gave to the landings, to the National Geospatial-Intelligence Agency.

== Ancestry ==
Ancestors of Thomas Finnie

16. Thomas Lightfoot Finnie (1809–)
8. George Henry Finnie (1839–1925)
17. Malinda Eleanor Threlkeld (1809–1861)
4. Thomas Reese Finnie (1864–1944)
18. Thomas Reese
9. Margaret Reese (c. 1847)
19. Margaret Reynold
2. Carroll Finnie (1893–1980)
20. Alfred Moore (1805–1871)
10. William B Moore (1845–1927)
21. Margaret S Carrick (1806–1876)
5. Margaret Melvina Moore (1869–1963)
22. John D Gregory (1809–1869)
11. Orlenia M Gregory (1853–1878)
23. Melvina Jacobs (1820–1869)
1. Thomas Finnie
24. John Kellen
12. William Ennis Kellen (1827–1878)
25. Polly
6. Thomas Joseph Kellen (1855–1944)
26. Minor John Griggs (1798–1872)
13. Charity Ann Griggs (1835–1903)
27. Nancy Culver (1802–1886)
3. Virginia Evelyn Kellen (1895–1977)
14. John W Graham
7. Hannah Graham (1875–1942)
30. William Hollis Culver (1798–1855)
15. Lydia Ellen Culver (1847–1937)
31. Hannah Gordon (1808–1887)
