= Finn Lake =

Lake in the state of Minnesota, United States

- Location within Minnesota
- Location: Wadena County, Minnesota
- Coordinates: 46°45′10″N 94°56′52″W
- Type: lake

Finn Lake is a lake in Wadena County, in the U.S. state of Minnesota.

A large share of the early settlers near this lake being natives of Finland caused the name to be selected.

== See also ==
- List of lakes in Minnesota
