= Josephine Feeney =

British children's author

Josephine Feeney is a British children's author. She writes novels, short stories and plays.

Her work has been published by HarperCollins, Penguin and Puffin.
