= Finney Creek =

Stream in Saline County, Missouri, U.S.

Coordinates: 38.9933533°N 93.2157612°W

Finney Creek is a stream in Saline County in the U.S. state of Missouri. It is a tributary of the Blackwater River.

The namesake of Finney Creek is unknown.

== See also ==
- List of rivers of Missouri
