= Ida Finney Mackrille =

American politician (1867–1960)

- Born: Ida Finney; August 21, 1867; Richmond, Indiana
- Died: June 4, 1960 (aged 92); Exeter, California
- Known for: American suffragist

Ida Finney Mackrille (1867–1960) was an American suffragist and a women's political leader in the State of California. She was known as the “Woman Orator of the West.” From 1911 until 1932, she was active in suffragist movement, and after she remained active in other types of politics.

== Biography ==
Ida Finney was born on August 21, 1867, in Richmond, Indiana, to parents Sara A. Long Finney and Joel J. Finney. Her father had served in the 57th Indiana Infantry Regiment. She was raised with two sisters. She married in 1897 to William R. Mackrille, a chief deputy clerk of the California State Supreme Court.

Mackrille served as the first vice-president of the San Francisco Center of the California Civic League, a group that fought for equality for women. She was considered one the foremost orators in California, often speaking on women's issues and politics. She served as San Francisco Office Manager for the 1921 Presidential campaign of Warren G. Harding. Later in life she was active in the Tulare County Republican Party and was involved in issues with the newly built, local women's prison.

Mackrille owned a vineyard from c.1930 until 1960 in Woodlake, California.

She died on June 4, 1960, at the age of 92 at Exeter Memorial Hospital in Exeter, near her home in Woodlake.
