= Leslie Phinney =

American thermal engineer

Leslie M. Phinney is an American thermal engineer and an expert on microscale heat transfer, particularly involving thin films, surfaces, and boundaries between different materials. She is a researcher at Sandia National Laboratories.

== Education and career ==
Phinney majored in aerospace engineering at the University of Texas at Austin, graduating in 1990. After a year at the University of Cambridge as a Churchill Scholar, she went to the University of California, Berkeley for graduate study in mechanical engineering, earning a master's degree in 1994 and completing her Ph.D. in 1997.

She became a faculty member in the Department of Mechanical and Industrial Engineering at the University of Illinois Urbana-Champaign in 1997, and in 2003 moved to Sandia National Laboratories.

== Recognition ==
Phinney was named a Fellow of the American Society of Mechanical Engineers in 2010. In 2017 the Society of Women Engineers gave her their Prism Award, honoring her for "charting her own path throughout her career, providing leadership in technology fields and professional organizations along the way".
