= P. E. S. Finney =

Officer in the Indian Police Service

Philip Edmund Stanley Finney OBE (11 December 1904 – 1980) was a police officer who served in the Indian Police Service and the British and Indian military intelligence.

Finney was born on 11 December 1904 in Hulme, Manchester and was educated at St. John's School in Surrey. Finney passed the Indian Police Service examination and joined the British Bengal Police in 1924. He was trained at Police Training College in Rajshahi, (now the Bangladesh Police Academy) and served in different districts of Bengal (now Bangladesh and West Bengal) and in the Special Branch of Calcutta Police in 1939–40. During the Second World War, Finney worked in Military Intelligence in the United Kingdom and in British India. He returned from India in 1947.

He was appointed as an officer of the Order of the British Empire in 1934 and was the leader of the British Indian Police contingent to the coronation of King George VI in London. After returning from India he spent eleven years in business in the United Kingdom and then six years in Central Africa as head of the Special Branch of the Nyasaland Police. He married Noel Montgomery and had two daughters and one son. He died in 1980. His book Just My Luck: Memoirs of a Police Officer of the Raj was published by The University Press Limited, Dhaka, Bangladesh, in 2000.
