= David Phinney =

David Phinney is a journalist and producer based in Washington, D.C., whose work has appeared on United States Public Broadcasting Service (PBS) and American Broadcasting Company (ABC) as well as in the Los Angeles Times, Politico, The New York Times, Miami Herald, the Hearst-owned San Francisco Examiner, and Wired.

His stories on unfair labor practices and poor treatment of foreign workers contracted to do construction work in Iraq have been the subject of congressional inquiries, ongoing US Justice Department criminal probes and investigations by US Inspectors General. In 2007 his story appeared on the Project Censored list.

In addition to documentary work and on-air reporting, Phinney has been a guest and analyst for the BBC, cable news programs and radio. His work includes political coverage, national affairs, war, terrorism and security. He has consulted with reporters and producers on stories for ABC, NBC, CBS, BBC, The Wall Street Journal and The Washington Post. His articles have been translated into a dozen different languages for distribution.

Phinney graduated from the University of California at Berkeley with a dual major in English and Political Science. He began his journalism career as a music and film critic and by writing humorous sketches about local personalities and events in the San Francisco Bay Area.

A one-time publishing executive and editor, he co-founded Bay City Publications in the San Francisco Bay Area, publisher of Bay City Business Journal and the Emeryville Guardian and other ventures. The two publications won awards for investigative work that exposed political corruption and real estate scandals in California. The effort triggered a five-year federal grand jury investigation and was reiterated by other California news organizations.
