= Finnish nationality law =

Nationality Act Kansalaisuuslaki Medborgarskapslag

Parliament of Finland
- Citation: 16.5.2003/359
- Passed by: Parliament of Finland
- Passed: 24 January 2003
- Signed by: President of Finland
- Signed: 16 May 2003
- Commenced: 1 June 2003
- Status: Amended

Finnish nationality law details the conditions by which an individual is a national of Finland. The primary law governing these requirements is the Nationality Act, which came into force on 1 June 2003. Finland is a member state of the European Union (EU) and all Finnish nationals are EU citizens. They are entitled to free movement rights in EU and European Free Trade Association (EFTA) countries and may vote in elections to the European Parliament.

Any person born to a married Finnish parent is typically a Finnish national at birth, regardless of the place of birth. Children of unmarried couples in which only the father is Finnish must be legitimised for them to acquire Finnish nationality. Foreign nationals may naturalise after meeting a minimum residence requirement (usually eight years) and demonstrating proficiency in Finnish, Swedish, Finnish Sign Language, or Finland-Swedish Sign Language.

== Terminology ==
The distinction between the meaning of the terms citizenship and nationality is not always clear in the English language and differs by country. Generally, nationality refers a person's legal belonging to a country and is the common term used in international treaties when referring to members of a state; citizenship refers to the set of rights and duties a person has in that nation.

This difference does not exist in Finnish and both terms are translated as kansalaisuus when referring to national status. The Ministry of the Interior has officially translated the name of the legislation in force as both the "Citizenship Act" in 2023 and the "Nationality Act" in 2003.

== Acquisition and loss of nationality ==
=== Entitlement by birth, descent, or adoption ===
Children automatically receive Finnish citizenship at birth if at least one married parent is a Finnish citizen, regardless of birthplace. Individuals born to unmarried Finnish mothers automatically receive citizenship without further requirements. Children born within Finland to unmarried Finnish fathers acquire citizenship after paternity is established; those born abroad may receive that status automatically after their parents marry, or by declaration if their parents never marry.

Adopted children under the age of 12 are automatically granted Finnish citizenship, while older adoptees became eligible to acquire citizenship by declaration. Abandoned children found in Finland with unclear parentage are considered to be Finnish unless they are found to have foreign nationality before the age of five.

Children of recognised refugees or individuals provided official protection by Finland acquire Finnish citizenship by birth in the country if they do not automatically acquire foreign nationality at birth. Any person born in the country who would otherwise be stateless at birth and who does not hold an entitlement to apply for any foreign nationality also acquires Finnish citizenship by birth.

=== Voluntary acquisition ===
Foreigners may naturalise as Finnish citizens after completing a required period of residence. Applicants must hold no criminal record and pass a language skills test equivalent to level B1 in the Common European Framework of Reference for Languages in Finnish, Swedish, Finnish Sign Language, or Finland-Swedish Sign Language.

The residence requirement is met living in the country continuously for eight years. The minimum period is reduced to four years of continuous residence or six years of discontinuous residence for: spouses or registered civil partners of Finnish citizens who have been married for at least three years, registered refugees or stateless persons, children over the age of 15 applying with or after a naturalising parent, and applicants with strong ties to the country who can also fulfill the language skills requirement early. Children under 15 with a naturalised parent may be granted citizenship immediately after becoming domiciled in Finland, provided that they meet all other requirements. Citizens of other Nordic countries meet the residence requirement after living in the country for two years.

Individuals between age 18 and 22 who have been domiciled in Finland for at least 10 years, including continuous residence in the preceding two years, are eligible to acquire citizenship by declaration. Nordic citizens resident in the country for at least five years who did not acquire their other Nordic citizenship by naturalisation are also entitled to become Finnish citizens by declaration.

The government has discretionary power to deny naturalisation if an applicant is suspected of being a threat to national security, that person does not intend to settle in Finland, or granting citizenship is exceptionally contrary to the national interest. Conversely, individuals who acquire citizenship by declaration are entitled to gain that status after meeting the requirements.

=== Loss and resumption ===
Finnish citizens may apply to relinquish their citizenship, provided that the applicants are ordinarily resident overseas and already possess another nationality or are in the process of naturalising in a foreign country. Relinquishing citizenship is not possible if the applicant becomes stateless, except where naturalisation as a foreign national requires renunciation of Finnish citizenship.

Finnish citizens with multiple nationalities automatically lose their Finnish citizenship on reaching age 22 unless they have a sufficient connection to Finland. This can be fulfilled by being domiciled in Finland or permanently resident in another Nordic country for at least seven years. Affected individuals between age 18 and 22 may otherwise submit a written declaration of intent to retain Finnish citizenship, apply for or hold a Finnish passport, or complete military or government service in Finland.

Citizenship may be involuntarily removed from a person who fraudulently acquired it within five years of that person having become a Finnish citizen, or individuals who were granted citizenship by descent from a Finnish father but paternity is later annulled. Revocation on the basis of fraud has only occurred on one occasion. Other than those whose citizenship was removed because of fraud or annulled paternity, former citizens may apply to reacquire Finnish citizenship by declaration.

While losing Finnish citizenship is rare, the benefits of citizenship for persons residing abroad without close ties to Finland are few. A citizen without domicile in Finland and without municipal domicile has no rights to Finnish social security, to Finnish consular help in personal emergencies, or to Finnish health services. The most important remaining rights are the absolute right to return to Finland, to vote in national elections, to have a Finnish passport, to work in the European Union without the working visa requirements faced by non-European Union citizens, and to enroll in Scandinavian universities as a European Union citizen (waiving university fees). In addition, all Finnish citizens have the right to receive consular protection from Finnish foreign missions in case of a major crisis in the host country or in case of arrest or incarceration. However, if a Finnish citizen is also a citizen of the host country, Finnish foreign missions will not act on his behalf.

== Ålandic provincial right of domicile ==
People from the autonomous Finnish province of Åland, have provincial (Ålandic) right of domicile in addition to their national (Finnish) citizenship. The right of domicile is called hembygdsrätt (kotiseutuoikeus in Finnish) and it gives Ålanders the right to buy and own real estate, abstain from national service, vote for and be elected to the Lagting and set up a business on Åland. Ordinary Finns without a right of domicile have none of these rights in Åland.

Ordinary Finns can get Ålandic right of domicile after living on the islands for five years and proving their satisfactory knowledge of Swedish. Ålanders lose their right of domicile after living outside Åland for five years, or on forfeiting their Finnish citizenship. Non-Finns can obtain Ålandic right of domicile when obtaining Finnish citizenship, if they fulfill the requirements for the right of domicile.

== Municipal domicile and registration ==
The Finnish law grants several rights, e.g. social services, municipal franchise and education on the basis of municipal domicile (Finnish: kotikunta). The concept of municipal domicile is based on residency and is tied to citizenship only weakly. However, the naturalization legislation refers several times to the municipal domicile as a requirement for naturalization.

=== Registration of the municipal domicile ===
As the main rule, the person is domiciled in their place of residence. A new-born is domiciled in the municipality of its mother. If a person has several residences, the place to which they have the closest ties is their domicile. The ties may be related to work, family or other similar arrangements. The register authorities will determine the domicile of the person whose opinion cannot be resolved.

A person who leaves the country to stay abroad for more than a year, loses municipal domicile immediately. However, exceptions are made for persons who retain close ties to Finland or work as diplomats, missionaries or aid workers.

Finnish and EEA member state citizens are domiciled in their places of residence immediately if they move into the country from abroad. Aliens are domiciled if they have a permanent residence permission or if they are family members of a person domiciled in Finland. Other aliens are domiciled if they have a temporary residence permit for at least a year and the reasons for their stay point that they might remain in the country. Any family members of a person with a municipal domicile are also domiciled in the municipality if they live together. All foreigners with a municipal domicile are also required to register into the national population database.

When moving, the person's domicile will not change if the move has been caused by

- temporary work, study, illness or other similar reason that will not last for more than a year
- care in a hospital, sanatorium, nursing home, asylum etc.
- professional seafaring
- detention in a penitentiary
- membership of the parliament or membership of the European Parliament
- service as a conscript

Any person who is domiciled in Finland is obliged to inform the registry office on moving permanently or temporarily within seven days from the move. Also persons who move from a residence without having any new address are required to report the change. Failure to report moves is punishable by 50 euro administrative fine.

=== Effects of municipal domicile ===
The main political right tied to municipal domicile is the municipal suffrage. Finnish and Nordic citizens have the municipal voting right and eligibility in the municipality where they had domicile 51 days prior to election day. Other foreigners have the municipal suffrage if they have had Finnish municipal domicile for the last two years. Administratively, the municipal domicile is one of the most important factors in determining the jurisdiction of different state authorities over the person.

The municipal and church tax are the most important duties based on the municipal domicile. During the calendar year, the person pays tax to the municipality where they were domiciled on 31 December of the preceding year. If the person belongs to the Evangelical Lutheran Church of Finland or to the Finnish Orthodox Church, they belong to the parish of their domicile and pay church tax to the domicile parish of the 31 December of the preceding year. Another duty tied to the municipal domicile is the duty to accept a position in municipal board, if the municipal council elects the person to a board.

Municipal domicile grants also other than political rights. Most social and health services are provided by the municipalities to their residents, while persons not domiciled in the municipality enjoy much less protection. In addition to the social and health services, the municipal domicile may yield other, somewhat less important rights relating to natural resources. In state-owned lake water area (in major lakes) and on state-owned lake islands, all persons domiciled in municipalities by the lake are empowered to hunt. The same applies to state-owned land in Northern Finland, where persons domiciled there may hunt in the state-owned forests of their home municipality. Another Northern peculiarity of municipal domicile is reindeer ownership, which is restricted to EEA citizens domiciled in the municipalities of the reindeer herding region.

=== Domicile in Finland ===
With regard to the social protections provided by the Finnish state instead of municipalities, the basis for eligibility for benefits and grants is domicile in Finland (Finnish: Suomessa asuminen). Among the social protections meant here are e.g. maternity and paternity leave pay, child grant, unemployment benefits and other forms of social insurance.

Although similarly worded, the definition used is not exactly the same as for the determination of municipal domicile. In particular, the municipal domicile alone does not make an alien or citizen domiciled in Finland. The domicile in Finland requires factual residence and home in Finland, as well as permanent and continued physical presence in the country. This applies to foreigners and citizens alike. Persons moving into Finland may be considered domiciled in Finland immediately if they actually intend to remain in the country. This means that not even a Finnish citizen moving into Finland is guaranteed the state social benefits immediately after entry, unless they can show that they intend to remain.

On the other hand, the concept of "domicile in Finland" allows for more consideration than the mechanistic definition municipal domicile. Students, missionaries, scholars, scientists, aid workers, officials of international organizations and employees of Finnish companies, as well as their family members may retain their domicile in Finland indefinitely even if they lose their municipal domicile. However, the Kela, which determines the domicile status, has a wide leeway to judge the circumstances of individuals.

A foreigner with both municipal domicile and a domicile in Finland enjoys all social and health services provided to Finnish citizens.

== Dual citizenship ==
With effect from 1 June 2003, a Finnish citizen acquiring a foreign citizenship does not lose Finnish citizenship.

Former Finnish citizens who lost Finnish citizenship prior to this date (upon naturalisation in another country) may re-acquire Finnish citizenship by declaration. Children of former Finnish citizens may also acquire Finnish citizenship by declaration. The deadline for submission of applications was 31 May 2008.

As of July 2005, over 5000 people had acquired or resumed Finnish citizenship under this new provision.

The changes to the law also mean that foreigners seeking naturalisation as a Finnish citizen do not need to renounce their former citizenship. They may retain it if the law of the other country permits them to do so.

Effective 1 May 2019, individuals with dual citizenship can be deprived of their citizenship should they be sentenced for serious crimes which can lead to eight years prison. Given examples of such were terrorism, treason, hostage taking, people smuggling, inciting to war and espionage. The decision on whether to cancel the Finnish citizenship will be taken by the Finnish Immigration Service. The law is not retroactive and therefore does not encompass people with Finnish citizenship who have joined the Islamic State of Iraq and the Levant.

In early 2022, the Finns Party called for dual citizenship to be abolished in Finland. a few months later an MP from the National Coalition Party called for a law banning non-native Finnish citizens/dual nationals from holding positions vital to national security, including police officers. He would later withdraw the bill.

== Citizenship of the European Union ==
Because Finland forms part of the European Union, Finnish citizens are also citizens of the European Union under European Union law and thus enjoy rights of free movement and have the right to vote in elections for the European Parliament. When in a non-EU country where there is no Finnish embassy, Finnish citizens have the right to get consular protection from the embassy of any other EU country present in that country. Finnish citizens can live and work in any country within the EU as a result of the right of free movement and residence granted in Article 21 of the EU Treaty.

== See also ==
- Visa policy of the Schengen Area
- Visa requirements for Finnish citizens
