= List of United Kingdom MPs: A =

Following is an incomplete list of past and present Members of Parliament (MPs) of the United Kingdom whose surnames begin with A. Linked years lead to articles about the election of that year

Colour key: Irish National Federation Change UK Coalition Liberal Common Wealth Conservative Independent Liberal Irish Conservative Irish Parliamentary Party Irish Unionist Liberal Unionist Labour Liberal Liberal Democrats Liberal Unionist Liberal-Labour National Labour National Liberal New Party Non-partisan Peelite Sinn Féin SNP The Independents Tory Ulster Unionist Whigs

Name	Image	Party	First elected	Constituency	Other positions
Charles Abbot		Tory	1801	Helston (1801–1802) Heytesbury (1802) Woodstock (1802–1806) Oxford University (1806–1817)	Speaker of the House of Commons (1802–1817) Chief Secretary for Ireland (1801–1802) Also member of the Parliament of Great Britain Later ennobled as Baron Colchester
Diane Abbott		Labour	1987	Hackney North and Stoke Newington (1987–present)	Shadow Home Secretary (2016–2020) Shadow Health Secretary (2016) Shadow International Development Secretary (2015–2016) Shadow Minister for Public Health (2010–2013)
Jack Abbott		Labour	2024	Ipswich (2024–present)	
Sir William Abdy 7th Baronet of Felix Hall		Independent	1817	Malmesbury (1817–1818)	
Alexander Abercromby		Independent	1817	Clackmannanshire (1817–1818)	
George Abercromby		Independent	1805	Edinburgh (1805–1806) Clackmannanshire (1806–1807, 1812–1815)	Lord Lieutenant of Stirlingshire (1837–1843) Later ennobled as Baron Abercromby
George Ralph Abercromby		Independent	1824	Clackmannanshire (1824–1826, 1830–1831) Stirlingshire (1838–1841) Clackmannanshire and Kinross-shire (1841–1842)	Lord Lieutenant of Clackmannanshire (1840–1852) Later ennobled as Baron Abercromby
James Abercromby		Whig	1807	Midhurst (1807–1812) Calne (1812–1830) Edinburgh (1832–1839)	Speaker of the House of Commons (1835–1839) Master of the Mint (1834–1835) Lord Chief Baron of the Court of Exchequer (1830–1832) Judge-Advocate-General (1827–1828) Later ennobled as Baron Abercromby
Sir John Abercromby		Independent	1815	Clackmannanshire (1815–1817)	
Sir Robert Abercromby 5th Baronet of Birkenbog		Independent	1812	Banffshire (1812–1818)	
Sir Charles Abney-Hastings 2nd Baronet of Willesley Hall		Tory	1826	Leicester (1826–1831)	High Sheriff of Derbyshire (1825–1826)
William Abraham		Liberal-Labour	1885	Rhondda (1885–1910)	Treasurer of the Miners' Federation of Great Britain (1904–1918) President of the South Wales Miners' Federation (1898–1812)
William Abraham		Labour	1885	Rhondda (1910–1918) Rhondda West (1918–1918)	Treasurer of the Miners' Federation of Great Britain (1904–1918) President of the South Wales Miners' Federation (1898–1812)
Debbie Abrahams		Labour	2011	Oldham East and Saddleworth (2011–present)	Shadow Work and Pensions Secretary (2016–2018) Shadow Minister for Disabled People (2015–2016)
Leo Abse		Labour	1958	Pontypool (1958–1983) Torfaen (1983–1987)	Chair of the Welsh Affairs Select Committee (1980–1981)
Archibald Acheson 2nd Earl of Gosford		Tory	1801	County Armagh (1801–1807)	Governor General of British North America (1835–1837) Captain of the Yeomen of the Guard (1934, 1935) Also Member of the Parliament of Ireland Later ennobled as Baron Worlingham
Archibald Acheson 3rd Earl of Gosford		Whig	1830	Armagh (1830–1847)	Lord Lieutenant of Armagh (1864) Later ennobled as Baron Acheson
Benjamin St John Ackers		Conservative	1885	West Gloucestershire (1885–1885)	
James Ackers		Conservative	1841	Ludlow (1841–1847)	
Thomas Ackroyd		Liberal	1923	Manchester Moss Side (1923–1924)	
Sir Arthur Dyke Acland 13th Baronet of Columb John		Liberal	1885	Rotherham (1885–1899)	President of the National Liberal Federation (1906–1907) Vice-president of the Committee on Education (1892–1895)
Sir Charles Thomas Dyke Acland 12th Baronet of Columb John		Liberal	1882	East Cornwall (1882–1885) Launceston (1885–1892)	President of the Churchmen's Union (1908–1915)
Francis Dyke Acland 14th Baronet of Columb John		Liberal	1906	Richmond (1906–1910) North West Cornwall (1910–1922) Tiverton (1923–1924) North Cornwall (1932–1939)	Parliamentary Secretary to the Board of Agriculture and Fisheries (1915–1916) Financial Secretary to the Treasury (1915) Under-Secretary of State for Foreign Affairs (1911–1915) Financial Secretary to the War Office (1908–1910, 1911)
Sir Richard Acland 15th Baronet of Columb John		Liberal	1935	Barnstaple (1935–1942)	Chairman of the Common Wealth Party (1942–1943, 1944–1945)
Sir Richard Acland 15th Baronet of Columb John		Common Wealth	1935	Barnstaple (1942–1945)	Chairman of the Common Wealth Party (1942–1943, 1944–1945)
Sir Richard Acland 15th Baronet of Columb John		Labour	1935	Gravesend (1947–1955)	Chairman of the Common Wealth Party (1942–1943, 1944–1945)
Sir Thomas Dyke Acland 10th Baronet of Columb John		Tory	1812	Devon (1812–1818, 1820–1831)	
Sir Thomas Dyke Acland 10th Baronet of Columb John		Conservative	1812	North Devon (1837–1857)	
Sir Thomas Dyke Acland 11th Baronet of Columb John		Conservative	1837	West Somerset (1837–1847)	
Sir Thomas Dyke Acland 11th Baronet of Columb John		Liberal	1837	Devonshire North (1865–1885) Wellington (1885–1886)	
Sir Gilbert Acland-Troyte		Conservative	1924	Tiverton (1924–1945)	
William a'Court 1st Baronet of Heytesbury		Tory	1806	Heytesbury (1806–1807)	Also Member of Parliament of Great Britain
Charles Ashe A'Court-Repington		Tory	1820	Heytesbury (1820–1820)	
Edward Henry A'Court-Repington		Tory	1820	Heytesbury (1820–1832)	
Edward Henry A'Court-Repington		Conservative	1820	Tamworth (1837–1847)	
William Acton		Irish Conservative	1841	Wicklow (1841–1848)	
Sir Robert Adair		Whig	1801	Appleby (1801–1802) Camelford (1802–1812)	British Ambassador to Belgium (1831–1835) British Ambassador to the Ottoman Empire (1808–1809) British Minister to Austria (1806–1807) Also a Member of the Parliament of Great Britain
Sir Charles Adam		Independent	1831	Kinross-shire (1831–1832) Clackmannanshire and Kinross-shire (1832–1841)	Lord Lieutenant of Kinross-shire (1839–1853) First Naval Lord (1834, 1841–1844, 1846–1847)
Sir Charles Adam		Whig	1831	Kinross-shire (1831–1832) Clackmannanshire and Kinross-shire (1832–1841)	Lord Lieutenant of Kinross-shire (1839–1853) First Naval Lord (1834, 1841–1844, 1846–1847)
Shockat Adam		Independent	2024	Leicester South (2024–present)	
William Adam		Independent	1806	Kincardineshire (1806–1812)	Chancellor of the Duchy of Cornwall (1806–1815) Attorney-General of the Duchy of Cornwall (1805–1816) Solicitor-General of the Duchy of Cornwall (1802–1805) Treasurer of the Ordnance (1780–1782, 1783) Also Member of the Parliament of Great Britain
William Augustus Adam		Conservative	1910	Woolwich (1910–1910)	
Sir William Patrick Adam		Liberal	1859	Clackmannan and Kinross (1859–1880)	Governor of Madras (1880–1881) Paymaster General (1873–1874) First Commissioner of Works (1873–1874, 1880) Lord of the Treasury (1865–1866, 1868–1873)
Allen Adams		Labour	1979	Paisley (1979–1983) Paisley North (1983–1990)	
Charles Adams		Tory	1801	Weymouth and Melcombe Regis (1801–1812)	
David Adams		Labour	1922	Newcastle-upon-Tyne West (1922–1923) Consett (1935–1943)	
Gerry Adams		Sinn Féin	1983	Belfast West (1983–1992, 1997–2011)	President of Sinn Féin in the Dáil Éireann (2011–2018) President of Sinn Féin (1983–2018) Vice President of Sinn Féin (1978–1983) Also Member of the Northern Ireland Forum, Northern Ireland Assembly, Northern Ireland Assembly (1982) and the Dáil Éireann
Irene Adams		Labour	1990	Paisley North (1990–2005)	Later ennobled Baroness Adams of Craigielea
James Adams		Independent	1801	Bramber (1801–1802) Harwich (1803–1806, 1807)	Also a Member of the Parliament of Great Britain
Richard Adams		Labour	1945	Balham and Tooting (1945–1950) Wandsworth Central (1950–1955)	Lord Commissioner of the Treasury (1949–1951)
Vyvyan Adams		Conservative	1931	Leeds West (1931–1945)	
William Adams		Independent	1801	Plympton Erle (1801–1801)	Died in office Also a Member of the Parliament of Great Britain
William Adams		Tory	1801	Totnes (1801–1811)	Died in office Also a Member of the Parliament of Great Britain
William Thomas Adams		Labour Co-operative	1945	Hammersmith South (1945–1949)	Died in office
Jennie Adamson		Labour	1938	Dartford (1938–1945) Bexley (1945–1946)	Parliamentary Secretary to the Minister for Pensions (1945–1946) Chair of the Labour Party (1935–1936)
William Adamson		Labour	1910	West Fife (1910–1931)	Secretary for Scotland (1924, 1929–1931) Leader of the Labour Party (1917–1921) Treasurer of the Scottish Miners' Federation (1914–1922) General Secretary of the Fife and Kinross Miners' Association (1908–1917)
William Murdoch Adamson		Labour	1922	Cannock (1922–1931, 1935–1945)	Lord Commissioner of the Treasury (1941–1944)
Henry Addington 1st Viscount Sidmouth		Tory	1801	Devizes (1801–1805)	Home Secretary (1812–1822) Lord Privy Seal (1806) Prime Minister of the United Kingdom (1801–1804) First Lord of the Treasury (1801–1804) Chancellor of the Exchequer (1801–1804) Leader of the House of Commons (1801) Lord President of the Council (1805, 1806–1807, 1812) Speaker of the House of Commons (1789–1801) Also Member of the Parliament of Great Britain Later ennobled as Viscount Sidmouth
John Hiley Addington		Tory	1801	Wendover (1801–1802) Bossiney (1802–1803) Harwich (1803–1818)	Under-Secretary of State for Home Affairs (1812–1818) Paymaster of the Forces (1803–1804) Secretary to the Treasury (1801–1802) Also Member of the Parliament of Great Britain
William Addington 3rd Viscount Sidmouth		Tory	1863	Devizes (1863–1864)	Later ennobled as Viscount Sidmouth
Christopher Addison 1st Viscount Addison		Liberal	1910	Hoxton (1910–1918)	Lord President of the Council (1951) Paymaster General (1948–1949) Lord Privy Seal (1947–1951) Leader of the House of Lords (1945–1951) Dominion Affairs Secretary (1945–1947) Minister of Agriculture (1930–1931) Minister without portfolio (1921) Later ennobled as Baron Addison and Viscount Addison
Christopher Addison 1st Viscount Addison		Coalition Liberal	1910	Shoreditch (1918–1922)	Lord President of the Council (1951) Paymaster General (1948–1949) Lord Privy Seal (1947–1951) Leader of the House of Lords (1945–1951) Dominion Affairs Secretary (1945–1947) Minister of Agriculture (1930–1931) Minister without portfolio (1921) Later ennobled as Baron Addison and Viscount Addison
Christopher Addison 1st Viscount Addison		Labour	1910	Swindon (1929–1931, 1934–1935)	Lord President of the Council (1951) Paymaster General (1948–1949) Lord Privy Seal (1947–1951) Leader of the House of Lords (1945–1951) Dominion Affairs Secretary (1945–1947) Minister of Agriculture (1930–1931) Minister without portfolio (1921) Later ennobled as Baron Addison and Viscount Addison
Henry John Adeane		Whig	1830	Cambridgeshire (1830–1832)	
Sir Ryland Adkins		Liberal	1906	Middleton (1906–1918) Middleton and Prestwich (1918–1923)	
Robert Adley		Conservative	1970	Bristol North East (1970–1974) Christchurch and Lymington (1974–1983) Christchurch (1983–1993)	Chair of the Transport Select Committee (1992–1993)
Bim Afolami		Conservative	2017	Hitchin and Harpenden (2017–2024)	
Adam Afriyie		Conservative	2005	Windsor (2005–2024)	
Sir Emanuel Felix Agar		Tory	1807	Sudbury (1807–1812)	
George Agar-Ellis		Independent	1818	Heytesbury (1818–1820)	First Commissioner of Woods and Forests (1830–1831) Later ennobled as Baron Dover
George Agar-Ellis		Whig	1818	Seaford (1820–1826) Ludgershall (1826–1830) Okehampton (1830–1831)	First Commissioner of Woods and Forests (1830–1831) Later ennobled as Baron Dover
Thomas Agar-Robartes		Whig	1847	Cornwall East (1847–1859)	Later ennobled as Baron Robartes
Thomas Agar-Robartes		Liberal	1847	Cornwall East (1859–1868)	Later ennobled as Baron Robartes
Thomas Agar-Robartes, 6th Viscount Clifden		Liberal	1880	Cornwall East (1880–1882)	Lord-Lieutenant of Cambridgeshire (1906–1915) Later ennobled as Baron Robartes and Viscount Clifden
Thomas Agar-Robartes		Liberal	1906	Bodmin (1906–1906) St Austell (1908–1915)	Died in office
Sir James Agg-Gardner		Conservative	1874	Cheltenham ( 1874–1880, 1885–1895, 1900–1906, 1911–1928)	Died in office
Sir Andrew Agnew 7th Baronet of Lochnaw		Whig	1830	Wigtownshire (1830–1837)	
Sir Andrew Agnew 8th Baronet of Lochnaw		Whig	1856	Wigtownshire (1856–1868)	
Sir Andrew Agnew 8th Baronet of Lochnaw		Liberal	1856	Wigtownshire (1859–1868)	
Sir Andrew Agnew 9th Baronet of Lochnaw		Liberal Unionist	1900	Edinburgh South (1900–1906)	
Sir George Agnew 2nd Baronet of Great Stanhope Street		Liberal	1906	Salford West (1906–1918)	
Sir Peter Agnew 1st Baronet of Clendry		Conservative	1931	Camborne (1931–1950) South Worcestershire (1955–1966)	
Sir William Agnew 1st Baronet of Great Stanhope Street		Liberal	1880	South East Lancashire (1880–1885) Stretford (1885–1886)	
Imran Ahmad Khan		Conservative	2019	Wakefield (2019–2022)	Appointed to the Chiltern Hundreds (2022)
Zubir Ahmed		Labour	2024	Glasgow South West (2024–present)	
Tasmina Ahmed-Sheikh		SNP	2015	Ochil and South Perthshire (2015–2017)	SNP Spokesperson for International Trade (2015–2017)
Nick Ainger		Labour	1992	Pembrokeshire (1992–1997) Carmarthen West and South Pembrokeshire (1997–2010)	Lord Commissioner of the Treasury (2001–2005)
Sir Robert Ainslie 1st Baronet of Great Torrington		Independent	1801	Milborne Port (1801–1802)	British Ambassador to the Ottoman Empire (1775–1793) Also Member of the Parliament of Great Britain
Robert Sharpe Ainslie		Independent	1802	Mitchell (1802–1806)	
William Ainsley		Labour	1955	North West Durham (1955–1964)	
Bob Ainsworth		Labour	1992	Coventry North East (1992–2015)	Shadow Defence Secretary (2010) Defence Secretary (2009–2010) Minister for the Armed Forces (2007–2009) Government Deputy Chief Whip (2003–2007) Lord Commissioner of the Treasury (1997–2001)
Peter Ainsworth		Conservative	1992	East Surrey (1992–2010)	Shadow Environment Secretary (2001–2002, 2005–2009) Shadow Culture, Media and Sport Secretary (1998–2001)
Peter Ainsworth		Whig	1835	Bolton (1835–1847)	
Sir John Aird 1st Baronet of London		Conservative	1887	Paddington North (1887–1906)	Mayor of Paddington (1900–02)
Craigie Aitchison		Labour	1929	Kilmarnock (1929–1931)	Lord Justice Clerk (1933–1941) Lord Advocate (1929–1933)
Craigie Aitchison		National Labour	1929	Kilmarnock (1931–1933)	Lord Justice Clerk (1933–1941) Lord Advocate (1929–1933)
Jonathan Aitken		Conservative	1974	Thanet East (1974–1983) South Thanet (1983–1997)	Chief Secretary to the Treasury (1994–1995) Minister for Defence Procurement (1992–1994)
Sir Max Aitken 1st Baronet of Cherkley		Conservative	1910	Ashton-under-Lyne (1910–1916)	Lord Privy Seal (1943–1945) Minister of War Production (1942) Minister of Supply (1941–1942) Minister of Aircraft Production (1940–1941) Chancellor of the Duchy of Lancaster (1918) Minister of Information (1918) Later ennobled as Baron Beaverbrook
Sir Max Aitken 2nd Baronet of Cherkley		Conservative	1945	Holborn (1945–1950)	Later ennobled as Baron Beaverbrook
Nickie Aiken		Conservative	2019	Cities of London and Westminster (2019–2024)	Leader of Westminster City Council (2017–2020)
Sir William Aitken		Conservative	1950	Bury St Edmunds (1950–1964)	
Luke Akehurst		Labour	2024	North Durham (2024–present)	
Aretas Akers-Douglas 1st Viscount Chilston		Conservative	1880	East Kent (1880–1885) St Augustine's (1885–1911)	Home Secretary (1902–1905) First Commissioner of Works (1895–1902) Parliamentary Secretary to the Treasury (1885–1886, 1886–1892) Later ennobled as Viscount Chilston
Sadik Al-Hassan		Labour	2024	North Somerset (2024–present)	
Bayo Alaba		Labour	2024	Southend East and Rochford (2024–present)	
Sir Irving Albery		Conservative	1924	Gravesend (1924–1945)	
Austen Albu		Labour	1948	Edmonton (1948–1974)	Minister for Economic Affairs (1965–1967) Chairman of the Fabian Society (1953–1954)
Thomas Alcock		Independent	1826	Newton (1826–1830)	High Sheriff of Surrey (1837)
Thomas Alcock		Whig	1826	Ludlow (1839–1840) East Surrey (1847–1859)	High Sheriff of Surrey (1837)
Thomas Alcock		Liberal	1826	East Surrey (1859–1865)	High Sheriff of Surrey (1837)
William Congreve Alcock		Tory	1801	Waterford City (1801–1803)	Also Member of the Parliament of Ireland
Sir Percy Alden		Liberal	1906	Tottenham (1906–1918)	
Sir Percy Alden		Labour	1906	Tottenham South (1923–1924)	
Peter Aldous		Conservative	2010	Waveney (2010–2024)	
John Aldridge		Conservative	1868	Horsham (1868–1869)	
A. V. Alexander		Labour Co-operative	1922	Sheffield Hillsborough (1922–1931, 1935–1950)	Leader of the Labour Party in the House of Lords (1955–1964) Chancellor of the Duchy of Lancaster (1950–1951) Minister of Defence (1946–1950) Minister without Portfolio (1946) First Lord of the Admiralty (1929–1931, 1940–1945, 1945–1946) Later ennobled as Viscount Alexander of Hillsborough and Earl Alexander of Hillsborough
Boyd Alexander		Independent	1803	Clyde Burghs (1803–1806)	
Sir Claud Alexander 1st Baronet of Ballochmyle		Conservative	1874	Ayrshire South (1874–1885)	
Sir Danny Alexander		Liberal Democrat	2005	Inverness, Nairn, Badenoch and Strathspey (2005–2015)	Chief Secretary to the Treasury (2010–2015) Secretary of State for Scotland (2010)
Douglas Alexander		Labour	1997	Paisley South (1997–2005) Paisley and Renfrewshire South (2005–2015) Lothian East (2024–present)	Shadow Foreign Secretary (2011–2015) Shadow Work and Pensions Secretary (2010–2011) Shadow International Development Secretary (2010) International Development Secretary (2007–2010) Secretary of State for Scotland (2006–2007) Transport Secretary (2006–2007) Minister for Europe (2005–2006) Minister for Trade (2004–2005) Chancellor of the Duchy of Lancaster (2003–2004)
Heidi Alexander		Labour	2010	Lewisham East (2010–2018) Swindon South (2024–present)	Deputy Mayor of London for Transport (2018–2021) Shadow Health Secretary (2015–2016)
Henry Alexander		Tory	1801	Londonderry City (1801–1802) Old Sarum (1802–1806)	Also Member of the Parliament of Ireland
Henry Alexander		Tory	1826	Barnstaple (1826–1830)	
James Alexander		Tory	1812	Old Sarum (1812–1832)	
James Alexander 2nd Viscount Alexander		Conservative	1837	Tyrone (1837–1839)	High Sheriff of Armagh (1836) Later ennobled as Earl of Caledon
Josias Alexander		Tory	1820	Old Sarum (1820–1828, 1830– 1832)	
Maurice Alexander		National Liberal	1922	Southwark South East (1922–1923)	
Richard Alexander		Conservative	1979	Newark (1979–1997)	
Sir William Alexander		Scottish Unionist	1923	Glasgow Central (1923–1945)	
Rushanara Ali		Labour	2010	Bethnal Green and Bow (2010–2024) Bethnal Green and Stepney (2024–present)	Shadow Further Education Minister (2013–14) Shadow International Development Minister (2010–13)
Tahir Ali		Labour	2019	Birmingham Hall Green (2019–present)	
Michael Alison		Conservative	1964	Barkston Ash (1964–1983) Selby (1983–1997)	Second Church Estates Commissioner (1987–1997) Minister for Employment (1981–1983) Minister for Northern Ireland (1979–1981)
Sir Alexander Allan 1st Baronet of Kingsgate		Tory	1803	Berwick-upon-Tweed (1803–1806, 1807–1820)	Director of the East India Company (1814–1817, 1819–1820)
George Allan		Tory	1813	Durham (1813–1818)	
Richard Allan		Liberal Democrats	1997	Sheffield Hallam (1997–2005)	Later ennobled as Baron Allan of Hallam
Lucy Allan		Conservative	2015	Telford (2015–2024)	
Robert Allan		Conservative	1951	Paddington South (1951–1966)	Financial Secretary to the Admiralty (1958–1959) Parliamentary Private Secretary to the Prime Minister (1955–1956)
Alexander Allardyce		Independent	1801	Aberdeen Burghs (1801–1802)	Also Member of Parliament of Great Britain
James Allason		Conservative	1959	Hemel Hempstead (1959–1974)	
Rupert Allason		Conservative	1987	Torbay (1987–1997)	
Frank Allaun		Labour	1955	Salford East (1955–1983)	Chair of The Labour Party (1978–1979)
Walter Alldritt		Labour	1964	Liverpool Scotland (1964–1971)	Regional Secretary of the National Union of General and Municipal Workers (1970–1981)
Arthur Allen		Labour	1945	Bosworth (1945–1959)	Opposition Whip (1951)
Charles Allen		Liberal	1900	Stroud (1900–1918)	
Charles Allen		Liberal	1892	Pembroke and Haverfordwest (1892–1895)	
Henry George Allen		Liberal	1880	Pembroke (1880–1885) Pembroke and Haverfordwest (1885–1886)	
John Hensleigh Allen		Whig	1818	Pembroke (1818–1826)	High Sheriff of Pembrokeshire (1808–1809)
Sir John Sandeman Allen		Conservative	1924	Liverpool West Derby (1924–1935)	Died in office
John Sandeman Allen		Conservative	1931	Birkenhead West (1931–1945)	
Graham Allen		Labour	1987	Nottingham North (1987–2017)	Chair of Political and Constitutional Reform Committee (2010–2015) Vice-Chamberlain of the Household (1998–2001) Lord Commissioner of the Treasury (1997–1998)
Heidi Allen		Conservative	2015	South Cambridgeshire (2015–2019)	Acting Leader of Change UK (2019) Change UK Spokesperson for Welfare, Pensions, Social Care and Business (2019)
Heidi Allen		Change UK	2015	South Cambridgeshire (2019)	Acting Leader of Change UK (2019) Change UK Spokesperson for Welfare, Pensions, Social Care and Business (2019)
Heidi Allen		Independent	2015	South Cambridgeshire (2019)	Acting Leader of Change UK (2019) Change UK Spokesperson for Welfare, Pensions, Social Care and Business (2019)
Heidi Allen		The Independents	2015	South Cambridgeshire (2019)	Acting Leader of Change UK (2019) Change UK Spokesperson for Welfare, Pensions, Social Care and Business (2019)
Heidi Allen		Liberal Democrats	2015	South Cambridgeshire (2019)	Acting Leader of Change UK (2019) Change UK Spokesperson for Welfare, Pensions, Social Care and Business (2019)
Henry George Allen		Liberal	1880	Pembroke (1880–1885) Pembroke and Haverfordwest (1885–1886)	
Sir Ronald Wilberforce Allen		Liberal	1923	Leicester South (1923–1924)	
Scholefield Allen		Labour	1945	Crewe (1945–1974)	Recorder of Blackburn (1947–1970)
W. E. D. Allen		Ulster Unionist	1929	Belfast West (1929–1931)	
W. E. D. Allen		New Party	1929	Belfast West (1931)	
Sir William Allen		Irish Unionist	1917	North Armagh (1917–1921)	Sovereign Grand Master of the Royal Black Preceptory (1924–1947)
Sir William Allen		Ulster Unionist	1917	North Armagh (1917–1922) Armagh (1922–1947)	Sovereign Grand Master of the Royal Black Preceptory (1924–1947)
Garry Allighan		Labour	1945	Gravesend (1945–1947)	
Augustus Allhusen		Conservative	1897	Salisbury (1897–1900) Hackney Central (1900–1906)	High Sheriff of Buckinghamshire (1913)
Rosena Allin-Khan		Labour	2016	Tooting (2016–present)	Shadow Secretary of State for Mental Health (2020–present) Shadow Minister for Sport (2016–2020)
Jim Allister		TUV	2024	North Antrim (2024–present)	Leader of Traditional Unionist Voice (2007–present)
John Peter Allix		Conservative	1841	Cambridgeshire (1841–1847)	
Lewis Allsopp		Tory	1819	Camelford (1819)	Solicitor to Duchy of Cornwall (1822–1835)
Alfred Percy Allsopp		Conservative	1887	Taunton (1887–1895)	Mayor of Worcester (1892–1893, 1894–1895, 1909–1910)
George Allsopp		Conservative	1885	Worcester (1885–1906)	
Sir Henry Allsopp 1st Baronet of Hindlip Hall		Conservative	1874	East Worcestershire (1874–1880)	Later ennobled as Baron Hindlip
Samuel Allsopp 2nd Baronet of Hindlip Hall		Conservative	1873	East Staffordshire (1873–1880) Taunton (1882–1887)	Later ennobled as Baron Hindlip
Joseph Alpass		Labour	1929	Bristol Central (1929–1931) Thornbury (1945–1950)	
Cuthbert Alport		Conservative	1950	Colchester (1950–1961)	High Steward of Colchester (1967) British High Commissioner to the Federation of Rhodesia and Nyasaland (1961–1963) Minister of State for the Commonwealth Relations Office (1959–1961) Parliamentary Under-Secretary of State for Commonwealth Relations (1957–1959) Assistant Postmaster-General (1955–1957) Later ennobled as Baron Alport
Richard Alsager		Conservative	1835	East Surrey (1835–1841)	Died in office
Robert Alstead		Liberal	1923	Altrincham (1923–1924)	Mayor of Wigan (1926–1927)
David Alton		Liberal	1979	Liverpool Mossley Hill (1983–1988) Liverpool Edge Hill (1979–1983)	Liberal Chief Whip (1985–1987) Later ennobled as Baron Alton
David Alton		Liberal Democrats	1979	Liverpool Mossley Hill (1988–1997)	Liberal Chief Whip (1985–1987) Later ennobled as Baron Alton
Daniel Ambrose		Irish National Federation	1892	South Louth (1892–1896)	Died in office
Robert Ambrose		Irish National Federation	1893	West Mayo (1893–1910)	
Robert Ambrose		Irish Parliamentary Party	1893	West Mayo (1900–1910)	
Sir William Amcotts-Ingilby 2nd Baronet of Kettlethorpe Hall and Ripley Castle		Independent	1807	East Retford (1807–1812) Lincolnshire (1823–1832) North Lincolnshire (1832–1835)	High Sheriff of Yorkshire (1821)
Julian Amery		Conservative	1950	Preston North (1950–1966) Brighton Pavilion (1969–1992)	Minister of State for Foreign and Commonwealth Affairs (1972–1974) Minister for Housing and Construction (1970–1972) Minister of Public Buildings and Works (1970) Minister of Aviation (1962–1964) Secretary of State for Air (1960–1962) Under-Secretary of State for the Colonies (1958–1960) Later ennobled as Baron Amery of Lustleigh
Leo Amery		Liberal Unionist	1911	Birmingham South (1911–1912)	Secretary of State for India and Burma (1940–1945) Secretary of State for Dominion Affairs (1925–1929) Secretary of State for the Colonies (1924–1929) First Lord of the Admiralty (1922–1924) Under-Secretary of State for the Colonies (1919–1921)
Leo Amery		Unionist	1911	Birmingham South (1912–1918)	Secretary of State for India and Burma (1940–1945) Secretary of State for Dominion Affairs (1925–1929) Secretary of State for the Colonies (1924–1929) First Lord of the Admiralty (1922–1924) Under-Secretary of State for the Colonies (1919–1921)
Leo Amery		Conservative	1911	Birmingham Sparkbrook (1918–1945)	Secretary of State for India and Burma (1940–1945) Secretary of State for Dominion Affairs (1925–1929) Secretary of State for the Colonies (1924–1929) First Lord of the Admiralty (1922–1924) Under-Secretary of State for the Colonies (1919–1921)
Mike Amesbury		Labour	2017	Weaver Vale (2017–2024) Runcorn and Helsby (2024–2025)	Shadow Minister for Housing and Planning (2020–present) Shadow Minister for Employment (2018–2020)
Sir David Amess		Conservative	1983	Basildon (1983–1997) Southend West (1997–2021)	Killed in office
William Amherst 3rd Earl Amherst		Conservative	1859	West Kent (1859–1868) Mid Kent (1868–1880)	Pro Grand Master of the United Grand Lodge of England (1898–1908) Chairman of the National Union of Conservative and Constitutional Associations (1968) Later ennobled as Baron Amherst and Earl Amherst (Viscount Holmesdale)
William Pitt Amherst 2nd Earl Amherst		Ultra-Tories	1829	East Grinstead (1829–1832)	Later ennobled as Earl Amherst (Viscount Holmesdale) and Baron Amherst
Charles Ammon		Labour	1922	Camberwell North (1922–1931, 1935–1944)	Mayor of Camberwell (1950–1951) Captain of the Gentlemen-at-Arms (Government Chief Whip in the House of Lords) (1945–1949) Chairman of the London County Council (1941–1942) Parliamentary and Financial Secretary to the Admiralty (1924, 1929–1931) General Secretary of the National Union of Docks, Wharves and Shipping Staffs (1918–1919) Chair of the Fawcett Association (1911–1919) Later ennobled as Baron Ammon
Alan Amos		Conservative	1987	Hexham (1987–1992)	Mayor of Worcester (2014–2015)
Gideon Amos		Liberal Democrats	2024	Taunton and Wellington (2024–present)	
James Amyatt		Tory	1801	Southampton (1801–1806)	Also Member of Parliament of Great Britain
Michael Ancram		Conservative	1974	Berwick and East Lothian (1974) Edinburgh South (1979–1987) Devizes (1992–2010)	Shadow Secretary of State for Defence (2005) Shadow Secretary of State for Foreign and Commonwealth Affairs (2001–2005) Deputy Leader of the Conservative Party (2001–2005) Chair of the Conservative Party (1998–2001) Shadow Constitutional Affairs Spokesperson (1997–1998) Later ennobled as Marquess of Lothian
Alexander Anderson		Labour	1945	Motherwell (1945–1954)	
Sir Alan Anderson		Conservative	1935	City of London (1935–1940)	High Sheriff of the County of London (1922–1923) Controller of the Navy (1917–1918)
Callum Anderson		Labour	2024	Buckingham and Bletchley (2024–present)	
David Anderson		Conservative	1963	Dumfriesshire (1963–1964)	Solicitor General for Scotland (1960–1964)
David Anderson		Labour	2005	Blaydon (2005–2017)	Shadow Secretary of State for Northern Ireland (2016–2017) Shadow Secretary of State for Scotland (2016–2017)
Donald Anderson		Labour	1966	Monmouth (1966–1970) Swansea East (1974–2005)	Chair of the Foreign Affairs Select Committee (1997–2005) Later ennobled as Baron Anderson of Swansea
Fleur Anderson		Labour	2019	Putney (2019–present)	Shadow Parliamentary Secretary to the Cabinet Office (2021–present)
Frank Anderson		Labour	1935	Whitehaven (1935–1959)	
George Knox Anderson		Conservative	1918	Canterbury (1918–1918)	
Hugh Anderson		Irish Unionist	1918	North Londonderry (1918–1919)	High Sheriff of County Londonderry (1919)
Janet Anderson		Labour	1992	Rossendale and Darwen (1992–2010)	Parliamentary Under-Secretary of State for Film, Tourism and Broadcasting (1998–2001) Vice-Chamberlain of the Household (1997–1998) Shadow Minister for Women (1996–1997)
Sir John Anderson 1st Baronet of Mill Hill		Tory	1801	London (1801–1806)	Also Member of Parliament of Great Britain
John Anderson 1st Viscount Waverly		National	1938	Combined Scottish Universities (1938–1950)	Chancellor of the Exchequer (1943–1945) Lord President of the Council (1940–1943) Minister of Home Security (1939–1940) Home Secretary (1939–1940) Governor of Bengal (1932–1937) Permanent Under-Secretary for the Home Department (1922–1932) Joint Permanent Under-Secretary to the Lord Lieutenant of Ireland (1920–1922) Later ennobled as Viscount Waverley
Lee Anderson		Conservative	2019	Ashfield (2019–2024)	
Lee Anderson		Reform UK	2019	Ashfield (2024–present)	
Stuart Anderson		Conservative	2019	Wolverhampton South West (2019–2024) South Shropshire (2024–present)	
William Crawford Anderson		Labour	1914	Sheffield Attercliffe (1914–1918)	Chair of the Labour Party (1914–1916) Chairman of the Independent Labour Party (1911–1913)
Charles Anderson-Pelham 2nd Earl of Yarborough		Whig	1830	Newtown (1830–1831) Lincolnshire (1831–1832) North Lincolnshire (1832–1847)	Lord Lieutenant of Lincolnshire (1857–1862) Vice-Admiral of Lincolnshire (1853–1862) Later ennobled as Earl of Yarborough
Charles Anderson-Pelham 3rd Earl of Yarborough		Whig	1857	Great Grimsby (1857–1859)	Later ennobled as Earl of Yarborough
Charles Anderson-Pelham 3rd Earl of Yarborough		Liberal	1857	Great Grimsby (1859–1862)	Later ennobled as Earl of Yarborough
George Anderson-Pelham		Whig	1806	Great Grimsby (1806–1807) Newtown (Isle of Wight) (1808–1820)	High Steward of Grimsby (1815)
Stuart Andrew		Conservative	2010	Pudsey (2010–2024) Daventry (2024–present)	Deputy Chief Whip of the House of Commons (2020–2022) Treasurer of the Household (2020–2022) Vice-Chamberlain of the Household (2019–20) Parliamentary Under-Secretary of State for Defence Procurement (2018–19) Parliamentary Under-Secretary of State for Wales (2018)
Miles Peter Andrews		Tory	1801	Bewdley (1801–1814)	Also Member of Parliament of Great Britain
Sir Norman Angell		Labour	1929	Bradford North (1929–1931)	
John Angerstein		Whig	1801	Camelford (1801–1802) Greenwich (1835–1837)	High Sheriff of Norfolk (1831–1832) Also Member of Parliament of Great Britain
William Angerstein		Liberal	1859	Greenwich (1859–1865)	
James Annand		Liberal	1906	East Aberdeenshire (1906–1906)	
Arthur Annesley 11th Viscount Valentia		Conservative	1895	Oxford (1895–1917)	Comptroller of the Household (1898–1905) Later ennobled as Viscount Valentia and Baron Annesley of Bletchington
Francis Annesley		Tory	1801	Reading (1801–1806)	Also Member of Parliament of Great Britain
George Annesley 2nd Earl of Mountnorris; 9th Viscount Valentia		Independent	1808	Yarmouth (1808–1810)	Later ennobled as Viscount Valentia and Earl of Mountnorris
George Annesley		Tory	1830	County Wexford (1830–1831)	Later ennobled as Viscount Valentia
Hugh Annesley 5th Earl Annesley		Tory	1857	County Cavan (1857–1874)	Representative Peer of Ireland (1877–1908) Later ennobled as Earl Annesley
William Annesley 3rd Earl Annesley		Tory	1815	Downpatrick (1815–1820)	High Sheriff of Down (1822) Later ennobled as Earl Annesley and Viscount Glerawly
William Annesley 4th Earl Annesley		Conservative	1852	Great Grimsby (1852–1857)	Representative Peer for Ireland (1867–1874) Later ennobled as Earl Annesley and Viscount Glerawly
Caroline Ansell		Conservative	2015	Eastbourne (2015–2017, 2019–2024)	
Augustus Anson		Liberal	1859	Lichfield (1859–1868) Bewdley (1869–1874)	
George Anson		Whig	1818	Great Yarmouth (1818–1835) Stoke-upon-Trent (1836–1837) Staffordshire South (1837–1853)	Commander-in-Chief of the British Indian Army (1856) Commander-in-Chief of the Madras Army (1854–1856) Clerk of the Ordnance (1841, 1846–1852) Storekeeper of the Ordnance (1835–1841)
Sir George Anson		Whig	1806	Lichfield (1806–1841)	Governor of the Royal Hospital Chelsea (1849) Colonel of the 4th Royal Irish Dragoon Guards (1829–1849)
Thomas Anson 1st Earl of Litchfield		Whig	1818	Great Yarmouth (1818–1819)	Postmaster General (1835–1841) Master of the Buckhounds (1830–1834) Later ennobled as Earl of Lichfield and Viscount Anson
Thomas Anson 2nd Earl of Litchfield		Whig	1847	Lichfield (1847–1854)	Lord-Lieutenant of Staffordshire (1863–1871) Later ennobled as Earl of Lichfield
Thomas Anson 1st Viscount Anson		Whig	1801	Lichfield (1801–1806)	Also Member of Parliament of Great Britain Later ennobled as Viscount Anson and Baron Soberton
Sir William Anson 3rd Baronet of Hatch Beauchamp		Liberal Unionist	1899	Oxford University (1899–1914)	Parliamentary Secretary to the Board of Education (1902–1905) Vice-Chancellor of Oxford University (1898–1899) Warden of All Souls College, Oxford (1881–1914)
Sir William Anson 3rd Baronet of Hatch Beauchamp		Conservative	1899	Oxford University (1912–1914)	Parliamentary Secretary to the Board of Education (1902–1905) Vice-Chancellor of Oxford University (1898–1899) Warden of All Souls College, Oxford (1881–1914)
Henry Torrens Anstruther		Liberal Unionist	1886	St Andrews Burghs (1886–1903)	
Sir John Anstruther 1st Baronet of Elie; 4th Baronet of Anstruther		Independent	1806	Anstruther Burghs (1806–1811)	Also Member of Parliament of Great Britain
Sir Robert Anstruther 5th Baronet of Wrae, Balcaskie & Braemore		Liberal	1864	Fife (1864–1880)	Lord Lieutenant of Fife (1864–1886)
Sir Robert Anstruther 5th Baronet of Wrae, Balcaskie & Braemore		Independent Liberal	1864	St Andrews Burghs (1885–1886)	Lord Lieutenant of Fife (1864–1886)
Sir Robert Anstruther 5th Baronet of Wrae, Balcaskie & Braemore		Liberal Unionist	1864	St Andrews Burghs (1886–1886)	Lord Lieutenant of Fife (1864–1886)
William Anstruther-Gray		Liberal Unionist	1906	St Andrews Burghs (1906–1910, 1910–1918)	
William Anstruther-Gray 1st Baronet of Kilmany		Unionist	1931	North Lanarkshire (1931–1945) Berwick and East Lothian (1951–1966)	Lord Lieutenant of Fife (1975–1980) Chairman of the 1922 Committee (1964–1966) Chairman of Ways and Means (1962–1964) Deputy Speaker of the House of Commons (1962–1964) Assistant Postmaster-General (1945) Later ennobled as Baron Kilmany
Tonia Antoniazzi		Labour	2017	Gower (2017–present)	Shadow Minister for Northern Ireland (2021–present)
Sir Edmund Antrobus 3rd Baronet of Antrobus Hall		Conservative	1841	East Surrey (1841–1847)	
Sir Edmund Antrobus 3rd Baronet of Antrobus Hall		Peelite	1841	Wilton (1855–1859)	
Sir Edmund Antrobus 3rd Baronet of Antrobus Hall		Liberal	1841	Wilton (1859–1877)	
Gibbs Antrobus		Tory	1820	Aldborough (1820–1826) Plympton Erle (1826–1832)	Sheriff of Cheshire (1934–1935)
Reginald Applin		Conservative	1924	Enfield (1924–1929, 1931–1935)	
Steffan Aquarone		Liberal Democrats	2024	North Norfolk (2024–present)	
Charles Arbuthnot		Tory	1809	Eye (1809–1812) Orford (1812–1818) St Germans (1818–1827) St Ives (1828–1830) Ashburton (1830–1831)	Chancellor of the Duchy of Lancaster (1828–1830) First Commissioner of Woods and Forests (1823–1827, 1828) Joint Secretary to the Treasury (1809–1823) Ambassador to the Ottoman Empire (1804–07) Under-Secretary of State for Foreign Affairs (1803–1804) Ambassador to Sweden (1802–1804) Also Member of Parliament of Great Britain
Charles George James Arbuthnot		Tory	1831	Tregony (1831–1832)	Colonel of the 72nd Regiment of Foot (1870) Colonel of the 91st Regiment of Foot (1864–1870) Colonel of the 89th Regiment of Foot (1857–1864) Page of Honour (1812–17)
Gerald Arbuthnot		Conservative	1910	Burnley (1910–1910)	
Sir Hugh Arbuthnott		Tory	1826	Kincardineshire (1826–1835)	Colonel of the 79th Regiment of Foot (1862–1868) Colonel of the 38th Regiment of Foot (1843–1862)
Sir Hugh Arbuthnott		Conservative	1826	Kincardineshire (1935–1865)	Colonel of the 79th Regiment of Foot (1862–1868) Colonel of the 38th Regiment of Foot (1843–1862)
James Arbuthnot		Conservative	1987	Wanstead and Woodford (1987–1997) North East Hampshire (1997–2015)	Chairman of the Defence Select Committee (2005–2014) Shadow Secretary of State for Trade (2003–2005) Opposition Chief Whip of the House of Commons (1997–2001) Minister of State for Defence Procurement (1995–1997) Parliamentary Under-Secretary of State for Social Security (1994–1995) Later ennobled as Baron Arbuthnot of Edrom
Sir John Arbuthnot 1st Baronet of Kittybrewster		Conservative	1950	Dover (1950–1964)	
Andrew Arcedeckne		Independent	1826	Dunwich (1826–1831)	High Sheriff of Suffolk (1819–20)
Joseph Arch		Liberal	1885	North West Norfolk (1885–1886, 1892–1900)	President of the National Agricultural Labourers' Union (1872–?)
Sir Edward Archdale 1st Baronet of Riversdale		Irish Unionist	1898	North Fermanagh (1898–1903, 1916–1921)	Grand Master of the Orange Institution of Ireland (1926–1941) Minister of Agriculture of Northern Ireland (1921–1933) Minister of Commerce of Northern Ireland (1921–1925) Lord Lieutenant of Tyrone (1913–16) Also a Member of Parliament of Northern Ireland
Sir Edward Archdale 1st Baronet of Riversdale		Ulster Unionist	1898	North Fermanagh (1921–1922)	Grand Master of the Orange Institution of Ireland (1926–1941) Minister of Agriculture of Northern Ireland (1921–1933) Minister of Commerce of Northern Ireland (1921–1925) Lord Lieutenant of Tyrone (1913–16) Also a Member of Parliament of Northern Ireland
Mervyn Edward Archdale		Tory	1834	Fermanagh (1834–1834)	High Sheriff of Fermanagh (1879)
Mervyn Edward Archdale		Conservative	1834	Fermanagh (1834–1874)	High Sheriff of Fermanagh (1879)
William Humphrys Archdale		Conservative	1874	Fermanagh (1874–1885)	High Sheriff of Tyrone (1861) High Sheriff of Fermanagh (1835)
Mervyn Archdall		Tory	1801	Fermanagh (1801–1802)	High Sheriff of Fermanagh (1773–1774) Governor of Fermanagh (1756) Also a Member of Parliament of Ireland
Mervyn Archdall		Tory	1802	Fermanagh (1802–1834)	Lieutenant-Governor of the Isle of Wight (1915–1938) Grand Master of the Orange Order (1818–1822) Governor of County Fermanagh (1813–1831)
Richard Archdall		Independent	1802	Kilkenny City (1802–1802)	Also Member of Irish House of Commons
Richard Archdall		Tory	1802	Dundalk (1802–1806)	Also Member of Irish House of Commons
Jeffrey Archer		Conservative	1969	Louth (1969–1974)	Later ennobled as Baron Archer of Weston-super-Mare
Peter Archer		Labour	1966	Rowley Regis and Tipton (1966–1974) Warley West (1974–1992)	President of the Fabian Society (1993–2012) Shadow Secretary of State for Northern Ireland (1983–1987) Shadow Secretary of State for Trade (1982–1983) Shadow Attorney General (1981–1982) Chairman of the Fabian Society (1979–1980) Solicitor General for England and Wales (1974–1979) Later ennobled as Baron Archer of Sandwell
John Archer-Houblon		Independent	1810	Essex (1810–1820)	High Sheriff of Essex (1801–1802)
Sir Martin Archer-Shee		Conservative	1910	Finsbury Central (1910–1918) Finsbury (1918–1923)	
Sir Richard Pepper Arden		Whig	1801	Bath (1801)	Chief Justice of the Common Pleas (1801–1804) Master of the Rolls (1788–1801) Attorney General for England and Wales (1784–1788) Later ennobled as Baron Alvanley
Edward Argar		Conservative	2015	Charnwood (2015–2024) Melton and Syston (2024–present)	
Richard Arkless		SNP	2015	Dumfries and Galloway (2015–2017)	
Augustus Arkwright		Conservative	1868	North Derbyshire (1868–1880)	
Francis Arkwright		Conservative	1874	East Derbyshire (1874–1880)	
Richard Arkwright		Tory	1813	Rye (1813–1818, 1826–1830)	
Benjamin Armitage		Liberal	1813	Salford (1880–1885) Salford West (1885–1886)	
Robert Armitage		Liberal	1906	Leeds Central (1906–1922)	Lord Mayor of Leeds (1904–1905)
Colonel C. W. Armstrong		UUP	1954	Armagh (1954–1959)	
Ernest Armstrong		Labour	1964	North West Durham (1964–1987)	
Henry Bruce Wright Armstrong		UUP	1921	Mid Armagh (1921–1922)	Lord Lieutenant of Armagh (1924–1939)
Hilary Armstrong		Labour	1987	North West Durham (1987–2010)	Later ennobled as Baroness Armstrong of Hill Top
Sir Alfred Arnold		Conservative	1895	Halifax (1895–1900)	
Jacques Arnold		Conservative	1987	Gravesham (1987–1997)	
Sir Tom Arnold		Conservative	1974	Hazel Grove (1974–1997)	
Hugh Oakeley Arnold-Forster		Liberal Unionist	1892	Belfast West (1892–1906) Croydon (1906–1909)	Secretary of State for War (1903–1905)
Sir William Arrol		Liberal Unionist	1895	South Ayrshire (1895–1906)	
Scott Arthur		Labour	2024	Edinburgh South West (2024–present)	
Paddy Ashdown		Liberal	1983	Yeovil (1983–1988)	Leader of the Liberal Democrats (1988–1999) High Representative for Bosnia and Herzegovina (2002–2006) Later ennobled as Baron Ashdown of Norton-sub-Hamdon
Paddy Ashdown		Liberal Democrats	1983	Yeovil (1988–2001)	Leader of the Liberal Democrats (1988–1999) High Representative for Bosnia and Herzegovina (2002–2006) Later ennobled as Baron Ashdown of Norton-sub-Hamdon
H. H. Asquith		Liberal	1886	East Fife (1886–1918) Paisley (1920–1924)	Prime Minister of the United Kingdom (1908–1916) Chancellor of the Exchequer (1905–1908) Home Secretary (1892–1895) Secretary of State for War (1914) Leader of the Liberal Party (1908–1926) Later ennobled as Earl of Oxford and Asquith
Clement Attlee		Labour	1922	Limehouse (1922–1950) Walthamstow West (1950–1955)	Prime Minister of the United Kingdom (1945–1951) Deputy Prime Minister of the United Kingdom (1942–1945) Leader of the Labour Party (1935–1955) Later ennobled as Earl Attlee

- AS
- George Ashburnham, Viscount St Asaph
- Percy Ashburnham, MP for Bere Alston (1825–1830)
- David Ashby MP for North West Leicestershire (1983–1997)
- William Henry Ashhurst, MP for Oxfordshire (1815 - 1830)
- Anthony John Ashley, MP for Gatton (1831–1832)
- Wilfrid Ashley, MP for Blackpool (1906–1918), Fylde (1918–1922) and New Forest and Christchurch (1922–1932)
- Jack Ashley, Baron Ashley of Stoke (1966–1992)
- Anthony Ashley-Cooper, 7th Earl of Shaftesbury
- Cropley Ashley-Cooper, 6th Earl of Shaftesbury
- Henry Ashley-Cooper
- William Ashley-Cooper
- Sir Ellis Ashmead-Bartlett, MP for Eye (1880–1885) and Sheffield Ecclesall (1885–1902)
- Ellis Ashmead-Bartlett, MP for Hammersmith North (1924–1926)
- Sir Hubert Ashton, MP for Chelmsford (1950–1964)
- Joe Ashton (1968–2001)
- Thomas Ashton
- Sir Robert Aske, Newcastle upon Tyne East, 1923–1924, 1929–1931
- Jack Aspinwall (1979–1997)
- John Aspinall, MP for Clitheroe (1853)
- Jonathan Ashworth, Leicester South, 2011–present
- Ralph Assheton, MP for Clitheroe (1868–1880)
- Ralph Assheton, MP for Rushcliffe (1934–1945), City of London (1945–1950) and Blackburn West (1950–1955)
- Fred Astbury
- John Harvey Astell, MP for Cambridge (1852–1853) and Ashburton (1859–1865)
- William Astell
- Sir Edward Astley, 4th Baronet
- Sir Jacob Astley, 5th Baronet
- Sir John Astley, 1st Baronet
- Sir John Dugdale Astley, 3rd Baronet, MP for North Lincolnshire (1874–1880)
- Sir John Astor, MP for Plymouth Sutton (1951–1959)
- John Astor, MP for Newbury (1964–1974)
- John Jacob Astor, 1st Baron Astor of Hever (1922–1945)
- Michael Astor MP for East Surrey (1945–1951)
- Nancy Astor, Viscountess Astor (1919–1945)
- Waldorf Astor, 2nd Viscount Astor (1910–1919)
- William Astor, 3rd Viscount Astor (1935–1945,1951–1952)
- H. H. Asquith, East Fife 1886–1918, Paisley, 1920–1924
- AT
- Arthur Atherley (1806–1807, 1812–1818, 1831–1835)
- Candy Atherton, Falmouth and Camborne, 1997–2005
- Llewellyn Atherley-Jones
- Albert Atkey, MP for Nottingham Central (1918–1922)
- Charlotte Atkins (1997–2010)
- Humphrey Atkins (1955–1987)
- John Atkins, MP for Arundel 1802–1806, 1826–1832, and for the City of London in 1812–1818
- Sir Robert Atkins, MP for Preston North (1979–1983) and South Ribble (1983–1997)
- Ronald Atkins, Preston North, 1966–1970, 1974–1979
- Victoria Atkins, MP for Louth and Horncastle (2015–present)
- Sir Cyril Atkinson, MP for Altrincham (1924–1933)
- David Atkinson, MP for Bournemouth East (1977–2005)
- Henry Atkinson, (1885–1886, 1886–1892)
- Norman Atkinson, Tottenham, 1964–1987
- Peter Atkinson, MP for Hexham (1992–2010)
- John Atkyns-Wright, MP for Oxford (1802–1807, 1812–1820)
- Walter Annis Attenborough, MP for Bedford
- John Attersoll, MP for Wootton Bassett (1812–1813)
- Humphrey Attewell (1945–1950)
- Clement Attlee (1922–1956)
- John Attwood, MP for Harwich (1841–1847)
- Matthias Attwood, MP for Whitehaven (1834–1837)
- Thomas Attwood, Radical MP
- Matthias Wolverley Attwood, MP for Greenwich (1837–1841)
- AU
- Sir John Aubrey, 6th Baronet
- Sir Henry Aubrey-Fletcher, 4th Baronet, MP for Horsham (1880–1885) and Lewes (1885–1910)
- Thomas Austen, MP for West Kent (1845–1847)
- David Austick, Ripon, 1973–1974
- Sir Herbert Austin, 1st Baron Austin, MP for Birmingham King's Norton (1918–1924)
- Herschel Lewis Austin, Stretford, 1945–1950
- Ian Austin, Baron Austin (2005–2019)
- Sir John Austin
- John Austin (1992–2010)
- AW
- Stan Awbery (1945–1964)
- Daniel Awdry, MP for Chippenham (1962–1979)
- AY
- Walter Ayles (1923–1924, 1929–1931, 1945–1953)
- Acton Smee Ayrton, (1857–1874)
- Barbara Ayrton-Gould, Hendon North, 1945–1950

Out of Order to Add

- William à Court, 2nd Baronet of Heytesbury
