= John Feeney (newspaper proprietor) =

British newspaper publisher and philanthropist

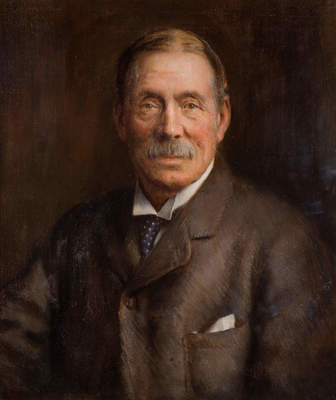
Portrait of John Feeney by Lance Calkin, 1906

John Feeney (1839, in Sparkbrook, Birmingham – 3 May 1905), was a newspaper proprietor and philanthropist, and a proprietor of the Birmingham Post, in partnership with John Jaffray (later Sir John Jaffray, 1st Baronet) in succession to his father John Frederick Feeney.

He was the second son of his father. In his will, he left most of his considerable fortune to charity, mostly for the benefit of the City of Birmingham. By this or in his lifetime:

- He provided £50,000 to provide a further gallery for Birmingham Museum and Art Gallery.
- He gave £20,000 to endow a professorship at the University of Birmingham, which became that in metallurgy .
- He gave 9% of the residue to establish the John Feeney Charitable Trust, which exists for the benefit of:
  - The Public Charities in the City of Birmingham
  - The promotion and cultivation of Art in the city
  - The acquisition and manitenace of public parks, recreation ground, and open spaces in or near the city.

Feeney was married to Christina.

== Archives ==
Scores of musical works commissioned by the John Feeney Charitable Trust are held at the Cadbury Research Library, University of Birmingham.
