= George Allsopp (British politician) =

British politician (1846–1907)

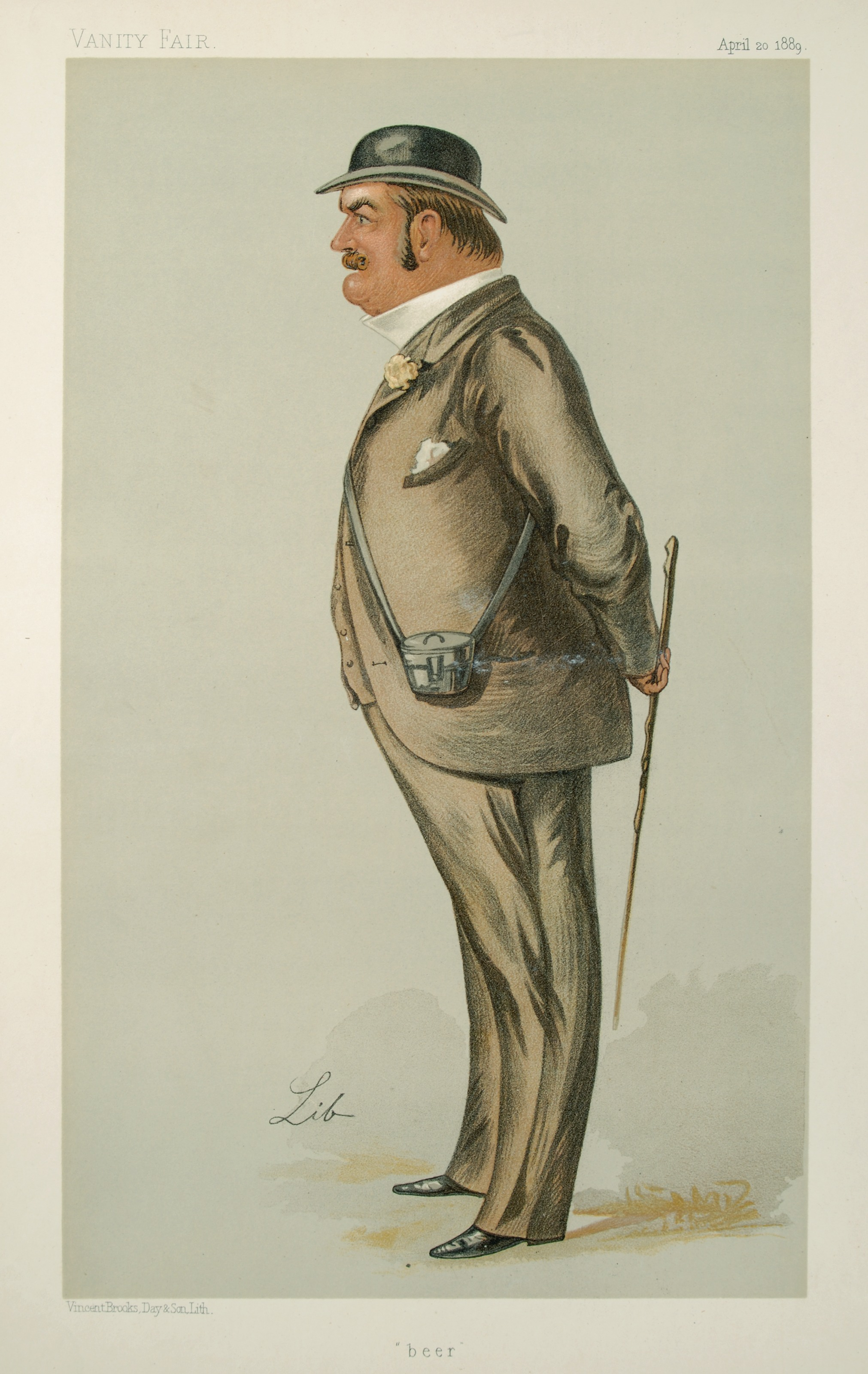
George Higginson Allsopp in 1889

George Higginson Allsopp (28 March 1846 – 9 September 1907) was an English brewer and Conservative politician who sat in the House of Commons from 1885 to 1906.

== Biography ==
Allsopp was born at Burton-on-Trent, the son of Henry Allsopp, head of the brewery firm of Samuel Allsopp & Sons and his wife Elizabeth Tongue. He was educated at Eton and Trinity College, Cambridge and entered the family brewery. Between 1868 and 1871 he appeared in cricket matches for Worcestershire, although they did not qualify as first class. Allsopp was a J.P. and Deputy Lieutenant for Staffordshire and Derbyshire. He was at one time chairman of the Burton-on-Trent School Board

Allsopp stood unsuccessfully for parliament at Droitwich in 1880. At the 1885 general election, he was elected as Member of Parliament for Worcester. He held the seat until he retired from politics at the 1906 election.

Allsopp lived at Foston Hall, Derby and at 8, Hereford Gardens, Park Lane. He died at Salisbury at the age of 61.

Allsopp married Mildred Georgiana Ashley-Cooper daughter of Anthony Ashley-Cooper, 8th Earl of Shaftesbury, in 1895. His brother Samuel was also MP for Taunton, and his brothers Herbert and Frederic were also cricketers who played in first class games.

== See also ==
- Beerage

Parliament of the United Kingdom
Preceded by Aeneas John McIntyre; Thomas Rowley Hill	Member of Parliament for Worcester; 1885 – 1906	Succeeded by George Henry Williamson
