= Hyde baronets =

Extinct baronetcy in the Baronetage of the United Kingdom

There have been two baronetcies created for persons with the surname Hyde. Both are extinct.

== Hyde baronets, of Aldbury (1621) ==
- Sir Nicholas Hyde, 1st Baronet (1561–1625)
- Sir Thomas Hyde, 2nd Baronet (abt 1597–1665)

The Hyde Baronetcy, of Aldbury in the County of Hertford, was created in the Baronetage of England on 8 November 1621 for Nicholas Hyde, Sheriff of Hertfordshire for 1619. The baronetcy became extinct on the death in 1665 of the second Baronet, also sheriff of Hertfordshire (1628).

== Hyde baronets, of Birmingham (1922) ==
- Sir Charles Hyde, OBE, 1st Baronet (1876–1942)

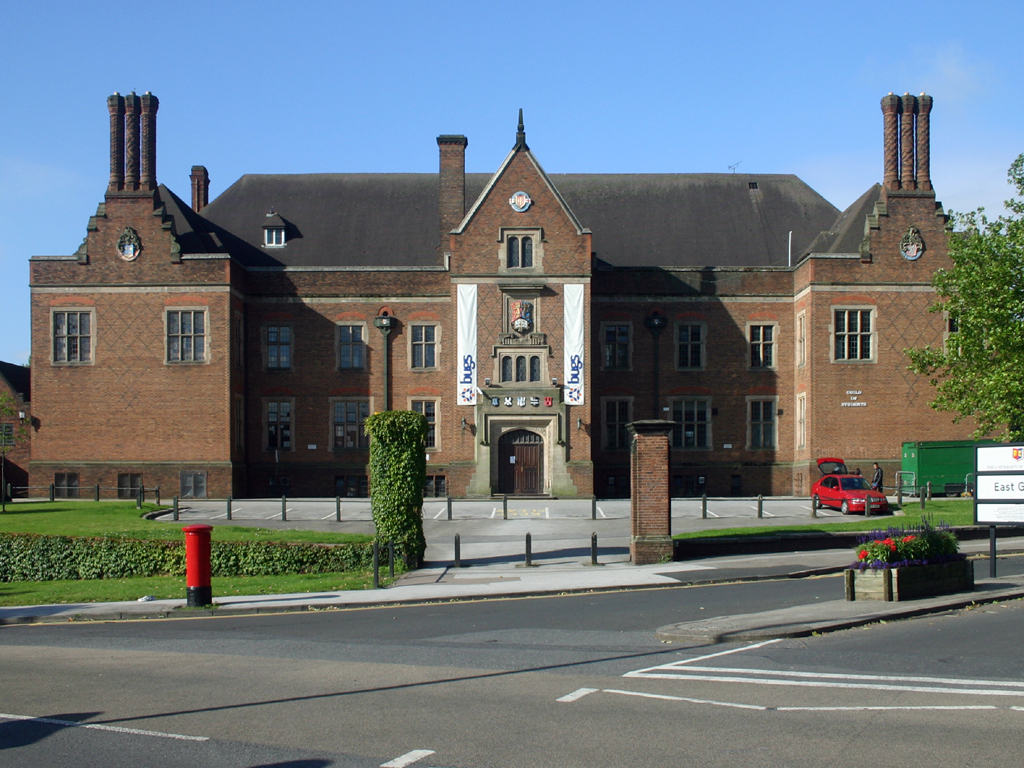
Birmingham University Guild of Students

The Hyde Baronetcy, of Birmingham, was created in the Baronetage of the United Kingdom on 19 January 1921 for the newspaper proprietor Charles Hyde, of Berkswell, Warwickshire. He was the grandson of John Frederick Feeney founder of the Birmingham Post. He was born at Worcester, the son of a surgeon, and was educated at Clifton and Exeter College, Oxford. He became the proprietor in 1905 on the death of his uncle John Feeney. He was appointed an Officer of the Order of the British Empire (OBE) in 1920. He was High Sheriff of Warwickshire in 1933. The title became extinct on his death in 1942.

Sir Charles Hyde was a great benefactor to the University of Birmingham. In 1925 he gave £100,000, part of which was to be devoted to the building of the Birmingham University Students' Union building. He contributed £10,000 to the Birmingham University appeal fund in 1920. He bought and equipped a hostel for men undergraduates, known as Chancellor's Hall. He also gave £10,000 in 1936 for a Joseph Chamberlain Memorial Museum in Birmingham University's Medical School.

From 1924 until 1927 he was Commodore of Midland Sailing Club, succeeding Neville Chamberlain.

Baronetage of England
New creation	Baronet (of Albury); 1621–1625	Succeeded by Thomas Hyde
