= Sir John Jaffray, 1st Baronet =

Scottish journalist and newspaper proprietor

Sir John Jaffray
- Baronet Jaffray of Skilts
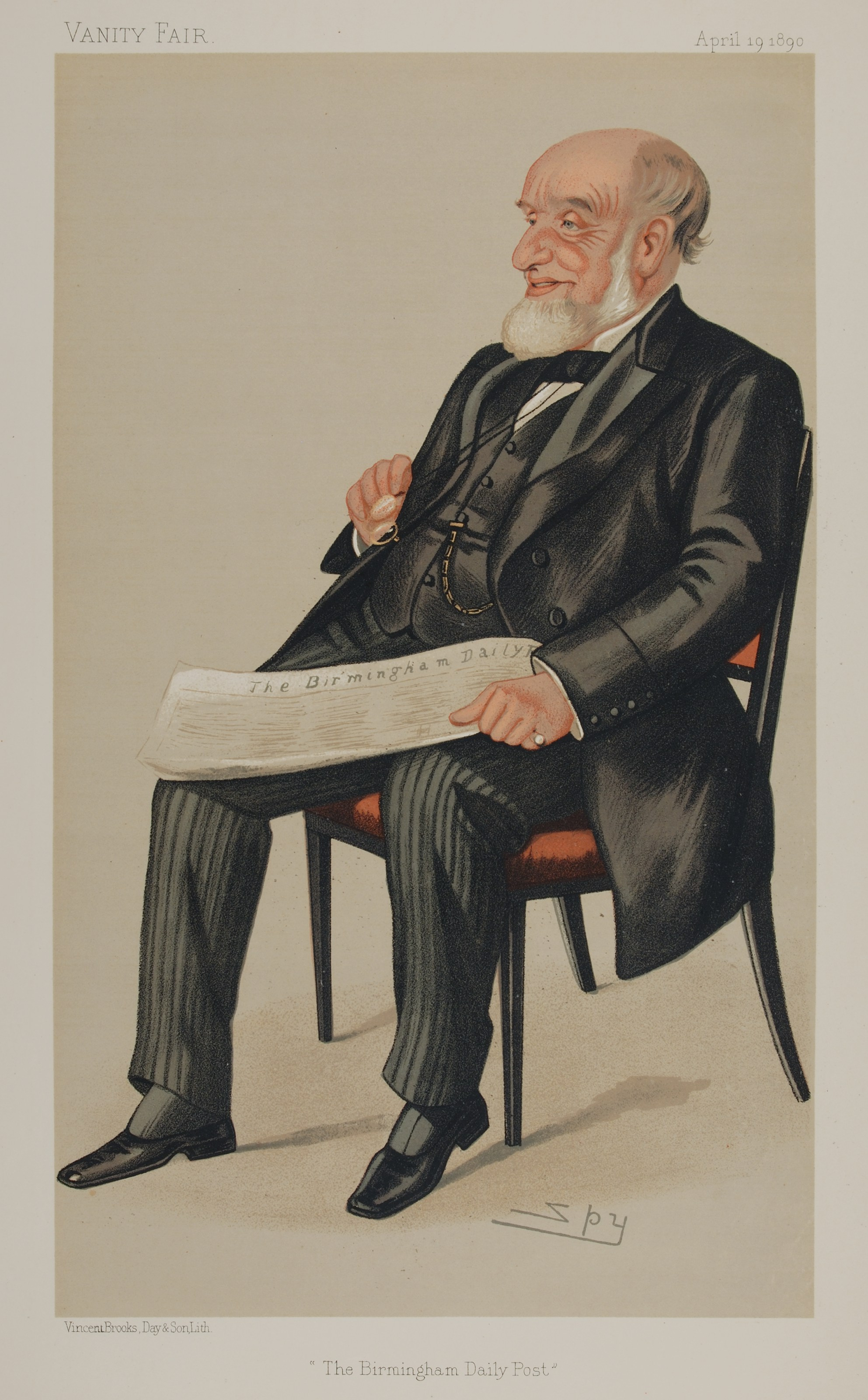
- Jaffray as caricatured by Spy in Vanity Fair, April 1890

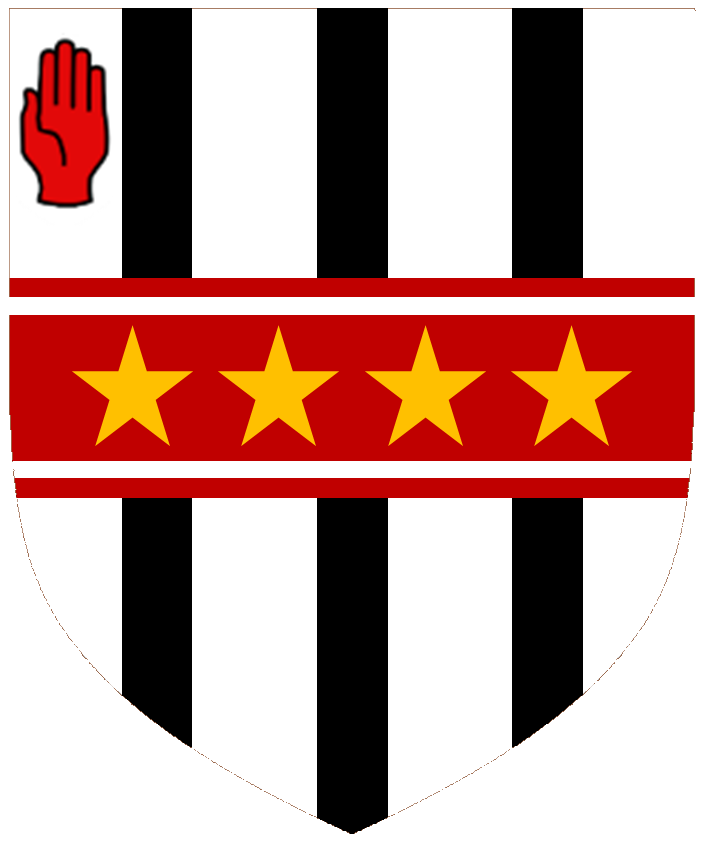
- Coat of arms
- Tenure: 1892–1901
- Predecessor: New creation
- Successor: Sir William Jaffray, 2nd Baronet
- Born: 11 October 1818; Stirling
- Died: 4 January 1901 (aged 82)

Sir John Jaffray, 1st Baronet (11 October 1818 – 4 January 1901) was a Scottish journalist and newspaper proprietor.

Born in Stirling, he moved to Birmingham in 1844, to work for John Frederick Feeney on the Birmingham Journal, and became a partner in it in 1852. Together they founded the Birmingham Daily Post, (now Birmingham Post) in 1857. He founded the Birmingham Mail with Feeney's son John Feeney in 1870.

He was president of Birmingham General Hospital and founded Birmingham's Jaffray Hospital.

In an 1873 by-election, he stood for the parliamentary seat for East Staffordshire, as a Liberal, but was defeated by 2,893 votes to 3.630 by the Conservative candidate, Samuel Allsopp.

He served as High Sheriff of Warwickshire in 1888 and was created a Baronet, of Skilts in Studley in the County of Warwick, in 1892, taking his title from the estate he had bought there.

Baronetage of the United Kingdom
New creation	Baronet (of Skilts); 1892–1901	Succeeded by William Jaffray
