= Samuel Allsopp, 2nd Baron Hindlip =

British businessman and politician

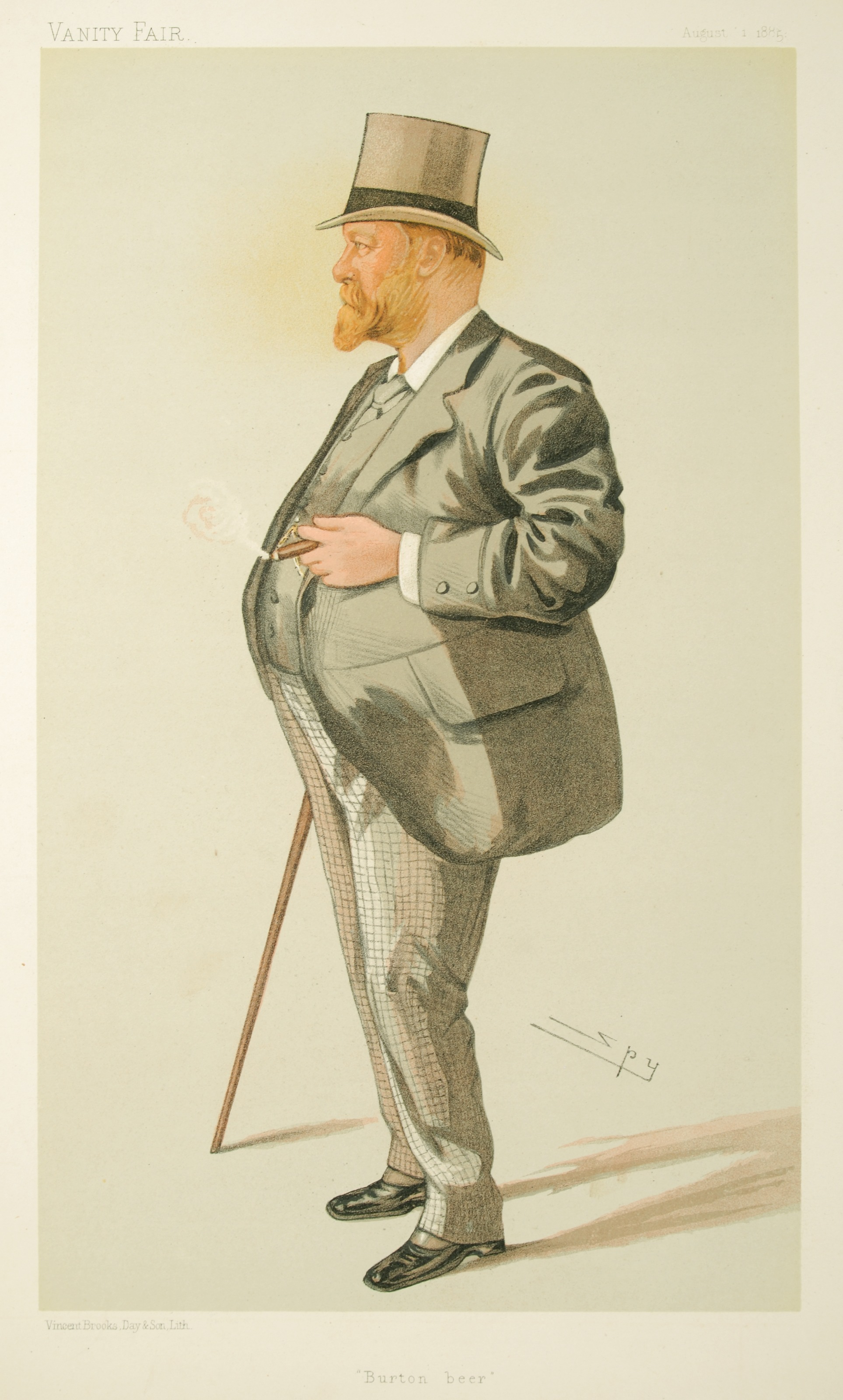
Caricature by "Spy" (Leslie Ward) published in Vanity Fair in 1885

Samuel Charles Allsopp, 2nd Baron Hindlip (24 March 1842 – 12 July 1897), was a British businessman and Conservative politician who sat in the House of Commons between 1873 and 1887 when he inherited the peerage.

== Life and career ==
Allsopp was the eldest son of Henry Allsopp, 1st Baron Hindlip, head of the brewery firm of Samuel Allsopp & Sons, of Burton-on-Trent, and his wife Elizabeth Tongue. He was educated at Harrow School and Trinity College, Cambridge, and was a lieutenant in the Derbyshire Yeomanry. In 1880, he took over the running of the brewery. He was also deputy chairman of the Great Northern Railway.

In 1873, Allsopp was elected Member of Parliament for Staffordshire East and held the seat until 1880. He became a deputy lieutenant of Staffordshire in 1876. He was elected MP for Taunton in 1882. In 1887 he succeeded his father as second Baron Hindlip and gave up his seat when he entered the House of Lords.

Lord Hindlip died in July 1897, aged 55.

== Family ==
Hindlip married Georgiana Millicent, daughter of Charles Rowland Palmer-Moorewood, in 1868. He was succeeded in his titles by his son Charles. Lady Hindlip died in 1939. His brother George was MP for Worcester, while other brothers Frederic and Herbert were first-class cricketers.

== Coat of arms ==
Coat of arms of Samuel Allsopp, 2nd Baron Hindlip
Coronet A coronet of a Baron Crest A Plover holding in the beak a Wheat-ear Or standing on a Pheon also Gold Escutcheon Sable three Pheons in chevron Or between as many Doves rising Argent each holding in the beak a Wheat-ear Or Supporters On either side a Foxhound gorged with a Pair of Couples proper Motto Festina Lente (Hasten slowly)

== See also ==
- Beerage

Parliament of the United Kingdom
Preceded by Michael Bass; John Robinson McClean	Member of Parliament for East Staffordshire; 1873–1880; With: Michael Bass	Succeeded by Michael Bass; Henry Wiggin
Preceded by Henry James; Sir William Palliser	Member of Parliament for Taunton; 1882–1887; With: Henry James 1882–1885	Succeeded by Alfred Percy Allsopp
Peerage of the United Kingdom
Preceded by Henry Allsopp	Baron Hindlip; 1887–1897	Succeeded by Charles Allsopp
Baronetage of the United Kingdom
Preceded by Henry Allsopp	Baronet of Hindlip Hall; 1887–1897	Succeeded by Charles Allsopp
