= Jaffray baronets =

Baronetcy in the Baronetage of the United Kingdom

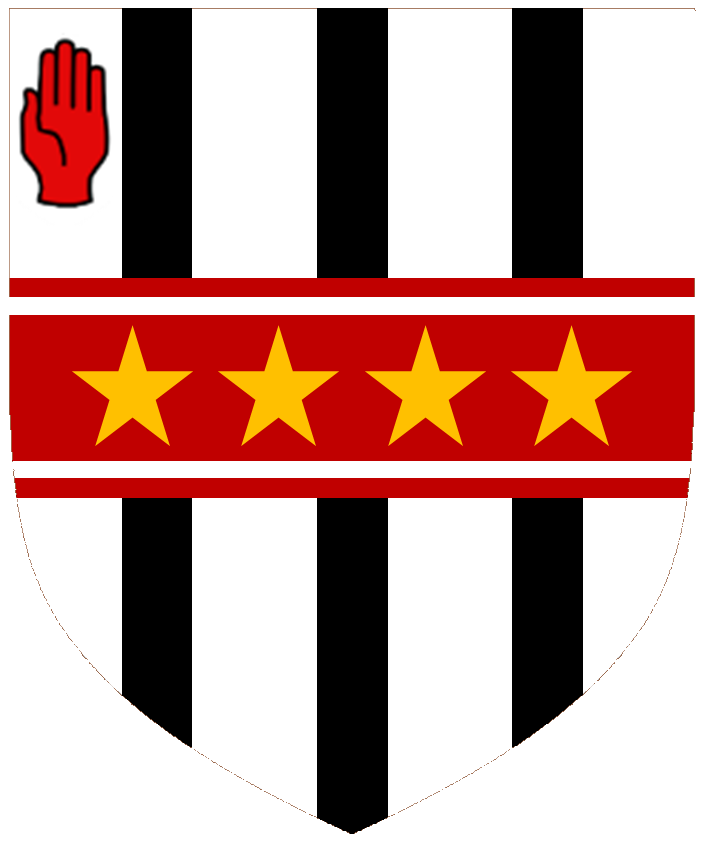
Argent three Pallets Sable on a Fess cotised Gules four Mullets Or

The Jaffray Baronetcy, of Skilts in the Parish of Studley in the County of Warwick, is a title in the Baronetage of the United Kingdom. It was created on 8 October 1892 for the journalist and newspaper proprietor John Jaffray. He was the co-founder of the Birmingham Post and Birmingham Mail.

The 2nd Baronet was High Sheriff of Warwickshire in 1906. The 4th Baronet, Sir William Edmund Jaffray, was a Colonel in the Warwickshire Yeomanry and a deputy lieutenant of Warwickshire.

The 5th Baronet succeeded to the title as an infant on his father's death. He was educated at Eton and in 1981 married Cynthia Ross Corrington, a daughter of John Corrington III, of Montreal. They had three sons and a daughter but later divorced. Nicholas Gordon Alexander Jaffray (born 1982) became the 6th Baronet, upon the death of his father in 2026.

== Jaffray baronets, of Skilts (1892) ==
- Sir John Jaffray, 1st Baronet (1818–1901)
- Sir William Jaffray, 2nd Baronet (1852–1914), married Alice Mary Galloway
- Sir John Henry Jaffray, 3rd Baronet (1893–1916), son of the 2nd Baronet
- Colonel Sir William Edmund Jaffray, 4th Baronet (1895–1953), younger son of the 2nd Baronet
- Sir William Otho Jaffray, 5th Baronet (1951–2026), son of the 4th Baronet
- Sir Nicholas Gordon Alexander Jaffray, 6th Baronet (born 1982)

The heir presumptive is the present holder's younger brother Jack Henry William Jaffray (born 1987).

== Notes ==
Baronetage of the United Kingdom
Preceded by MacTaggart-Stewart baronets	Jaffray baronets of Skilts; 8 October 1892	Succeeded by Hunt baronets
