= Birmingham Journal (nineteenth century) =

Weekly newspaper in England (1825–1869)

The Birmingham Journal was a weekly newspaper published in Birmingham, England, between 1825 and 1869.

A nationally influential voice in the Chartist movement in the 1830s, it was sold to John Frederick Feeney in 1844 and was a direct ancestor of today's Birmingham Post.

== History ==
The newspaper was founded as a Tory newspaper by a printer called William Hodgetts in 1825 to provide an alternative to The Times, whose editorial line was controversial locally.

Historical copies of the Birmingham Journal, dating back to its first issue in 1825, are available to search and view in digitised form at The British Newspaper Archive.

=== Chartist heyday ===
The newspaper's political tone changed dramatically in 1832, however, when it was sold to prominent Unitarian and Radical Joseph Parkes, who appointed R. K. Douglas as editor. Douglas was a national figure of the reform movement: the secretary of Thomas Attwood's reformed Birmingham Political Union and the author of the Chartist National Petition of 1838. With its close connections to the leaders of Birmingham's reform movement—which itself was at the forefront of national political life—the Journal gained a high profile and wide circulation. Its sales peaked at 2,500 per issue; and with the majority of newspaper readers during the era reading or listening to newspapers in communal reading rooms rather than buying their own copies, it was probably reaching about half of the population of Birmingham. The appeal of Chartism meant that its influence also stretched well beyond the local area: in 1839 it sold seventy-one weekly copies as far away as Dunfermline.

With the decline in local agitation for reform in the 1840s the newspaper's circulation dropped dramatically however. By 1844 it was only selling 1,200 copies per week when it was sold by Parkes to John Frederick Feeney.

=== Feeney ===
Feeney was first and foremost a newspaperman rather than a political agitator. He swiftly appointed the young John Jaffray to the editorship and maintained the popular appeal of a moderate Radical line. Chartism at the time was losing support in Birmingham through its adoption of a more extremist position in tune with the more pronounced class divisions of the cities of the North of England and Feeney and Jaffray's instinct was to follow local opinion rather than stay loyal to a movement.

The Journal's fortunes were also helped by economic changes. Rising levels of literacy and decreasing costs of production, coupled with Feeney and Jaffray's journalistic and commercial flair, saw circulation rise to 23,000 by the 1850s. The boom in railway building of the late 1840s greatly boosted the market for classified advertising and by 1855 the Journal was making a profit of £5,000 per week, comparable to that of a national newspaper.

=== The move to daily publication ===
The change that ultimately led to the end of the Journal was one which initially appeared as a prime opportunity. The 1855 Stamp Act removed the tax on newspapers and transformed the news trade. The price of the Journal was reduced from seven pence to four pence and circulation boomed.

The change ran deeper, however. While individual copies of newspapers were each taxed, the economics of newspaper production favoured large weekly publications. Untaxed, it became possible to sell a newspaper for a penny, and the advantage lay with smaller, more frequent publications that could keep their readers more up to date. Feeney and Jaffray initially contemplated a second weekly edition of the Journal, but the launch of Birmingham's first daily newspaper by prominent radical George Dawson—the short-lived Birmingham Daily Press—provoked them into launching their own daily title—the Birmingham Daily Post, later simply the Birmingham Post in 1857.

The Journal was initially maintained as a weekly publication complementing the daily Post, but the launch of the Post's Saturday edition—the Saturday Evening Post—rendered its situation untenable and the Journal ceased publication in 1869.
