= 1887 Taunton by-election =

UK parliament by-election

- 23 April 1887
Candidate	Alfred Percy Allsopp	James Harris Sanders
Party	Conservative	Liberal
Popular vote	1,426	890
Percentage	61.4%	38.3%
MP before election
Samuel Charles Allsopp
Conservative
Subsequent MP
Alfred Percy Allsopp
Conservative

The 1887 Taunton by-election was held on 23 April 1887 in Taunton, Somerset, following the succession of the incumbent, Samuel Charles Allsopp, to the peerage upon the death of his father, becoming 2nd Baron Hindlip. One of Lord Hindlip's brothers, Alfred Percy Allsopp, stood for the Conservative Party, while James Harris Sanders was the candidate for the Liberal Party. Allsopp was elected, with a majority of 536 votes (23.1%).

Although they had considered not contesting the election because the area was a Conservative stronghold, the Liberals decided to do so in order to generate a discussion on the issue of Home Rule for Ireland. Allsopp was in agreement with the Conservative policy, which was to maintain full governmental control over Ireland, and pass further Coercion Acts to reduce lawlessness in that country. Sanders, who had lost two previous elections for the Liberal Party, was in favour of devolution of powers to Ireland.

== Background ==
=== Vacancy and nominations ===
At the 1886 general election, Samuel Allsopp held his seat in parliament unopposed for the Conservative Party. In April 1887, his father, Henry Allsopp, 1st Baron Hindlip, died. As a result of this, Samuel Allsopp succeeded, entering the House of Lords as a peer. This left the parliamentary constituency of Taunton vacant. The Conservative Party offered Samuel Allsopp's brother, Alfred Percy Allsopp (commonly known as Percy Allsopp) the chance to contest the vacancy. Initially it was reported that the Liberal Party would not contest the seat if Percy Allsopp was the only Conservative candidate, but a meeting of the local executive could not reach a consensus: some believed that as the area was so strongly Conservative, a large loss would be damaging to the party, while others wanted to generate a debate on Home Rule. Despite the Taunton executive of the Conservative Party selecting Percy Allsopp as their preferred candidate, the town's Mayor, Samuel Farrant, declared that he would also stand for the Conservatives, which led to concern within that party that a split of the votes could result in a Liberal candidate being elected. Farrant later withdrew his candidacy, leaving Allsopp as the Conservative's sole representative. After their initial uncertainty, the Liberals opted to give the Taunton electorate the opportunity to show their views on Home Rule, and chose James Harris Sanders, of London, as their candidate.

=== Candidates ===
Alfred Percy Allsopp was the seventh, and youngest, son of Henry Allsopp, 1st Baron Hindlip, and at the time of the election, was resident in Lichfield, Staffordshire. He often accompanied his brother during his time in office in Taunton, and had occasionally represented him in the town. The Taunton Courier noted that at one dinner, he "made a great impression by the perspicacity of his utterances, by the breadth of view they indicated, and by his fluency of speech." He was a partner in Samuel Allsopp & Sons, which along with Guinness and Bass was one of the largest brewers in the world.

James Harris Sanders, commonly Harris Sanders, was born in Tavistock, Devon, the second son of Richard Sanders. Sanders had previously stood in the 1886 general election in Harborough, South Leicestershire, and in the King's Lynn by-election in the same year, losing both. The Western Times described him as "an unexceptionable candidate", while the Taunton Courier elaborated on his past election performances, and commented that he was "becoming accustomed to acting as a political ninepin".

=== Home Rule ===
Home Rule was the key issue in British politics in the late 1880s. The debate revolved around granting Ireland more powers to govern themselves. William Ewart Gladstone, the Liberal Prime Minister, proposed the First Home Rule Bill in April 1886, aiming to devolve power to Ireland. The Conservatives were opposed to the Bill, and were joined by a number of Liberal members in defeating the Bill. This caused a split in the Liberal party, the creation of the Liberal Unionist Party, and a fresh general election, just a year after the last. At the 1886 general election, the Conservatives entered government with Lord Salibsury as Prime Minister. They formed a majority with the Liberal Unionists.

== Election campaign ==
At the Conservative Assembly meeting at which Allsopp was formally nominated as the party's candidate, one of his nominators, Mr J. Standfast, decried the situation in Ireland. He called upon the people of Taunton to show that they "disapproved of the murders, and robberies, and outrages which were so common in Ireland, and were not prepared to hand over to the instigators of those crimes the government of that island." Allsopp did not initially campaign heavily, while he grieved for his father, but he did leave an advert in the Taunton Courier stating his support for the Conservative government's position on the administration of Ireland. He noted that his views mirrored those of his brother, the previous MP. During his campaigning, Allsopp drew parallels between the 1881 Coercion Bill, which Gladstone had introduced, with the proposed Crimes Bill, which Gladstone and Sanders both opposed. He accused them of hypocrisy, and claimed that those in support of Home Rule did not understand what it meant. He spoke of his hope for the Crimes Bill to be passed, and his belief that it would end the "misery and distress" in Ireland.

At Sanders' nomination, the Liberal candidate spoke of his "entire concurrence" with Gladstone's proposals. At a meeting shortly thereafter, Sanders seconded a resolution raised by a fellow Liberal member protesting "against the attempt to impose coercion upon Ireland for ever." Sanders then highlighted the Corrupt Practices Act, and appealed to the party members to not only avoid engaging in any corruption, but to remain honourable at all times. He spoke at length about the virtues of Liberalism, and what he described as the sad history of Ireland under English rule. The following Monday, which was Easter Monday, Sanders travelled to London to take part in demonstrations against the Perpetual Crimes Bill. As the election drew close, Sanders issued a statement that he had deposited £1,500 in a local bank, of which £500 would be split as rewards if people presented evidence of bribery and corruption in the election that led to a conviction. The other £1,000 was set aside for a possible petition against the election result.

The two sides both adopted mottoes during the election: the Conservatives called for people to "Vote for Allsopp and liberty", while the Liberals used "No Coercion, vote for Sanders." Cartoons were distributed by the Liberals, illustrating the recent evictions in Ireland. In reaction, the Conservatives posted pictures of "brutal outrages" that had been recently committed in that country.

== Result ==
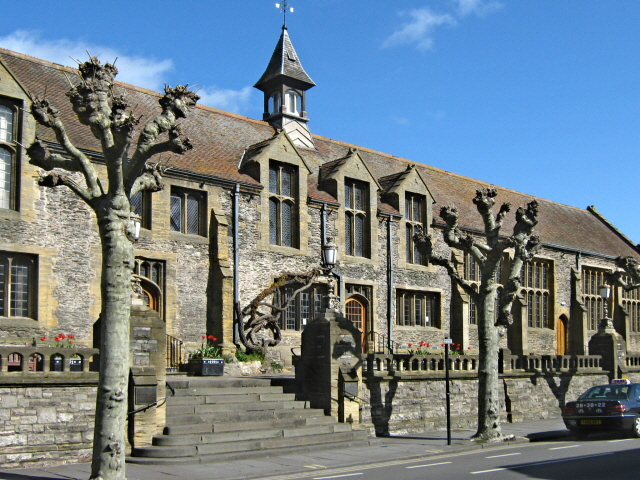
The votes were counted in the Municipal Offices

The vote was held on Saturday 23 April 1887, with the booths open for twelve hours from eight in the morning. There were seven polling stations across Taunton, which was busy as it was market day. The Taunton Courier reported that party colours of both sides were on display, but that there was more "Conservative blue" than the tri-colour and Union Jack of the Liberals. Campaigning continued throughout the day, but was conducted in a civil manner. Two hours into the voting it was announced that a third of the constituency had voted, and the Conservatives declared that they were leading by a ratio of two to one. Bad weather in the middle of the day caused a lull in the voting, but the polls were very busy throughout the afternoon when the weather cleared, as most of the town only worked half of the day. Based upon their polling on the day, the Conservatives continued to claim victory during the afternoon. The votes were counted in the Municipal Office, and the results were announced at quarter-past nine in the evening. Allsopp received 1,426 votes to Sanders' 890, granting him a 536 majority. Both Allsopp and Sanders spoke briefly to praise the Returning Officer, and Allsopp was then called upon to give a speech. During that speech, Allsopp thanked the people of Taunton, and gently mocked Sanders for the money he had banked in case of corruption.

By-Election: Taunton
Party	Candidate	Votes	%	±%
Conservative	Alfred Percy Allsopp	1,426	61.4	+3.4
Liberal	James Harris Sanders	890	38.3	–3.4
Majority		536	23.1	+6.8
Turnout		2,321	87.6	–3.6
Conservative hold		Swing	+3.4	

== Aftermath ==
Despite initial suggestions that a petition would be lodged against the result by Sanders, including a strong assertion in the Pall Mall Gazette, such a petition was eventually abandoned. Allsopp entered parliament, becoming the 18th new Member of Parliament to be elected since the general election in 1886. Allsopp served as the Member for Taunton until the 1895 general election.
