= John Robinson McClean =

British engineer and politician

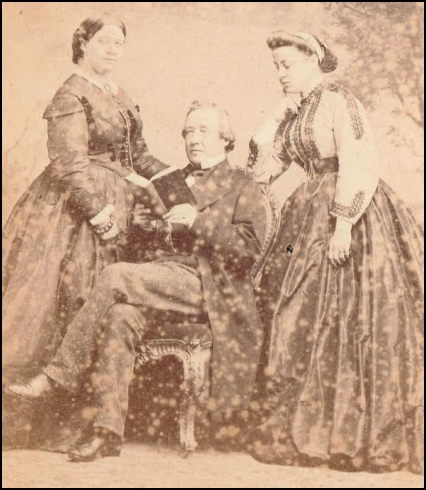
- McClean, wife Anna and their eldest daughter Mary Hall (Minnie)
- Born: 21 March 1813; Belfast, Northern Ireland
- Died: 13 July 1873 (aged 60)
- Education: University of Glasgow
- Engineering career
- Discipline: civil engineer
- Institutions: Institution of Civil Engineers (president)
- Practice name: South Staffordshire Water Works Company
- Projects: South Staffordshire Railway, Suez Canal

John Robinson McClean CB FRS FRSA FRAS (21 March 1813 – 13 July 1873), was an Irish civil engineer and Liberal Party politician. He carried out many important works, and for a time was the sole owner of a main line railway, the first individual to do so. He carried out philanthropic works including securing a fresh water supply to overcome persistent outbreaks of cholera, taking no salary for his work.

== Early life ==
He was born in the Bank Buildings, Belfast, and was the youngest of four sons of Francis McClean and Margaret McReyolds. Francis was an ironmonger, his shop being the centre one of three located on the ground floor of the Bank Buildings, One brother (Adam) was a Civil Engineer in Dublin, while another (Francis), became an eminent dentist, practicing at St Stephens Green, Dublin. John was educated at Belfast Academical Institution and University of Glasgow.

== Engineering career ==
Whilst still young, he offered himself as candidate for the Office of Engineer to the Belfast Harbour Commissioners, but was refused. Upon leaving the Board Room, he said to the then 'Secretary of the Belfast Harbour Board' Mr Edmund Getty, (an old family friend) "that he would let the Commissioners yet see what a man they had lost".

With his partner, Francis Croughton Stileman, he founded McClean & Stileman, engineering consultants of Great George St, Westminster. Some of his positions were:

- Advisor on the Suez Canal for the British Government.
- Extensive works for Emperor Napoleon in France.
- Chief Engineer of the Plymouth and Dover Harbours.
- Chairman of the Anglo-American Telegraph Company.
- Chief Engineer overseeing construction of the South Staffordshire Railway, which opened in 1849.

McClean was a member of the International Commission for the piercing of the Isthmus of Suez. In his 1864 presidential address to the Institution of Civil Engineers, he detailed his involvement and insights into the canal's construction. Alongside other British members of the Commission, McClean proposed a canal elevated twenty-five feet above sea level, utilising locks similar to those in the Caledonian Canal. This contrasted with the majority opinion on the commission, which favored a sea-level canal without locks. Despite their recommendations being overruled, McClean's contributions highlight the significant engineering debates and considerations in the canal's early history.

Boynton says "McClean was a talented civil engineer whose contribution to his profession deserves to be more widely recognised." When appointed as engineer to the South Staffordshire Railway, under construction at the time in October 1846, he was already working for four other railway companies. Earlier, when apprenticed to a firm of civil engineers in London, he had prepared surveys and detailed drawings for the Victoria Embankment and the new Westminster Bridge. When new sewers were needed for the capital and the commissioners invited plans, his were the best of 116 submitted and the only ones which gave an estimate of the costs.

McClean became aware of the dreadful state of Walsall's water supply; cholera and typhoid outbreaks took place there at regular intervals. McClean observed that Lichfield's water was clean and pure; he secured the agreement of some powerful friends, including the Earl of Dudley, and the South Staffordshire Waterworks Company was formed in 1853. The company supplied Walsall and Dudley with Lichfield water, using Stowe and Minster pools as reservoirs. The pipe run was installed alongside the railway. McClean was instrumental in the development of Sandfields Pumping Station in Lichfield which is now a community space and embryonic museum. Parts of Walsall were connected by 1858 but it took fifteen years to complete the scheme. McClean was engineer to the waterworks company, but drew no salary.

After an Act of Parliament was passed to allow it, he took a 25-year lease on the railway, thus becoming the first person to be the sole owner of a railway.

By 1853 he was also busying himself with mining, completing a railway line serving two of the Marquis of Anglesey's pits on Cannock Chase, known then as the Hammerwich and Uxbridge pits, known more recently as Cannock Chase Colliery Nos. 1 and 2.

Money invested by McClean, the Marquis and others helped to develop the Cannock Chase coalfield. The pits spawned the new communities of Chasetown and Chase Terrace, which were provided with schools, churches, a community centre and library by McClean. The opening of St. Anne's Free Church, Chasetown in 1865, was a high-profile occasion for a modest building in a mining village.

He was President of the Institution of Civil Engineers from 1864 to 1865.

== Political career ==
He unsuccessfully stood for Parliament as a Liberal Party candidate for Belfast at the 1857 general election, the second time he had been rejected by his native town.

He was elected at the 1868 general election as the Member of Parliament (MP) for East Staffordshire, and held the seat until his death in 1873.

He was also Lieutenant-Colonel of the Engineer and Railway Staff Corps, a volunteer corps whose members serve as engineering advisors to the British Army.

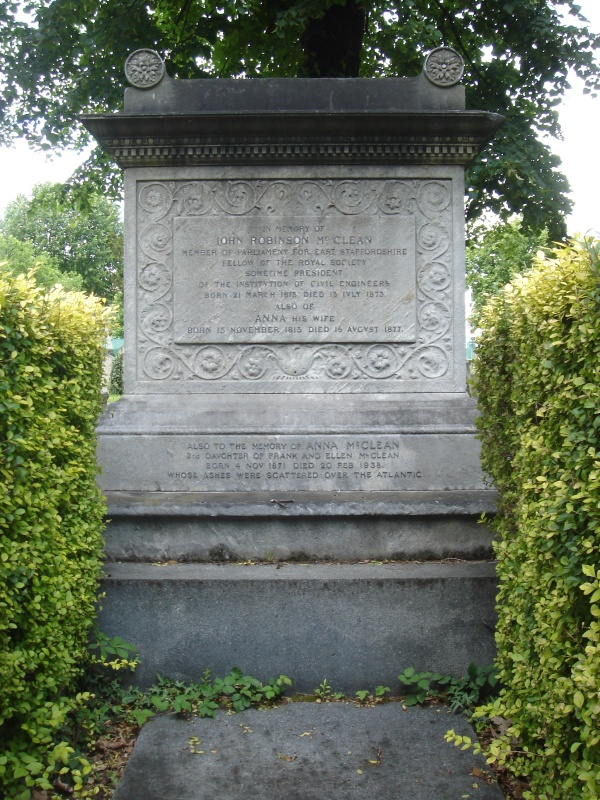
Funerary monument, Kensal Green Cemetery, London

== Later life ==
He died in 1873 aged 60, and is buried with his wife Anna, on the edge of the main path at Kensal Green Cemetery, London.

== Personal life ==
He was married 25 June 1834 in Glasgow to Anna Newsam (1813–1877). They had five daughters and one son, Frank McClean. Through Frank, their descendants include Francis McClean, Rupert Carington, 7th Baron Carrington, and the twelfth and subsequent Eliott baronets.

Parliament of the United Kingdom
New constituency	Member of Parliament for East Staffordshire; 1868–1873; With: Michael Bass	Succeeded by Samuel Allsopp and Michael Bass
Professional and academic associations
Preceded by John Hawkshaw	President of the Institution of Civil Engineers; December 1863 – December 1865	Succeeded by John Fowler
