= 1824 Clackmannanshire by-election =

UK parliamentary by-election

The 1824 Clackmannanshire by-election was held on 13 July 1824 when the incumbent MP Robert Bruce, who had been holding the seat as "locum" for the Abercrombie family, resigned. It was won by George Abercromby who was unopposed.
