= 1873 East Staffordshire by-election =

UK Parliamentary by-election

The 1873 East Staffordshire by-election was fought on 6 August 1873. The by-election was fought due to the death of the incumbent MP of the Liberal Party, John Robinson McClean. It was won by the Conservative candidate Samuel Allsopp, who defeated the Liberal candidate, John Jaffray, by 3.630 votes to 2,893.
