= Baron Hindlip =

Title in the Peerage of the United Kingdom

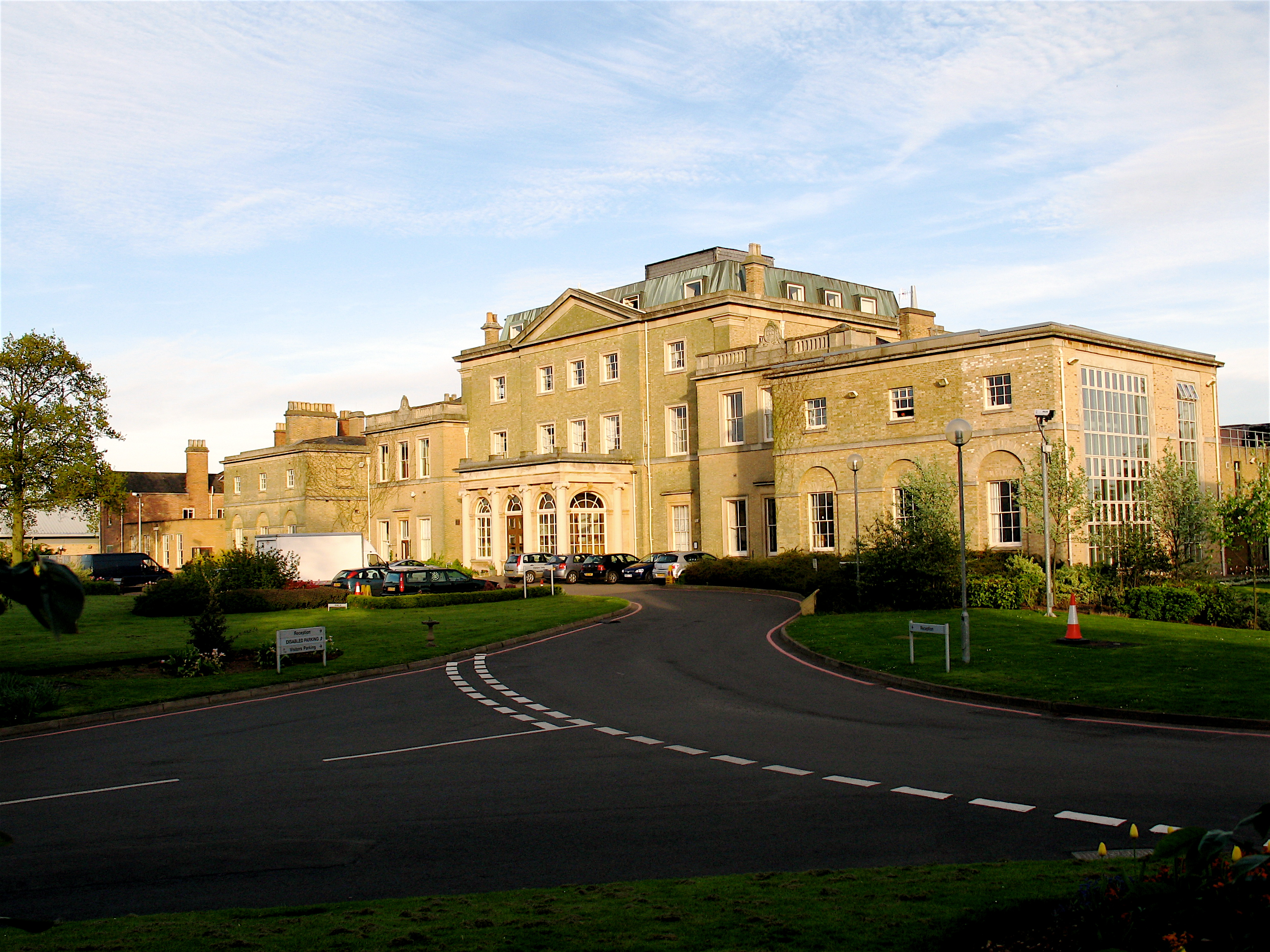
Hindlip Hall, the former seat of the Allsopp family

Baron Hindlip, of Hindlip in the County of Worcester and of Alsop-en-le-Dale in the County of Derby, is a title in the Peerage of the United Kingdom. It was created in 1886 for the businessman and Conservative politician Sir Henry Allsopp, 1st Baronet. He was head of the brewing firm of Samuel Allsopp & Sons of Burton upon Trent, and he also represented East Worcestershire in Parliament.

Allsopp had already been created a baronet, of Hindlip Hall in the Parish of Hindlip in the County of Worcester, in the Baronetage of the United Kingdom on 7 May 1880. His son, the second Baron, was also head of the family firm and sat as Conservative Member of Parliament for Staffordshire East and Taunton. His son, the third Baron, was a junior Unionist whip in the House of Lords from 1907 to 1914; and awarded Order of the British Empire in 1919. The third Baron's younger son, the fifth Baron (who succeeded his elder brother), was a Deputy Lieutenant of Wiltshire. As of 2024, the titles are held by the latter's grandson, the seventh Baron, who succeeded in 2024.

Television presenters Kirstie and Sofie Allsopp are daughters of the sixth Baron.

== Allsop baronets (1880) ==
- Sir Henry Allsopp, 1st Baronet (1811–1887) (created Baron Hindlip in 1886)

=== Baron Hindlip (1886) ===
- Henry Allsopp, 1st Baron Hindlip (1811–1887)
- Samuel Charles Allsopp, 2nd Baron Hindlip (1842–1897)
- Charles Allsopp, 3rd Baron Hindlip (1877–1931)
- Charles Samuel Victor Allsopp, 4th Baron Hindlip (1906–1966); elder son of the 3rd Baron
- Henry Richard Allsopp, 5th Baron Hindlip (1912–1993); younger son of the 3rd Baron
- Charles Henry Allsopp, 6th Baron Hindlip (1940–2024)
- Henry William Allsopp, 7th Baron Hindlip (born 1973)

The heir apparent is the 7th Baron's eldest son, Jasper James Allsopp (born 2017).

=== Title succession chart ===
Title succession chart, Barons Hindlip and Allsop baronets.

Henry Allsopp; 1st Baron Hindlip; 1st Baronet; 1811–1887
Samuel Allsopp; 2nd Baron Hindlip; 1842–1897
Henry Allsop; 1876–1876	Charles Allsopp; 3rd Baron Hindlip; 1877–1931
Charles Allsopp; 4th Baron Hindlip; 1906–1966	Henry Allsopp; 5th Baron Hindlip; 1912–1993
Charles Allsopp; 6th Baron Hindlip; 1940–2024
Henry Allsopp; 7th Baron Hindlip born 1973
Hon. Jasper Allsopp born 2017

=== Coat of arms ===
Coat of arms of Baron Hindlip
Coronet A coronet of a Baron Crest A Plover holding in the beak a Wheat-ear Or standing on a Pheon also Or Escutcheon Sable three Pheons in chevron Or between as many Doves rising Argent each holding in the beak a Wheat-ear Or Supporters On either side a Foxhound gorged with a Pair of Couples proper Motto Festina Lente (Latin for 'hasten slowly')

Baronetage of the United Kingdom
Preceded by Lennard baronets	Allsopp baronets of Hindlip Hall; 7 May 1880	Succeeded by Ripley baronets
