= East Staffordshire (constituency) =

Parliamentary constituency in the United Kingdom, 1868–1885

- Former county constituency for the House of Commons
- County: Staffordshire

1868–1885
- Seats: Two
- Created from: South Staffordshire; North Staffordshire
- Replaced by: Handsworth; Lichfield; Burton

East Staffordshire or Staffordshire East (formally the Eastern division of Staffordshire) was a county constituency in the county of Staffordshire. It returned two Members of Parliament (MPs) to the House of Commons of the Parliament of the United Kingdom, elected by the bloc vote system.

== History ==
The constituency was first created by the Second Reform Act for the 1868 general election, and abolished by the Redistribution of Seats Act 1885 for the 1885 general election.

== Boundaries ==
1868–1885: The Hundreds of Offlow (North) and Offlow (South) (excluding the Townships of Willenhall and Wednesfield), and the parish of Rushall.

== Members of Parliament ==
Election	1st Member	1st Party	2nd Member	2nd Party
1868	Michael Bass	Liberal	John Robinson McClean	Liberal Party
1873 by-election	Michael Bass	Liberal	Samuel Allsopp	Conservative
1880	Michael Bass	Liberal	Henry Wiggin	Liberal
1885	constituency abolished			

== Election results ==
=== Elections in the 1860s ===
General election 1868: East Staffordshire
Party	Candidate	Votes	%	±%
Liberal	Michael Bass	3,885	36.9	
Liberal	John Robinson McClean	3,675	34.9	
Conservative	John Hartley	2,972	28.2	
Majority		703	6.7	
Turnout		6,752 (est)	69.9 (est)	
Registered electors		9,658		
Liberal win (new seat)				
Liberal win (new seat)				

=== Elections in the 1870s ===
McClean's death caused a by-election.

By-election, 8 Aug 1873: East Staffordshire
Party	Candidate	Votes	%	±%
Conservative	Samuel Allsopp	3,630	57.4	+29.2
Liberal	John Jaffray	2,693	42.6	−29.2
Majority		937	14.8	N/A
Turnout		6,323	67.3	−2.6
Registered electors		9,402		
Conservative gain from Liberal		Swing	+29.2	

General election 1874: East Staffordshire
Party	Candidate	Votes	%	±%
Liberal	Michael Bass	Unopposed		
Conservative	Samuel Allsopp	Unopposed		
Registered electors		9,484		
Liberal hold				
Conservative gain from Liberal				

=== Elections in the 1880s ===
General election 1880: East Staffordshire
Party	Candidate	Votes	%	±%
Liberal	Michael Bass	4,809	29.5	N/A
Liberal	Henry Wiggin	4,617	28.4	N/A
Conservative	Samuel Allsopp	3,552	21.8	N/A
Conservative	John Hardy	3,306	20.3	N/A
Majority		1,065	6.6	N/A
Turnout		8,142 (est)	75.4 (est)	N/A
Registered electors		10,799		
Liberal hold		Swing	N/A	
Liberal gain from Conservative		Swing	N/A	
