= Alfred Percy Allsopp =

English businessman and Conservative Party politician (1861 – 1929)

- Allsopp in 1895
- Born: 26 August 1861
- Died: 22 February 1929 (aged 67)
- Occupation: Businessman

Alfred Percy Allsopp (26 August 1861 – 22 February 1929) was an English businessman and Conservative Party politician.

Allsopp was the sixth and youngest son of Henry Allsopp, 1st Baron Hindlip and Elizabeth Tongue. Several of his brothers were active in politics.

He was elected as the member of parliament (MP) for Taunton at a by-election in April 1887, in the place of his oldest brother, Samuel, who had succeeded to the peerage on the death of their father. He was re-elected in 1892, and stood down from Parliament at the 1895 general election.

Allsopp was appointed as a deputy lieutenant of Staffordshire in 1887. He was also a justice of the peace (JP) in Worcestershire. He was mayor of Worcester three times (1892, 1894 and 1909).

Alfred entered the family business Samuel Allsopp & Sons, as a junior partner from 1883 to 1887. He later became chairman of the company, and oversaw its conversion into a Limited Company, and retired from the business in 1900 and then sold all his shares in the company. He was also a director of the New Grand Hotel in Birmingham, of the Yolandi Mining Corporation Limited, and of Allsopp and Partners.

He was made bankrupt in June 1914, after losses at Allsopp and Partners forced him to resort to moneylenders, and discharged from bankruptcy in 1920.

Parliament of the United Kingdom
Preceded by Samuel Allsopp	Member of Parliament for Taunton; 1887 – 1895	Succeeded by Alfred Welby
