= Henry Allsopp, 1st Baron Hindlip =

British businessman and Conservative politician

Henry Allsopp, 1st Baron Hindlip DL (19 February 1811 – 2 April 1887), known as Sir Henry Allsopp, Bt, between 1880 and 1886, was a British businessman and Conservative politician.

== Background ==
Allsopp was the third son of Samuel Allsopp (12 August 1780 – 26 February 1838), the son of James Allsopp and Anne Wilson, head of the brewery firm of Samuel Allsopp & Sons of Burton-on-Trent and his wife Frances Fowler.

== Career ==
He represented East Worcestershire in the House of Commons between 1874 and 1880 when he was ennobled. In 1874 he was made a deputy lieutenant of Worcestershire. He was created a Baronet, of Hindlip Hall in the Parish of Hindlip in the County of Worcester, in 1880, and raised to the peerage as Baron Hindlip, of Hindlip in the County of Worcester and of Alsop-en-le-Dale in the County of Derby, in 1886.

Allsopp succeeded his father in 1838 in running of the family brewing business. He was very upset when shareholders claimed they had been misled over its 1887 stockmarket flotation, and he died within weeks of the criticism.

== Family ==
Lord Hindlip married in 1839 Elizabeth Tongue, daughter of William Tongue. They had several children, including:

- Samuel Charles Allsop (1842–1897), who succeeded as Baron Hindlip, from whom the current Baron is descended.
- Lieutenant-Colonel Hon. William Henry Allsop (1843–1909), Worcestershire Regiment; married 1888–1893 (annulled) Isabel Margaret Hutton.
- Hon. George Higginson Allsopp (1846–1907), Member of Parliament for Worcester 1885–1906; married 1895 Lady Mildred Georgiana Ashley-Cooper (1867–1968), daughter of Anthony Ashley-Cooper, 8th Earl of Shaftesbury, and left children.
- Lieutenant-Colonel Hon. Ranulph Allsop (1848–1911), Royal Artillery; married 1898 Margaret Whitbread, and left children.
- Hon. Frances Elisabeth Allsop (1850–1932); married 1877 Rev. Melville Russell Moore.
- Hon. Elizabeth Sydney Allsop (1852–1928); married 1874 Thomas Eades Walker (1843–1899), and left children.
- Captain Hon. Herbert Tongue Allsopp (1855–1920); married 1891 Edith Mary Okeover, and left children.
- Captain Hon. Frederic Ernest Allsop (1857–1928), Royal Artillery.
- Hon. Alfred Percy Allsopp (1861–1929), Member of Parliament for Taunton 1887–1885, three times Mayor of Worcester; married 1890 Lilian Maud Chesshire, and left children.
- Hon. Ada Katharine Allsop (d1903); married 1881 Edward Waldron Haywood.

Lord Hindlip died in April 1887, aged 76, and was succeeded in his titles by his eldest son Samuel. Lady Hindlip died in 1906.

== Coat of arms ==
Coat of arms of Henry Allsopp, 1st Baron Hindlip
Coronet A coronet of a Baron Crest A Plover holding in the beak a Wheat-ear Or standing on a Pheon also Gold Escutcheon Sable three Pheons in chevron Or between as many Doves rising Argent each holding in the beak a Wheat-ear Or Supporters On either side a Foxhound gorged with a Pair of Couples proper Motto Festina Lente (Hasten slowly)

== See also ==
- Beerage

== Notes ==
Parliament of the United Kingdom
Preceded by Charles Lyttelton; Richard Amphlett	Member of Parliament for East Worcestershire; 1874–1880; With: Thomas Eades Walker	Succeeded by William Henry Gladstone; George Hastings
Peerage of the United Kingdom
New creation	Baron Hindlip; 1886–1887	Succeeded by Samuel Allsopp
Baronetage of the United Kingdom
New creation	Baronet of Hindlip Hall; 1880–1887	Succeeded by Samuel Allsopp
