= John Frederick Feeney =

Irish journalist and newspaper proprietor

John Frederick Feeney (1807–1869) was a British journalist and newspaper proprietor.

Spending most of his adult life in Birmingham, England, he owned the Birmingham Journal and, with John Jaffray, founded the Birmingham Post. He emigrated from Sligo, Ireland in 1836 to England via Liverpool and changed the spelling of his surname from Feeny. He was one of ten children born to John Feeny and Jane Mulvogue, originally from Boyle, County Roscommon, Ireland.

== Family ==
His daughter Florence Feeney married Alexander Inglis of Auchendinny and Redhall. Their children (Feeney's grandchildren) included Charles Edward Inglis FRS and John Alexander Inglis FRSE.
