= Birmingham Post =

Newspaper based in Birmingham, England

- Type: Weekly printed newspaper with daily tablet edition
- Format: Compact
- Owner: Reach plc
- Founded: 1857
- Political alignment: conservative
- Headquarters: Birmingham, England
- Circulation: 844 (as of 2023)
- ISSN: 0963-7915
- Website: birminghampost.co.uk

The Birmingham Post is a weekly printed newspaper based in Birmingham, England, with distribution throughout the West Midlands. First published under the name the Birmingham Daily Post in 1857, it has had a succession of distinguished editors and has played an influential role in the life and politics of the city. It is currently owned by Reach plc. In June 2013, it launched a daily tablet edition called Birmingham Post Business Daily. In 2019, the website was scrapped to instead host the nationwide business news brand Business Live.

== History ==
The Birmingham Journal was a weekly newspaper published between 1825 and 1869. A nationally influential voice in the Chartist movement in the 1830s, it was sold to John Frederick Feeney in 1844 and was a direct ancestor of today's Birmingham Post.

The 1855 Stamp Act removed the tax on newspapers and transformed the news trade. The price of the Journal was reduced from seven pence to four pence and circulation boomed. Untaxed, it became possible to sell a newspaper for a penny, and the advantage lay with smaller, more frequent publications that could keep their readers more up to date. Feeney and Journal editor, John Jaffray initially contemplated a second mid-week edition of the Journal, but the launch of Birmingham's first daily newspaper by prominent radical George Dawson—the short-lived Birmingham Daily Press—provoked them into launching their own daily title, The Birmingham Daily Post, on 4 December 1857.

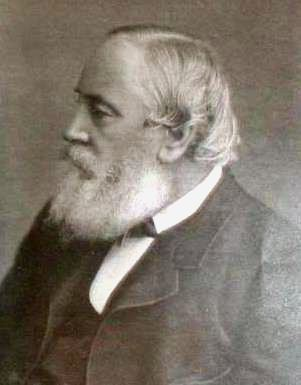
John Thackray Bunce, influential editor of the Birmingham Post from 1862 to 1898

Historical copies of the Birmingham Daily Post, dating back to 1857, are available to search and view in digitized form at the British Newspaper Archive.

=== Radical politics ===
From the outset the Post became closely associated with radical politics and intellectual movements. The newspaper played an important role in the calls for radical political and social reform in the rapidly expanding industrial town. In 1869 Birmingham Daily Post editor John Thackray Bunce was instrumental in getting Joseph Chamberlain elected to the Town Council for the first time. The newspaper remained a staunch supporter of Chamberlain helping to take the town with him as he pushed for municipal reform. It printed informed articles on the ideals of the Civic Gospel, and gave a platform to radical figures such as John Bright, George Dawson, Robert William Dale, and William Harris.

=== Leading regional paper ===
John Frederick Feeney died in 1869, and was succeeded by his son John. He inherited his father's passion the city and built on his success. By the 1870s, the Birmingham Daily Post was the largest circulating daily newspaper in the Midlands. Following the death of John Feeney in 1905, ownership of the Post passed to his nephew, Charles Hyde.

Hyde was instrumental in urging middle class recruits to volunteer for the Birmingham Pals battalions at the outbreak of the First World War. In an editorial of August 1914 he wrote: "At all costs Germany must be restrained. Birmingham can and ought to do much more...we should raise a battalion of non-manual workers." The word 'Daily' was dropped from the title in 1918. Hyde remained the proprietor of the Birmingham Post and Mail until his death in 1942. Following in the footsteps of his grandfather and uncle, Hyde was a great philanthropist and stated in his Will that the Birmingham Post and the Birmingham Mail, which he also owned, should be sold, with the proceeds going to various charities and hospitals.

=== Conservative paper ===
The papers were bought by an established newspaper proprietor Sir Edward Iliffe, a former Conservative MP, who already owned the Coventry Evening Telegraph. It became part of a public company, the Birmingham Post & Mail Limited.

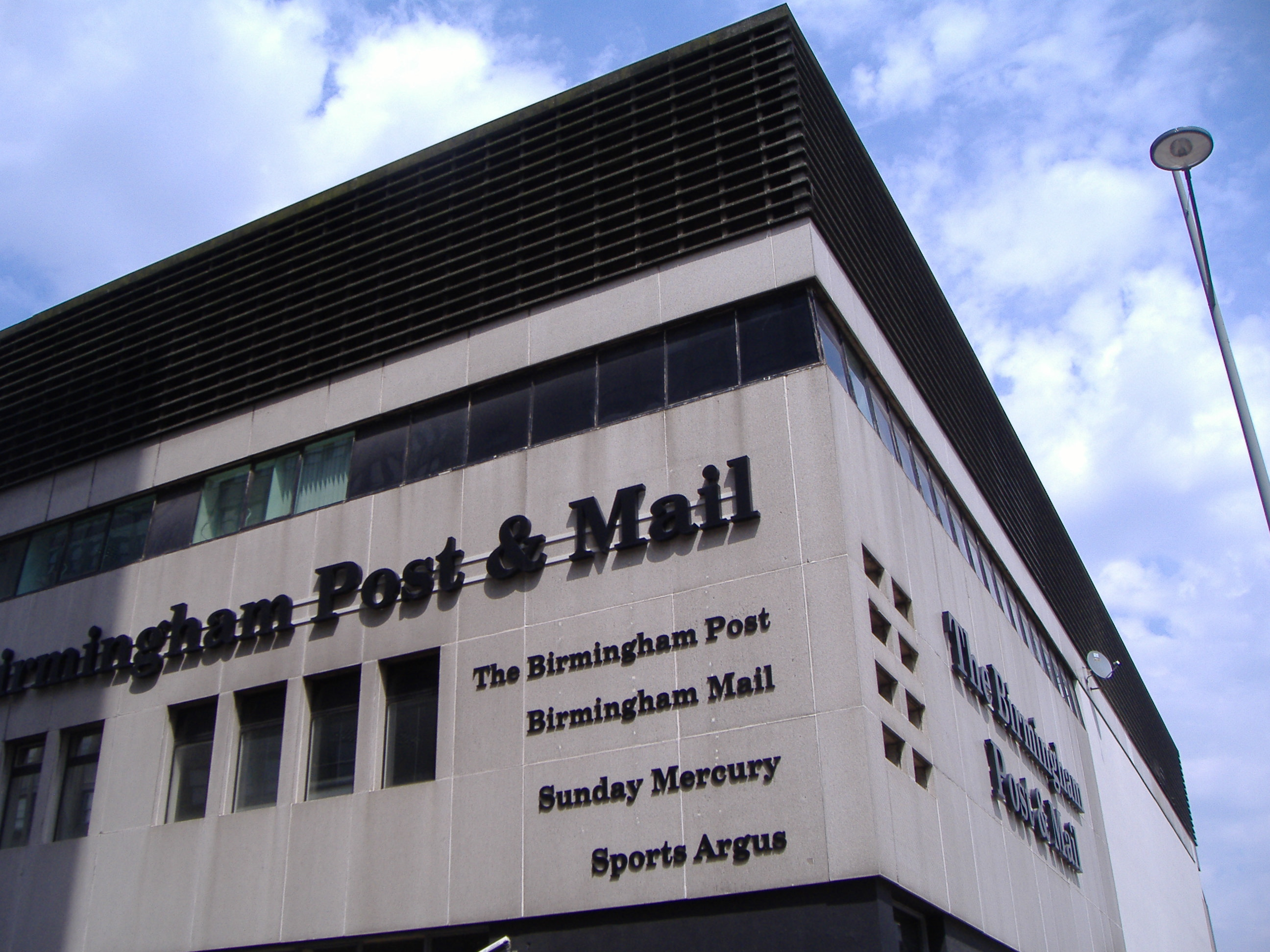
John Madin's Birmingham Post and Mail building stood from 1964 until 2005

The Birmingham Post, Evening Mail, Sports Argus and Sunday Mercury moved into the purpose built Post and Mail building in the city centre in 1965. Its concrete and steel structure with glass and aluminium cladding panels seemed impressively modern when it was built, but its brutalist 1960s design did not age well and it was demolished in 2005. The newspapers relocated to the restored Fort Dunlop building, three miles out of the city centre, in August 2008.

=== Birmingham's business paper ===
American Ralph Ingersoll II bought out the controlling interest of the Iliffe family in 1987. In 1991, the Post reverted to a broadsheet format. Later in 1991, the managing director, Chris Oakley, led a management buy-out. The company, Midland Independent Newspapers, was floated on the Stock Exchange three years later making Oakley and his team millionaires overnight. In 1997, Midland Independent Newspapers was sold for £297 million to Mirror Group. In 1999, Mirror Group merged with the regional newspaper group Trinity. The Birmingham Post is today one of 155 titles in the Trinity Mirror (now Reach plc) portfolio.

In 2008, the paper switched from broadsheet to tabloid format. In November 2009, under Marc Reeves' editorship, in response to falling circulation due to the increased competition from new media, the Post moved to weekly publication (Thursday) and revamped its website.

In June 2013, the Birmingham Post launched a tablet edition called Business Daily. Trinity Mirror described the move as the first of its kind. It currently publishes 30 pages every weekday and carries content, says former editor Stacey Barnfield, that is "completely different from the Birmingham Post's print edition."

In 2019, the website was scrapped to instead host the nationwide business news brand Business Live.

== Editors ==
- John Thackray Bunce (1862–1899)
- A. H. Poultney (1899–1905)
- George William Hubbard (1906–1933)
- Edgar W. Record (1933–1943)
- L. P. Hadley (1943–1945)
- T. W. Hutton (1945–1950)
- W. Vaughan Reynolds (1950– )

Before Reedy, the editor was David Hopkinson. He later moved to the Evening Mail and then to The Times. Obituaries can be found in The Times and The Daily Telegraph.

- Jack Reedy (1974–1982)
- Peter Saunders (1984–1989)
- Vince Kelly (1989–1991)
- Terry Page (1991–1993)
- Nigel Hastilow (1993–1999)
- Dan Mason (1999–2003)
- Fiona Alexander (2003–2005)
- Tony Lennox (2005–2006)
- Marc Reeves May (2006 – December 2009)
- Alun Thorne (December 2009 – November 2012)
- Stacey Barnfield (March 2013 – June 2015)
