= Herbert Allsopp =

English cricketer (1855–1920)

Personal information
- Full name: Herbert Allsopp
- Born: 5 December 1855; Foremarke Hall, England
- Died: 31 January 1920 (aged 64); Barnwood, England
- Batting: Right-handed
- Bowling: Fast

Domestic team information
- Years: Team
- 1876: Cambridge University

Career statistics
Competition	First-class
Matches	5
Runs scored	80
Batting average	11.42
100s/50s	0/0
Top score	22
Balls bowled	136
Wickets	6
Bowling average	9.66
5 wickets in innings	0
10 wickets in match	0
Best bowling	3/15
Catches/stumpings	4/–
- Source: CricketArchive, 9 August 2008

The Hon. Captain Herbert Tongue Allsopp (5 December 1855 – 31 January 1920) was an English first-class cricketer who played for Cambridge University.

Allsopp was the son of the brewer Henry Allsopp, 1st Baron Hindlip. He was educated at Cheltenham College, and Trinity Hall, Cambridge. He played five matches for Cambridge University in 1876, including the Varsity match which Cambridge won. His highest score of 22 came when playing for Cambridge University in the match against Gentlemen of England. His best bowling of 3/15 came when playing for Cambridge University in the match against Marylebone Cricket Club. He played for Marylebone Cricket Club (MCC) in 1877 and for Worcestershire County Cricket Club against MCC in 1880, but the matches were not given First Class status.

Allsopp joined the 10th Royal Hussars as a 2nd Lieutenant in 1877 and served with them in the Second Anglo-Afghan War, 1878–80. He was present at the attack and capture of Ali Musjed and took part in the engagement at Futtehabad. He was promoted to lieutenant in 1881 and took part in the Nile Expedition of 1884. He was present at the engagements at El Teb and Temai and was promoted to captain in 1887. He retired from the army in 1890 and was playing cricket for I Zingari.

Allsop died at Walton Bury, Staffordshire at the age of 64. His brother Frederic Allsopp and his brother-in-law George Buckston also played First Class cricket.
