= Beerage =

Beerage is the influence of the brewing industry within the British political system. A portmanteau word combining beer and peerage, it arose through the ennoblement and award of other honours to brewers in the late 19th century, and such individuals were considered to be within this subset of the peerage. Its use has since been applied in other contexts within the British beer sector.

== Historical use ==
'Beerage', a portmanteau word combining beer and peerage, was coined about 1880. The term carried connotations of political funding by brewers, and reciprocal favourable treatment of the brewing industry.

In the late 19th century, there were a large number of brewers as Members of Parliament in the House of Commons and several of these were elevated to the peerage or awarded other honours. The link between political donations and the honours system, though criticised, was then more prevalent.

The 19th-century Liberals included a strong contingent of temperance campaigners which created tensions with the brewing faction within the party. It has been noted that following Gladstone's Licensing Act 1872 "the beerage swung from the Liberal party to the Conservative party". By the early 1900s, the Conservative Benches in the House of Lords were known collectively as the "Beerage" and Winston Churchill had accused the Conservative Party of "drawing a brewer's dray across the road of progress". These references were used in 2005 to set the historical context in the course of debates in the House of Lords on a motion to withdraw the Licensing Act 2003.

In 1931 the term was used in the Commons during a "hotly debated" bill by Scottish Prohibition Party MP, Edwin Scrymgeour, to prohibit commercial liquor sales in Britain:

Mr. Scrymgeour: "Evidence given before the present Royal Licensing Commission showed that in four London brewing companies there were among the shareholders forty-six peers, twenty peeresses, 161 lords and ladies and honorables, forty-seven baronets, 106 knights and seventeen members of Parliament."
Lady Astor: "You might as well call it the beerage as the peerage", to which the Speaker interjected severely:
"I would remind the noble lady that it is a rule of this House not to say anything disrespectful of the Other Place (the House of Lords").

== Modern use ==
The term "beerage" has been used more recently in a wider context to reflect the dominance of the industry by major players. In 1995 the brewing industry was in the hands of the "Big Six" which by 2000 was down to two - Bass and Whitbread - that were about to withdraw from the industry. However, the lobbying power of the beerage was still great, and its long tradition of Tory Party activism still evident.

The hereditary principle of peerage has also seen the term applied to family-run breweries that have been inherited over the generations.

== Members of the beerage ==
Ennobled brewers include:

- Arthur Edward Guinness, Baron Ardilaun (1880)
- Henry Allsopp, 1st Baron Hindlip (1886)
- Michael Arthur Bass, 1st Baron Burton (1886)
- Earl of Iveagh (1919)
- Viscount Younger of Leckie (1923)
- Baron Daresbury (1927)
