= Frederic Allsopp =

English cricketer

Frederick Allsopp
Personal information
- Full name: Frederick Ernset Allsopp
- Born: 21 September 1857; Hindlip Hall, England
- Died: 20 December 1928 (aged 71); Hadzor House, England
- Batting: Right-handed
- Bowling: Slow

Domestic team information
- Years: Team
- 1884: Marylebone Cricket Club

Career statistics
Competition	First-class
Matches	2
Runs scored	46
Batting average	15.33
100s/50s	0/0
Top score	34
Balls bowled	56
Wickets	2
Bowling average	11.50
5 wickets in innings	0
10 wickets in match	0
Best bowling	1/8
Catches/stumpings	1/–
- Source: CricketArchive, 9 August 2008

The Hon. Frederic Allsopp (21 September 1857 – 20 December 1928) was an English first-class cricketer who played for Marylebone Cricket Club in 1884.

Allsopp was born at Hindlip Hall, Worcestershire, the son of the brewer Henry Allsopp, 1st Baron Hindlip. He was educated at Cheltenham College. In 1884 he played two first-class cricket matches for Marylebone Cricket Club His highest score of 34 came when playing for Marylebone Cricket Club in the match against Derbyshire County Cricket Club. His best bowling of 1/8 came in the same match. He was a member of I Zingari and in 1911 he also played two games for Worcestershire second XI which were both against Warwickshire second XI.

Allsopp died at Hadzor House, Droitwich, Worcestershire at 71. His brother Herbert Allsopp also played first-class cricket.
