= Liam Neeson filmography =

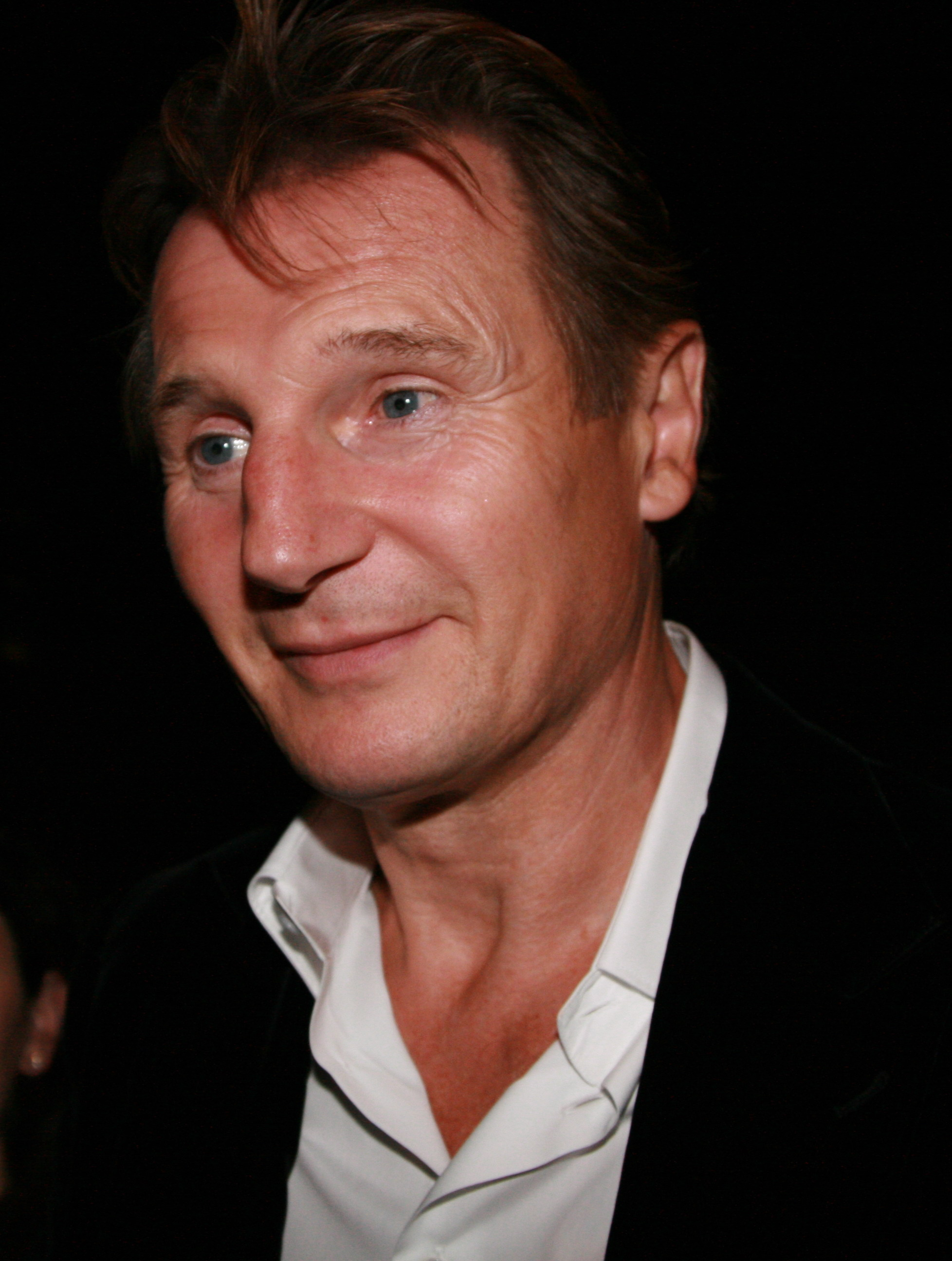
Liam Neeson at TIFF in 2008

Liam Neeson is an Irish actor. Neeson has had an extensive career in film, television and stage. He made his professional acting debut playing Jesus Christ in the film Pilgrim's Progress (1978). That same year he acted in the BBC anthology series Play for Today (1978). A few years later he made his stage debut in the Brian Friel play Translations (1980). He earned notoriety for his early roles as Gawain in the John Boorman medieval fantasy film Excalibur (1981), Charles Churchill in the Roger Donaldson historical drama The Bounty (1984), Father John Fielding in the Roland Joffé religious epic The Mission (1986), a conflicted and caring Christian Brother in the bleak tragic film Lamb (1986), and a charming writer in the Woody Allen romantic comedy-drama Husbands and Wives (1992).

Neeson gained prominence with his first successful lead role in Darkman, and acclaim for his leading role of Oskar Schindler in the Steven Spielberg's holocaust epic drama film Schindler's List (1993). He established himself as a leading man in a string of prestige films playing the title role of the romance drama Ethan Frome (1993), a town doctor in the drama film Nell (1994), the starring role in the historical drama Michael Collins (1996), and Jean Valjean in the costume drama Les Misérables (1998). He expanded his career gaining worldwide attention for his roles in franchise films such as Qui-Gon Jinn in the George Lucas space opera film Star Wars: Episode I – The Phantom Menace (1999), Henri Ducard / Ra's al Ghul in the Christopher Nolan superhero film Batman Begins (2005), Aslan the Lion in The Chronicles of Narnia series (2005–2010), and Zeus in Clash of the Titans (2010). He also acted in the Martin Scorsese historical epic Gangs of New York (2002), the British romantic comedy Love Actually (2003) and the historical drama Kinsey (2004).

He then established himself as an action star taking the leading role as a father out for vengeance in the action drama Taken (2008) followed by Taken 2 (2012) and Taken 3 (2014). He then starred in several action films such as The Grey (2012), Non-Stop (2013), A Walk Among the Tombstones (2014), Run All Night (2015), The Commuter (2018), Cold Pursuit (2019), Honest Thief (2020), Blacklight (2022), and In the Land of Saints and Sinners (2023). During this time he took roles in the fantasy drama A Monster Calls (2016), the historical epic Silence (2016), the western anthology The Ballad of Buster Scruggs (2018), and noir-thriller Widows (2018). He took comedic roles playing John "Hannibal" Smith in the action comedy The A-Team (2010), an outlaw in the western comedy in A Million Ways to Die in the West (2014) and a bumbling officer in the crime comedy The Naked Gun (2025).

On stage, he acted in Broadway revivals of the Eugene O'Neill play Anna Christie (1992), the David Hare play The Judas Kiss (1998), and the Arthur Miller play The Crucible (2001). Neeson has been nominated for a number of awards, including an Academy Award for Best Actor, a BAFTA Award for Best Actor in a Leading Role and three Golden Globe Awards for Best Actor in a Motion Picture Drama. Empire magazine ranked Neeson among both the "100 Sexiest Stars in Film History" and "The Top 100 Movie Stars of All Time."

== Film ==
Key
†	Denotes films that have not yet been released

Liam Neeson film performances
Year	Title	Role	Notes	Ref.
1978	Pilgrim's Progress	Evangelist / Jesus Christ		
1979	Christiana	Greatheart		
1981	Excalibur	Gawain		
1983	Krull	Kegan		
1984	The Bounty	Charles Churchill		
1985	Lamb	Michael Lamb		
1985	The Innocent	John Carns		
1986	The Mission	Father John Fielding		
1986	Duet for One	Totter		
1987	Suspect	Carl Anderson		
1987	A Prayer for the Dying	Liam Docherty		
1988	Satisfaction	Martin Falcon		
1988	High Spirits	Martin Brogan		
1988	The Dead Pool	Peter Swan		
1988	The Good Mother	Leo Cutter		
1989	Next of Kin	Briar Gates		
1990	Darkman	Peyton Westlake / Darkman		
1990	The Big Man	Danny Scoulars		
1991	Under Suspicion	Tony Aaron		
1992	Shining Through	Franz-Otto Dietrich		
1992	Husbands and Wives	Michael Gates		
1992	Leap of Faith	Sheriff Will Braverman		
1993	Ethan Frome	Ethan Frome		
1993	Ruby Cairo	Dr. Fergus Lamb		
1993	Schindler's List	Oskar Schindler		
1994	Nell	Dr. Jerome 'Jerry' Lovell		
1995	Rob Roy	Rob Roy MacGregor		
1996	Before and After	Ben Ryan		
1996	Michael Collins	Michael Collins		
1998	Les Misérables	Jean Valjean		
1999	Star Wars: Episode I – The Phantom Menace	Qui-Gon Jinn		
1999	The Haunting	Dr. David Marrow		
2000	Gun Shy	DEA Agent Charlie Mayough		
2002	K-19: The Widowmaker	Captain Mikhail Polenin		
2002	Gangs of New York	'Priest' Vallon		
2002	Star Wars: Episode II – Attack of the Clones	Qui-Gon Jinn (voice)	Cameo appearance	
2003	Love Actually	Daniel		
2004	Kinsey	Alfred Kinsey		
2005	Kingdom of Heaven	Godfrey of Ibelin		
2005	Batman Begins	Henri Ducard / Ra's al Ghul		
2005	Breakfast on Pluto	Father Liam		
2005	The Chronicles of Narnia: The Lion, the Witch and the Wardrobe	Aslan (voice)		
2006	Seraphim Falls	Colonel Morsman Carver		
2008	The Chronicles of Narnia: Prince Caspian	Aslan (voice)		
2008	The Other Man	Peter		
2008	Taken	Bryan Mills		
2009	Five Minutes of Heaven	Alistair Little		
2009	Ponyo	Fujimoto (voice)	English dub	
2009	After.Life	Eliot Deacon		
2009	Chloe	David Stewart		
2010	Clash of the Titans	Zeus		
2010	The A-Team	John "Hannibal" Smith		
2010	The Chronicles of Narnia: The Voyage of the Dawn Treader	Aslan (voice)		
2010	The Next Three Days	Damon Pennington		
2011	Unknown	Dr. Martin Harris		
2012	The Grey	John Ottway		
2012	Wrath of the Titans	Zeus		
2012	Battleship	Admiral Terrance Shane		
2012	The Dark Knight Rises	Ra's al Ghul	Cameo appearance	
2012	Taken 2	Bryan Mills		
2013	Third Person	Michael Leary		
2013	Khumba	Phango (voice)		
2013	Anchorman 2: The Legend Continues	History Channel Reporter	Cameo appearance	
2014	The Nut Job	Raccoon (voice)		
2014	The Lego Movie	Bad Cop / Good Cop / Pa Cop (voices)		
2014	The Prophet	Mustafa (voice)		
2014	Non-Stop	Bill Marks		
2014	A Million Ways to Die in the West	Clinch Leatherwood		
2014	A Walk Among the Tombstones	Matthew Scudder		
2014	Taken 3	Bryan Mills		
2015	Run All Night	Jimmy 'The Gravedigger' Conlon		
2015	Entourage	Himself	Cameo appearance	
2015	Ted 2	Customer	Cameo appearance	
2015	A Christmas Star	Narrator / Radio DJ		
2016	Operation Chromite	Douglas MacArthur		
2016	A Monster Calls	Monster / Conor's Grandfather (voices)	Also motion capture	
2016	Silence	Cristóvão Ferreira		
2017	The Nut Job 2: Nutty by Nature	Raccoon (voice)	Scenes deleted	
2017	Mark Felt: The Man Who Brought Down the White House	Mark Felt		
2017	Daddy's Home 2	Actor In Missile Tow (voice)	Cameo appearance	
2018	The Commuter	Michael McCauley		
2018	The Ballad of Buster Scruggs	Impresario	Segment: "Meal Ticket"	
2018	Widows	Harry Rawlings		
2019	Cold Pursuit	Nelson 'Nels' Coxman		
2019	Men in Black: International	High T		
2019	Ordinary Love	Tom Thompson		
2019	Star Wars: Episode IX – The Rise of Skywalker	Qui-Gon Jinn (voice)	Cameo appearance	
2020	Made in Italy	Robert Foster		
2020	Honest Thief	Tom Carter / Tom Dolan		
2021	The Marksman	Jim Hanson		
2021	The Ice Road	Mike McCann		
2022	Blacklight	Travis Block		
2022	Memory	Alex Lewis		
2022	Marlowe	Philip Marlowe		
2023	Retribution	Matt Turner		
2023	In the Land of Saints and Sinners	Finbar Murphy		
2023	Wildcat	Father Flynn		
2024	Absolution	Thug		
2025	Ice Road: Vengeance	Mike McCann		
2025	The Naked Gun	Frank Drebin Jr.		
2026	Cold Storage	Robert Quinn		
2026	The Fix	Larry		
2026	The Mongoose	Ryan "Fang" Flanagan		
2027	4 Kids Walk Into a Bank †	Danny	Post-production	

== Television ==
Liam Neeson television performances
Year	Title	Role	Notes
1978	Play for Today	Dermont	Episode: "Dinner at the Sporting Club"
1978	Ulster in Focus	Himself	Episode: "Trains"
1980	BBC2 Playhouse	Blacksmith	Episode: "My Dear Palestrina"
1986	Miami Vice	Sean Carroon	Episode: "When Irish Eyes Are Crying"
1988	Screen Two	Martin Perry	Episode: "Sweet as You Are"
2002	Liberty's Kids	John Paul Jones (voice)	Episode: "Not Yet Begun to Fight"
2004–14	Saturday Night Live	Himself	3 episodes
2005	The Simpsons	Father Sean (voice)	Episode: "The Father, the Son, and the Holy Guest Star"
2010	The Big C	Bee Man	Episode: "Everything That Rises Must Converge"
2011	Life's Too Short	Himself	Episode # 1.1
2011–14	Star Wars: The Clone Wars	Qui-Gon Jinn (voice)	3 episodes
2014	Rev.	God	Episode # 3.5
2014–15	Family Guy	Himself (voice)	2 episodes; "Brian's a Bad Father", "Fighting Irish"
2016	Inside Amy Schumer	Himself	Episode: "Welcome to the Gun Show"
2016	Dream Corp, LLC	Devil Demon	Voice; Episode: "The Leak"
2017	The Orville	Jahavus Dorahl	Episode: "If the Stars Should Appear"
2022	Derry Girls	Chief Constable Byers	2 episodes
2022	Atlanta	Himself	Episode: "New Jazz"
2022	Tales of the Jedi	Qui-Gon Jinn (voice)	Episode: "The Sith Lord"
2023	The Late Show with Stephen Colbert	Narrator (voice)	Episode: "The Indict-Mare Before Christmas"

=== TV films and miniseries ===
Liam Neeson television performances
Year	Title	Role	Notes
1984	Ellis Island	Kevin Murray	
1985	A Woman of Substance	Blackie O'Neill	
1985	Merlin and the Sword	Grak	
1986	If Tomorrow Comes	Insp. Andre Trignent	2 episodes
1987	Hold the Dream	Blackie O'Neill	Episode #1.1
1987	Sword to Silence	Vincent Cauley	
2001	Revenge of the Whale	Narrator	Documentary
2017	Red Nose Day Actually	Daniel	Television short film
2022	Obi-Wan Kenobi	Qui-Gon Jinn	Episode: "Part VI"

== Documentary appearances ==
Liam Neeson film performances
Year	Title	Role	Notes	Ref.
1996	The Great War and the Shaping of the 20th Century	John Lucy / Adolf Hitler (voices)		
1998	Everest	Narrator (voice)		
2000	The Endurance	Narrator (voice)		
2000	Empires: The Greeks	Narrator (voice)		
2001	Evolution	Narrator (voice)		
2002	Martin Luther	Narrator (voice)		
2003	Coral Reef Adventure	Narrator (voice)		
2004	Patrick	Narrator (voice)		
2006	Home	Himself		
2010	The Wildest Dream	Narrator (voice)		
2014	Love Thy Nature	Narrator (voice)		
2014	Road	Narrator (voice)		
2014	Wild Japan: Snow Monkeys	Narrator (voice)		
2016	1916: The Irish Rebellion	Narrator (voice)		
2018	The Last Horsemen of New York	Himself		
2018	Pope: The Most Powerful Man In History	Narrator (voice)	6 episodes	
2020	The Hunger	Narrator (voice)		

== Stage appearances ==
Liam Neeson stage performances
Year	Title	Role	Venue	Notes	Ref.
1976	The Risen People	Big Jim Larkin	Lyric Theatre, Belfast		
1976	The Loves of Cass Maguire	Dom	Lyric Theatre, Belfast		
1976	Philadelphia, Here I Come!	Gareth	Lyric Theatre, Belfast		
1976	Henry IV, Part 1	Percy	Lyric Theatre, Belfast		
1976	We Do it for Love	P.H. Pearse, O'Brien, IRA member	Abbey Theatre, Dublin		
1977	Black Man's Country	Father O'Brien	Lyric Theatre, Belfast		
1977	The Street		Lyric Theatre, Belfast		
1977	Mother Courage and Her Children		Lyric Theatre, Belfast		
1977	The Colleen Bawn		Lyric Theatre, Belfast		
1977	The Plough and the Stars	Jack Clitheroe	Lyric Theatre, Belfast		
1977	The Rise and Fall of Barney Kerrigan	Barney Kerrigan	Lyric Theatre, Belfast		
1977	A Little Night Music	Bertrand	Lyric Theatre, Belfast		
1978	Says I Says He		Project Arts Centre, Dublin		
1978	Streamers		Dublin Theatre Festival, Dublin		
1979	One Flew Over the Cuckoo's Nest		Gaiety Theatre, Dublin		
1979	Aristocrats	Eamon	Abbey Theatre, Dublin		
1979	The Death of Humpty Dumpty	Gerald Doyle	Abbey Theatre, Dublin		
1979	Juno and the Paycock	Irregular	Abbey Theatre, Dublin		
1979	I Do Not Like Thee, Doctor Fell	Roger	Abbey Theatre, Dublin		
1979	I Do Not Like Thee, Doctor Fell	Roger	Everyman Playhouse, Cork		
1979	The Sea	Hollarcut	Abbey Theatre, Dublin		
1979	City Sugar	Rex	Abbey Theatre, Dublin		
1980	Translations	Doalty	Field Day Theatre Company, Derry		
1980	Of Mice and Men	Lennie	Abbey Theatre, Dublin		
1980	The Winter's Tale	Franion	Abbey Theatre, Dublin		
1981	The Informer	Gypo Nolan	Dublin Theatre Festival, Dublin		
1992–93	Anna Christie	Mat Burke	Criterion Center Stage Right, New York	Broadway debut	
1998	The Judas Kiss	Oscar Wilde	Broadhurst Theatre, New York		
2001–02	The Crucible	John Proctor	The Virginia Theatre, New York		
2003	The Play What I Wrote	Mystery Guest Star	Lyceum Theatre, New York	Previews	
2008	Eh Joe	Joe	Lincoln Center, New York		

== Video games ==
Year	Title	Role	Notes	Ref.
2005	Batman Begins	Henri Ducard / Ra's al Ghul (voice)		
2008	Fallout 3	James (voice)	Also motion capture	
2014	The Lego Movie Videogame	Good Cop / Bad Cop (voice)		
2015	Lego Dimensions	Good Cop / Bad Cop (voice)	Archive audio	

== Audiobook narration ==
Year	Book	Role	Notes	Ref.
2017	The Polar Express	Narrator	Audio CD only	

== Discography ==
Year	Album	Role	Notes
2012	Jeff Wayne's Musical Version of The War of the Worlds – The New Generation	The Journalist	Spoken words only
