= Hugh Stoddart =

- Born: Hugh Martin Stoddart; 1947 (age 78–79); Kent, England
- Education: Worthing High School for Boys; Keble College, Oxford
- Occupations: Screenwriter; Art critic; Curator
- Years active: 1972–present
- Notable work: Remembrance (1982); To the Lighthouse (1983); We Think the World of You (1988); The Big Battalions (1992)
- Website: hughstoddart.co.uk

Hugh Stoddart is a British screenwriter and art critic. He has worked as a writer on many films, including the screen adaptation of a Virginia Woolf novel, To the Lighthouse (1983), which was directed by Colin Gregg. The film was Kenneth Branagh's first acting role.

Stoddart wrote the screenplay for the 1988 film We Think the World of You, also directed by Colin Gregg, and co-wrote the 2017 mystery drama film Waiting for You with its director Charles Garrad.

== Early years ==
Stoddart attended secondary school in Worthing, West Sussex and went on to Keble College, Oxford University, graduating with a degree in law in 1969. He spent some time as an articled clerk in a firm of solicitors in London then left to work in the arts. Stoddart was front of house manager at Greenwich Theatre and also manager of the art gallery housed in the theatre.

== Curator career ==
Stoddart moved from London to Devon in 1972 to take up a new appointment at South West Arts. At the time it was one of twelve regional arts organisations funded jointly by local government and the Arts Council of Great Britain. He was their first Visual Arts Officer and travelled widely across the region in support of artists and galleries; he also began to develop support for craft and film with funds from the Craft Council and the British Film Institute.

In 1978 Stoddart was appointed Director of the Ikon Gallery in Birmingham. It moved the same year to much larger premises. This was achieved at minimal cost and allowed an expansion of the programme both in the number of exhibitions and the scale of work that could be shown. Stoddart gave first exhibitions in the UK to Bernard Bazile, Chris Burden, Agnes Denes, Jochen Gerz, Noel Harding, Pieter Laurens Mol and Dennis Oppenheim. Oppenheim's sculpture Vibrating Forest was later restored and shown by the Henry Moore Foundation in Leeds. Denes’ work was subsequently toured to the Institute of Contemporary Arts London.

Stoddart's programme included UK artists at the start of their careers such as Paul Graham, Mali Morris and Hugh O’Donnell. He also included in the programme artists working in the area broadly referred to as installations art such as Ron Haselden, as well as those engaged in performance art. There was an exhibition at the Ikon Gallery to revisit the shows put on by Stoddart and his successor, Antonia Payne As Exciting As We Can Make It.

Stoddart left the Ikon Gallery at the end of his three year contract, and moved to London where he worked as a freelance art critic in the early 1990s. His reviews were published mainly in Contemporary Visual Arts, a magazine then edited by Keith Patrick.

== Writing career ==
Stoddart was active in amateur drama while at school and continued this interest at university where he was active both as an actor and director. Having written short stories previously he began to write drama while at university and sent his first scripts to the Royal Court Theatre, who invited him to join their Writers Group. He was drawn more to the screen than the theatre, however, and began writing scripts speculatively and seeking interest and reactions in his spare time.

A breakthrough came when Dartington Arts Trust agreed to fund his first original screenplay for a film to be shot in Cornwall. Co-written with the director Colin Gregg, Begging the Ring concerned a young man who faces conscription into the army during the First World War. Its title comes from a term used in Cornish wrestling. The film was selected for inclusion in the 22nd London Film Festival, November 1978. It won the Grierson Award (then still open to drama as well as documentary). It was then bought by the BBC but only screened in 1983; it led however to interest in other projects: Melvyn Bragg wanted to commission a film to acknowledge the 50th anniversary of D.H.Lawrence's death and for this Stoddart adapted his early novel The Trespasser, with Alan Bates starring opposite Pauline Moran. It was a feature-length film and screened in a specially extended edition of the South Bank Show in January 1981.

Stoddart's focus on single films, rather than on series drama, continued. His second original screenplay, Remembrance, was submitted to Channel Four. The film was shot on location in Plymouth during the autumn of 1981, shown in film festivals internationally during 1982 before its transmission in November 1982 during the first month of Channel Four's schedule. It starred Gary Oldman in his first film role.

Continuing the connection with the West Country, Stoddart's adaptation of To the Lighthouse was a project he had worked on for some time. He chose to locate the film in Cornwall rather than the Hebrides where the novel is set, as it was clearly inspired by Virginia Woolf's holidays there. The project was taken up by the BBC, directed by Colin Gregg in 1982 and transmitted in March 1983. Stoddart's next film Hard Travelling (BBC 1986) was from an original screenplay drawing on his ten years of involvement with contemporary art. This was followed by an adaptation of We Think The World Of You for Channel Four. Gary Oldman, whose first film was Remembrance was cast by Simone Reynolds again, this time opposite Alan Bates.

The Big Battalions, a five part original series, was commissioned by Brian Eastman then running Carnival Films. Starring Brian Cox and Jane Lapotaire, it was shown on Channel Four in 1992. Another adaptation followed, also commissioned by Brian Eastman, of George Eliot’s The Mill on the Floss starring Emily Watson. It was transmitted on New Year's Day 1997.

Stoddart was commissioned to write a two-part episode in the long-running series Dalziel and Pascoe. This was Dialogues of the Dead, transmitted December 2002. His final film, Waiting For You, was co-written with director Charles Garrad and starred Fanny Ardant and Colin Morgan. It was screened in 20 film festivals internationally.

== Prison Writing Project ==
From 2007 to 2012, Stoddart served as managing editor of ''NOT SHUT UP'', a magazine for prisoners distributed free to London prisons. The magazine featured interviews with former prisoners who had achieved success in writing or the arts, and ceased publication in 2015.

== Filmography ==
Year	Title	Genre	Credit
2017	Waiting for You	Feature	Co-writer
2014	Moth Dust	Video	Director, Writer, Producer
2013	My Passage Through a Brief Unity in Time	Short	Writer
2010	Lifetime	Video	Director, Story, Producer
2007	Eucalyptus	Short	Writer
2002	Dalziel and Pascoe (Series 7, Episode 5 - Dialogues of the Dead: Part 1, Episode 6 - Dialogues of the Dead: Part 2	TV Series	Screenplay
1997	The Mill on the Floss	TV Movie	Screenplay
1992	The Big Battalions (5 episodes)	TV Mini Series	Writer
1988	We Think the World of You	Feature	Screenplay
1986	Hard Travelling Screen Two (Series 2, Episode 12)	TV Series	Writer
1983	To the Lighthouse	TV Movie	Writer
1982	Remembrance	Feature	Screenplay
1981	The Trespasser	TV Movie	Writer
1978	Begging the Ring	Feature	Co-writer
