= Colin Gregg =

British director, editor and photographer

Colin Gregg (born 10 January 1947) is a British film and television director, editor and photographer. His work includes the films To the Lighthouse (1983), Lamb (1985), and We Think the World of You (1988). He has also directed episodes of television series including Kavanagh QC and Inspector Morse, both starring John Thaw, and the BBC's Screen Two. In addition, Gregg has directed adverts, including the award winning commercial for the British drink Blackcurrant Tango.

== Career ==
Gregg's first film was the 1969 documentary Once upon a Time ... . In 1977, he was the photographer for a series entitled Those We Love to Hate produced by Devon County Educational Television Service for Paignton Zoo's Education Office, including Those We Love to Hate: Bats.

In 1982, Gregg's film Remembrance gave Gary Oldman his film debut. The following year, Gregg directed the BBC's 1983 adaptation of Virginia Woolf's To the Lighthouse, with a cast which included Rosemary Harris, Michael Gough, Kenneth Branagh, and Suzanne Bertish. Reviewing the film in The New York Times, John J. O'Connor began by noting, "Few works of literature would seem to lend themselves less readily to dramatization than Virginia Woolf's To the Lighthouse, but the BBC and Colin Gregg Ltd. have made the effort and the result is very special indeed"; although, he added, "Purists should be warned that changes have been made". He concluded by writing, "Colin Gregg's direction relies openly and rewardingly on the cool distancing manner of Ingmar Bergman in remaining faithful to the tone and mood of Mrs. Woolf. With Alan Shallcross as producer, the admirable dedication of all concerned is apparent throughout." To the Lighthouse was nominated for a British Academy of Film and Television Arts (BAFTA) award in the Best Single Drama category in 1984.

Gregg directed British drama film Lamb in 1985; it starred Liam Neeson, Hugh O'Conor (in his first film appearance) and Ian Bannen. The film was based on the novel by Bernard MacLaverty, who also wrote the screenplay, and won the Prize of the Ecumenical Jury at the 1986 Locarno International Film Festival. In 1988, Gregg worked with Gary Oldman again in We Think the World of You, which also starred Alan Bates. It was adapted from J. R. Ackerley's novel of the same name.

He directed the first two episodes of Kavanagh QC, "Nothing but the Truth" and "Heartland", in 1995, as well as the episode "A Sense of Loss" in the following year's Series 2.

The 1996 television St George advertisement for the British drink Blackcurrant Tango, which was directed by Gregg, won several awards, including a Cannes Gold Lion and a D&AD silver Pencil, and in 2008 was voted number 2 in the funniest TV adverts of all time in an online poll organised by advertising industry publication Campaign. It also won the grand prize in the 1997 London International Advertising Awards, but was also one of the top 10 most complained about adverts reported to the Independent Television Commission in 1996, with complainants citing it as 'insulting and xenophobic'.
