= Nigel Humphreys =

British actor (born 1950)

- Born: Nigel Jeremy Humphreys; 24 September 1950 (age 75); Bognor Regis, West Sussex, England
- Occupation: actor

Nigel Humphreys (born 24 September 1950 in Bognor Regis, Sussex) is a British actor who is best known for his television work.

== Career ==
At the age of 14, he attended auditions at the National Youth Theatre after his mother saw an advertisement in the newspaper and was accepted. However, they discovered later she had misread the advertisement, which gave the minimum age as 15. This lucky fluke launched Humphreys on his career, appearing in Shakespearean plays and playing the lead in the NYT's production of Peter Terson's football play Zigger Zagger at the West End, as well as the TV adaption, the latter being his small screen debut.

His most prominent roles include Dickie Fleming in Coronation Street and PC Pete Dodds in Softly, Softly: Task Force.

Other television credits include Dixon of Dock Green, Z-Cars, The Expert, Warship, The Sweeney, Blake's 7, The Professionals, Minder, The Gentle Touch, Doctor Who (in the serial Warriors of the Deep), All in Good Faith, Pulaski, No Job for a Lady, The Bill and Birds of a Feather. His film credits include Danny Jones (1972), Joseph Andrews (1977), Scum (1979), The Great Riviera Bank Robbery (1979), The Long Good Friday (1980), Breaking Glass (1980), Who Dares Wins (1982) and Lamb (1985).

== Personal life ==
On 14 March 1970, Humphreys married dancer (Margaret Yvonne) Michele Barrie (actual surname Bullock) at Caxton Hall in Westminster.

== Filmography ==
Year	Title	Role	Notes
1972	Danny Jones	Jim Harper	
1974	Dead Cert	Sergeant	
1977	Joseph Andrews	Birdcatcher	
1978	The Class of Miss MacMichael	Basketball fan	
1979	The Great Riviera Bank Robbery	Alex	
1979	Scum	Taylor	
1979	Big Wheels and Sailor	Mike Harvey	
1980	Breaking Glass	Brian	
1980	The Long Good Friday	Dave	
1982	Who Dares Wins	Sgt. Pope	
1983	The Jigsaw Man	Petrol Attendant	
1985	Lamb	Policeman	
