= Danny Jones (film) =

1972 British film by Jules Bricken

- Theatrical Release Poster
- Directed by: Jules Bricken
- Written by: James Lincoln Collier (novel); Alene Bricken; Jules Bricken
- Produced by: Don Getz; Harry Woolveridge
- Starring: Frank Finlay; Jane Carr; Len Jones
- Cinematography: Davis Boulton
- Edited by: Barry Peters
- Music by: David Whitaker
- Production company: Oakshire Productions
- Distributed by: Cinerama Releasing (UK)
- Release date: May 1972
- Running time: 91 minutes
- Country: United Kingdom
- Language: English

Danny Jones is a 1972 British romantic drama film directed by Jules Bricken and starring Frank Finlay, Jane Carr and Len Jones. It was wriiten by James Lincoln Collier, Alene Bricken and Jules Bricken, based on Collier's 1968 novel Fires of Youth.

== Plot ==
Danny Jones is a 17-year-old young man in Wales who lives and works with his father. When their carpentry and plumbing operation takes them to a boarding school, Danny meets Angie, an 18-year-old girl. He and Angie develop feelings for each other and eventually fall in love.

The film focuses on Danny's relationship with Angie and his abusive, dominant father whom Angie convinces Danny to stand up to.

== Cast ==
- Frank Finlay as Mr. Jones
- Jane Carr as Angie Dickson
- Len Jones as Danny Jones
- Jenny Hanley as Sue
- Nigel Humphreys as Jim Harper
- Marianne Stone as woman in hotel
- Raymond Young as Mr. Dickson
- Andria Lawrence as ice cream girl
- Phillip Ross as Mr. Harper

== Production ==
The film was shot on location in North Wales and at Goldhawk Studios, Shepherd's Bush, London, England.

== Critical reception ==
Monthly Film Bulletin said "Almost a Welsh Pookie. Most of the attention goes to the peculiarly baffled relationship between the two teenagers (one painfully withdrawn, the other desperately extroverted). But while the frustrations of the beginning are perceptively handled, there is a scattering of over-explicit scenes towards the end ... and the happy conclusion comes at a glib rush. Jules Bricken directs from his own screenplay, and if his film ultimately fails to establish itself very clearly, this seems more a fault of the writing than of anything else. Indeed, after the finely characterised conflict of the opening sequences – with Frank Finlay as a heavy father more dependent on emotional blackmail than physical threat, and Len Jones' Danny a study in puzzled acquiescence – the relationship between father and son gradually slips away through a lack of writing: something more needs to be said about the motives and feelings of both sides in the final confrontation, and about the uneasiness of the ostensibly happy balance with which the film ends."

John Coleman wrote in the New Statesman: "Danny Jones is a misfire about a young Welsh lad (Len Jones) mollocking with an amply proportioned Young Lady from the posh local school. Jane Carr is brave as the uglyish duckling who puts out to get attention and Frank Finlay is the boy's gruff but derstanding da."
