= We Think the World of You =

- VHS cover
- Directed by: Colin Gregg
- Written by: J. R. Ackerley (novel); Hugh Stoddart (screenplay)
- Produced by: Tomasso Jandelli; Paul Cowan
- Starring: Gary Oldman; Alan Bates; Max Wall; Liz Smith; Frances Barber
- Cinematography: Michael Garfath
- Edited by: Peter Delfgou
- Music by: Julian Jacobson; Jeremy Sands
- Production company: Cinecom Pictures
- Release dates: 16 September 1988 (Toronto Film Festival); 23 December 1988 (New York); 22 September 1989 (UK)
- Running time: 92 min.
- Countries: United Kingdom; United States
- Language: English
- Budget: £1.36 million
- Box office: $20,998 (US)

We Think the World of You is a 1988 film directed by Colin Gregg and starring Gary Oldman and Alan Bates. It was adapted by Hugh Stoddart from the 1960 J. R. Ackerley novel of the same name. It was produced by Tomasso Jandelli and Cinecom Pictures.

== Plot ==
In post-war London an aimless young married bisexual man, Johnny, is sent to prison. He is forced to entrust his beloved Alsatian dog, Evie, to the reluctant care of his down-trodden parents and older, middle-class ex-lover and best friend, Frank. After a series of visits to Johnny's parents' home, Frank bonds with the dog whose mischievous spirit reminds him of his incarcerated friend. As it becomes apparent to Frank that Johnny's father is beating the dog, who is left for days on end in a small yard, a class war erupts over Evie's welfare, exacerbated by Johnny's manipulative and antagonistic wife Megan, whose sole aim is to claim Johnny back from Frank on his forthcoming release. A set of tragi-comic relationships evolve with the dog coming to represent the hold they have over each other.

== Cast ==
- Alan Bates as Frank Meadows
- Max Wall as Tom
- Liz Smith as Millie
- Frances Barber as Megan
- Gary Oldman as Johnny
- Barbara New as Mrs. Grant

== Release ==
We Think the World of You had its premiere at the 1988 Toronto International Film Festival on September 16, 1988.

== Reception ==
We Think the World of You has not garnered enough reviews at Rotten Tomatoes to produce an overall rating. Roger Ebert gave the film 3/4 stars, writing: "This is a film that rewards attention. It is wise and perceptive about human nature and it sees how all of us long for love and freedom as well as how the undeserved, unrequited love of an animal is sometimes so much more meaningful than the crabbed, grudging, selfish terms that are often laid down by human beings."

== Home Video ==
We Think the World of You was released in the US on VHS and laserdisc in 1989 by Orion Home Video. It was released in the UK on DVD in 2011 by Guerilla Films.
