= To the Lighthouse (film) =

- Genre: Drama
- Based on: To the Lighthouse by Virginia Woolf
- Written by: Hugh Stoddart
- Directed by: Colin Gregg
- Starring: Rosemary Harris; Michael Gough; Suzanne Bertish
- Theme music composer: Julian Dawson-Lyell
- Country of origin: United Kingdom
- Original language: English

Production
- Producers: Alan Shallcross; David Wilkinson; Keith Williams
- Cinematography: Richard Andry; Ken Westbury
- Editor: Dan Rae
- Production companies: BBC; Colin Gregg Films

Original release
- Release: 23 March 1983

To the Lighthouse is a 1983 television film based on the 1927 novel by Virginia Woolf. It was adapted by Hugh Stoddart, directed by Colin Gregg, and produced by Alan Shallcross.

== Premise ==
The scene is set in a delightful holiday home in Cornwall, England, overlooked by a distant lighthouse, where an English family and assorted guests are enjoying a long and warm Edwardian summer.

Mrs Ramsay (Rosemary Harris) is a beautiful, generous and yet dominant woman who spends much time with her children in order to compensate for their father's lack of attention. Her charisma captivates them all - her eccentric, intellectual and demanding husband, her flock of children, the lovers, the independent but incomplete woman artist, the awkward young academic. She flatters vanities, builds friendships and protects her own. Her husband (Michael Gough) is her opposite; where she creates harmony he is rude, angry, impatient and often callous. He even feels a degree of resentment towards his family as if they are partly responsible for his failure to produce the great work that he so desperately strives for. The inevitable tension soon reveals itself; James, the youngest child at six, is seen in a rage of disappointment, thwarted yet again by his father in his one great desire - to go on a boat trip to the lighthouse.

The impatience begins to reveal itself in all the Ramsay children. The elder ones dreaming of other summer places; they are tired of being called upon endlessly to play their parts in the 'family'. The younger ones, particularly Camilla (Jessie Walker Stewart), who is seven, and James, feel threatened by their father, who competes for their mother's love. They begin to hate him.

The simple events of the holiday follow one another – cricket on the beach, outings and long walks - in this colony set in the midst of a detached rural community. Beneath this fun however, a force endangering the family's very existence, threatens to prise it apart forever. The weather deteriorates towards the end of the warm summer and the possibility of a trip to the lighthouse recedes. Summer's end sees the end also of the family bonds – torn asunder by human conflict. The ravages of the First World War brings death to the family and the next time they meet at their house by the sea, it is a very different atmosphere to the one they all remembered. Mr. Ramsay finally organises a trip to the lighthouse, as if seeking forgiveness from his now grown-up children. They in turn see their father in a new light. James realises the complexities of his father's character, and slowly the past becomes a blur and the spirit of the family is rekindled.

== Cast ==
The cast included:

- Rosemary Harris as Mrs Ramsay
- Michael Gough as Mr Ramsay
- Kenneth Branagh as Charles Tansley
- Suzanne Bertish as Lily Briscoe

== Critical reception ==
Reviewing the film in The New York Times, John J. O'Connor began by noting, "Few works of literature would seem to lend themselves less readily to dramatization than Virginia Woolf's To the Lighthouse, but the BBC and Colin Gregg Ltd. have made the effort and the result is very special indeed"; although, he added, "Purists should be warned that changes have been made". He concluded by writing, "Colin Gregg's direction relies openly and rewardingly on the cool distancing manner of Ingmar Bergman in remaining faithful to the tone and mood of Mrs. Woolf. With Alan Shallcross as producer, the admirable dedication of all concerned is apparent throughout."

To the Lighthouse was nominated for a British Academy of Film and Television Arts (BAFTA) award in the Best Single Drama category in 1984.
