= Waiting for You (film) =

- Directed by: Charles Garrad
- Written by: Hugh Stoddart and Charles Garrad
- Produced by: Simon Bosanquet; Chris Curling; Benjamin Greenacre
- Starring: Colin Morgan; Fanny Ardant
- Cinematography: David Raedeker
- Production company: Zephyr Films
- Release date: 2017
- Countries: France; United Kingdom
- Languages: English; French

Waiting for You is a 2017 British mystery drama film directed by Charles Garrad, and co-written by Garrad and Hugh Stoddart. It stars Colin Morgan and Fanny Ardant with Audrey Bastien and Abdelkrim Bahloul featured in supporting roles.

== Plot summary ==
The film follows the protagonist Paul Ashton, who, after his father's death, discovers a mysterious French postcard among his father's possessions, and "compelled by grief and curiosity" drives to the south of France to investigate his father's increasingly disturbing military past. There "he meets an eccentric older woman and unearths truths about the father he never really knew" and becomes suspicious of this reclusive, melancholic and probably dangerous woman, the pianist Madeleine Brown. He pretends to be an architecture student interested in Madeleine Brown's isolated country house, in order to look for clues about his father's past. In the process he meets and becomes friends with a young local woman Sylvie.

== Cast ==
=== Main cast ===
- Colin Morgan as Paul Ashton

A young man who goes to France to look for something he thinks is owed to his dead father.

- Fanny Ardant as Madeleine Brown

A mysterious, melancholic and probably dangerous older woman who is suspicious of Paul Ashton.

=== Supporting cast ===
- Audrey Bastien as Sylvie

The lively daughter of a bar owner, she directs Paul Ashton to "Madame Brown's".

- Abdelkrim Bahloul as Ahmed

The Algerian retainer, who is doing his best to maintain Madeleine Brown's house.

=== Minor cast ===
- Clare Holman as Janet
- Norah Lehembre as Celine
- Bellamine Abdelmalek as Hassan
- Fergus Craig as Dave
- Vincent Jouan as Antoine
- Sam Cox as Len
- Jacky Nercessian as Archivist
- Daniel Poyser as Tony
- Fred Pearson as Fred
- Pamela Betsy Cooper as Mourner
- Rachel Gill as Funeral Attender
- Sona Vyas as Nurse
- Atlantik Bikliqi as Funeral Attender
- John Neville Family Member

== Production ==
=== Development ===
Artist and Production designer Charles Garrad makes his feature directorial debut on the project, which he describes as "a lyrical mystery." The film, written by Hugh Stoddart and Charles Garrad, was designed by Ben Smith and shot by cinematographer David Raedeker.

=== Casting ===
On 1 June 2015, Colin Morgan and Fanny Ardant were announced to join the cast.

=== Filming ===
It was announced that Waiting for You started principal photography in France on 1 June 2015. The film, funded by private equity, did a shoot for five weeks on location in the Languedoc-Roussillon region of southern France until June 20. Production then moved to Ilford in the UK for a week. Filming ended on 25 June 2015. According to the final credits, locations included Saint-Julien-de-la-Nef, Sumène, Ganges, Brissac and the Château d'Isis. The soundtrack is by Adrian Corker, and also uses a song by Georgie Fame 'Sitting in the Park'.
