= Remembrance (1982 film) =

- Film poster
- Directed by: Colin Gregg
- Written by: Hugh Stoddart
- Produced by: Colin Gregg
- Starring: John Altman; Martin Barrass; David John; Pete Lee-Wilson; Gary Oldman; Ewan Stewart; Nick Dunning; Al Hunter Ashton; Dicken Ashworth; Derek Benfield
- Cinematography: John Metcalfe
- Edited by: Peter Delfgou
- Distributed by: Channel Four Films
- Release date: November 10, 1982
- Running time: 130 minutes
- Country: United Kingdom
- Language: English
- Budget: £325,000

Remembrance is a British ensemble drama about Royal Navy ratings of HMS Raleigh, who are about to embark on a six-month naval exercise. The film is noteworthy for early appearances of several well-known British actors, including Timothy Spall, Lisa Maxwell, John Altman and Gary Oldman in his film debut. It was an early production from Channel Four Films and was shown on 10 November 1982 on Channel 4. It was also one of the first films in the UK to be shown on television less than three years after its initial cinema release (a delay enforced at the time by the Cinema Exhibitors' Association).

== Plot ==
The film does not have a simple plot, but rather cuts between the interweaving stories of several characters, as they prepare for the coming months away at sea. The action centres around the bars and clubs of the Union Street district of Plymouth. One major event that affects all the characters is the hospitalisation and eventual death of Daniel (Gary Oldman) after a violent assault by a nightclub bouncer.

== Production ==
Gregg got the idea for the film from his own experiences as a student at Plymouth Art College. It was largely shot on location, including interior scenes in two Union Street pubs, The Phoenix and The Two Trees.

The film was commissioned by Channel 4, before the channel had started broadcasting and was aired in the first week of the new channel in early November 1982, close to Remembrance Sunday.

Unusually for the time, the film had been given a cinema preview in June 1982 at the Screen on the Hill cinema in Hampstead. This was a purely opportunistic enterprise, taking advantage of the prominent role that the Royal Navy had played in the Falklands War to gain publicity for the film (and the upcoming launch of Channel 4), but it turned out to be a significant event in the relationship between cinema and television in the UK. In Independent Television in Britain (Volume 6, 2003), Paul Bonner and Lesley Aston note that:

With historical perspective this can be seen as a pivotal point in the relationship between cinema and television [...] In the following two years Justin Dukes' formidable negotiating skills were brought to bear on the restrictive practice by the Cinema Exhibitors' Association of preventing any film for cinema showing being shown on television for three years after its release [...] Dukes argued that... if the films could not be shown on television when the channel which had paid for all or part of their cost... then they would not get made. He was successful in getting the embargo lifted for films costing less than £1.25 million (later this was to rise to £2 million). It was a major step forward for the channel and, as it was to turn out, for the cinema industry also.

== Cast ==
- Roger Adamson as Provost Driver
- John Altman as Steve
- Dawn Archibald as Jill
- Sean Arnold as Landlord of The Antelope
- Al Ashton as John
- Dicken Ashworth as Frank
- Sheila Ballantine as Marie
- Martin Barrass as Malcolm
- John Barrett as Jimmy
- Derek Benfield as Vincent's Father
- Jesse Birdsall as Matelot
- Roger Booth as Mark's Father
- Jon Croft as Stan
- Alison Dowling as Student
- Mark Drewry as Harry
- Nick Dunning as Chris
- Peter Ellis as Policeman
- Nick Ellsworth as Naval Provost
- Myra Frances as Teacher At Party
- Michael Godley as Father At Party
- Kenneth Griffith as Joe
- Dave Hill as Paul
- Sally Jane Jackson as Sue
- David John as Mark
- Peter Jonfield as Dave
- Wolf Kahler as Dutch Matelot
- Marjie Lawrence as Mark's Mother
- Pete Lee-Wilson as Vincent
- Doel Luscombe as Landlord of The White Swan
- Tony Mathews as Naval Surgeon
- Lisa Maxwell as Girl At Disco
- Don Munday as The Doorman
- Gary Oldman as Daniel
- Eileen Page as Mother At Party
- Robert John Pittman as Landlord of The Two Trees
- John Price as Naval Officer
- Lawrie Quayle as TV Interviewer
- Anna Rees as Girl At Disco
- John Rutland as Alf
- Timothy Spall as Douglas
- Ewan Stewart as Sean
- Kim Taylforth as Christine
- Flip Webster as Barmaid At Disco
- Michele Winstanley as Gail
- Nicola Wright as Student

== Soundtrack ==
The film uses Aragon by Brian Eno as incidental music.

== Reception ==
Channel 4's regulator, the Independent Broadcasting Authority (IBA), raised concerns about gratuitous use of swearing in the script. The film won the Golden Charybdis Award at the 1982 Taormina International Film Festival.
