= Jane Carr =

British actress

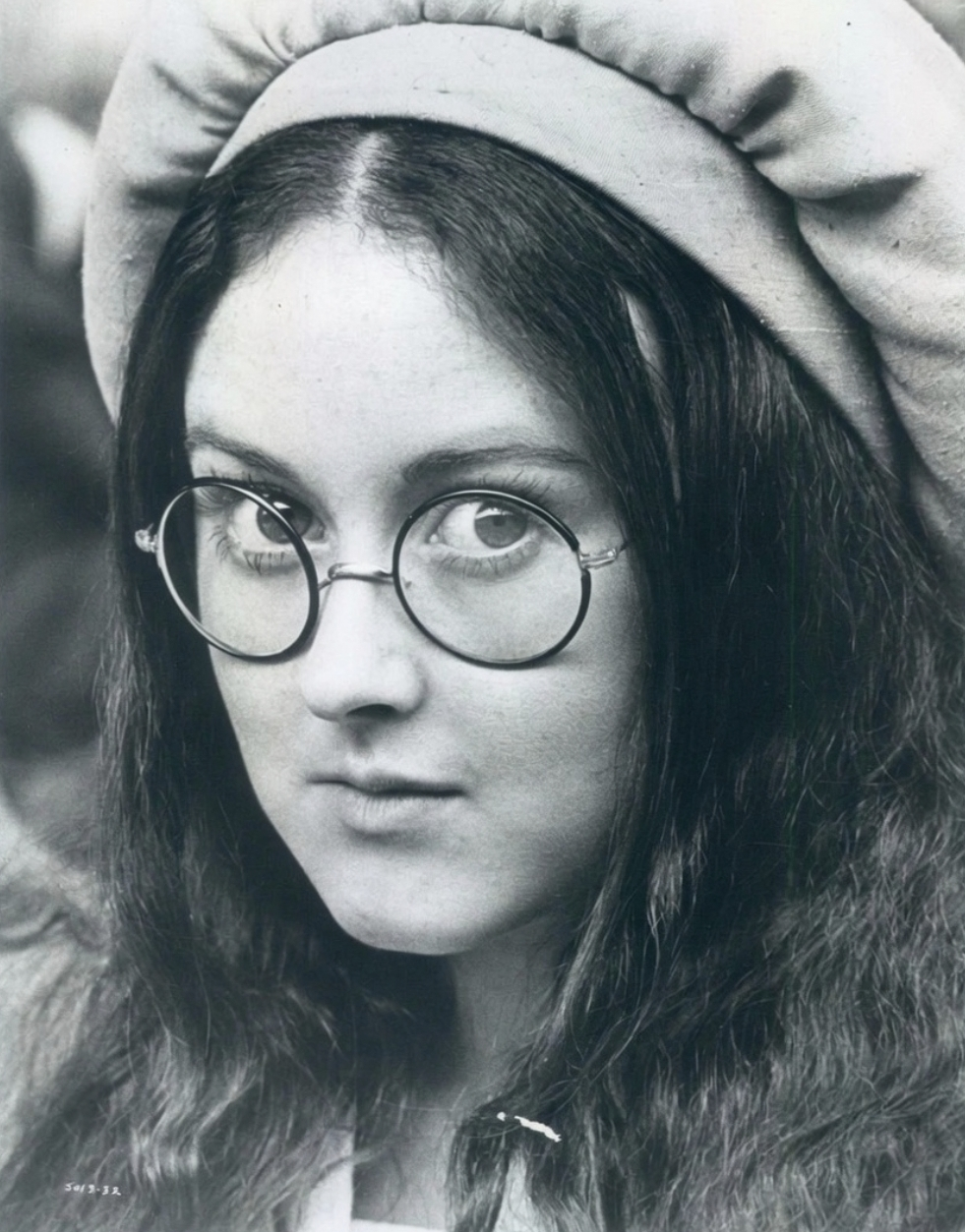
- Carr in Something for Everyone (1970)
- Occupation: Actress
- Years active: 1969–present
- Known for: The Prime of Miss Jean Brodie; Grim & Evil/The Grim Adventures of Billy & Mandy
- Spouse: Mark Arnott (m. 1987; div. 1995)

Jane Carr is an English actress. She is well known for her first film role as Mary McGregor in drama The Prime of Miss Jean Brodie (1969) and the voice role of "Pud'n" on the animated Grim & Evil and The Grim Adventures of Billy & Mandy (US, 2001–2007). She also played a character called "Pudding" in the Jilly Cooper-penned BBC sitcom It's Awfully Bad for Your Eyes, Darling (UK, 1971).

== Career ==
=== Film ===
Her earliest film role was as Mary McGregor in the 1969 British film The Prime of Miss Jean Brodie, directed by Ronald Neame from a screenplay written by Jay Presson Allen, adapted from her own stage play, which was based in turn on the 1961 novel of the same name by Muriel Spark. In this role, like her fellow young actors, she had to portray the character at ages ranging from 11 to 18.

In 1970, she co-starred with Angela Lansbury and Michael York in Something for Everyone, and also starred in Danny Jones (1972) with Frank Finlay. Her other film roles have included the TV movie The Bunker (1981), Deal of a Lifetime (1999), Crazy as Hell (2002), Garfield: A Tail of Two Kitties (2006), Hannah Montana: The Movie (2009) as Lucinda, Editor of Bonchic Magazine, and The Five-Year Engagement (2012). In 2014, she voiced Mrs. Goggins and Granny in Postman Pat: The Movie, and portrays Sister Serpent in the Halloween themed slasher film 31 (2015).

=== Stage ===
Carr received a Laurence Olivier Award nomination in 1977 for her performance as Mary Mooney in the comedy Once a Catholic. She joined the Royal Shakespeare Company in 1978, receiving a second Olivier nomination in 1982 for A Midsummer Night's Dream and appearing in The Tempest, As You Like It, Much Ado About Nothing, The Merchant of Venice and The Merry Wives of Windsor. She played Wendy in the 1982 RSC adaptation of J. M. Barrie's Peter Pan at the Barbican in 1982 and appeared opposite Maggie Smith in the 1985 production of Congreve's The Way of the World.

In 1987, she moved to the United States while touring with the Royal Shakespeare Company's production of The Life and Adventures of Nicholas Nickleby. From 2006 to 2009, she played Mrs. Brill in Mary Poppins on Broadway. Jane was part of the original cast of A Gentleman's Guide to Love and Murder, the Tony Winner for Best Musical in 2014. She played the part of Miss Shingle. In August 2014, she left the role and was succeeded by Carole Shelley. In 2018, Carr appeared in A Shakespeare Jubilee! directed by Louis Fantasia at The Wallis in Beverly Hills.

=== Television ===
In 1969 Jane played Lesley Biddulph in the LWT mini-series "The Gold Robbers". In 1972 Jane was a cast member in an episode of the Granada production, "Crown Court". She appeared in the role of Gillian Heys in the episode "A Genial Man". In 1980, she appeared as Rita in National Pelmet, series two opening episode of the drama Minder (UK, 1979–1994). She also had a prominent part as "Louise" in the American version of TV sitcom Dear John (1988–92).

In 1994, she played Timov (vomit spelled backwards), daughter of Al-ghul (Arabic: الغول, the ghoul), one of the three wives of Londo Mollari in the episode "Soul Mates" on US TV series Babylon 5. She continues to play occasional roles on television, including Fran Metzgar in Curb Your Enthusiasm (US, 2000), besides her voice work. In 2006, she served as both body double and voice actress of "Tabitha Lenox" on the US daytime drama Passions when actress Juliet Mills was on a brief vacation.

In 2002, she played the part of Malcolm Reed's mother, Mary Reed, in the episode "Silent Enemy" of the TV series Star Trek: Enterprise. Carr appeared on an episode of Friends, "The One with Ross's Wedding", and on three episodes of Gilmore Girls. She has also had guest starring and recurring roles on episodes of many other US comedy shows including Wings, Caroline in the City, Monk, Ellen, Becker, Dharma & Greg, Mad About You, and three episodes of Curb Your Enthusiasm.

In 2011, Carr played a resident of the apartment building Alex and Harper lived in on Wizards of Waverly Place. In 2012, she played a nanny, Mrs. Buckminster in a Season 8 episode of How I Met Your Mother. In 2018–19, she appeared as Tabitha, the fairy godmother, on five episodes of Legends of Tomorrow.

In 2020, Carr had a guest role as Betty on the CBS sitcom Mom (season 8, episode 3 - "Tang and a Safe Space for Everybody").

=== Voice acting ===
In 1985, she voiced the dual role of Computer and its Inner Voice in the Doctor Who radio series Slipback (UK, 1985). In 2008, she voiced the character of Grandma Winifred Fletcher in the American Disney animated television series Phineas and Ferb. She also voiced Lady Cecelia in Familias Regnant universe Heris Serrano trilogy graphic audio book.

She also provides the voice of Cosmo's mother Mama Cosma in the Nickelodeon animated series The Fairly OddParents.

== Partial filmography ==
Film
Year	Title	Role	Notes
1969	The Prime of Miss Jean Brodie	Mary McGregor	
1970	Something for Everyone	Lotte Von Ornstein	
1971	Percy	Nurse	
1972	Danny Jones	Angie Dickson	
1988	The Tracey Ullman Show	Helen Haversham	Episode: "Kay's Old Love"
1988–1992	Dear John	Louise Mercer	
1993	Boy Meets World	Mrs. Bertram	Episode: "Boys II Mensa"
1994	Babylon 5	Timov	Episode: "Soul Mates"
1997	Sabrina the Teenage Witch (1996 TV series)	Dr. Bull	Episode: "Sabrina Claus"
1998	Friends	Ticket Agent	Episode: "The One With Ross’s Wedding Part 2"
1999	Austin Powers: The Spy Who Shagged Me	Woman - Pecker	
1999	Blue Streak	Museum Official	
1999	Deal of a Lifetime	Nancy	
1999	Thanks	Nurse Rebecca	Episode: "Privacy"
2001–2008	The Fairly OddParents	Mama Cosma	Various episodes
2002	Crazy as Hell	Nurse Danza	
2002	Treasure Planet	Mrs. Dunwitty	Voice
2005	Gilmore Girls	Nora	3 episodes
2005	Numb3rs	Museum Director (unnamed)	1 episode
2006	Garfield: A Tail of Two Kitties	Mrs. Whitney	
2006	Air Buddies	Mrs. Niggles	
2007	Kim Possible	Nanny Maim	Voice
2008–2011	Phineas and Ferb	Grandma Winifred Fletcher	Voice; 7 episodes
2009	Hannah Montana: The Movie	Lucinda	
2010–2012	Fish Hooks	Ann Chovie / Dan Chovie	Voice; 6 episodes
2011	Wizards of Waverly Place	Martha St. Claire	Episode: "Get Along, Little Zombie"
2011	Two and a Half Men	Sharon Hyde-Tottingham	Episode: "One False Move, Zimbabwe!"
2012	The Five-Year Engagement	Grandma Katherine	
2012	How I Met Your Mother	Mrs. Buckminster	Episode: Nannies
2014	Postman Pat: The Movie	Mrs. Goggins / Granny	Voice
2015	31	Sister Serpent	
2017	Better Things	Jarita	Episode: "White Rock"
2018–2019	Legends of Tomorrow	Fairy Godmother	5 episodes
2020	Coop & Cami Ask the World	Kitty	Episode: "Would You Wrather Rip Your Pants?"
2020	Mom	Betty	Episode: "Tang and a Safe Space for Everybody"
2022	That Girl Lay Lay	Ms. Santalucia	Episode: "Freaky Fri-Day-Day"
2022–2023	Willow	The Crone	2 episodes
2023	Stillwater	Grandma / Royal Advisor	2 episodes
2024	Rock, Paper, Scissors	Garbage Queen	Episode: "Trash"
