= List of awards and nominations received by Liam Neeson =

Liam Neeson awards and nominations
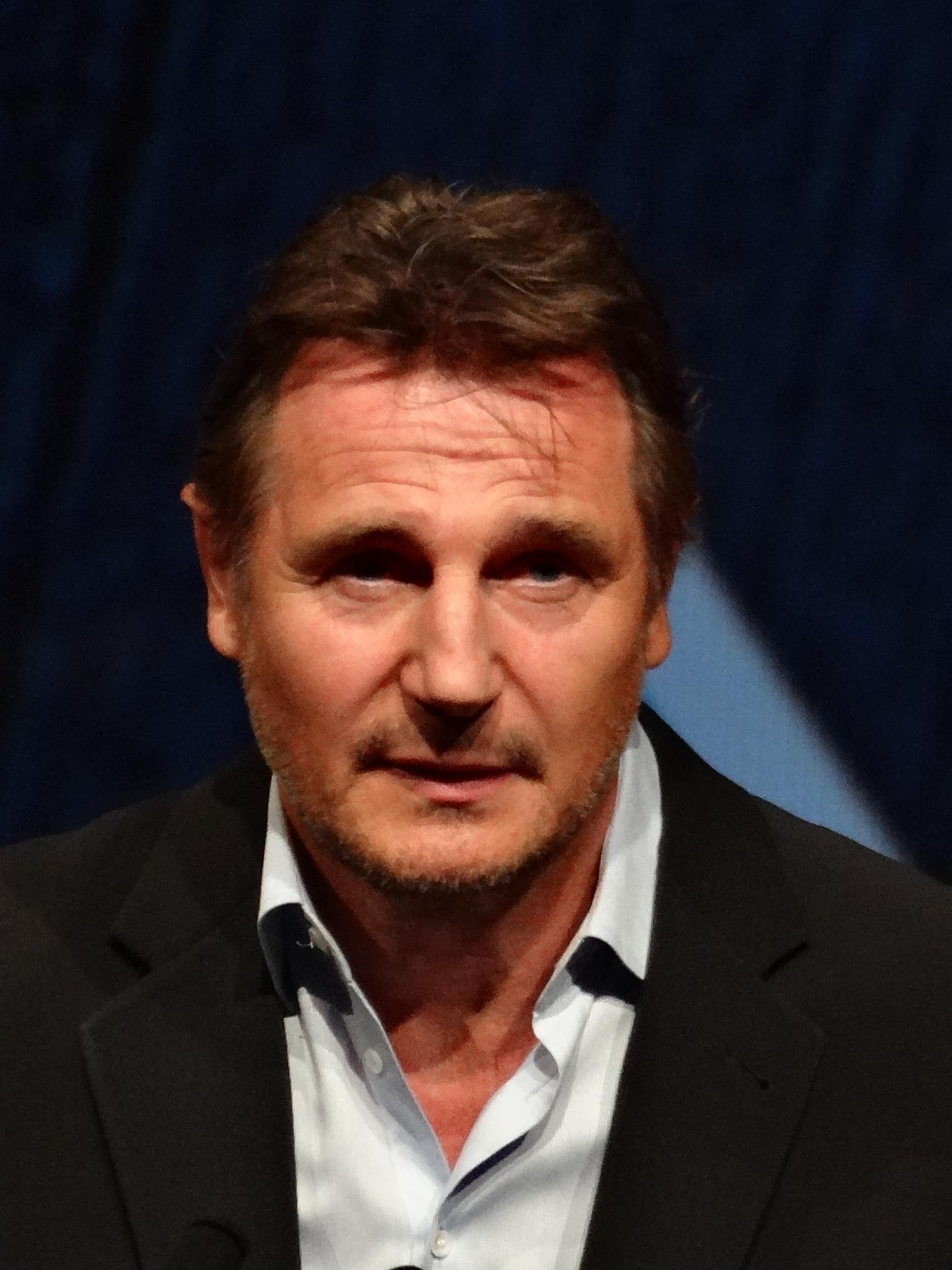
- Neeson at the Deauville Film Festival in 2012
Awards and nominations
Award	Wins	Nominations
Academy Awards	0	1
BAFTA Awards	0	1
Critics' Choice Awards	0	2
Golden Globes	0	3
Grammy Awards	0	1
Tony Awards	0	2

Totals (Note: Certain award groups do not simply award one winner. They acknowledge several different recipients, have runners-up, and have third place. Since this is a specific recognition and is different from losing an award, runner-up mentions are considered wins in this award tally. For simplification and to avoid errors, each award in this list has been presumed to have had a prior nomination.)
- Wins: 4
- Nominations: 30

This is a list of awards and nominations received by Liam Neeson.

Liam Neeson is an Irish actor known for his leading roles on stage and screen. He has taken roles in franchise films, prestige dramas, historical epics, and action films. Over his career, he has received various accolades including nominations for an Academy Award, a British Academy Film Award, two Critics' Choice Movie Awards, three Golden Globe Awards, a Grammy Award, an Independent Spirit Award and two Tony Awards. Neeson was appointed Officer of the Order of the British Empire (OBE) by Queen Elizabeth II in her 2000 New Year Honours.

Neeson rose to prominence when he starred in the title role as German industrialist Oskar Schindler who is credited with saving the lives of 1,200 Jews during the Holocaust in Steven Spielberg's historical epic drama Schindler's List (1993). For his performance he was nominated for the Academy Award for Best Actor, the BAFTA Award for Best Actor in a Leading Role, and the Golden Globe Award for Best Actor – Motion Picture Drama. He portrayed the Irish revolutionary Michael Collins in the biographical historical drama film Michael Collins (1996) earning the Volpi Cup for Best Actor as well as a nomination for the Golden Globe Award for Best Actor in a Motion Picture – Drama. He portrayed American biologist and sexologist Dr. Alfred Kinsey in Kinsey (2004) for which he won the Los Angeles Film Critics Association Award for Best Actor and was nominated for the Golden Globe Award for Best Actor in a Motion Picture – Drama and the Independent Spirit Award for Best Male Lead.

Also known for his roles in franchise films, he played Dr. Peyton Westlake / Darkman in the superhero film Darkman (1990) for which he was nominated for the Saturn Award for Best Actor. He portrayed Jedi Master Qui-Gon Jinn in the George Lucas space opera Star Wars: Episode I – The Phantom Menace (1999) for which he was nominated for the MTV Movie Award for Best Fight and the Saturn Award for Best Actor. He then took on the dual role of Henri Ducard / Ra's al Ghul in the Christopher Nolan directed superhero action film Batman Begins (2005) for which he earned nominations for the Saturn Award for Best Supporting Actor and the MTV Movie Award for Best Fight. He also starred in the British romantic comedy ensemble film Love Actually (2003) for which he was nominated for the Phoenix Film Critics Society for Best Actor.

On stage, Neeson portrayed Mat Burke in the Broadway revival of Eugene O'Neill's Anna Christie (1992) and John Proctor in the revival of Arthur Miller's The Crucible (2001-2002) for which he was nominated for two Tony Awards for Best Actor in a Play. He was nominated for the Grammy Award for Best Spoken Word Album for Children for his voice work reading The Polar Express (2001) at the 43rd Annual Grammy Awards.

== Major associations ==
=== Academy Awards ===
Year	Category	Nominated work	Result	Ref.
1994	Best Actor	Schindler's List	Nominated	

=== BAFTA Awards ===
Year	Category	Nominated work	Result	Ref.
British Academy Film Awards
1994	Best Actor in a Leading Role	Schindler's List	Nominated	

=== Critics' Choice Awards ===
Year	Category	Nominated work	Result	Ref.
Critics' Choice Super Awards
2022	Best Actor in an Action Movie	The Ice Road	Nominated	
Critics' Choice Television Awards
2016	Best Guest Performer in a Comedy Series	Inside Amy Schumer	Nominated	

=== Golden Globe Awards ===
Year	Category	Nominated work	Result	Ref.
1994	Best Actor – Motion Picture Drama	Schindler's List	Nominated	
1997	Best Actor – Motion Picture Drama	Michael Collins	Nominated	
2005	Best Actor – Motion Picture Drama	Kinsey	Nominated	

=== Grammy Awards ===
Year	Category	Nominated work	Result	Ref.
2001	Best Spoken Word Album for Children	The Polar Express	Nominated	

=== Tony Awards ===
Year	Category	Nominated work	Result	Ref.
1993	Best Actor in a Play	Anna Christie	Nominated	
2002	Best Actor in a Play	The Crucible	Nominated	

== Miscellaneous awards ==
Organizations	Year	Category	Work	Result	Ref.
Chicago Film Critics Association	1993	Best Actor	Schindler's List	Won	
Chicago Film Critics Association	1996	Best Actor	Michael Collins	Nominated	
Dallas–Fort Worth Film Critics Association	1993	Best Actor	Schindler's List	Nominated	
Drama Desk Awards	2002	Outstanding Actor in a Play	The Crucible	Nominated	
Evening Standard British Film Awards	1996	Best Actor	Michael Collins	Won	
Independent Spirit Awards	2004	Best Male Lead	Kinsey	Nominated	
Irish Film and Television Academy	2004	Best Actor	Kinsey	Won	
Irish Film and Television Academy	2009	Actor in a Lead Role	Five Minutes of Heaven	Nominated	
London Film Critics' Circle	1993	Actor of the Year	Schindler's List	Nominated	
London Film Critics' Circle	2004	Actor of the Year	Kinsey	Nominated	
Los Angeles Film Critics Association	2004	Best Actor	Kinsey	Won	
MTV Movie Awards	1999	Best Fight	Star Wars: Episode I – The Phantom Menace	Nominated	
MTV Movie Awards	2005	Best Fight	Batman Begins	Nominated	
Phoenix Film Critics Society	2003	Best Actor	Love Actually	Nominated	
Outer Critics Circle Award	2002	Outstanding Actor in a Play	The Crucible	Nominated	
Razzie Awards	2012	Worst Supporting Actor	Battleship	Nominated	
Satellite Awards	2004	Best Actor – Motion Picture	Kinsey	Nominated	
Saturn Awards	1990	Best Actor	Darkman	Nominated	
Saturn Awards	1999	Best Actor	Star Wars: Episode I – The Phantom Menace	Nominated	
Saturn Awards	2005	Best Supporting Actor	Batman Begins	Nominated	
Theater World Award	1993	Distinguished Performance	Anna Christie	Won	
Vancouver Film Critics Circle	2004	Best Actor	Kinsey	Nominated	
Venice International Film Festival	1996	Volpi Cup for Best Actor	Michael Collins	Won	

== Honorary awards ==
Organizations	Year	Award	Result	Ref.
British Independent Film Award	2010	Variety Award	Honored	
Camerimage	2010	Krzysztof Kieślowski Award	Honored	
Irish Film & Television Academy	2016	Outstanding Contribution to Cinema Award	Honored	
Queen’s University Belfast	2009	Honorary Doctorate	Honored	
Queen Elizabeth II	1999	Officer of the Order of the British Empire (OBE)	Honored	
Palm Springs International Film Festival	2005	Lifetime Achievement Award	Honored	
Savannah Film Festival	2010	Outstanding Achievement in Cinema	Honored	
Taormina International Film Festival	2000	Career Achievement Award	Honored	
