= Pete Lee-Wilson =

British actor (born 1960)

- Born: Peter Lee Wilson; 7 April 1960 (age 66); Wrexham, Wales
- Occupation: Actor
- Years active: 1980–present

Pete Lee-Wilson (born 7 April 1960) is a British television and film actor.

== Career ==
His first role was in the television show Metal Mickey. He has also appeared in The Bill, Spooks and the 2009 Doctor Who story "The End of Time".

== Personal life ==
His parents were both performers on stage, and his mother also ran a dancing school in Exmouth, Devon.

== Filmography ==
Film
Year	Title	Role	Notes
1982	Remembrance	Vincent	
1984	The Bounty	William Purcell	
1985	De flyvende djævle	′′Mory Ventura′′	
1986	Sid and Nancy	Duke Bowman	
1987	Out of Order	Billy Bannister	
1988	A Chorus of Disapproval	Crispin Usher	
1990	The Garden	Devil	
1991	A Demon in My View	Man on Car Park	
1995	Joseph	Gad	
1996	Crimtetime	Winfield LaGrave	
1997	Solomon	Ahlijah	
1998	Dead on Time	Steve	
2000	Newborn	Craig White	Credited as Peter-Lee Wilson
2002	Blade II	Blood Bank Doctor/Reaper	Credited as Pete Lee-Wilson
2004	Nature Unleashed: Earthquake	Mikael	Credited as Peter Lee-Wilson
2004	Roulette	Dark Man	
2005	7 Seconds	Alexsie Kutchinov	
2007	Blood and Chocolate	Krall	Credited as Pete Lee-Wilson
Television
Year	Title	Role	Notes
1980	Metal Mickey	Harry	One Episode: School Master Mickey
1981	The Gaffer	Lenny	One Episode: The Trouble with Women
1981	BBC2 Playhouse	Mike	One Episode: Bobby Wants to Meet Me
1981	West End Tales	Youth	One Episode: Mug Punter
1981	Maybury	Don Winter	One Episode: Ten Green Bottles
1981	Big Jim and the Figaro Club	Archie	One Episode: Hearts of Oak
1982	Shelley	Youth	One Episode: No News is Good
1982	Radio Phoenix	Danny Coles	Episode(s) Unknown
1982	Play for Today	Scarface	One Episode: A Mother Like Him
1983	Crown Court	Steve O'Reilly	One Episode: A Sword in the Hand of David
1983	Jemima Shore Investigates	Role Unknown	One Episode: High Style
1985	C.A.T.S. Eyes	Steve Dermot	One Episode: Love Byte
1987	Drummonds	Dave Bassett	Two Episodes: Publish and be Damned and Old Flames
1989	The Paradise Club	DC Milligan	Seven Episodes: Sudden Death Tango, Crack in the Mirror, Bring on the Cavalry, Up Jumped a Swagperson, Short Story, Sins of the Father: 1 and Sins of the Fathers: Part 2
1990	She-Wolf of London	Pitak	One Episode
1992	Moon and Son	Dennis Arthur	One Episode: Where No Birds Sing
1992	Inspector Morse	Paul – Journalist	One Episode: Absolute Conviction
1992	Men Behaving Badly	John	One Episode: People Behaving Irritatingly: Credited as Pete Lee Wilson
1996	Our Friends in the North	Colin Butler	Two Episodes: 1979 and 1987
1996	Bugs	Tangsen	One Episode: Newton's Run
1997	Wycliffe	Kevin Kessell	One Episode: Bad Blood: credited as Peter Lee-Wilson
1998	The Broker's Man	D.I. Martin	One Episode: Keyman
1998	McCallum	Larry	One Episode: Beyond Good and Evil
1990–2000	The Bill	Various guest roles: Middleman, Corkscrew, Lost Boy, Butter Wouldn't Melt, Good Faith: Part 3, Det. Supt Steve Hodges: Warm Bodies: Part 1, Warm Bodies: Part 2, Love or Money, Room Service, Touch and Go, Fake Fur, In Safe Hands, Find the Lady,, Fifty-Fifty, The River, All Fall Down: Part 1, and All Fall Down: Part 2	
1987–2002	Casualty	Terry Mullett, Billy, Lee Reed, and Brian Foster	Four Episodes: Fun Night, Sacrifice, Truth or Dare and Déjà vu
2003	Down to Earth	Steve Hogg	Four Episodes: The Poseidon Effect, Honesty and High Hopes
2003	M.I.T.: Murder Investigation Team	Paul Wainwright	One Episode: Daddy's Little Girl: Credited as Peter Lee Wilson
2007	Spooks	Nick Ronson	One Episode: Episode No. 6.1
2009	Doctors	Roger Hamilton	One Episode: Lucky
2009	Doctor Who	Tommo	One Episode: "The End of Time"
2013	EastEnders	Pogo	One Episode
2013	Downton Abbey Christmas Special	Porter	One Episode
