= Lamb (1986 film) =

- Directed by: Colin Gregg
- Written by: Bernard MacLaverty
- Based on: Lamb (1980 novel) by Bernard MacLaverty
- Produced by: Neil Zeiger
- Starring: Liam Neeson; Hugh O'Conor; Ian Bannen
- Cinematography: Michael Garfath
- Edited by: Peter Delfgou
- Music by: Van Morrison
- Production company: Flickers Productions; Limehouse Productions; Channel Four Films
- Distributed by: Film4 Productions (UK)
- Release dates: October 1985 (Chicago); 10 October 1986 (Ireland); 6 November 1986 (Belfast)
- Running time: 110 minutes
- Countries: United Kingdom; Ireland
- Language: English
- Budget: £1.26 million

Lamb is a 1986 drama film directed by Colin Gregg from a screenplay by Bernard MacLaverty and starring Liam Neeson, Ian Bannen, and Hugh O'Conor in his film debut. Based on the MacLaverty's 1980 novel, it tells the story of a young, conflicted Christian Brother (Neeson) who works at a boys' reform school, and becomes a surrogate father to the institution's most troubled member. The musical score was written by Van Morrison.

The film premiered at the 1985 Chicago International Film Festival, where it was nominated for Best Feature Film.

== Plot ==
Brother Sebastian is a young Christian Brother who works in a Roman Catholic borstal on the west coast of northern Ireland, referred to as "a finishing school for the sons of the Idle Poor" by its head, Brother Benedict. There, the Brothers teach boys to conform in a harsh, uncompromising regime which Brother Sebastian, whose real name is Michael Lamb, finds deeply distasteful. The Brothers teach the boys "a little of God and a lot of fear."

When his father dies, leaving him a small legacy, the tie which kept him at the home is gone and he decides to leave and take Owen Kane, a bullied, unhappy 10-year-old boy with him. His decision is also affected by the fact that he has made a vow of poverty and Brother Benedict expects him to hand his inheritance over to the Brothers.

Michael has formed an attachment to Owen. He is the youngest boy there and has been in the home for two years. Brother Benedict beats him for painting graffiti on the wall outside, because it ends with the word OK – Owen's initials – despite knowing that it was not Owen who did it. Owen comes from a broken family and a drunken, abusive father. Michael cannot see how he will survive there and wishes to give him his freedom.

He secretly leaves the school and takes Owen with him to London hoping to be the boy's saviour, although he knows he is committing a criminal act. They pass themselves off as father and son and move from hotel to hotel. Michael lets Owen smoke, play on gaming machines and takes him to a football match to see his favourite team Arsenal play, but Owen, an epileptic, has a fit. They have to slip away from the medical centre before questions are asked.

Owen sometimes prattles on and on and sometimes just sits silently. Michael feels embarrassed during the silences and recognises that Owen controls the communication between them. As the days and weeks go by, Michael became more comfortable with the silences and they laugh a lot.

As his money dwindles and news of the kidnapping reaches the English community, with Owen's picture in the newspaper, Michael finds himself running out of ideas on how to save the boy's life. About to fly back to Ireland, they come across an ex-army man called Haddock who tells them about a nearby squat and says they can move in. Michael returns to the hotel to find Owen in floods of tears, thinking Michael has left him. In an emotional scene, Michael tells Owen he loves him and man and boy hug and hold each other tight.

Michael gets a job, leaving Owen at the squat, but returns to find that Haddock, who he knows is gay, is in his dressing gown, has his arm around the boy's shoulders and has been letting Owen smoke pot. Michael is worried Haddock may have molested the boy, or will try to, and decides they have to leave.

Determined to save Owen from being forced to return to the home, but realizing he cannot look after the boy himself because of the frequency of the seizures and his inability to monitor them, Michael drowns him in the sea during Owen's next seizure, after hearing him describe the experience of a seizure as a form of joy. The drowning is portrayed as a baptism as Michael calls out to God while holding Owen under the water. Having murdered the boy, Michael tries to drown himself, but is unable to. The movie ends with the sun setting, Owen's body lying on the sand and Michael hugging his knees and looking off in deep thought.

== Cast ==
- Liam Neeson as Michael Lamb / "Brother Sebastian"
- Hugh O'Conor as Owen Kane
- Ian Bannen as Brother Benedict
- Harry Towb as Priest
- Frances Tomelty as Mrs. Kane
- Ronan Wilmot as Brother Fintan
- Denis Carey as Mr. Lamb
- David Gorry as O'Donnell
- Andrew Pickering as Murphy
- Stuart O'Connor as O'Holloran
- Ian McElhinney as Maguire
- Dudley Sutton as Haddock
- Nigel Humphreys as Policeman
- Eileen Kennally as Neighbour Woman
- Lorna Ellis as Shy Girl

== Production ==
The film was shot in London, Liverpool, Cornwall, and Northern Ireland. Though the (fictional) St. Kiaran's Reformatory is supposed to be on the west coast of Northern Ireland, it was portrayed by Tintagel Castle in North Cornwall.

== Release ==
The film premiered at the 1985 Chicago International Film Festival, where it was nominated for Best Feature Film.

It was released in Ireland in October 1986, and premiered in Belfast that November 6th. It was not released in the United States until 1995, when Liam Neeson was a more well-known actor thanks to Schindler's List.

== Reception ==
=== Critical response ===
In a positive review for The New York Times, Stephen Holden writes "From its opening scenes in a modern Dickensian home for throwaway children to its agonizing final sequence on a deserted beach, Colin Gregg's fine and disturbing film "Lamb" conveys a sinking feeling of dread. As this story of a man who recklessly sacrifices himself trying to save an emotionally damaged child unwinds, that dread steadily mounts."

=== Awards and nominations ===
Award	Year	Category	Nominee	Result
Chicago International Film Festival	1985	Gold Hugo	Colin Gregg	Nominated
Locarno Film Festival	1986	Bronze Leopard	Colin Gregg	Won
Locarno Film Festival	1986	Prize of the Ecumenical Jury	Colin Gregg	Won

== See also ==
- Congregation of Christian Brothers
