= Adrian Corker =

British musician (born 1989)

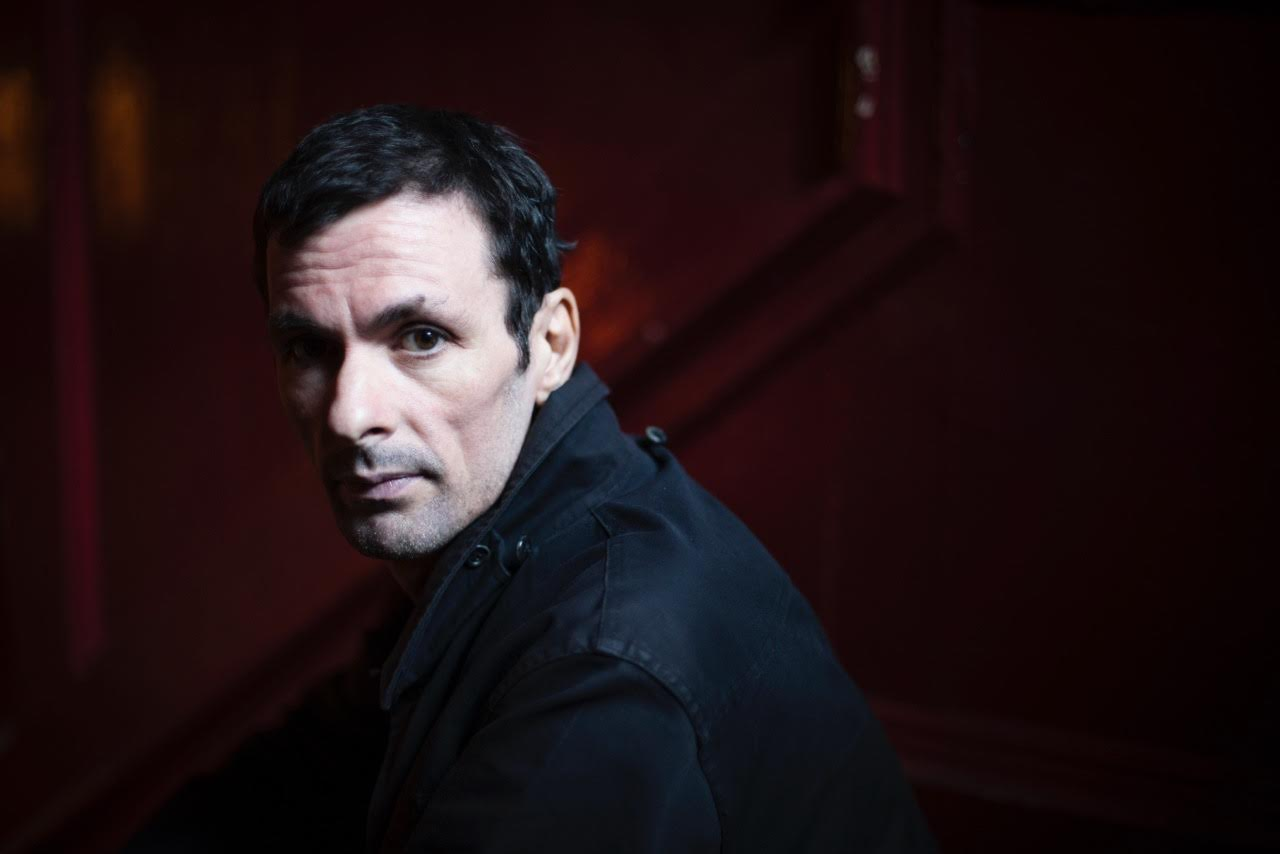

Background information
- Born: 1969 (age 56–57)
- Origin: London
- Genres: Ambient; Experimental; Film score
- Occupations: Musician; Film Composer; Curator
- Years active: 1990–present
- Labels: SN Variations; Village Green; Vertical Form; Constructive; Silva Screen
- Website: www.adriancorker.com

Adrian Corker is a British Musician based in London. Originally from Sheffield, he began releasing music working with Paul Conboy after meeting in Manchester in 1990. He also co-runs two labels and is a film score composer. He is currently published by Faber Music.

== Film and television work ==
Corker and Conboy started writing film music for director Antonia Bird after she heard their music in 1997 and they wrote the music for a number of films and TV dramas by her including Face, Care and The Hamburg Cell. They wrote the music for director and cinematographer Florian Hoffmeister's Three Degrees Colder, which won the Silver Leopard for best first feature at the Locarno Film Festival. A soundtrack was released in 2006 performed by the Nuremberg Symphony Orchestra.

On starting to work solo from 2010, Corker continued working with Antonia Bird up to her death in 2013. In 2011, he also wrote the music for the film Way of the Morris by Tim Plester. Between 2013 and 2014 he wrote the music for The Village starring Maxine Peake and John Simm. In 2016, he wrote the music to Florian Hoffmeister's The Have-Nots from a novel by Katharina Hacker.

In 2017, he wrote the music for Waiting for You, directed by Charles Garrad and starring Fanny Ardant and Colin Morgan. Towards the end of the same year, he started writing the music for Rowan Joffé's Tin Star. The music features musicians including Lucy Railton, Leo Abrahams, Serge Vuille and Sam Amidon (who Corker also worked with on The Village). He wrote for both of the next two seasons culminating in Tin Star Liverpool in 2020 on which he also worked with Chris Watson.

== Recorded Projects ==
Adrian Corker and Paul Conboy experimented with a couple of aliases before settling on Corker Conboy and released two albums and one EP which featured remixes by David Grubbs and Xela all on Vertical Form. As a solo artist In 2011 A soundtrack album to the documentary Way of the Morris was released on Jonny Trunks OST label. A first solo album Raise in 2013 on Village Green partly recorded in Iceland at Greenhouse Studios featuring musicians such as The Elysian Quartet, Helgi Jonsson, Jack Wyllie and Milo Fitzpatrick. A remix EP in 2014 StartMergeFade followed featured new material and remixes by Richard Skelton and Circle Traps.

This was also the first release on Corker's SN Variations label which has so far released four releases. The Scelsi Ep had work by and derived from the work of Giacinto Scelsi. Duo for Violin and Cello was performed by Aisha Orazbayeva and Lucy Railton, Invertebrate Harmonics by Chris Watson and Hon Shirabe a solo shakuhachi piece performed by Joe Browning and recorded by Chris Watson https://chriswatson.net/2016/03/27/scelsi-ep-limited-edition-vinyl-release/

In 2016 the soundtrack to the Have-Nots was released. The music consisted of violin, cello, viola da gamba, double bass and lock-grooves, and further music by Laurence Crane, John Cage, Aisha Orazbayeva and Lucy Railton. https://www.fluid-radio.co.uk/2016/12/adri an-corker-the-have-nots/

In 2017 Aisha Orazbayeva and Naomi Sato recorded Two4 by John Cage for violin and shō and released on SN Variations in a small edition with handmade calligraphy by Chris Bigg. In September 2017 a digital EP of 5 pieces from Tin Star was released.

At the end of 2017 he also released an eponymous improvised album on oscillators and saxophone with Jack Wyllie mastered by Stephan Mathieu.

In 2019 He released Music for Lock Grooves, featuring the violin of Aisha Orazbayeva and the percussion of Sam Wilson

In 2020 the OST of the music from Tin Star Liverpool was released as the first release on a new label Constructive co-founded by Corker. It was awarded No 2 OST of the year in Mojo Magazine.

in 2022 He release his first long form album in 9 years Since It Turned Out Something Else.featuring The Ligeti Quartet, Chris Watson, Tatsuhisa Yamamoto and Takuma Watanabe amongst others.

In 2023 he contributed a track Drawing a Circle to Step Out Again on a compilation Utopia or Oblivion in response to the work of polymath Buckminster Fuller. It also featured tracks from Ale Hop, Robert Lippok and Richard Skelton and Corey Fuller

In 2024, along with Paul Conboy, he re released Corker Conboy’s In Light of that Learn Later, a post rock project from the early 2000s. There were also remixes from US dub-techno band Purelink.

In 2025 a new project CxBxT with Tujiko Noriko and George Barton was announced. An album .After is out October 2025 with remixes and a film by Tujiko and Joji Koyama to follow.

== Other projects ==
In 2013–2014 he curated a series of shows at the Paul Stolper Gallery, The Silence Between, featuring sound artists Jem Finer, Rie Nakajima, Dawn Scarfe and Chris Watson.

https://frieze.com/article/chris-watson

In July 2015 he co-curated with Will Dutta MusICA Now Exploring Sound and Authorship at The iCA, an event of sound installation.performance and film by and inspired by Giacinto Scelsi.

In July 2017 he organised an event at the Gagosian Gallery with proceeds going to migrant charity Proem-Aid. Music was performed by Aisha Orazbayeva, Naomi Sato and Liam Byrne and the program had music by John Cage, Telemann, Gibbons and traditional Shō repertoire.

http://www.adriancorker.com/wp-content/uploads/2017/06/Concert-Poster-by-Chris-Bigg.pdf http://thequietus.com/articles/22758-john-cage-piece-reading-launch-london

In October 2018 he co-curated with Unsound in Krakow an installation based on the environmental issues facing Poland's Białowieza forest, the last primeval forest in Europe. The installation featured work by Peter Cusack and Martyna Pozńanka. http://thequietus.com/articles/23418-unsound-krakow-2017-mark-fisher-gas-wolfgang-voigt-review

In April 2022 he co-curated with 33 33 a concert at St John Smiths Square London featuring Kali Malone, Lucy Railton and Kit Downes and FUJ1IIIIIIIIIIITA.

Since 2022 he has been running SN Variations and Constructive, its sister lane which he co-founded. SN Variations has released music by Lucy Railton & Kit Downes Chris Watson,Oliver Leith, Aisha Orazbayeva and Jack Sheen Constructive has released soundtracks by Paul Davies and Tujiko Noriko, Corker himself, avant pop by Oï les Ox, as well as work from Takuma Watanabe and remixes from Jan Jelinek, Tashi Wada and Vladislav Delay. In 2023 software company Void and Vista () released a cinematic instrument Strands inspired by Corker’s work on Tin Star.

=== Studio albums ===
- Since It Turned Out Something Else (2022, SNVariations)
- Tin Star Liverpool OST (2020, Constructive)
- Music for Lock Grooves (2019, SN Variations)
- Tin Star OST (2019, Silva Screen)
- Adrian Corker/Jack Wyllie(2017, Chaoide)
- The Have-Nots OST (2017, SN Variations)
- Start Merge Fade (2014, SN Variations)
- Raise (2013, Village Green)
- Way of the Morris (2011, The OST Label)
- Three Degrees Colder (2006 Blue Eyes Music)
- Six For Five Ep (2005, Vertical Form)
- Radiant Idiot (2005, Vertical Form)
- In Light of That Learnt Later (2003, Vertical Form)
