= Martin Barrass =

English actor

- Born: Martin Ronald Barrass; 22 February 1956 (age 70); Kingston upon Hull, England
- Occupation: Actor
- Years active: 1979–present
- Television: Emmerdale, Angels Radio The Archers
- Height: 1.64 m (5 ft 5 in)
- Spouse: Vicky Carter
- Children: 2

Martin Barrass is an English film, television and theatre actor as well as being a DJ on local radio. He is best known for his role as Ron Frost in the television series Angels, Mike Conrad in Emmerdale and for appearing alongside Berwick Kaler in the annual York Theatre Royal Pantomime every year from 1984 onwards.

== Career ==
Martin studied at the Webber Douglas Academy of Dramatic Art with Gary Oldman. Martin first appeared in Angels, a BBC drama based around nurses in a London Hospital. He also played Mike, a close friend of Jackie Merrick and Archie Brooks in Emmerdale Farm. In 1982, he appeared in an award-winning Channel 4 film, Remembrance, alongside Gary Oldman, John Altman and Timothy Spall.

In 2014 Martin started doing a lunchtime time slot of BBC Radio York. The show is a mix of music, comedy and interviews.

=== Theatre ===
Besides acting in serious and non-York based roles, Barrass is famous for being the sidekick of Berwick Kaler in the Pantomimes performed at York's Theatre Royal since 1985. Barrass also takes part in productions run by the Hull Truck Theatre Company.

Barrass was Richard Bean's first choice to play the role of Alfie in the Royal National Theatre's production of One Man, Two Guvnors. Barrass was initially unable to accept the part due to other theatre commitments; however, he eventually played Alfie at the Theatre Royal Haymarket when the original cast transferred to Broadway.

== Personal life ==
Barrass was born in Kingston upon Hull, but now lives and works mainly in York.

In September 2016, Barrass was involved in a motorbike collision near to Skipton in North Yorkshire. He was airlifted to Leeds General Infirmary where he was kept in a medically induced coma for several days. It was later revealed that Barrass had suffered 17 fractured ribs, a "mashed" liver, a broken ankle and his heart had stopped for five minutes. Barrass intends to return to the stage in February 2017 as part of Hull's City of Culture year.

== Filmography ==
Year	Title	Role	Notes
1979 - 1981	Angels	Ron Frost	
1982	Remembrance		Channel 4 film
1983 - 1985	Emmerdale Farm	Mike Conrad	
1995	Heartbeat	Sapper Smith	Episode - Unfinished Business
2001	The Bill	Georgie Pye	Episode - For Better or Worse
2016	The Railway Children	Mr Perks National Railway Museum in York 2011.	Stage version filmed live at York Theatre Royal
