= To the Lighthouse =

1927 novel by Virginia Woolf

- First edition
- Author: Virginia Woolf
- Cover artist: Vanessa Bell
- Language: English
- Genre: Modernism
- Publisher: Hogarth Press
- Publication date: 5 May 1927
- Publication place: United Kingdom
- Preceded by: Mrs Dalloway
- Followed by: Orlando: A Biography
- Text: To the Lighthouse at Wikisource

To the Lighthouse is a 1927 novel by Virginia Woolf. The novel centres on the Ramsay family and their visits to the Isle of Skye in Scotland between 1910 and 1920.

Following and extending the tradition of modernist novelists like Marcel Proust and James Joyce, the plot of To the Lighthouse is secondary to its philosophical introspection. Cited as a key example of the literary technique of multiple focalisation, the novel includes little dialogue and almost no direct action; most of it is written as thoughts and observations. To the Lighthouse is made of three powerfully charged visions into the life of the Ramsay family—maternal Mrs. Ramsay, highbrow Mr. Ramsay, and their eight children—who live in a summer house off the rocky coast of Scotland. From Mr. Ramsay's seemingly trivial postponement of a visit to a nearby lighthouse, Virginia Woolf examines tensions and allegiances and shows that the small joys and quiet tragedies of everyday life could go on forever. The novel recalls childhood emotions and highlights adult relationships. Among the book's many tropes and themes are those of loss, subjectivity, the nature of art, and the problem of perception.

In 1998, the Modern Library named To the Lighthouse No. 15 on its list of the 100 best English-language novels of the 20th century. In 2005, the novel was included on Time magazine's list of the one hundred best English-language novels since 1923.

== Plot summary ==
=== Part I: The Window ===
The novel is set in the Ramsays' summer home in the Hebrides, on the Isle of Skye. The section begins with Mrs Ramsay assuring her 6-year-old son James they should be able to visit the lighthouse the next day. This prediction is countered by Mr Ramsay, who voices his certainty the weather will not be clear. This opinion forces a certain tension between Mr and Mrs Ramsay, and also between Mr Ramsay and James. This particular incident is referred to on various occasions throughout the section, especially in the context of Mr and Mrs Ramsay's relationship.

The Ramsays and their eight children are joined at the house by several friends and colleagues. One of these friends, Lily Briscoe, begins the novel as a young, uncertain painter attempting a portrait of Mrs Ramsay and James. Briscoe finds herself plagued by doubts throughout the novel, largely fed by the claims of Charles Tansley, another guest, who asserts women can neither paint nor write. Tansley himself is an admirer of Mr Ramsay, a philosophy professor, and of Ramsay's academic treatises.

The section closes with a large dinner party. When Augustus Carmichael, a visiting poet, asks for a second serving of soup, Mr Ramsay nearly snaps at him. Mrs Ramsay is out of sorts when Paul Rayley and Minta Doyle, two acquaintances she has brought together in engagement, arrive late to dinner, as Minta has lost her grandmother's brooch on the beach.

=== Part II: Time Passes ===
Ten years passed before the Ramsays visited their summer home again. The First World War has begun and ended, and Mrs Ramsay has died, as have two of her children – Prue died from complications of childbirth, and Andrew was killed in the war. Mr Ramsay has been left adrift without his wife to praise and comfort him during his bouts of fear and anguish over the longevity of his philosophical work.

This section is told primarily from an omniscient point of view, with interjections from Mrs McNab. Mrs McNab has worked for the Ramsays since before the story began, and her narrative illustrates how the family has changed while the summer home remained empty for years.

=== Part III: The Lighthouse ===
In this final section, some of the remaining Ramsays and other guests return to their summer home ten years after the events of Part I. Mr Ramsay plans to make the long-delayed visit to the lighthouse with his daughter Cam(illa) and his son James (his other four surviving children are virtually unmentioned in the final section). The visit almost does not happen, as Cam and James are not ready, but they eventually set off. As they travel the children are silent in protest at their father for forcing them to come along. However, James keeps the sailing boat steady, and rather than receiving the harsh words he has come to expect from his father, he hears praise, providing a rare moment of empathy between father and son. Cam's attitude towards her father changes from resentment to eventual admiration.

They are accompanied by the sailor Macalister and his son, who catches fish during the journey.

While they set sail for the lighthouse, Lily attempts to complete the painting she has held in her mind since the start of the novel. She reconsiders her memories of Mrs and Mr Ramsay, balancing the multitude of impressions from ten years ago in an effort to reach the objective truth about Mrs Ramsay and about life itself. Upon finishing the painting just as the sailing party reaches the lighthouse, and seeing that it satisfies her, she realises that the execution of her vision is more important to her than the idea of leaving some sort of legacy.

== Major themes ==
=== The passage of time ===
One theme often pondered and expressed as a main theme in To the Lighthouse is the passage of time and memory as it correlates to everyday life, and then the 'big picture'. As Ramsay's time at the Isle of Skye represents a pause in time away from their ordinary motions of life, Woolf uses her complex characters to reflect on the movement of time. The character of Mrs. Ramsay in particular is very aware of how fast time moves, and works to slow down time by preserving her children's youth, and keeping the family in a protective bubble. In 'Time Passes', the second section of the novel, the family is now left with the loss and absence of Mrs. Ramsay after her death. The rest of the novel is then reflective of how the vacation house and its memories within it act as a portal keeping life from moving forward. The artist Lily can't find inspiration to paint with the absence of Mrs. Ramsay, as Ramsay had said "life stands still here", and there is no inspiration in a stuck moment in time – only reflection. Getting to the lighthouse for the rest of the Ramsay family explores an instance of recovery for the family as they move forward.

=== A Victorian gendered analysis ===
As the character of Mr. Ramsay compares his own complexity of self to that of a piano or the arrangement of the alphabet, Woolf is giving her audience an insight into the nature of how the man, or in this case how Woolf perceives the intellectual head of the Victorian household, is seen within his own mind. Woolf uses this character trait of a man like Mr. Ramsay to show the inner-workings of a family dynamic, with the man being the outwardly respected figure, while being the inwardly resented character (primarily by his children and himself). Mrs. Ramsay in this dynamic is the maternal and perfect figure the family relies on. The children need her protection from the truth of the world, and her husband needs her nurturement to succeed and boost his ego. As a picture of the Victorian era ideology, Mr. and Mrs. Ramsay act as the blueprint. With the addition of young character Lily Briscoe presenting the then new age ‘modern woman’, Mr. Ramsay is left with a unsatisfied lack of validation after their conversation on the beach in Part III. Instead of performing the task of encouraging and uplifting Mr. Ramsay – as expected of the Victorian woman – Lily turns a blind eye to Mr. Ramsay’s search for sympathy. Woolf often is seen exploring the binary between both man and woman, and generational gendered differences in her novels.

=== Complexity of experience ===
Large parts of Woolf's novel do not concern themselves with the objects of vision, but rather investigate the means of perception, attempting to understand people in the act of looking. To be able to understand thought, Woolf's diaries reveal, that the author would spend considerable time listening to herself think, observing how and which words and emotions arose in her mind in response to what she saw.

=== Complexity of human relationships ===
This examination of perception is not, however, limited to isolated inner dialogues, but also analysed in the context of human relationships and the tumultuous emotional spaces crossed to truly reach another human being. Two sections of the book stand out as excellent snapshots of fumbling attempts at this crossing: the silent interchange between Mr. and Mrs. Ramsay as they pass the time alone together at the end of section 1, and Lily Briscoe's struggle to fulfill Mr. Ramsay's desire for sympathy (and attention) as the novel closes.

== Narration and perspective ==
The novel maintains an unusual form of omniscient narrator; the plot unfolds through shifting perspectives of each character's consciousness. Shifts can occur even mid-sentence, and in some sense, they resemble the rotating beam of the lighthouse itself. Unlike James Joyce's stream of consciousness technique, however, Woolf does not tend to use abrupt fragments to represent characters' thought processes; her method is more one of lyrical paraphrases. The unique presentation of omniscient narration means that, throughout the novel, readers are challenged to formulate their own understanding, and views, from the subtle shifts in character development, as much of the story is presented in ambiguous, or even contradictory, descriptions.

Whereas in Part I, the novel is concerned with illustrating the relationship between the character's experiences and the actual experience and surroundings, part II, 'Time Passes', having no characters to relate to, presents events differently. Instead, Woolf wrote the section from the perspective of a displaced narrator, unrelated to any people, intending that events be seen in relation to time. For that reason the narrating voice is unfocused and distorted, providing an example of what Woolf called 'life as it is when we have no part in it.' Major events like deaths of Mrs Ramsay, Prue, Andrew are related parenthetically, which makes the narration a kind of journal entry. It is also possible that the house itself is the inanimate narrator of these events.

== Novel's autobiographical background ==
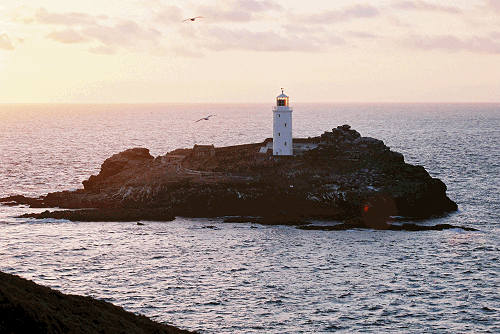
Godrevy Lighthouse at sunset

Woolf began writing To the Lighthouse partly as a way of understanding and dealing with unresolved issues concerning both her parents and indeed there are many similarities between the plot and her own life. Her visits with her parents and family to St Ives, Cornwall, where her father rented a house, were perhaps the happiest times of Woolf's life, but when she was thirteen her mother died and, like Mr. Ramsay, her father Leslie Stephen plunged into gloom and self-pity. Woolf's sister Vanessa Bell wrote that reading the sections of the novel that describe Mrs. Ramsay was like seeing her mother raised from the dead. Their brother Adrian was not allowed to go on an expedition to Godrevy Lighthouse, just as in the novel James looks forward to visiting the lighthouse and is disappointed when the trip is cancelled. Lily Briscoe's meditations on painting are a way for Woolf to explore her own creative process (and also that of her painter sister), since Woolf thought of writing in the same way that Lily thought of painting.

Woolf's father began renting Talland House in St. Ives, in 1882, shortly after Woolf's birth. The house was used by the family as a family retreat during the summer for the next ten years. The location of the main story in To the Lighthouse, the house on the Hebridean island, was formed by Woolf in imitation of Talland House. Many actual features from St Ives Bay are carried into the story, including the gardens leading down to the sea, the sea itself, and the lighthouse.

Although in the novel the Ramsays return to the house on Skye after the war, the Stephens had given up Talland House by that time. After the war, Virginia Woolf visited Talland House under its new ownership with her sister Vanessa, and Woolf repeated the journey later, long after her parents were dead.

== Original publication ==
Adorned with a dust cover designed by Vanessa Bell – Virginia Woolf’s sister – the original copy of ‘To the Lighthouse’ was published in May, 1927 through Hogarth Press, which was independently owned by Virginia and Leonard Woolf. With light blue cloth and gold lettering, the original edition was printed in 3000 copies by Hogarth Press. Through the American publishing group – Harcourt Brace, & Co. – the novel was released with “Pale green cloth boards; lettered in blue on spine.” This edition released the same month had 4000 copies printed for distribution. With the early success of this novel, it prompted Woolf to purchase a car and later led to her 1928 win of the Prix Femina–Vie Heureuse prize.

== Adaptations ==
- To the Lighthouse, a 1983 telefilm starring Rosemary Harris, Michael Gough, Suzanne Bertish, and Kenneth Branagh.
- To the Lighthouse, a 2000 audio drama for BBC Radio 4, adapted by Eileen Atkins and featuring Vanessa Redgrave, Edward Petherbridge, and Juliet Stevenson.
- To the Lighthouse, a 15-minute Drama, BBC Radio 4 11 August 2014 – 15 August 2014 dramatised by Linda Marshall Griffiths
- To the Lighthouse, a 2017 opera composed by Zesses Seglias to an English libretto by Ernst Marianne Binder. Premiered at the Bregenz Festival.
- To the Lighthouse, a 2020 short opera composed by Lucie Treacher for Scottish Opera.

== Bibliography ==
- Virginia Woolf, To the Lighthouse, (London: Hogarth, 1927) First edition; 3000 copies initially with a second impression in June.
- Virginia Woolf, To the Lighthouse, (New York: Harcourt Brace, 1927) First US edition; 4000 copies initially with at least five reprints in the same year.
- Virginia Woolf, To the Lighthouse (Wordsworth Classics, 1994), with introduction and notes by Nicola Bradbury, ISBN 978-1853260919
