= The Judas Kiss (play) =

1998 play by David Hare

- Cover of the published play (1998)
- Written by: David Hare
- Characters: Oscar Wilde; Lord Alfred "Bosie" Douglas; Robert "Robbie" Ross
- Subject: Oscar Wilde's decline at the hands of his lover Bosie
- Genre: Biographical drama
- Setting: London; Naples

Premiere
- Date: 12 March 1998
- Place: Playhouse Theatre

The Judas Kiss is a 1998 British play by David Hare about Oscar Wilde's scandal and disgrace at the hands of his young lover Bosie (Lord Alfred Douglas).

== Plot ==
Act 1: London, 1895

Oscar Wilde's spoiled and impetuous young lover Bosie has succeeded in instigating Wilde to sue Bosie's father in court for insulting him as a "sodomite". The loss of the suit opens the way for Wilde being criminally indicted for gross indecency. Wilde has tacit government permission to flee the country to avoid arrest, trial, and imprisonment, but the childish Bosie insists that he stay and defend their honour.

Act 2: Italy, 1897

Wilde is doing the one thing his friends wanted him to avoid, namely reuniting with the unbelievably selfish Bosie after his difficult two-year incarceration. Wilde, a broken man, is holed up in exile from the UK in a rat-infested hotel in Naples.

== Characters ==
=== Historical figures ===
- Oscar Wilde
- Lord Alfred "Bosie" Douglas
- Robert "Robbie" Ross

=== Fictitious characters ===
- Sandy Moffatt, a hotel manager who is implied to be a homosexual (Note: The dialogue suggests that Moffatt has a fancy for a male member of his staff, and this is the way that most actors portraying the character approach it.)
- Arthur Wellesley, a member of the hotel staff
- Phoebe Cane, a recently hired maid and love interest of Arthur Wellesley
- Galileo Masconi, an Italian fisherman with whom Bosie has an affair

== Cast ==
=== Original 1998 cast ===
- Oscar Wilde – Liam Neeson
- Bosie Douglas – Tom Hollander
- Robbie Ross – Peter Capaldi
- Sandy Moffatt – Richard Clarke
- Arthur Wellesley – Alex Walkinshaw
- Phoebe Cane – Stina Nielsen
- Galileo Masconi – Daniel Serafini-Sauli

=== 2012 revival cast ===
- Oscar Wilde – Rupert Everett
- Bosie Douglas – Freddie Fox
- Robbie Ross – Cal MacAninch
- Sandy Moffatt – Alister Cameron
- Arthur Wellesley – Ben Hardy
- Phoebe Cane – Kirsty Oswald
- Galileo Masconi – Tom Colley

== London and Broadway productions ==
=== Original 1998 production ===
The play was originally produced by the Almeida Theatre Company and premiered in London's Playhouse Theatre in the West End, where it ran from 12 March to 18 April 1998. It then transferred to Broadway in New York at the Broadhurst Theatre, where it ran from 23 April through 1 August 1998. The play was rushed into production in London in order to open on Broadway in time for the Tonys. The run starred Liam Neeson as Wilde and Tom Hollander as Bosie, and was directed by Richard Eyre.

=== 2012 revival ===
The Judas Kiss was revived at London's Hampstead Theatre beginning 6 September 2012, starring Rupert Everett as Wilde and Freddie Fox as Bosie, and directed by Neil Armfield. The play ran at the Hampstead through 13 October 2012, toured the UK and Dublin, and then transferred to the West End at the Duke of York's Theatre on 9 January 2013 in a limited run through 6 April 2013.

Everett won the WhatsOnStage Award for Best Actor in a Play, and was nominated for the Olivier Award for Best Actor. In 2016 the production, still starring Everett and with Charlie Rowe as Bosie, ran in North America for seven weeks in Toronto and five weeks at BAM in New York City.

== Australian productions ==
The play had its Australian premiere in 1999 at Sydney's Belvoir St Theatre. It was directed by Neil Armfield, who later directed the 2012 London revival, and featured Bille Brown in the role of Oscar Wilde. In 2014, a new production directed by Jason Cavanagh and produced by the Mockingbird Theatre Company was staged at Theatreworks in the Melbourne suburb of St Kilda, featuring Chris Baldock as Wilde and Nigel Langley as Bosie.

== Reception ==
The initial 1998 run of The Judas Kiss proved popular with audiences but less so with critics. The 2012 London revival however was both critically and popularly acclaimed. Michael Billington in The Guardian observed of the revival:

When David Hare's play was first seen in 1998, it suffered from the miscasting of the central roles of Oscar Wilde and Lord Alfred Douglas (Bosie). Now, in Neil Armfield's fine revival, it looks a much richer play .... The Wilde that emerges is a multifaceted character: one who can either be admired for his uncompromising moral integrity, or pitied for his wilful capacity for self-destruction. This is the most convincing dramatic portrait of Wilde that I have come across – one that captures him as both romantic individualist and tragic victim.

Other critics concurred with Billington's sentiment; Fiona Mountford in the Evening Standard echoed that "Time has been kinder to The Judas Kiss (1998) than some initial judgments: on second viewing it's revealed as a rich, resonant piece of writing, which at last boasts the ideal cast."
