= Computer Graphic =

1993 British television advertisement

- Agency: HHCL
- Client: Golden Wonder
- Language: English
- Running time: 40 seconds
- Product: Pot Noodle
- Release date: February 1993
- Directed by: Mischa Alexander
- Music by: Motörhead ("Ace of Spades")
- Starring: Phil Hartman
- Country: United Kingdom

Computer Graphic is a 1993 British television advertisement for Golden Wonder's Pot Noodle snack product. It was the first commercial created for the product by the agency HHCL, who worked with the brand for over twelve years. It stars Saturday Night Live host Phil Hartman as a newscaster for the fictitious Pot TV, who, after deciding that eating the 'intense' snack requires a 'intense' film, is shown alongside a computer-generated, psychedelic assemblage of flashing images and visuals, inspired by rave culture and the 1989 film Eurotechno.

After the advertisement's debut in February 1993, the Independent Television Commission (ITC) received 29 complaints about its use of strobing visuals, and after three reports of epileptic fits being triggered by it, Computer Graphic was banned by the ITC until HHCL edited a less intense version for further transmission. The ban inspired the commission to implement guidelines on preventing seizures, drawn up with Professor Graham Harding.

Considered innovative, the advertisement inspired a popular wave of 'trippy' advertisements that appeared to reflect the effects of mind-altering drugs, as well as the experimental use of flash images in British advertising. The soundtrack music – Motörhead's "Ace of Spades" – was re-released as a single and peaked on the UK Singles Chart at number 23. Phil Hartman appeared in further 'Pot TV' adverts for Pot Noodle.

== Synopsis ==
According to HHCL director Mischa Alexander, Computer Graphic takes on the form of a "hypnotic" broadcast from the parody news station Pot TV, with 'Pot' coming from the name of the product rather than the slang term for marijuana. It stars Phil Hartman as a manic, 1950s-style American newscaster, described by one writer as "apparently lobotomised", who, before tasting the Golden Wonder Pot Noodle, announces that eating the "intense snack" is best accompanied by an "intense film". This is followed by a surreal, computer-animated sequence of flashing, strobing psychedelic graphics, appearing behind the newscaster, accompanied by the heavy metal soundtrack of Motörhead's "Ace of Spades". The visuals have been described as "computer-generated psychedelia" and "a hi-tech backdrop [of] flashing images". The advertisement ends as the newscaster says, "If this isn't snacking at its most intense, the devil don't scuba dive."

== Production and broadcast ==
Computer Graphic was created by the advertising agency HHCL, known at the time for their striking commercials for Tango, R. Whites and Danepak, for Golden Wonder's Pot Noodle snack product. The agency's creative understudies, known as "Mr Robinson and Mr Young", were also involved in the creation. According to Rhys Williams of The Independent, the advertisement was an attempt to adapt to how rave culture had forced advertising agencies to "rethink the way they sell to young people", with agency research declaring that young people in the early 1990s had become "less materialistic, more creative and more media-literate" than in the late 1980s. Andrew Harrison of Select described this vogue in advertising as one that "[nods] to rave culture, without being too slavish to the form", with acknowledgement that since the emergence of Madchester in 1987, rave culture had a greater impact on "more under-25s than all the previous youth cultus put together."

The advertisement's visuals were based on the experimental film Eurotechno (1989), created by visual artists Stakker. Eurtechno was among the earliest visual projects to emerge from the British electronic music scene, and according to Andy Beta of Pitchfork, was an "eye-candy standard for early raves and acid culture happenings" until being "co-opted" into the epileptic-inducing Pot Noodle advert. HHCL's decision to hire actor Phil Hartman, known as the host of Saturday Night Live, lent the advertisement "extra cred." Comparisons have been drawn between Pot Noodle's campaign and the postmodern aesthetic of U2's Zoo TV Tour, the "intense" rapidity of content and gags in The Big Breakfast (albeit "without the Motorhead soundtrack"), and the "zany graphics" and "weird slogans" of Channel 4's 'Tribe Time' youth culture show Close Personal Friend (1995).

Computer Graphic debuted on British television in February 1993. Before the advertisement's transmission, TV weekly predicted it would attract controversy and the ire of campaigner Mary Whitehouse, but Mischa dismissed fears that the advert's flashing images could induce fits, saying: "We changed the picture a lot and did not use a dangerous frequency." Regarding their use of "flashing graphics and intense visuals" and testing the standards of broadcasting, HHCL & Partners creative director Steve Henry commented that they and other agencies "are all just trying new ways to get through to people, because [viewers] tend to have in-built defences against advertising. It's just an advertising game to entertain and stimulate and engage them. It's not a sinister thing."

== Epilepsy controversy and ban ==
By March 1993, the Independent Television Commission (ITC) received 29 complaints about the advertisement's intense use of flashing visuals triggering convulsions among epileptics, 28 of them mentioning epilepsy and five making mention of viewers "suffering fits or the beginning of symptoms." Specifically, by April, the advertisement had caused three viewers to suffer epileptic fits, causing the ITC to ban it until the "dangerous flashing sequences" were removed. It was only when the three fits were reported, as evidence of actual harm being caused, that the ITC suspended the advertisement, although The Guardian later cited sources that claimed the ITC were more concerned about "the 'subliminal' messages about 'pot' than the visuals". The advert had already finished its three-week run before the ITC's intervention, but HHCL planned to use it again in the future with "minor revisions", saying: "We went to extraordinary lengths to make sure this kind of thing did not happen. However, epilepsy can be triggered by something as simple as changing channels or a flickering TV set."

The ITC received consultation from Professor Graham Harding, a member of the British Epilepsy Association, who already believed the commercial "had a high potential for provoking fits" before any incidents were reported. HHCL co-operated with the ITC and Harding in editing the advertisement for further broadcast. The ITC released their report on the complaints in April, saying it "triggered epileptic fits", although HHCL's recut occurred weeks earlier when the problem first arose. Harding drew up the ITC's future guidelines on preventing seizures, which stated that "light levels in an advertisement should not be changed more than three times a second", adding that the stimulus from flashing light was the central issue caused by advertising. The Guardian write that, as per section 7 of the ITC code, "images of very brief duration" are outlawed to prevent photosensitive epilepsy, adding that the banned Pot Noodle commercial inspired the introduction of these regulations.

The Observer, who deemed it one of April's biggest news stories, commented on the rarity of an advert "being judged injurious to health", naming it one of several controversial advertisements of the time, including a Vauxhall commercial starring supermodels and Claire Rayner's role in a Vespre sanitary protection ad. The Guardian compared it to the news of Nintendo increasing the use of epilepsy cautions on its video games following claims that sufferers may react badly to "prolonged exposure to the flashing screens." By the end of 1993, the newspaper reported that the withdrawn Pot Noodle advert and Nintendo's warnings were among a number of scares that "characterised the technological year". According to the BBC, the fits caused by the banned Pot Noodle advert were one of two incidents in the 1990s that "intensified research into the way television triggers photosensitive epilepsy", the other being the 1997 Japanese broadcast of the Pokémon episode "Dennō Senshi Porygon". In October 1996, a commercial for the Ford Probe sportscar was withdrawn after reports it gave a woman a near-fatal epileptic seizure, inspiring comparison to Pot Noodle's ad in the press.

== Legacy ==
In April 1993, Williams described Pot Noodle's Computer Graphic as one of several youth-oriented commercials performing well at the time, alongside examples for Tango and Embassy Regal's "Reg" campaign. Alex Brownsell of Campaign's contemporary research concluded that the "Pot TV intense snacking" advertising was popular with teenagers. Despite saying he watches little television, Apache Indian praised Pot Noodle's "wacky" adverts in a November 1993 interview with The Daily Telegraph, saying they "really make me laugh." In 2005, Peter York of The Independent commented that Computer Graphic "looked utterly different" to other television commercials of the era, and – highlighting it as HHCL's first advertisement for Pot Noodle – praised it for beginning "12 years of marvellous, funny advertising that's defined the brand", adding that it established the brief to "amuse in a contemporary away" and acknowledge that the product itself is one "people liked but didn't respect".

Writing in 2009, Brownsell said the campaign "represented a new dawn in advertising. Startlingly honest, wilfully silly and capitalising on the zeitgeist of youth (then termed rave culture), this set the tone for many HHCL campaigns, but especially Pot Noodle's own subsequent ads." Pot Noodle would continue to employ HHCL for many years, including for further 'Pot TV' advertisements starring Hartman, including 1994's Randy, by which point the ongoing theme of 'illicit fun' was established in the brand's marketing. In Randy, Hartman appeared in a woolly hat and string vest alongside his excited terrier Randy, discussing "Pots of the World" and telling viewers to "experiment with something more exotic, like Randy and I do."

=== Influence ===
In 1996, Alix Sharkey of The Independent wrote that the "ground-breaking" advertisement, with its strobing psychedelic imagery, marked the first time "blatantly trippy visuals" were employed in contemporary advertising, ahead of mid-1990s adverts for Smirnoff and Kellogg's Fruit 'n Fibre that saw such imagery become popular. Sharkey described these as "a line of commercials whose imagery appears to draw on the effects of mind-altering substances", with Ben Lewis of Channel 4's Wired World similarly opining that they represent a growing trend in television commercials that explore "states of mind more readily associated with LSD or Ecstasy". Rupert Howell of HHCL described the Fruit 'n Fibre advert as "merely continuing [in the] tradition" of the Pot Noodle advert.

Writing in 2000, Belinda Archer of The Guardian believed the controversial advert was the first in the UK to experiment with "the use of flash frames and blipverts", ahead of First Direct's adverts featuring "a series of short frames" evocative of the flash images in The Young Ones, or a Mazda advert that required viewers to turn the volume up to hear a quiet message "and play it back to make sense of it". Archer comments that despite the laws on subliminal advertising, agencies repeatedly attempt to "experiment with the notion of subliminal communication", likening Computer Graphic to other examples including French Connection's controversial 1999 poster thar arranged the words "subliminal", "advertising" and "experiment" in a fashion that the word "sex" was spelt out.

=== Use of "Ace of Spades" ===
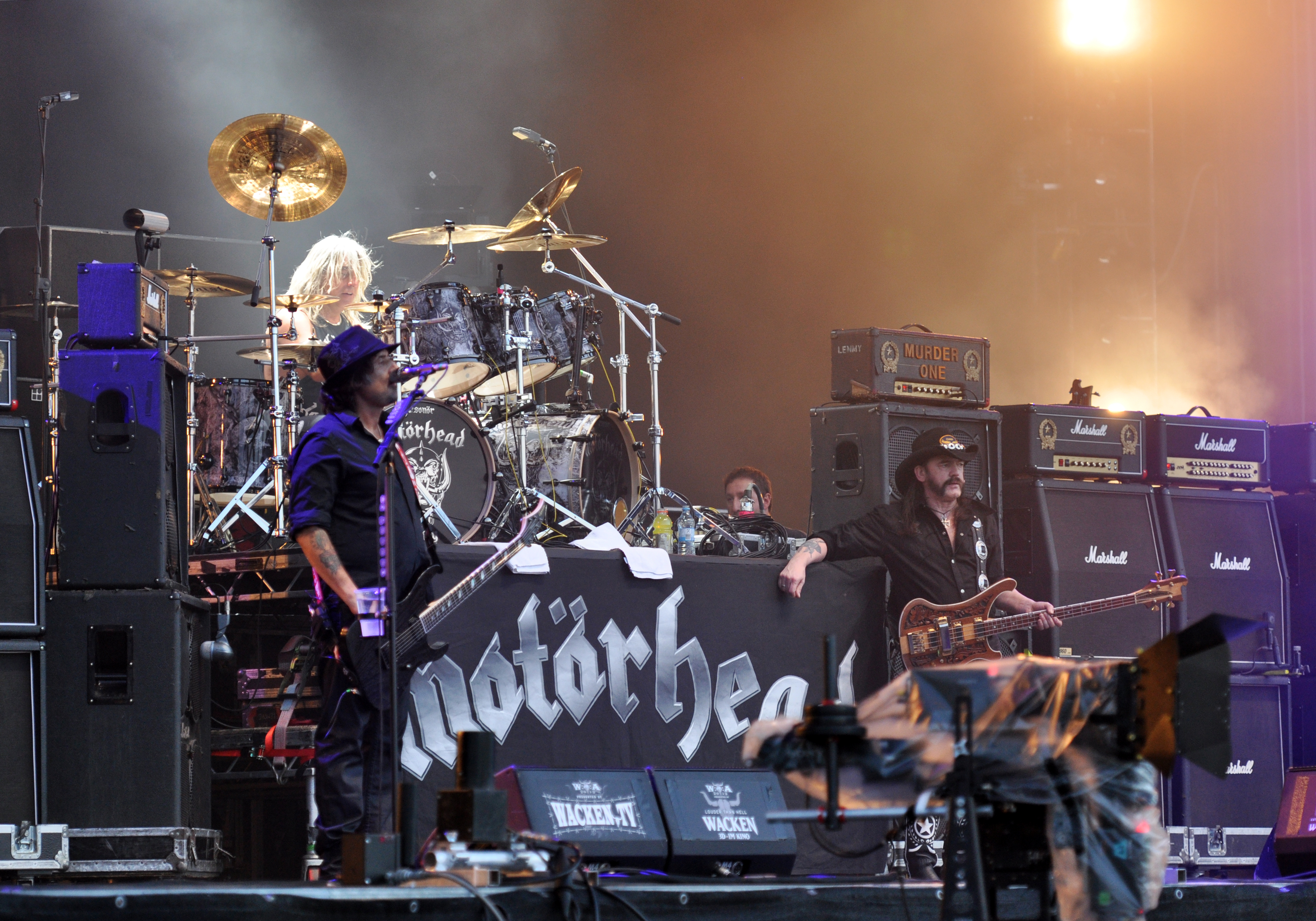
Motörhead (pictured 2013)

Following its appearance on the advert, Motörhead's "Ace of Spades" was re-released as a single with a remix, reaching number 23 on the UK Singles Chart in September 1993. According to Laughing Squid, the song later appeared in adverts for IKEA and Kronenbourg 1664. Based on its appearance in the Pot Noodle and IKEA soundtracks, the song was included on the compilation Commercial Break: Songs From T.V. Adverts (2002). Asked in 2006 by Sylvie Simmons of Mojo where he had involvement with the song being used by Pot Noodle, Motörhead singer Lemmy replied: "No. It's like Tony Hawk used it in one of his video games [Pro Skater 3] – you would think we would get royalties from it but we didn't."

Neil Perry of The Guardian mused in 2006 that, in contrast to the use of music by Joy Division in adverts for First Direct and Heineken, the use of "Ace of Spades" in the Pot Noodle Computer Graphic advertisement "hasn't made me think any less of Lemmy, or the song (although it never had the intended effect of making me eat a Pot Noodle)." Laura Snapes, also of The Guardian, posited that Motörhead allowing their song to be used in the commercial was an example of "orthodoxy inevitably [inspiring] contrarianism", likening it to Lou Reed appearing unapologetically in a Honda commercial or alternative groups like Sonic Youth signing to major labels. Discussing the demonstration of "dual-axe" guitar solos in advertising, NME opine that the Motörhead–Pot Noodle campaign "came close" to equalling Iron Maiden and Daley Thompson's appearance on a 1985 Lucozade advert.

== See also ==
- Harding test
- 1993 in British television
- Brylcreem (subject of a similar controversy)
- Orange Man (advertisement)
- St George (advertisement)
