= Creative Circle =

The Creative Circle (also known as The Advertising Creative Circle or The Advertising Creative Circle of Great Britain) is an educational awards body dedicated to creativity in British advertising, and the oldest advertising and marketing awards body in Europe. Their mission is to help promote creative excellence in advertising, while sharing knowledge and experience through educational programs and supporting young creative people. The annual Creative Circle awards are judged by the British advertising creative community. Their main offices are in Covent Garden, London.

== Origins ==
The Advertising Creative Circle of Great Britain was founded on 8 October 1945, at a luncheon at The Trocadero Hotel, London. The concept can be traced back to, H.F. Crowther (Director of Advertising Agency Rumble, Crowther & Nicholas) and G.R. Pope (Advertising Manager of The Times).

At the time, Crowther and Pope felt there was no other advertising organisation concerned exclusively with the craft of visualising, writing and designing advertising, and so decided to create an Advertising Creative Circle that could "not only provide a forum for such creative men, but [also] contribute to raising the status of advertising as a profession".

=== The First Council ===
| Title | Name | Position; Company |
|---|---|---|
| President | Mr. G. O. Nickalls | Director; Alfred Pemberton, Ltd |
| Vice-president | Mr H. F. Crowther | Director; Rumble, Crowther & Nicholas Ltd |
| Hon. secretary | Mr Ernest Briggs | Director; London Press Exchange Ltd |
| Hon. treasurer | Mr S. J. G. Chipperfield | Masius and Fergusson Ltd |
| Council member | Mr G. Butler | Art Director; J. Walter Thompson Co. Ltd |
| Council member | Mr G. H. Saxon Mills | Director; W. S. Crawford Ltd |
| Council member | Mr G. J. Redgrove | Director; C. Vernon and Sons Ltd |
| Council member | Mr G. Worledge | S. H. Benson Ltd |

This first council was responsible for determining subscriptions, membership control, copy vigilance, press relations and a programme of art exhibitions, publications and functions. In addition, they were tasked with selecting 10 more honorary members and a further 50 ordinary members, to be made up of noteworthy people wholly engaged in creative work – copywriters, copy chiefs, artists, art directors, layout men, visualisers and more.

Within its press relations functions, the Creative Circle hoped not only to keep the press informed about advertising matters generally, but also "take up the cudgels" whenever it was publicly attacked.

== Honours (awards) ==
The Creative Circle has been awarded the best of British advertising creativity since 1986. There are several levels of awards presented on the Honours Evening. From commendations, through to Bronze, Silver, and Gold, and ultimately, the Gold of Gold award for the single best piece of work that year. The President also presents a personal award to the person or organisation that has had the greatest impact on advertising that year.

=== List of President's Award winners ===
| Year | Winner |
|---|---|
| 1986 | John Gillard (Principal of The School of Communication Arts) |
| 1987 | Watford College (College) |
| 1988 | Central Office of Information (Client) |
| 1989 | Tony Cox (Creative) |
| 1990 | Tony Kaye (Director) |
| 1991 | Tim Delaney (Creative) |
| 1992 | Roger Woodburn (Director) |
| 1993 | Barbara Nokes (creative) |
| 1994 | Chris Palmer and Mark Denton (Creatives) |
| 1995 | --- |
| 1996 | Tom Carty and Walter Campbell (Creatives) |
| 1997 | Paul Weinburger (Creative) |
| 1998 | Richard Flintham and Andy Mcleod (Creatives) |
| 1999 | The men and women of the Creative Services Departments |
| 2000 | Paddy Easton and The Computer Film Company (Production Company) |
| 2001 | Dave Waters (Creative) |
| 2002 | Roger Kennedy (Typographer) |
| 2003 | Paul Silburn (Creative) |
| 2004 | Steve Henry (Creative) |
| 2005 | Daniel Kleinman (Director) |
| 2006 | --- |
| 2007 | Ed Morris (Creative) |
| 2008 | Juan Cabral (Creative) |
| 2009 | No Award Given |
| 2010 | Malcolm Gaskin (Creative) |
| 2011 | Graham Fink (Creative) |
| 2012 | Nick Gill (Creative) |
| 2013 | Matt Gooden & Ben Walker (Creatives) |

=== List of Gold of Gold Award winners ===
Established in 1989 as 'The Big One', and known from 1996 to 2011 as 'the Platinum Award', the currently named Gold of Golds is given to the single best advertising creative idea of the year (the only exception being 2008, when it was felt advertising agency Fallon deserved the award, having produced both the Cadbury Gorilla commercial and the Skoda Fabia Cake commercial in the same year ).

| Year | Winning Work | Client | Agency |
|---|---|---|---|
| 1989 (The Big One) | Relax | British Rail | Saatchi & Saatchi |
| 1990 (The Big One) | Into the Valley/Israelites | Maxell | Hutchins Film Company / Howell Henry Chaldecott Lury |
| 1991 (The Big One) | Club/Bar | Red Rock Cider | GGT |
| 1992 (The Big One) | Shoes In Action | Reebok | Lowe Howard Spink |
| 1993 (The Big One) | Reg on... | Regal, Imperial Tobacco | Lowe Howard Spink |
| 1994 (The Big One) | Unexpected | Dunlop | AMV BBDO / Tony Kaye Films |
| 1995 | --- | --- | --- |
| 1996 (Platinum Award) | Twister | Volvo | AMV BBDO |
| 1997 (Platinum Award) | St George | Blackcurrant Tango | HHCL & Partners |
| 1998 (Platinum Award) | Hiccups/Dentist/Chair/Guard/Tennis/Lamppost | Volkswagen UK | BMP DDB |
| 1999 | --- | --- | --- |
| 2000 | --- | --- | --- |
| 2001 (Platinum Award) | Bear | John West Salmon | Leo Burnett |
| 2002 (Platinum Award) | Sofa | Reebok | Lowe |
| 2003 (Platinum Award) | Ball Skills/Mum/Diving/Babies/Monsters | John Smiths | TBWA\London |
| 2004 (Platinum Award) | Cog | Honda | Partizan / Wieden + Kennedy |
| 2005 (Platinum Award) | Grrr | Honda | Wieden + Kennedy |
| 2006 (Platinum Award) | Balls | Sony | Fallon |
| 2007 (Platinum Award) | No Award Given | N/A | N/A |
| 2008 (Platinum Award) | Fallon | Fallon | Fallon |
| 2009 (Platinum Award) | Wallace & Gromit | Harvey Nichols | DDB |
| 2010 (Platinum Award) | Knife Crime | Metropolitan Police | AMV BBDO |
| 2011 (Platinum Award) | Straight/Catch | Magners | Red Brick Road |
| 2012 (Gold of Golds) | The Long Wait | John Lewis Partnership | Adam & Eve |
| 2013 (Gold of Golds) | Don't Cover It Up | Refuge | BBH London |

== Role Reversal Seminar ==
The Creative Circle Role Reversal Seminar was created in 1968 by Sam Rothenstein – a copywriter who believed that creative standards don't just depend on advertising agencies but on clients too.

The concept of the course is simple: one of the best ways to understand someone is to put yourself in their shoes. So, a group of middleweight marketers take on the role of an advertising agency creative department. While agency Creative Directors take on the role of the clients.

The marketers are grouped into "Agency" teams and made to pitch against each other for a piece of business (as happens in the real world). The "Agencies" are given a creative brief from a fictional client simultaneously. They then have 72 hours to conceive and produce a pitch-winning idea. This includes deciding upon a strategy and slogan, then creating and designing ad executions, across all media – they're then expected to film, edit, and present a television commercial in that time.

Each "Agency" is assisted by a professional Creative Director, to keep them on track, and an Art Director (known as a "Tutor" or a "Wrist") to help them turn their ideas into visuals and storyboards. A film crew and production team are also on hand to help with the filming and editing of the commercial.

After the 72 hours are up, the "Agency" teams pitch their ideas to the fictional clients – a consortium of real Creative Directors – who then select a winner.

The course is designed to give marketers the opportunity to see things from the point of view of their agency – learning through doing – which often gives them a completely new perspective on that relationship. It's also renowned throughout the industry for late nights and much drunken bonding, giving clients and agencies an insight into each other's worlds. It's even been known to influence real-world client/agency relationships, with one story speculating that many years ago, Guinness switched its multimillion-pound advertising account to J. Walter Thompson as a result of one such seminar.

The Role Reversal Seminar ran unbroken for precisely 40 years, always taking place in one of the UK's top universities – including Cambridge and St Andrew's – before settling for the last 20 years at Trinity College, Oxford. Over those 40 years, the course attracted thousands of marketers, but was closed in 2008 due to financial constraints.
