= Trevor Robinson =

Trevor Robinson may refer to:

- Trevor Robinson (footballer) (born 1984), professional footballer
- Trevor Robinson (advertising), creative director and founder of Quiet Storm, a British advertising agency
- Trevor Robinson (American football), American football player
