= Orange Man (advertisement) =

British TV ad

- Agency: HHCL
- Client: Britvic
- Language: English
- Running time: 40 seconds 30 seconds (edited version)
- Product: Tango Orange
- Release date: 1992
- Directed by: Matt Forrest
- Starring: Peter Geeves Ben Fox Ray Wilkins Hugh Dennis Gil Scott-Heron
- Production company: Limelight
- Country: United Kingdom
- Preceded by: Cleaning Windows
- Followed by: Oranges!

Orange Man is a British television advertisement for the soft drink Tango Orange. Created by advertising agency HHCL (Howell Henry Chaldecott Lury and Partners), a longtime collaborator of Tango, the advertisement was produced in 1991 and aired in 1992, and was the first in the brand's "You Know When You've Been Tango'd" campaign that would continue until 1996 before returning for several years in the 2000s.

The advertisement features an orange man slapping a Tango drinker across the cheeks as a metaphor for tasting Tango, and was intended as a reaction against the norm of "cause and effect" television advertising at the time, which was largely focused on scenarios where people's lives were improved by the product being advertised. Orange Man caused controversy after reports of injuries when children began copying the events of the advertisement in school playgrounds, and was subsequently withdrawn, with two other versions of Orange Man replacing it, both showing different scenarios aside from slapping.

Despite the controversy, it contributed to a boost of sales by more than a third, and has gained acclaim in later years, even featuring and ranking highly in several lists of the greatest advertisements ever made. A Channel 4/The Sunday Times poll in 2000 named Orange Man the third best advertisement of all time. It has also been credited as pioneering viral marketing and guerrilla marketing. Different commentators have named it the best advertisement for Tango and the best advertisement created by HHCL. Orange Man precedes other Tango advertisements that have caused controversy, and has been parodied several times.

== Plot ==
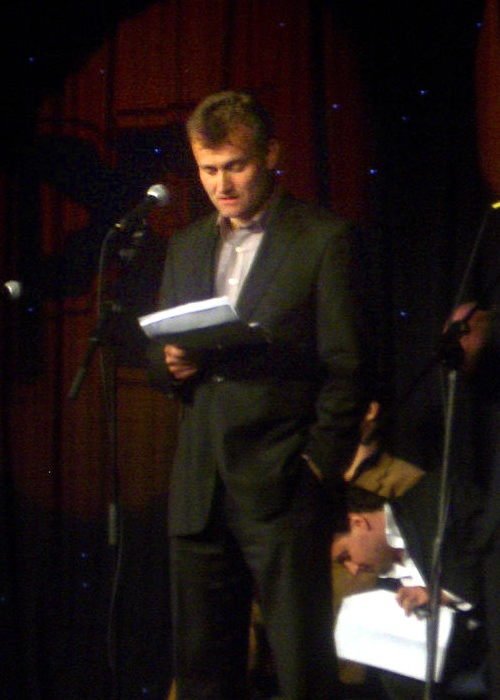
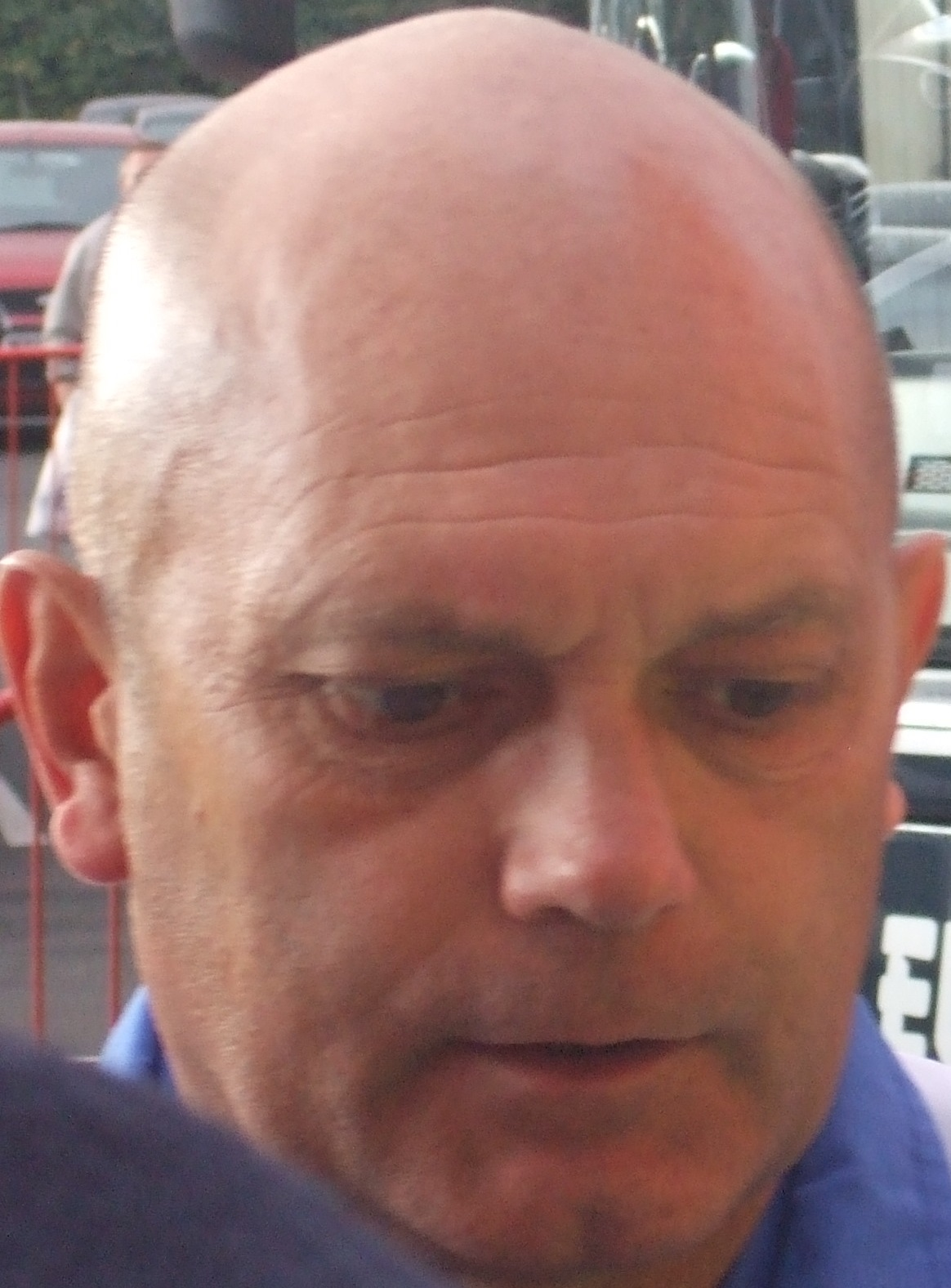
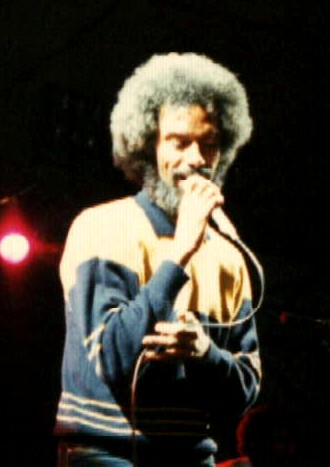
Voice actors Hugh Dennis, Ray Wilkins and Gil Scott-Heron.

The advertisement begins with three young men standing outside a fruit shop or cornershop. One of them (Ben Fox) takes a sip out of a can of Tango he is holding. The voice-over of "commentators" Ralph and Tony (voiced by Hugh Dennis and Ray Wilkins) appear. Ralph says "Hello Tony, I think we might use a video replay here" and the footage of the man drinking the Tango is "rewound" (with the visual effect of a tape recorded being rewound on screen) to some ten seconds before he drinks the Tango, for a "replay". Then, a man painted completely orange wearing only undergarments (Peter Geeves) comes onto the scene, who runs around the men and then taps the Tango drinker on the back.

The Tango drinker turns around, and the orange man slaps him across the cheeks, and then runs off, leaving the drinker startled, although the other men beside the drinker do not observe or respond to the orange man and the slap. Ralph becomes excited as he reveals this to be "Tango taste sensation" and asks Tony to rewind the clip again to the same point as before, this time showing the orange man sprint out from behind a pillar box and shows the same events as before with Ralph and Tony providing commentary. The advertisement ends with the drinker looking at his Tango can in question, followed by a behind shot of the Tango can on top of the orange man's head, which bears the slogan "You Know When You've Been Tango'd". A deep male voice (Gil Scott-Heron) says the slogan at the same time.

== Conception and production ==
=== Background ===
At the time of the advertisement's production, successful soft drink television advertising was dominated by Coca-Cola; Trevor Robinson, co-creator of Orange Man, recalled that "Coca-Cola was the big name in soft-drink advertising then. Nothing was taking on the Coke ads; nothing came close." Robinson recalled that "cause and effect advertising" was very popular in British advertising at the time, which he described as advertisements where "you come into contact with the product and somehow it changes your life for the better, was a big trend." The most recent television advertising campaign for Tango at the time was a series of advertisements featuring the slogan "the whole fruit" that had aired from 1987 to 1991. These advertisements featured musical soundtracks throughout and lacked the surreal humour that would later dominate the soft drink's advertising from Orange Man onwards.

=== Conception ===
Britvic, who had acquired the Tango brand in 1988, were looking to radicalize Tango's image and advertising. They hired London-based advertising agency Howell Henry Chaldecott Lury and Partners (HHCL) to create a brand new television advertisement for the brand, which would form the basis of a new advertising campaign. HHCL, who had been operating since 1987, had earned a reputation in the business for breaking several norms in advertising and established an avant-garde theme in 1989, when, in launching the direct banking service, First Direct, aired two advertisements simultaneously on ITV and Channel 4, interrupting an Audi advert, one offering an optimistic and the other a pessimistic view, and a number of short, surreal spots in which the visual had little or nothing to do with the message. Orange Man was created by HHCL, using their staff Trevor Robinson OBE as art director, Al Young as copywriter, John Leach as planner, Axel Chaldecott and Steve Henry as creative directors and Matt Forrest as director. Production company Limelight also worked on the project. Robinson and Young were creative partners, and were "pretty anti-advertising in [their] mindsets" at the time because of their boredom and frustration with the industry norm of "cause and effect advertising", and were desperate to make a name for themselves after "spending what felt like eons trying to get into a West End agency."

"We knew we had to do something bold, standout and memorable to make sure we didn't find ourselves back on the dole."

— Trevor Robinson referring to his and Al Young's motivation.

Robinson said that the nucleus of their idea for Orange Man came as a reaction to cause and effect advertising, and that he and the team decided to focus on word of mouth as their media, which was a reaction to Coca-Cola's big budget dominance in soft drink advertising. He told Channel 4 in 2000 that the advertisement was "meant to be taking the mickey out of other ads that were on the television at the time", comparing it to coffee advertisements where "they have a drink and go 'oh, whoopy' and flowers bloom," noting that Orange Man decided to "express this in a really OTT fashion". The idea for the advertisement originally started out as a joke, with Robinson recalling "We said how brilliant it would be if you had a drink and something shocking happened, but so quickly that nobody else saw it. We also had the idea that it was only when commentators rewound the film that you could see what had happened." The idea to use commentators in the advert was taken from another idea they had for another advert, but they decided to mash the two ideas together, a "cardinal sin in adland." One commentary considered the advertisement to be a riff "on the sort of sports commentary Andy Gray was bringing to the UK, with his video tapes and ranty shouting at the time."

=== Production ===
"At first, we thought the ad would have a fat orange genie who ran up and kicked the Tango drinker on the bum. Of course, the advertising authority at the time, the BACC, said no way. We got the script cleared by changing the kick to a pleasant, Morecambe and Wise-style slap on the face. I think it's safe to say the little slap got a bit out of hand."

— Trevor Robinson describing the idea change.

The project, including research, lasted two to three months in 1991. The plot of the advertisement originally involved the orange man punching the Tango drinker in the mouth, as they were trying to make the advertisement as "stupid" and slapstick as possible; before they then changed the idea to the orange man kicking Tango drinker up the buttocks, but both ideas were deemed too aggressive, so their final idea of the orange man slapping the drinker across the cheeks, described by Robinson as a "Morecambe and Wise-esque little tap on the cheeks," was used.

The team originally used American football commentators, but we were asked to make "everything more British," so they hired English actor Hugh Dennis to perform the voice of Ralph and ex-footballer Ray Wilkins to perform the voice of Tony; Robinson recalled that Dennis' "Eddie Waring-esque commentary" was deliberately intended to contrasted with the "dry and amusing delivery" of Wilkins. Actors that were intended for the role of the Tango drinker were passed over as they did not like the idea of being slapped; the role ultimately went to actor Ben Fox. Robinson praised him, saying that he was a "really good actor, and he was just the best at reacting to being hit, he never made a big deal out of it," calling his performance "cool and dopey."

The orange man was portrayed by serious up-and-coming actor Peter Geeves; the advert's co-creator Al Young recalled that "the guy we used [Geeves] was like a Shakespearean actor," and noted that out of all who auditioned for the role, "he was the one who made [the creators] laugh the most," adding that the way he ran "was surreal". Robinson recalled, "We knew as soon as he auditioned – the way he ran with his stomach sticking out – that he'd be perfect." Geeves recalled in 2006, "I was asked to first of all run around, then run around and scream, then run around screaming topless, it was at that point I thought 'aye-aye, this isn't the normal run of the mill advert'." The orange paint on him was orange grease paint fixed with hairspray, which took several weeks to remove after filming. Geeves himself was scared of hitting Fox too hard, though Fox did not mind, telling him a hard hit would "make it look real".

Robinson and Young went to the shooting location–a park–to do a test film, which essentially involved them "mucking about, 'Tangoing' each other;" as they "messed around" they decided the "little slap" just wasn't powerful enough, so they exaggerated it; Robinson recalled that "if you watch the ad, the Orange Man's arms go way back before he slaps the person in the face." American jazz poet Gil Scott-Heron was hired to perform the voice who says the slogan at the end because of "his deep, charismatic voice;" Scott-Heron was the first person to see the final advert, and, much to the relief of a fearful Robinson, he loved it.

== Broadcast and controversy ==
Although Orange Man was produced in 1991, it is not believed to have aired on British television until 1992 on television channels such as ITV and Channel 4, where it became the first advertisement in the "You Know When You've Been Tango'd" campaign, which would continue until 1996 before being revived from 2002 to 2005. Orange Man was an instant success; Robinson recalled in 2015 that "I first knew the ad was huge when I fell asleep on the London Underground one evening. I woke up to hear a group of kids talking about and mimicking it. I wanted to go up and say: 'I did that!'"

Nonetheless, Orange Man soon sparked large controversy in the media and in public after it was discovered children had copied the events of the advertisement in playgrounds and injured themselves; Rupert Howell, a Tango advertisement executive, stated in 2000 that Orange Man "sparked a playground craze" where "people used to go round sort of slapping each other and saying 'You've Been Tango'd', and it was all very entertaining and great fun. There were no problems until we got a phone call once from a surgeon who said 'look, I'm not the complaining type but I thought you'd like to know that I did an operation on a child this morning with a damaged ear drum, and I was wheeling him in to the operating table, and said to him 'what happened to you then?' and replied 'I got Tango'd.'" As a result, Howell pulled the advertisement from television that afternoon, although other reports erroneously state that the advertisement was banned.

Orange Man was replaced by two similar versions of the advertisement, the first of these instead showing the orange man putting his hand on the Tango drinker's mouth and kissing it, and the other, which came later, showing the Tango drinker simply running off as the orange man approaches him. The former version was noted by Howell to be "just as good", although presenter Phillip Schofield comically noted in a later commentary that "happy kissing never really caught on." These later versions were also changed to incorporate the recently redesigned Tango Orange can.

== Reception and legacy ==
Despite the controversy, Orange Man was very successful at raising Tango's sales and profile, and sales of Tango Orange rose by more than a third following the airing of Orange Man. Such was its success that in 2001, The Daily Telegraph noted that the brand "eclipsed" the brand's better-known competitors due to the advertisement. The public received Orange Man with great acclaim, but regardless, at the time of its broadcast, television advertising tended to be very slick with "beautiful scripting" and big budgets, so most of the advertising industry did not enjoy Orange Man, with one of the big advertising professionals, who has remained unspecified, calling it "oik advertising." However, HHCL "loved that" and felt they were brave enough to "do stuff that nobody else would do, or think about doing," with Robinsion rhapsodizing in an article he wrote in 2015 that "I think that's what made the ad what it is. Now, years later, that's what makes my own agency what it is."

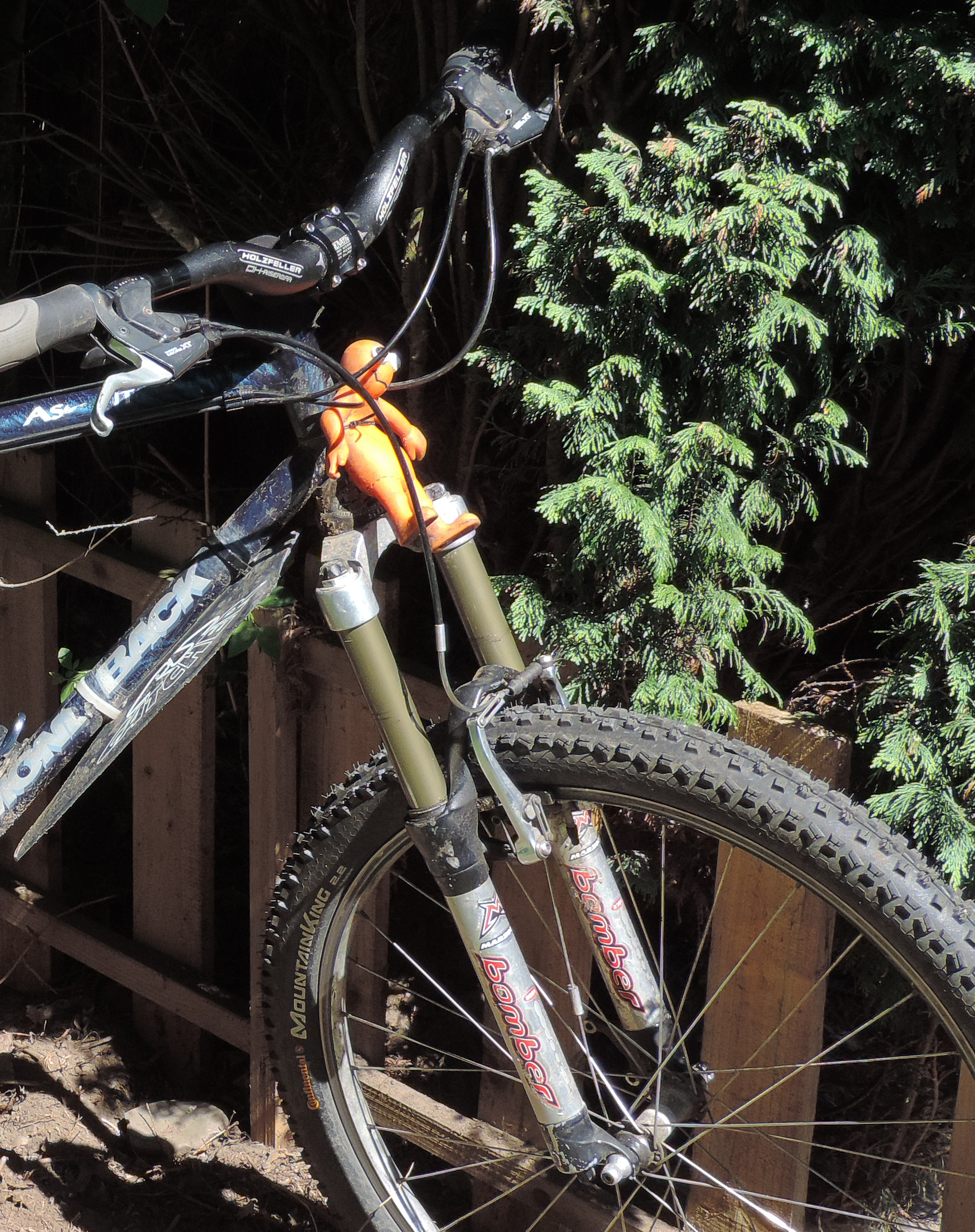
A promotional Orange Tango Man attached to a mountain bike

Despite the original industry hostility, critical favour towards Orange Man has increased in later times and the television advisement has gone on to become considered one of the greatest of all time by numerous sources; in 2000, Orange Man was ranked at number 3 in Channel 4 and The Sunday Times' poll of the "100 Greatest TV Ads Ever." Channel 4 aired the final top 100 of the poll on 29 April 2000 as part of their 100 Greatest series. In 2006, ITV ranked the advertisement ranked at number 5 in its list of "ITV's Best Ads Ever 2", a list of the top 20 television advertisements ever broadcast on the channel. In the commentary for the latter list, Orange Man is credited as a humorous precursor to happy slapping. Sarah McCartney referred to the advertisement in her 2011 book 100 Great Branding Ideas: From Leading Companies Around the World, where she comments that despite the controversy surrounding its slogan, "the phrase had captured the public's imagination." In 2016, Ben Priest, founding partner and chief creative officer at communications agency adam&eveDDB, included the advert in his list of "3 Great Ads I Had Nothing to Do With", part of a series for Campaign Live, where he said "the hype it created and the fondness with which people remember the ad makes it one of the most successful of its time."

In 2013, The Guardian referred to Tango as the "original gangster of viral marketing", saying that Orange Man "was all it took to engage viewers", and that no "Tango crusade since has managed to recapture that lightning in a 500ml bottle." Marketing Society's website The Library states that Orange Man is the reason why Tango is included in their list of the "golden brands of 1992". Furthermore, Campaign Live stated that "no commercial better symbolized the creative iconoclasm of Howell Henry Chaldecott Lury during the early 90s" than Orange Man, and presenter Jenni Falconer said the advert was "brilliant, and everybody loved it and everyone thought it was great." In Nicholas Kochan's 1997 book The World's Greatest Brands, he wrote that the advertisement "succeeded not only in entertaining its audience but also in communicating its taste attributes–the "hit" of real oranges," adding that "the ad's fun scenarios of 'being hooked on Tango' have been extended into other promotions."

Orange Man is also credited by Outmost Studio for pioneering what would later become known as guerilla advertising, with Tim Delaney of Legas Delaney saying "the whole point was that this radical, strong, full-of-attitude campaign worked – it shifted cans of fizzy pop in a way that got Britvic's rivals panicking. It also showed what potential there was in thinking of completely fresh ideas. And better than that – it became part of our culture." Trevor Robinson told The Guardian in 2015 that "You can say 'Tango ad' to people and they still remember it. Some even dress up as the Orange Man today. That, for me, is what makes a piece of work great – when the general public take it on, play with it and it becomes theirs." In the mid-1990s, Orange Man appeared on the brand's promotional VHS tape Now That's What I Call Tango 3, which contained multiple advertisements for the brand from Orange Man until the publication of the VHS tape.

== Aftermath ==
Orange Man was the first of Tango advertisements produced by HHCL, who would work with the brand for many years after, and is now credited as the first of the brand's controversies, as later advertisements for the brand were also banned; in 2000 a "Tango Megaphone" advertisement, starring a pre-fame James Corden, was banned for fears it provoked bullying. This advertisement also had a replacement advert produced, the first time Tango had done this since Orange Man, although this was not an altered version of the original "Tango Megaphone" advertisement, but instead a short advertisement satirising the ban. Orange Man is considered one of two definitive Tango television advertisements, alongside St George, also produced by HHCL, which aired in 1996 in promotion of the brand's Blackcurrant variant, and is the only Tango advertisement besides Orange Man to feature in lists of the best television advertisements of all time.

Orange Man was parodied in a sketch from a 1992 episode of The Real McCoy that also parodies the assault of Rodney King, showing the Tango drinker, an actor portraying King, getting assaulted by the Los Angeles Police Department after drinking a "Tango'd" can in his car, ending with the slogan "You Know When You Have Been L.A.P.D'd". Tango themselves later parodied the slap in a 1997 advertisement, Vote Orange Tango, which was a parody of a party political broadcast that was broadcast in the run-up to the 1997 general election; the advertisement sees a mock politician criticising the flavours of the drink that were not orange before praising the orange flavour, with a man painted orange later slapping the politician's cheeks several times with an orange fish as part of the politician's parade to celebrate the orange flavour.

=== Campaign ===
Orange Man marked the debut for the highly successful "You Know When You've Been Tango'd" television campaign, created by HHCL throughout its first run, which would continue in its first run until 1996. Although Orange Man was the most notorious of the advertisements, other advertisements in the campaign also proved to be controversial and were banned, including Exploding Pensioner (1993) which offended pensioners and several charity groups such as Age Concern, Scotsman (1994)–which featured a legless, blue afro-sporting orange Scotsman–for scaring children, and another 1994 advertisement featuring a man's head pop off from his body, which was banned during children's programming for also being too frightening. Nonetheless, by 1994, the campaign had helped Tango double its share on the soft drinks market. One commentary later said "While it's a matter of debate as to how offensive these ads were deemed, as opposed to how good HHCL were at pretending they were offensive and exploiting the publicity, the phrase 'You Know When You've Been Tango'd' wasn't going anywhere for the next decade."

In May 2002, the "You Know When You've Been Tango'd" campaign relaunched with the advertisements Helmet and Porcupine on the tenth anniversary of the campaign and Orange Man, although this campaign was created by Chi instead of HHCL, who ended their ten-year relationship the year before. However, these advertisements were intended to hark back to the "irreverent orange hit" motif established in Orange Man. In 2004, the Pipes advertisement from the campaign, which drew comparisons to Orange Man in the media, was banned, becoming the last Tango advertisement to do so; however the ban was not because children had already injured themselves, but because there were fears that children were going to. In August 2006, Tango's main rival drink, Fanta, aired an advertisement with similarly saw a man being slapped, however unlike Orange Man it escaped being banned.

== See also ==
- Tango (drink)
- Pipes (advertisement)
- St George (advertisement)
- Computer Graphic (advertisement)
