= The 100 Greatest TV Ads =

- Genre: Countdown list show
- Presented by: Graham Norton (2000, 2003, 2004); Nick Grimshaw and Miquita Oliver (2007)
- Country of origin: United Kingdom

Production
- Running time: 180 minutes (inc. adverts)
- Production company: Tyne Tees

Original release
- Network: Channel 4 E4
- Release: 29 April 2000

The 100 Greatest TV Ads is a British TV entertainment programme that first aired on 29 April 2000 on Channel 4. It is part of the channel's 100 Greatest strand of programmes, and was presented by Graham Norton (except for a repeat on E4 in 2007 which was presented by Nick Grimshaw and Miquita Oliver).

== Summary ==
The programme counted down the 100 greatest ever television adverts shown on British television since the launch of commercial broadcasting in 1955. A public poll was conducted on both the Channel 4 website and The Sunday Times newspaper to determine the outcome of the result.

In addition to the programme showing the top 100 adverts, it also featured contributions from special guests and those who worked behind the scenes on the adverts. There were also two feature contributions in the programme, one from Peter Kay looking at some of the most obscure adverts in history, and the other showcased some classic international adverts with Gail Porter.

== Top 100 ==
| Number | Brand/Company/Product | Advert | Year |
|---|---|---|---|
| 1 | Jaffa Cakes | Total Eclipse | 1999 |
| 2 | Smash | Martians | 1973 |
| 3 | Tango | Orange Man | 1991 |
| 4 | Heat Electric | Creature Comforts | 1991 |
| 5 | Boddingtons | Melanie Sykes | 1997 |
| 6 | Levi's | Laundrette | 1985 |
| 7 | R. White's Lemonade | Secret Lemonade Drinker | 1973 |
| 8 | Hamlet | Happiness Is... | 1966-91 |
| 9 | Walkers Crisps | Gary Lineker | 1993 onwards |
| 10 | Impulse | Chance Encounter | 1998 |
| 11 | Cinzano | Collins & Rossiter | 1978 |
| 12 | Renault Clio | Papa and Nicole | 1991-98 |
| 13 | Yellow Pages | J. R. Hartley | 1983 |
| 14 | British Telecom | Ology | 1988 |
| 15 | Nike | Park Life | 1997 |
| 16 | Coca-Cola | Teach The World To Sing | 1971 |
| 17 | Carling Black Label | Dambusters | 1989 |
| 18 | Glade Shake n' Vac | Dancing Woman | 1979 |
| 19 | Andrex | Puppy | 1972 onwards |
| 20 | Real Fires | Furry Friends | 1988 |
| 21 | Ferrero Rocher | Ambassador's Party | 1995 |
| 22 | Oxo | The Oxo Family | 1958-99 |
| 23 | Wall's Cornetto | Just One Cornetto | 1980 |
| 24 | PG Tips | Chimps | 1956 onwards |
| 25 | Castlemaine XXXX | Sherry | 1986 |
| 26 | Cadbury Flake | Flake Girls | 1959 onwards |
| 27 | Nestlé Milkybar | The Milkybar Kid | 1961 onwards |
| 28 | Hovis | The Bike Ride | 1974 |
| 29 | Heineken | Water In Majorca | 1985 |
| 30 | Kit Kat | Pandas | 1989 |
| 31 | Nescafé Gold Blend | Couple | 1987-93 |
| 32 | Duracell | Bunny | 1981 onwards |
| 33 | John Smith's | Dog Tricks | 1981 |
| 34 | Pepsi | Swedish Girl | 1974 |
| 35 | Martini | Any Time, Any Place | 1971 |
| 36 | Cadbury Fruit & Nut | Fruit & Nutcase | 1977 onwards |
| 37 | Fry's Turkish Delight | Eastern Promise | 1957 onwards |
| 38 | Apple | 1984 | 1984 |
| 39 | Foster's Lager | Ballet | 1984 |
| 40 | Tetley | Tetley Tea Folk | 1973 onwards |
| 41 | Campari | Luton Airport | 1977 |
| 42 | Volkswagen Golf | Changes | 1988 |
| 43 | Old Spice | Surfer ("mark of a man") | 1977 |
| 44 | Esso | Tiger | 1964 onwards |
| 45 | One2One | Ian2Martin | 1997 |
| 46 | Unigate | Humphrey | 1975 |
| 47 | Mates | Chemist Shop | 1987 |
| 48 | Cadbury Milk Tray | Avalanche | 1974 |
| 49 | Heinz Baked Beans | Beanz Meanz Heinz | 1967 onwards |
| 50 | Stella Artois | Flowers | 1991 |
| 51 | Dulux | Dulux Dog | 1964 onwards |
| 52 | Homepride | Flour Men | 1967 |
| 53 | Sugar Puffs | Honey Monster | 1976 onwards |
| 54 | Holsten Pils | Griff Rhys Jones | 1983 |
| 55 | Whiskas | Eight Out Of Ten Cats | 1975 onwards |
| 56 | Fiat Strada | Handbuilt By Robots | 1979 |
| 57 | After Eight | Dinner Party | 1963 onwards |
| 58 | Hoffmeister | Follow The Bear | 1983 |
| 59 | Audi | Vorsprung Durch Technik | 1984 onwards |
| 60 | Kellogg's Rice Krispies | Snap, Crackle & Pop | 1955 onwards |
| 61 | Maxell | Ears Are Alight | 1989 |
| 62 | British Airways | Face | 1989 |
| 63 | Yorkie | Coast To Coast | 1976 |
| 64 | Schweppes | Shh...You Know Who | 1963 |
| 65 | Birds Eye Fish Fingers | Captain Birdseye | 1968 onwards |
| 66 | Toshiba | Hello Tosh | 1984 |
| 67 | Sony | Armchair | 1995 |
| 68 | British Gas | If You See Sid | 1986 |
| 69 | Dunlop Tyres | Tested For The Unexpected | 1993 |
| 70 | Cresta | Singing Polar Bear | 1972 |
| 71 | The Guardian | Points of View | 1986 |
| 72 | Fairy | Hands That Do Dishes | 1964 onwards |
| 73 | Murray Mints | Too Good To Hurry Mints | 1955 |
| 74 | Lego | Kipper | 1980 |
| 75 | Mars | Work, Rest & Play | 1978 onwards |
| 76 | InterCity | Relax | 1988 |
| 77 | Egg Marketing Board | Go to Work On An Egg | 1966 |
| 78 | Olympus | Wedding Photographer | 1977 |
| 79 | Remington | Victor Kiam | 1978 |
| 80 | Birds Eye Beefburgers | Ben & Mary | 1974 |
| 81 | Fruit Gums | Fruit Gums Mum | 1956 |
| 82 | Shell | We're Going Shell | 1963 |
| 83 | Cointreau | Christian & Katherine | 1974 onwards |
| 84 | Brut | Henry Cooper | 1976 |
| 85 | Courage Best | Gertcha | 1979 |
| 86 | Nimble | Balloon | 1973 |
| 87 | Strand | You're Never Alone With | 1959 |
| 88 | Double Diamond | Works Wonders | 1968 |
| 89 | Chunky | Clement Freud & Henry | 1967 |
| 90 | Barclaycard | Alan Whicker | 1984 |
| 91 | Benson & Hedges | Istanbul | 1974 |
| 92 | Gibbs SR | Tingling Fresh | 1955 |
| 93 | Timex | Tick-a-Tick Timex | 1964 |
| 94 | Parker Pens | Finishing School | 1975 |
| 95 | Charlie | Charlie Girl | 1975 |
| 96 | Sainsbury's | Celebrity Recipes | 1992 |
| 97 | Clarks | Foot Drawing | 1976 |
| 98 | Meccano | Boy In A Man's World | 1967 |
| 99 | Pedigree Chum | Top Breeders | 1974 |
| 100 | Stork SB | Taste The Difference | 1978 |

== Great Ads of the 21st Century ==
Since its original broadcast, the programme has been repeated numerous times on both Channel 4 and E4. On several reruns — in 2003, 2004 and 2007 — additional inserts were added that showed some adverts that were not part of the original vote in 2000. These were, in order of appearance:

- Reebok - Belly's Gonna Get You
- John West Foods - Bear Fight (only included in the 2003 re-run)
- Adidas - David Beckham & Jonny Wilkinson (only included in the 2004 re-run)
- Metz - Judderman
- Bacardi Breezer - Tomcat
- John Smith's - Diving
- Monster.co.uk - Beware Of The Voices (only included in the 2003 re-run)
- Lynx Pulse - Make Luv (only included in the 2004 re-run)
- Microsoft Xbox - Life Is Short, Play More
- Bachelors Super Noodles - Face Off (only included in the 2007 re-run)
- Citroen - Transformer Dance (only included in the 2007 re-run)
- Skoda Fabia - Cake Car (only included in the 2007 re-run)
- Honda - Cog (only included in the 2007 re-run)
- Cadbury's Dairy Milk - Gorilla (only included in the 2007 re-run)
- 118 118 - Rocky (only included in the 2007 re-run)
- Sony Bravia - Paint (only included in the 2007 re-run)

== See also ==
- 100 Greatest (TV series)
