= 100 Greatest (TV series) =

UK television series

- Title screen for The 100 Greatest TV Characters
- Genre: Archive show, countdown list show
- Presented by: Graham Norton; Zoë Ball; Ardal O'Hanlon; Jamie Theakston; Vinnie Jones; Bob Mortimer; Jimmy Carr; Anna Chancellor; Denise Van Outen; John Cleese; Stephen Fry; Various others
- Narrated by: Dickie Davies; Ann Bryson; Fern Britton; Various others
- Country of origin: United Kingdom
- Original language: English
- No. of episodes: 60

Production
- Running time: Varies
- Production companies: Tyne Tees; Yorkshire; Hotbed; Shine; North One; Radar; Granada; Objective; Visual Voodoo; Twofour

Original release
- Network: Channel 4
- Release: 11 September 1999 – 10 October 2015

100 Greatest is a long-running television strand on Channel 4 in the United Kingdom that was originally broadcast from 11 September 1999 to 10 October 2015. The lists presented are generally the result of public polls, and reflect the votes of visitors to the Channel 4 website. However, the results of some are determined by experts. The programmes are usually broadcast in the weekend schedule, in three- or four-hour blocks, throughout the year. Although the strand has never been officially retired, there have been no new editions since 2015.

== Episodes ==
No.	Title	Presenter(s)	Original release date	Viewers (millions)
1	"TV's 100 Greatest Moments"	Graham Norton	11 September 1999	2.71
Top 10: 1. Man lands on the Moon (1969); 2. Release of Nelson Mandela (1990); 3. Michael Portillo loses his seat (1997); 4. Death of Princess Diana (1997); 5. Fall of the Berlin Wall (1989); 6. 1966 FIFA World Cup Final (1966); 7. Del Boy falls through the bar (Only Fools and Horses, 1989); 8. Live Aid (1985); 9. Blackadder goes over the top (Blackadder Goes Forth, 1989); 10. Assassination of John F. Kennedy (1963)
2	"The 100 Greatest TV Ads"	Graham Norton	29 April 2000	4.02
Top 10: 1. Surfers (Guinness, 1999); 2. Martians (Smash, 1973); 3. Orange Man (Tango, 1991); 4. Heat Electric (Electric Central Heating, 1991); 5. Melanie Sykes (Boddingtons, 1995); 6. Launderette (Levi's, 1985); 7. Secret Lemonade Drinker (R. White's, 1973); 8. Happiness Is... (Hamlet, 1964 onwards); 9. Gary Lineker (Walkers, 1993 onwards); 10. Chance Encounter (Impulse, 1998)
3	"100 Greatest TV Moments from Hell"	Zoë Ball	9 September 2000	3.42
Top 10: 1. Richard Madeley's Ali G impression (This Morning); 2. The Brits with Mick and Sam (1989 Brit Awards); 3. Tara Palmer-Tomkinson on Frank Skinner (The Frank Skinner Show); 4. Shakin' Stevens attacks Richard Madeley (Calendar Goes Pop); 5. David Blaine on GMTV (GMTV); 6. Julian Clary's 'fisting' gag (British Comedy Awards); 7. Naked Jungle; 8. New Hall College on University Challenge (University Challenge); 9. Soap characters played by different actors 10. 3-2-1
4	"The 100 Greatest Number One Singles"	Graham Norton	6 January 2001	4.30
Top 10: 1. "Imagine" – John Lennon; 2. "Bohemian Rhapsody" – Queen; 3. "Hey Jude" – The Beatles; 4. "Dancing Queen" – ABBA; 5. "Every Breath You Take" – The Police; 6. "Stand By Me" – Ben E. King; 7. "The Drugs Don't Work" – The Verve; 8. "Don't Look Back in Anger" – Oasis; 9. "Groovejet (If This Ain't Love)" – Spiller; 10. "(Everything I Do) I Do It for You" – Bryan Adams
5–6	"100 Greatest TV Characters"	Ardal O'Hanlon	5 May 2001 (part one); 6 May 2001 (part two)	2.47 (part one); 3.46 (part two)
Top 10: 1. Homer Simpson (The Simpsons); 2. Basil Fawlty (Fawlty Towers); 3. Edmund Blackadder (Blackadder); 4. Del Boy (Only Fools and Horses); 5. Father Dougal McGuire (Father Ted); 6. The Doctor (Doctor Who); 7. Alan Partridge (The Day Today/Knowing Me, Knowing You/I'm Alan Partridge); 8. Ali G (The 11 O'Clock Show/Da Ali G Show); 9. Victor Meldrew (One Foot in the Grave); 10. Niles Crane (Frasier)
7	"The 100 Greatest Kids' TV Shows"	Jamie Theakston	27 August 2001	3.92
Top 10: 1. The Simpsons (1987 onwards); 2. The Muppet Show (1976–1981); 3. Danger Mouse (1981–1993); 4. Bagpuss (1974); 5. Grange Hill (1978 onwards); 6. Mr Benn (1971); 7. Rainbow (1971–1992); 8. Scooby-Doo (1969 onwards); 9. Doctor Who (1963–1989); 10. He-Man and the Masters of the Universe (1982)
8–9	"100 Greatest Films"	Graham Norton	24 November 2001 (part one); 25 November 2001 (part two)	2.56 (part one); 3.56 (part two)
Top 10: 1. Star Wars/The Empire Strikes Back (1977/1980); 2. The Godfather/The Godfather Part II (1972/1974); 3. The Shawshank Redemption (1994); 4. Pulp Fiction (1994); 5. Some Like It Hot (1959); 6. Gladiator (2000); 7. It's a Wonderful Life (1946); 8. Blade Runner (1982); 9. Schindler's List (1993); 10. Goodfellas (1990)
10	"100 Greatest TV Treats of the Year"	Jamie Theakston	29 December 2001	2.33
Top 10: 1. England 5 Germany 1; 2. John Prescott's Rumble in Rhyl; 3. Ali G interviews Posh and Becks (Comic Relief); 4. The Blue Planet; 5. Celebrity Big Brother; 6. Jeffrey Archer is jailed 7. Popstars; 8. Who Shot Phil? (EastEnders); 9. Beckham's free kick v Greece; 10. Big Brother 2
11–12	"100 Greatest Sporting Moments"	Vinnie Jones (presenter); Dickie Davies (narrator)	12 January 2002 (part one); 19 January 2002 (part two)	1.98 (part two)
Top 10: 1. Steve Redgrave goes for his fifth gold (Sydney Olympics, 2000); 2. Germany vs England (World Cup Qualifier, Munich 2001); 3. England vs West Germany (World Cup Final, Wembley 1966); 4. Manchester United vs Bayern Munich (Champions League Final, Barcelona 1999); 5. Ian Botham at Headingley (England vs Australia, The Ashes 1981); 6. Maradona's Hand of God (England vs Argentina, World Cup 1986); 7. The Rumble in the Jungle (Ali vs Foreman, Zaire 1974); 8. Torvill and Dean's Bolero (Sarajevo Winter Olympics, 1984); 9. Taylor and Davis's Black Ball finish (Embassy World Snooker Final, 1985); 10. Borg and McEnroe's tie break (Wimbledon Men's Singles Final, 1980)
13	"100 Greatest World Cup Moments"	Bob Mortimer	18 May 2002	2.62
Top 10: 1. Maradona's second goal (England v Argentina, Mexico 1986); 2. Michael Owen's solo goal against Argentina (England v Argentina, France 1998); 3. Germany 1–5 England (World Cup Qualifier, 2001); 4. Some people are on the pitch (England v W Germany, England 1966); 5. Brazilian teamwork (Brazil v Italy, Mexico 1970); 6. Pearce and Waddle miss (England v W Germany, Italy 1990); 7. Only Bergkamp can do this (Holland v Argentina, France 1998); 8. The hand of God (England v Argentina, Mexico 1986); 9. Pele's dummy (Mexico 1970); 10. Ireland's penalty shoot out (Ireland v Romania, Italy 1990)
14	"The Ultimate Chart"	Avid Merrion (presenter); Sarah Alexander (narrator)	16 November 2002	Unknown
Top 10: 1. Elton John – "Candle in the Wind '97" (1997, UK sales 4,864,611); 2. Band Aid – "Do They Know It's Christmas?" (1984, UK sales 3,550,000); 3. Queen – "Bohemian Rhapsody" (1975, UK sales 2,130,000); 4. Wings – "Mull of Kintyre" / "Girls' School" (1977, UK sales 2,050,000); 5. Boney M – "Rivers of Babylon" / "Brown Girl in the Ring" (1978, UK sales 1,985,000); 6. John Travolta & Olivia Newton-John – "You're the One That I Want" (1978, UK sales 1,975,000); 7. Frankie Goes to Hollywood – "Relax" (1983, UK sales 1,910,000); 8. The Beatles – "She Loves You" (1963, UK sales 1,890,000); 9. Robson & Jerome – "Unchained Melody" (1995, UK sales 1,843,701); 10. Boney M – "Mary's Boy Child – Oh My Lord" (1978, UK sales 1,790,000)
15	"100 Greatest TV Treats of 2002"	Harry Hill	31 December 2002	2.02
Top 10: 1. The Office; 2. The Osbournes; 3. Phoenix Nights; 4. Pop Idol – Will vs Gareth; 5. Big Brother 3; 6. England v Argentina; 7. 24; 8. Faking It; 9. Six Feet Under; 10. I'm a Celebrity...Get Me Out of Here!
16–17	"100 Greatest Movie Stars"	Richard E. Grant	4 May 2003 (part one); 5 May 2003 (part two)	2.33 (part one); 2.92 (part two)
Top 10: 1. Al Pacino; 2. Robert De Niro; 3. Tom Hanks; 4. Kevin Spacey; 5. Harrison Ford; 6. Jack Nicholson; 7. Anthony Hopkins; 8. Sean Connery; 9. Ewan McGregor; 10. Cary Grant
18	"100 Worst Britons"	Jimmy Carr	10 May 2003	2.77
Top 10: 1. Tony Blair; 2. Jordan; 3. Margaret Thatcher; 4. Jade Goody; 5. Martin Bashir; 6. Gareth Gates; 7. Alex Ferguson; 8. 'H' from Steps; 9. Geri Halliwell; 10. The Queen
19–20	"The 100 Greatest Scary Moments"	Jimmy Carr	25 October 2003 (part one); 26 October 2003 (part two)	2.53 (part one); 2.58 (part two)
Top 10: 1. The Shining; 2. The Exorcist; 3. Jaws; 4. Alien; 5. The Blair Witch Project; 6. Ring; 7. Halloween; 8. The Texas Chain Saw Massacre; 9. The Omen; 10. A Nightmare On Elm Street
21	"100 Greatest Sexy Moments"	Anna Chancellor	29 November 2003	3.06
Top 10: 1. Dr. No (1962); 2. Cruel Intentions (1999); 3. From Dusk till Dawn (1996); 4. Out of Sight (1998); 5. Basic Instinct (1992); 6. 9½ Weeks (1986); 7. Queer as Folk (1999); 8. Who Framed Roger Rabbit (1988); 9. Emmanuelle (1974); 10. American Pie (1999)
22	"The 100 Greatest TV Treats of 2003"	Jimmy Carr	24 December 2003	2.33
Top 10: 1. England's World Cup rugby 2. Wife Swap; 3. Jacko meets Bashir; 4. Dirty Den; 5. Tonight Special: The Millionaire Trial; 6. How Clean Is Your House?; 7. Britain score nil points at Eurovision; 8. Cold Feet; 9. Tricky Dicky; 10. Little Britain
23–24	"100 Greatest Musicals"	Denise Van Outen	26 December 2003 (part one); 27 December 2003 (part two)	2.15 (part one); 3.83 (part two)
Top 10: 1. Grease (1978); 2. The Sound of Music (1965); 3. The Wizard of Oz (1939); 4. West Side Story (1961); 5. Mary Poppins (1964); 6. Singin' in the Rain (1952); 7. The Rocky Horror Picture Show (1975); 8. Chicago (2002); 9. Oliver! (1968); 10. Moulin Rouge! (2001)
25	"100 Worst Pop Records"	Jimmy Carr (presenter); Ann Bryson (narrator)	1 January 2004	2.99
Top 10: 1. "Cheeky Song (Touch My Bum)" – The Cheeky Girls; 2. "The Millennium Prayer" – Cliff Richard; 3. "Agadoo" – Black Lace; 4. "Candle in the Wind 1997" – Elton John; 5. "Fast Food Song" – Fast Food Rockers; 6. "Mr Blobby" – Mr Blobby; 7. "Because We Want To" – Billie; 8. "Barbie Girl" – Aqua; 9. "Achy Breaky Heart" – Billy Ray Cyrus; 10. "Jenny from the Block" – Jennifer Lopez
26	"The Ultimate Pop Star"	Smashie and Nicey	22 February 2004	Unknown
Top 10: 1. Cliff Richard; 2. The Beatles; 3. Elvis Presley; 4. Madonna; 5. Elton John; 6. Michael Jackson; 7. Queen; 8. ABBA; 9. Paul McCartney; 10. David Bowie
27–28	"The Ultimate Film"	John Cleese (presenter); Fern Britton (narrator)	27 November 2004 (part one); 28 November 2004 (part two)	2.31 (part one); 3.32 (part two)
Top 10: 1. Gone with the Wind (1940, estimated admissions 35m); 2. The Sound of Music (1965, estimated admissions 30m); 3. Snow White and the Seven Dwarfs (1938, estimated admissions 28m); 4. Star Wars (1978, estimated admissions 20.76m); 5. Spring in Park Lane (1948, estimated admissions 20.5m); 6. The Best Years of Our Lives (1947, estimated admissions 20.4m); 7. The Jungle Book (1968, estimated admissions 19.8m); 8. Titanic (1998, estimated admissions 18.91m); 9. The Wicked Lady (1946, estimated admissions 18.4m); 10. The Seventh Veil (1945, estimated admissions 17.9m)
29	"100 Greatest Christmas Moments"	Jimmy Carr	24 December 2004	2.04
Top 10: 1. Band Aid – "Do They Know It's Christmas?" (1984); 2. Father Ted – "A Christmassy Ted" (Christmas Eve 1996); 3. The Snowman (Boxing Day 1982); 4. The Office Christmas specials (26 and 27 December 2003); 5. Only Fools and Horses Christmas specials (1981–2002); 6. The Vicar of Dibley Christmas specials (1996–present); 7. Slade – "Merry Xmas Everybody" (1973); 8. Wallace and Gromit – A Close Shave (Christmas Eve 1995); 9. Blackadder's Christmas Carol (23 December 1988); 10. It's a Wonderful Life (1946)
30	"The 100 Greatest TV Treats of 2004"	Jimmy Carr	26 December 2004	1.80
Top 10: 1. Final episode of Friends; 2. Big Brother 5; 3. Final episode of Sex and the City; 4. Strictly Come Dancing; 5. I'm a Celebrity...Get Me Out of Here! (both series); 6. Himalaya with Michael Palin; 7. Great Britain triumphs at the Olympics; 8. Peter Kay appears in Coronation Street; 9. Green Wing; 10. The Boy Whose Skin Fell Off
31	"The Comedian's Comedian"	Jimmy Carr	1 January 2005	2.63
Top 10: 1. Peter Cook; 2. John Cleese; 3. Woody Allen; 4. Eric Morecambe; 5. Groucho Marx; 6. Tommy Cooper; 7. Laurel and Hardy; 8. Billy Connolly; 9. Vic Reeves and Bob Mortimer; 10. Richard Pryor
32	"The 100 Greatest Pop Videos"	Jimmy Carr	6 February 2005	2.25
Top 10: 1. "Thriller" – Michael Jackson (1983); 2. "Sledgehammer" – Peter Gabriel (1986); 3. "Take On Me" – A-ha (1985); 4. "Bohemian Rhapsody" – Queen (1975); 5. "Like a Prayer" – Madonna (1989); 6. "Rock DJ" – Robbie Williams (2000); 7. "Billie Jean" – Michael Jackson (1983); 8. "Bitter Sweet Symphony" – The Verve (1997); 9. "Vogue" – Madonna (1990); 10. "Smells Like Teen Spirit" – Nirvana (1991)
33	"The 100 Greatest Tearjerkers"	Jimmy Carr	13 February 2005	2.08
Top 10: 1. E.T. the Extra-Terrestrial (1982); 2. The Green Mile (1999); 3. Titanic (1997); 4. It's a Wonderful Life (1946); 5. Ghost (1990); 6. Bambi (1942); 7. The Shawshank Redemption (1994); 8. The Champ (1979); 9. Field of Dreams (1989); 10. My Girl (1991)
34	"100 Greatest Cartoons"	Jimmy Carr	27 February 2005	3.14
Top 100: 1. The Simpsons (1987–present); 2. Tom and Jerry (1940–present); 3. South Park (1997–present); 4. Toy Story/Toy Story 2 (1995 & 1999); 5. Family Guy (1999–present); 6. Shrek/Shrek 2 (2000 & 2004); 7. The Lion King (1994); 8. Spirited Away (2001); 9. The Incredibles (2004); 10. Bugs Bunny (1938–present)
35	"50 Greatest Comedy Sketches"	Tom Baker	3 April 2005	3.30
Top 10: 1. "Lou and Andy (Swimming Pool)" (Little Britain); 2. "Petshop/Dead Parrot" (Monty Python's Flying Circus); 3. "Tubbs and Edward (Road Men)" (The League of Gentlemen); 4. "Vicky Pollard (Swimming Pool)" (Little Britain); 5. "Four Candles" (The Two Ronnies); 6. "Going for an English" (Goodness Gracious Me); 7. "Acorn Antiques" (Victoria Wood as Seen on TV); 8. "Breakfast" (The Morecambe & Wise Show); 9. "Ted and Ralph (Drinking Game)" (The Fast Show); 10. "Good Aids/Bad Aids" (Brass Eye)
36	"100 Greatest Albums"	Alexander Armstrong	17 April 2005	2.30
Top 10: 1. OK Computer – Radiohead (1997); 2. The Joshua Tree – U2 (1987); 3. Nevermind – Nirvana (1991); 4. Thriller – Michael Jackson (1982); 5. The Dark Side of the Moon – Pink Floyd (1973); 6. Definitely Maybe – Oasis (1994); 7. Sgt. Pepper's Lonely Hearts Club Band – The Beatles (1967); 8. Like a Prayer – Madonna (1989); 9. Appetite for Destruction – Guns N' Roses (1987); 10. Revolver – The Beatles (1966)
37–38	"100 Greatest War Films"	Sean Pertwee	14 May 2005 (part one); 15 May 2005 (part two)	1.63 (part one); 2.34 (part two)
Top 10: 1. Saving Private Ryan (1998); 2. Apocalypse Now (1979); 3. The Great Escape (1963); 4. Schindler's List (1993); 5. Full Metal Jacket (1987); 6. Platoon (1986); 7. A Bridge Too Far (1977); 8. Zulu (1964); 9. Black Hawk Down (2001); 10. The Bridge on the River Kwai (1957)
39	"50 Greatest Documentaries"	Zoë Wanamaker	9 October 2005	N/A
Top 10: 1. Seven Up! (1964); 2. Touching the Void (2003); 3. Bowling for Columbine (2002); 4. The World at War (1973); 5. Capturing the Friedmans (2003); 6. The Boy Whose Skin Fell Off (2004); 7. Life on Earth (1979); 8. Fahrenheit 9/11 (2004); 9. When We Were Kings (1996); 10. Faking It (2000)
40–41	"100 Greatest Family Films"	Bob Hoskins	22 December 2005 (part one); 23 December 2005 (part two)	2.26 (part one); 2.93 (part two)
Top 10: 1. E.T. the Extra-Terrestrial (1982); 2. Shrek (2001); 3. Mary Poppins (1964); 4. Pirates of the Caribbean: The Curse of the Black Pearl (2003); 5. Toy Story (1995); 6. The Lion King (1994); 7. Back to the Future (1985); 8. Willy Wonka & the Chocolate Factory (1971); 9. Star Wars (1977); 10. The Wizard of Oz (1939)
42	"50 Greatest Comedy Films"	Stephen Fry	1 January 2006	2.21
Top 10: 1. Monty Python's Life of Brian (1979); 2. Airplane! (1980); 3. Shaun of the Dead (2004); 4. Austin Powers: International Man of Mystery (1997); 5. South Park: Bigger, Longer & Uncut (1999); 6. Monty Python and the Holy Grail (1975); 7. American Pie (1999); 8. Blazing Saddles (1974); 9. There's Something About Mary (1998); 10. This Is Spinal Tap (1984)
43	"The Ultimate Sitcom"	Alexander Armstrong	2 January 2006	Unknown
Top 10: 1. Frasier; 2. Fawlty Towers; 3. Seinfeld; 4. Porridge; 5. The Larry Sanders Show; 6. The Phil Silvers Show; 7. Dad's Army; 8. Blackadder; 9. Spaced; 10. The Office
44	"100 Greatest Funny Moments"	Rob Brydon	26 February 2006	N/A
Top 10: 1. Peter Kay; 2. Have I Got News For You?; 3. Trigger Happy TV; 4. Brass Eye; 5. This Is Spinal Tap; 6. The 11 O'Clock Show: Ali G 7. Curb Your Enthusiasm; 8. Dead Ringers; 9. George Bush; 10. The Mrs Merton Show
45	"50 Greatest One Hit Wonders"	Justin Lee Collins	7 May 2006	1.86
Top 10: 1. "Kung Fu Fighting" – Carl Douglas (September 1974); 2. "99 Red Balloons" – Nena (March 1984); 3. "Because I Got High" – Afroman (October 2001); 4. "Sugar, Sugar" – The Archies (October 1969); 5. "Can You Dig It?" – The Mock Turtles (April 1991); 6. "Always Look on the Bright Side of Life" – Monty Python (April 1991); 7. "Spirit in the Sky" – Doctor and the Medics (June 1986); 8. "Who Let the Dogs Out?" – Baha Men (October 2000); 9. "The Safety Dance" – Men Without Hats (November 1983); 10. "Two Pints of Lager and a Packet of Crisps Please" – Splodgenessabounds (June 1980)
46	"50 Films to See Before You Die"	Richard Teideman	22 July 2006	N/A
Top 10: 1. Apocalypse Now (1979); 2. The Apartment (1960); 3. City of God (2002); 4. Chinatown (1974); 5. Sexy Beast (2000); 6. 2001: A Space Odyssey (1968); 7. North by Northwest (1959); 8. À bout de souffle (1960); 9. Donnie Darko (2001); 10. Manhattan (1979)
47	"30 Greatest Political Comedies"	Charles Kennedy & Michael Howard (presenters); Miranda Richardson (narrator)	11 December 2006	N/A
Top 10: 1. Yes Minister (BBC2, 1980–1984); 2. Spitting Image (ITV, 1984–1996); 3. Bremner, Bird and Fortune (Channel 4, 1998–2006); 4. Have I Got News for You (BBC1/BBC2, 1990–present); 5. Drop the Dead Donkey (Channel 4, 1990–1998); 6. Little Britain (BBC, 2003–present); 7. That Was the Week That Was (BBC1, 1962–1963); 8. The New Statesman (ITV, 1987–1992); 9. Not the Nine O'Clock News (BBC2, 1979–1982); 10. Dead Ringers (BBC2, 2002–present)
48	"50 Greatest Television Dramas"	Miriam Margolyes	3 February 2007	N/A
Top 10: 1. The Sopranos; 2. Boys from the Blackstuff; 3. Edge of Darkness; 4. The Singing Detective; 5. Cathy Come Home; 6. The West Wing; 7. Cracker; 8. Our Friends in the North; 9. Twin Peaks; 10. Heimat
49	"100 Greatest Sex Symbols"	Anna Chancellor	24 February 2007	N/A
Top 10: 1. Angelina Jolie; 2. Elvis Presley; 3. Marilyn Monroe; 4. Beyoncé; 5. Brad Pitt; 6. Lara Croft; 7. George Clooney; 8. Kylie Minogue; 9. Johnny Depp; 10. Scarlett Johansson
50	"The 100 Greatest Stand-Ups"	Ann Bryson	18 March 2007	2.88
Top 10: 1. Billy Connolly; 2. Peter Kay; 3. Eddie Izzard; 4. Richard Pryor; 5. Harry Hill; 6. Bill Hicks; 7. Bill Bailey; 8. Victoria Wood; 9. Chris Rock; 10. Ross Noble
51	"The World's Greatest Comedy Characters"	Simon Pegg	14 April 2007	1.70
Top 10: 1. Basil Fawlty (Fawlty Towers); 2. Alan Partridge (The Day Today/Knowing Me, Knowing You/I'm Alan Partridge); 3. Edmund Blackadder (Blackadder); 4. David Brent (The Office); 5. Larry David (Curb Your Enthusiasm); 6. Ali G (The 11 O'Clock Show/Da Ali G Show); 7. Edina Monsoon (Absolutely Fabulous); 8. Papa Lazarou (The League of Gentlemen); 9. Norman Stanley Fletcher (Porridge); 10. Tim Bisley (Spaced)
52	"Greatest Comedy Catchphrases"	Ardal O'Hanlon	4 January 2008	2.00
Top 10: 1. "Nice to see you, to see you ... nice!" (The Generation Game); 2. "Am I bovvered?" (The Catherine Tate Show); 3. "I don't believe it!" (One Foot in the Grave); 4. "Suit you sir!" (The Fast Show); 5. "And now for something completely different." (Monty Python's Flying Circus); 6. "Drink, Feck, Arse!" (Father Ted); 7. "Is it cos I'm black?" (The 11 O'Clock Show); 8. "Yeah, but, no, but..." (Little Britain); 9. "Cha'mone Motherfucker!" (Bo' Selecta!); 10. "This is a local shop" (The League of Gentlemen)
53	"50 Greatest Pop Videos"	Kimberley Walsh	16 May 2010	N/A
Top 10: 1. "Thriller" – Michael Jackson; 2. "Toxic" – Britney Spears; 3. "Rock DJ" – Robbie Williams; 4. "Virtual Insanity" – Jamiroquai; 5. "Single Ladies (Put a Ring on It)" – Beyoncé; 6. "Weapon of Choice" – Fatboy Slim; 7. "Poker Face" – Lady Gaga; 8. "Take On Me" – A-ha; 9. "Vogue" – Madonna; 10. "Like a Prayer" – Madonna
54	"100 Greatest Toys"	Jonathan Ross	19 December 2010	2.63
Top 10: 1. Lego; 2. Monopoly; 3. Dungeons & Dragons; 4. Wii; 5. Nintendo consoles 6. PlayStation consoles 7. Scrabble; 8. Scalextric; 9. Trivial Pursuit; 10. Game Boy
55	"50 Funniest Moments of 2010"	Matt Berry	21 January 2011	N/A
Top 10: 1. Paul the Octopus; 2. Gillian Cooke's Lycra suit splits 3. Bigotgate; 4. Parasailing donkey in Russia; 5. Gillian McKeith on I'm a Celebrity...Get Me Out of Here!; 6. Mary Bale puts a cat in a wheelie bin 7. Wayne Rooney's threesome with Helen Wood and Jennifer Thompson; 8. Ann Widdecombe on Strictly Come Dancing; 9. Eruptions of Eyjafjallajökull; 10. Wrong winner read out on Australia's Next Top Model
56	"50 Greatest Wedding Shockers"	Tom Allen	23 April 2011	N/A
Top 10 Missing
57	"100 Greatest Gadgets"	Stephen Fry	29 August 2011	2.22
Top 10: 1. Lighter; 2. Wristwatch; 3. iPod; 4. Television; 5. Typewriter; 6. Laptop; 7. Home phone 8. Pen; 9. Apple peeler 10. iPad
58	"Channel 4's 30 Greatest Comedy Shows"	Sharon Horgan	25 August 2012	N/A
Top 10: 1. Father Ted; 2. Peep Show; 3. The IT Crowd; 4. Black Books; 5. The Inbetweeners; 6. Spaced; 7. Green Wing; 8. Brass Eye; 9. Phoenix Nights; 10. Da Ali G Show
59	"50 Funniest Moments of 2012"	Matt Berry	28 December 2012	1.71
Top 10 Missing
60	"50 Funniest Moments of 2013"	Matt Berry	28 December 2013	1.67
Top 10: 1. Harlem Shake; 2. Miley Cyrus's video for "Wrecking Ball"; 3. Horse meat scandal 4. Dogging Tales; 5. Directioners rage Twitter war on GQ; 6. Russell Brand's acceptance speech at the GQ Men of the Year Awards; 7. Michael Douglas blames his throat cancer on oral sex 8. Miley Cyrus at the MTV Video Music Awards; 9. Kanye West; 10. Birth of Prince George
61	"50 Funniest Moments of 2014"	Matt Berry	27 December 2014	1.20
Top 10 Missing
62–63	"Britain's Best Loved Sitcoms"	Tamsin Greig	3 October 2015 (part one); 10 October 2015 (part two)	0.95 (part two)
Top 10: 1. Only Fools and Horses; 2. Fawlty Towers; 3. Blackadder; 4. One Foot in the Grave; 5. Porridge; 6. Father Ted; 7. The Vicar of Dibley; 8. Open All Hours; 9. Men Behaving Badly; 10. Mrs. Brown's Boys
