= Does exactly what it says on the tin =

English phrase

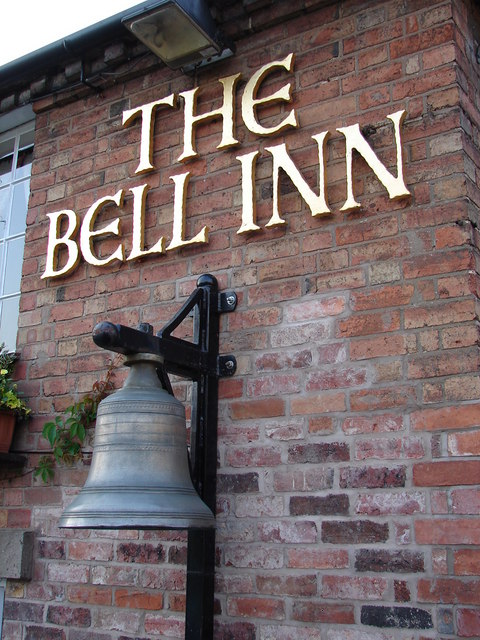
The Bell Inn (Welford-on-Avon, England) is an aptly named inn with a bell.

"Does exactly what it says on the tin" (sometimes simply "Does what it says") is a common British idiom used to describe a product, service or item that performs exactly as described by its name, description or slogan. It is similar in meaning to the expressions "by name and by nature" and "it lives up to its name".

The phrase originated as an advertising slogan used by British wood stain and wood dye manufacturer Ronseal. It was introduced in a series of television advertisements beginning in 1994 promoting Ronseal's Quick Drying Woodstain, which was stated to be "Woodstain that dries quickly". The phrase quickly entered common usage in the United Kingdom and later other Commonwealth countries. As of 2021, Ronseal continues to use the slogan in advertising and online media.

The slogan was created by Liz Whiston and Dave Shelton at the London advertising agency HHCL. The idea of the phrase was to emphasise that the company's products would act and last for the amount of time exactly as described on the tin can. The word tin is generally used even when the product is sold in a different type of container, although box is also sometimes used. The expression soon entered common usage in the UK. The phrase is a registered trademark of the Sherwin-Williams Company, the owner of Ronseal, across the European Community for products including paints, varnishes, and wood preservatives (E3085826).

In 2004, toothpaste manufacturer Colgate began a similar copycat advertising campaign in Ireland stating that its product "does exactly what it says on the tube".

== Cultural references ==
In 2007, a song titled "What It Says on the Tin" was released by the British singer Katie Melua. Although the song is about relationships, the phrase has a similar meaning.

In New Doctor Who Season 1, Bad Wolf, Captain Jack Harkness asks, "What's a defabricator?" and when it makes his clothing vanish, remarks, "Does exactly what it says on the tin."

== See also ==
- WYSIWYG (What You See Is What You Get)
