= Ronseal =

British wood paint manufacturer

Sherwin-Williams Diversified Brands Ltd
- Company type: Subsidiary
- Founded: 1956
- Headquarters: Chapeltown, Sheffield, England
- Products: Wood stain, paint and preservative
- Owner: Sherwin-Williams
- Website: www.ronseal.com

Ronseal is a British wood stain, paint and preservative manufacturer, known for the phrase "Does exactly what it says on the tin". The advertising slogan, which was created by agency HHCL, has since entered popular culture.

The company is based in Chapeltown, Sheffield, and has been owned by Sherwin-Williams since 1997.

== History ==
Ronuk Limited was founded by Horace Fowler as a polish manufacturing company in Portslade, Brighton in 1896. In 1956, the company launched into the DIY market with Ronseal – Floor and Wood Seal. In 1960, Ronuk was purchased by Izal, itself owned by the Newton Chambers Group in Sheffield.

In 1964, the company moved to Chapeltown, Sheffield, where it still resides today. Known as Roncraft, it became a separate sales division of Izal in 1970 and was bought three years later by Sterling Drug.

In 1989, Sterling was bought by Eastman Kodak until the multinational photographic company sold all of its do it yourself business to the New York‍–‍based investment bank Forstmann Little & Co. in 1994. Forstmann Little & Co. included Ronseal within its Thompson Minwax Holding Corp. business, which it sold in 1997 to Sherwin-Williams.

Sherwin-Williams purchased the Polish woodcare company Altax in February 2009, and integrated it into the Ronseal unit.
