= St George (advertisement) =

British TV commercial for soft drink (released 1966)

- Agency: HHCL + partners
- Client: Britvic
- Language: English
- Running time: 90 seconds
- Product: Tango Blackcurrant
- Release date: 1 October 1996 (television)
- Directed by: Colin Gregg
- Music by: Felix ("Don't You Want Me")
- Starring: Ray Gardner
- Production company: Eclipse
- Produced by: Anthony Taylor
- Country: United Kingdom
- Budget: £400,000 (campaign)

St George is a television commercial for the British soft drink, Blackcurrant Tango. The commercial was created by Chas Bayfield and Jim Bolton at the UK advertising agency, HHCL + Partners and was directed by Colin Gregg at the production company Eclipse for the client David Atter at Britvic.

The advertisement was Tango's biggest advertisement to date, and with most of its budget being spent on production as opposed to airtime, the advert only appeared on national television ten times, mostly in advert breaks during the Channel 4 series TFI Friday. This unusual scheduling idea was deemed groundbreaking. The advert won several major advertising awards in 1997, notably a Cannes Gold Lion and a Silver Pencil from D&AD in London. It has been voted one of the 100 best commercials of all time and was popular for its latent jingoism and the fact that it appears to have been filmed in one continuous shot.

The advert also saw the re-release of "Don't You Want Me" by Felix, which features in the advert, as a CD and cassette release, which also featured the Tango Blackcurrant logo. It reached number 17 in the UK Singles Chart.

== Sequence ==
St George opens with Tango spokesman Ray Gardner in his office in the headquarters of Tango. He appears to be doing a corporate video. He has a letter in his hand from a French exchange student, Sebastien Loyes, who is critical of new blackcurrant flavoured Tango. Ray addresses Sebastien's criticism in what begins as a mutual retort before slowly developing into a full-on rant. Ray walks forward, bumping into the camera before continuing his rant through the office. He is joined by some colleagues who follow him out into the car park where, now in full flow, he begins stripping off. Ray is joined by more staff who help him off with the rest of his clothes, revealing some bright purple boxing shorts under his trousers. Ray and his entourage arrive seamlessly on the White Cliffs of Dover where a flag-waving army of supporters have gathered to cheer on their leader. The commercial is now fully widescreen and the action is accompanied by rousing anthemic dance music - "Don't You Want Me" by Felix. As they help him into some purple boxing gloves and place a purple cloak around his shoulders, Ray continues his rant against Sebastien. On the edge of the cliffs is a boxing ring which Ray climbs into, before challenging Sebastian, France, Europe and the world to a fight. In the sky behind him, three Harrier jump jets appear and tilt menacingly.

== Production ==
=== Background and conception ===
Since 1992, London-based advertising agency HHCL + Partners had created each advertisement for the different variants and flavours of Tango, owned by Britvic, beginning with the Orange Man advertisement for the orange flavour. Several of the agency's advertisements for the brand had proven controversial, but by 1994, the brand's ongoing "You Know When You've Been Tango'd" campaign had helped Tango double its share on the soft drinks market. The campaign had finished in 1995 when Tango focused on individual advertising for its different flavours. Each flavour was now being advertised with its own campaigns and distinct identities; advertisements for the Orange flavour were largely put on hold whilst Tango Apple advertisements involved imbibers' bizarre sexual fetishes for the product, Tango Lemon advertisements featured the product as the euphoric, ritualistic drink of a fictional cult worshipping their god, Jim, whilst advertisements for the "Still Tango" variant warned viewers that the variant was unofficial and that viewers should call a number given on screen, only for callers to be greeted with the news that it was a trick.

When Tango Blackcurrant launched as the fourth official flavour of Tango in 1995–96, an advertisement for the flavour entitled Trade was created in which Britvic's National Sales Manager Nigel Harrison announces several promotional tie-ins, but which are then denounced by his colleague Sunhil Patel because "this stuff will sell itself anyway". Nonetheless it is disputed whether the advertisement was ever aired, and in early 1996, Tango began planning for their re-launch in July 1996 with a new logo; the planning included "re-launching" Tango Blackcurrant with a brand new advertisement, introducing not just the flavour's new logo but indeed widening knowledge of the flavour itself; the plan effectively rendered Trade a standalone advertisement.

"This is Tango's biggest commercial. The biggest one they've ever made."

— Director Colin Gregg speaking about St George in The Making of Blackcurrant Tango.

Continuing their focus on instigating advertisements for flavours of Tango other than Orange, David Atter of Britvic re-hired HHLC + Partners to create the new Tango Blackcurrant advertisement. The original plan was to create a commercial that was only 30 seconds long and was intended to be an attack on Coca-Cola, who had dominated the soft drinks market. The advertisement soon evolved into the radically different St George, which they planned as a 90-second advertisement–the longest Tango advertisement so far–which would not attack Coca-Cola but instead present the drink as very "British" and present another confrontational style of advertising the product. The decision to make the advertisement longer came from both Tango's desire to surprise its customers and because the only soft drink brand that could afford to do such a long commercial was Coca-Cola. Using a majority of the advertisement's budget on the production (rather than airtime) and only airing it 10 times was a risk that Tango believed was worth taking. HHCL hired television actor Ray Gardner to play a fictionalized version of himself in the advertisement, having worked with him previously when he played the character of Marshall in a 1995 HHCL-created advertisement for the Automobile Association.

=== Production ===
St George was written by Chas Bayfield and Jim Bolton, directed by television drama director Colin Gregg and produced by production company Eclipse on a total campaign budget of £400,000, which remains the largest budget for a Tango advertisement to date. Nonetheless, The Independent reported the budget to be £500,000. The whole advertising campaign was £5m.

The main actor was aged 42, of Herdsham Road, in Walton on Thames in Surrey. He attended LAMDA, and the Guildford School of Acting, leaving in 1979.

The commercial was filmed over only three days in April 1996. The office section was shot in a new high rise development overlooking East Croydon railway station, the car park was the Tesco Head Office in Welwyn Garden City. The infamous scene on the White Cliffs was filmed at St Margaret's at Cliffe, Kent on Thursday 11 April 1996, with Minnie Moll from HHCL, and extras from the amateur dramatic groups in the local area.

Gregg explained that the White Cliffs were chosen as a filming location because "what more British location can you have than the White Cliffs of Dover?" Ray's office and the White Cliffs were filmed first and the car park sequence was shot to link the two together. Ringcraft Boxing Ring Hire Specialists built the boxing ring used in the advertisement. The flag-wielding extras in Gardner's entourage recorded their chants separately on the same day in the same field. During production of St George, Barth Hulley, who produced the advertisement, also duly shot and directed The Making of Blackcurrant Tango, a fifteen-minute "making-of" video. Hulley's brief stated that the making-of video was required in order to be supplied to his client.

The style of St George gradually changes from an amateurish corporate video-style piece into an epic, cinematic widescreen piece whilst Gardner is running towards the White Cliffs with his growing entourage. There are several tricks in St George to give the illusion that it was filmed in one take; Gardner moves from a 20th storey office to the ground floor, then to the office car park and the White Cliffs, all apparently in one take. In fact, Gardner passes a white wall on leaving his office and his position is matched exactly against a white wall on the ground floor. Similarly, Gardner’s position as he passes a Tango truck in the car park had to be replicated exactly to match his actions as he passes the truck on the White Cliffs. The usage of music in the advertisement–an unfinished remix of Felix's "Don't You Want Me"–marked the first time since 1991, and the first time since HHCL began creating Tango advertisements, that a Tango commercial featured a musical soundtrack. (Note: St George was also the first Tango advertisement to use commercially available music since a 1988 commercial featuring "Apache" by The Shadows.)

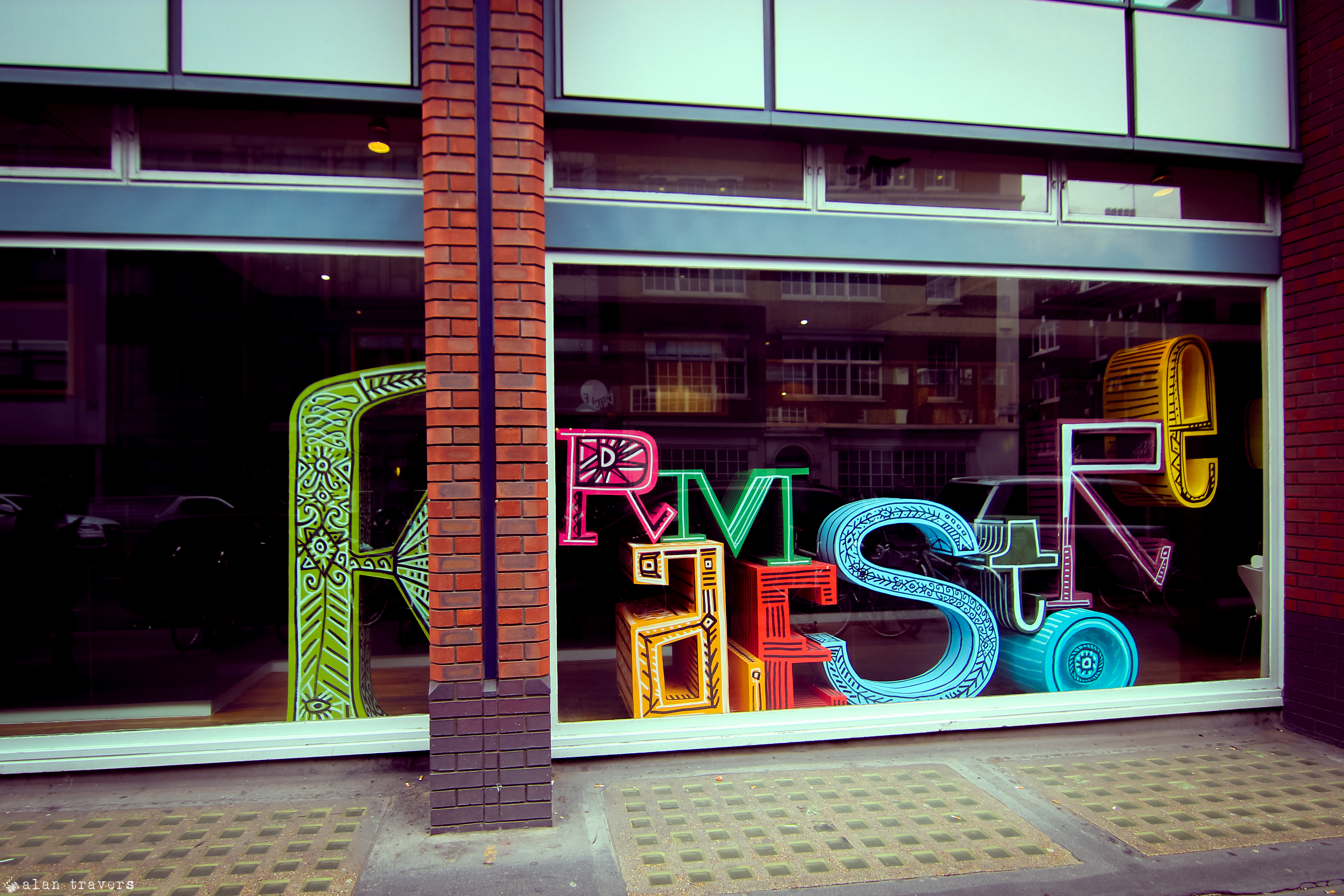
Framestore CFC (offices pictured) provided computer generated effects.

There were several problems during production; Gardner needed to step out of his trousers as he leaves the building, something which needed nearly thirty takes to get right, and Gregg cancelled his idea for Gardner to start running after taking a sip of Tango Blackcurrant because it implies the drink has given him energy. Production was not helped by how the fact that on the first two days of filming, the weather was fine but on the third, it snowed. Due to health and safety regulations, the crew were not allowed to use real Harrier jets on the day–the planes were computer generated afterwards by the digital visual effects company, Framestore CFC.

Unlike many television advertisements, St George does not feature a slogan, nor indeed is the Tango logo ever superimposed on the screen in its final moments; however, St George is not free of Tango branding: The Tango offices depicted in St George suitingly features numerous staff members from Britvic, as well as several Tango branded items, such as the "Tango doll"–taken from a 1995 campaign, a Tango Blackcurrant vending machine, a Still Tango poster and a Tango door sticker, whilst outside the offices is a Tango sign Tango Blackcurrant delivery lorry, and later on in the advertisement, Gardner's entourage Tango Blackcurrant flags whilst Gardner himself wears a Tango-branded boxing shorts and cape, whose Tango logo was stitched on the day of filming.

== Broadcast ==
St George premièred on British television on 1 October 1996. As the majority of the advertisement's budget was put into production instead of airtime, St George only ever aired on television ten times, mostly during advert breaks during the Channel 4 series TFI Friday; one commentary later clarified that St George aired once a week for six weeks during TFI Friday. Public relations firm Freud Communications worked with Britvic in publicising St George by making "a celebrity" out of the otherwise unknown Ray Gardner, arranging for him to be interviewed on television and in the newspapers. David Atter, international marketing manager for Tango, explained to PR Week that "as a youth product, Blackcurrant Tango was particularly adaptable and flexible. We didn’t need to have a well-known celebrity to reach our audience." Scheduling the commercial in advert breaks of TFI Friday alone was considered unusual, even revolutionary, at the time. The idea came from George Michaelides of Michaelides & Bednash. Vizeum UK's joint managing director, Matt Andrews, considered Michaelides to be a worthy candidate for a legacy prize at the 2006 Channel 4 TV Planning Awards, citing his scheduling idea for the advertisement as a reason. Andrews explained:

"Previously, it had been all about ratings. He pioneered the use of bespoke and qualitative research to understand what people were really engaging with. For instance, on the launch of Blackcurrant Tango, they advertised in only one programme - TFI Friday. To go to an advertiser and tell them they were only going to be in one show was, at the time, very brave. But the awareness tracking they got for the ratings they bought was amazing. It blew all preconceptions away."

An unreleased and unfinished remix of hardbag musician Felix's 1992 song "Don't You Want Me" features in St George; by the time of the broadcast of the advertisement, the remix had been updated to become the "'96 Pugilist Mix", featuring samples of Ray Gardner's dialogue from the advertisement. This version was released as a single on 4 October 1996 by Deconstruction Records on CD, cassette and purple-coloured seven-inch vinyl to coincide with the Tango Blackcurrant and St George launch. The single features the Tango Blackcurrant logo several times in its packaging, and reached number 17 on the UK Singles Chart in October 1996. In the remix's music video, the St George samples were modified to remove mentions of Tango Blackcurrant, but the original version later featured on the hits compilation Hits 97. On 13 October, the campaign continued when customers who bought the Sunday Mail at branches of Esso Snack & Shop were each given a free can of Tango Blackcurrant.

== Reception ==
St George was an instant critical and commercial success. Peter York of The Independent stated that "the launch of Blackcurrant Tango provides the opportunity for a fizzy drink to make a unique political statement - indeed an intervention. The European Movement will no doubt object strenuously." He noted the advertisement's diversion from the norm, saying "Ray displays a patriotic body of a kind never normally seen in TV commercials: white, with a proudly cantilevered beer-belly and two pendulous crescent breastettes. British as they come, the Ray Gardner body speaks for pork pies, British lager, and full-cream dairy products. It defies gymnasia and sunbathing." He called it "a simply brilliant launch".

In 1997, the Institute of Contemporary Arts included it in their Assuming Positions exhibition. The exhibit examined how art could be created from a number of unexpected sources. Kate Bush, curator of the exhibition, said St George was used because it was "technically brilliant as well as self-knowing": "It starts off dull and builds to a wonderful cinematic climax. You could read it as real laddishness and repugnant xenophobia, but at the same time you known it knows all that about itself and is a parody. This helps it transcend being an advert and becomes art." Mike Cozens, creative director of Young & Rubicam, praised the advertisement and said "it's been a great hit with punters as well as with advertising juries, which doesn't always follow. It's good to see such a mainstream brand like this winning awards for its advertising; it's often more obscure brands that win, which is sometimes questionable."

Impressed with Gardner's performance in St George, the advertisement's producer Barth Hulley asked him to star in his short film Up and Running. Despite St George's popularity in the public eye, it was also nonetheless controversial; it was also one of the top 10 most complained about adverts reported to the Independent Television Commission (ITC) in 1996, as 68 complainants citied it as 'insulting and xenophobic'. The ITC dismissed the complaints, characterising the humour as harmless and likening it to what viewers might see on Fawlty Towers. Letters of complaint from French exchange students who did not see the humour in the advertisement were ridiculed in newspaper inserts.

=== Accolades ===
St George was a major success in the industry and won a string of awards. A year after its premiere, Paul McCann of The Independent said that St George "has won nearly every advertising award in Britain." In March 1997, St George won HHCL Partners the British Creative Circle award for best advertisement of the year. The commercial, which was honoured in the platinum section, also won the gold award for best use of humour, as did its sister advert for Tango Apple. In May, St George won a D&AD "Silver Pencil" design award for best advert of the year, industry judges deeming it not quite good enough for a gold award. In June, St George won a Cannes "Gold Lion" award for being a top-tier advertisement, and in November 1997, St George was selected as the grand prize winner from among 7,000 entries from 78 countries at the London International Advertising Awards. It has also been listed on many industry "advert of the year" lists, and won the "ITV gold award" at the British Television Advertising Awards.

In later times, St George continued to receive acclaim. In as early as May 1997, St George was named "ad of the decade" in a survey of readers of Sky Magazine, beating Levi's 1995 Planet advertisement. It has been voted one of the 100 best commercials of all time. Bernice Kanner included St George in her 1999 list book 100 Best TV Commercials: And Why They Worked. It won the Film Four "Best Long Commercial 1956-2001" award in June 2007, whilst Gardner was honoured with the Channel 4 "Director's Cut" Gold Award that same summer, where the advertisement was awarded top honours in the "Vintage Category". Ray Gardner later won the "ITV Best Actor In A Commercial" Award for his performance. In 2008, advertising industry publication Campaign Live ranked St George at number 2 in their list of the "Top 10 Funniest TV Ads of All Time". In 2013, Ben Tollett and Emer Stamp, joint creative directors of Adam & Eve DDB, included the advert in his list of "3 Great Ads I Had Nothing to Do With", part of a series for Campaign Live.

At the turn of the millennium, the original Hooj-produced "Hooj Mix" version of "Don't You Want Me", which features in St George in an early variation of its specially created "'96 Pugilist Mix", was included on several commercially successful, TV-advertised British various artists compilation albums of popular music featured in acclaimed television advertisements, including Virgin Records' The Best TV Ads...Ever! (2000), which was part of The Best...Album in the World...Ever! compilation strand, and Telstar Records's Switched On: The Cool Sound of TV Advertising (2001). The compilations were both released on CD, with The Best TV Ads...Ever! also being released on cassette, and reached number 10 and 9 in the UK Compilation Chart respectively.

== Aftermath ==
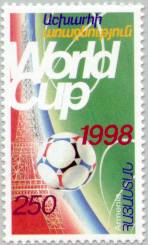
Ray Gardner later appeared in a FIFA World Cup 1998-tie-in Tango commercial.

Tango themselves parodied St George in a HHCL-created advertisement for the orange flavour entitled Vote Orange Tango. The advertisement, broadcast in March 1997 in the run up to the General Election, takes the form of a mock party political broadcast where a Tango Orange campaigner criticizes the Apple, Lemon and Blackcurrant variants of the drink individually; his remarks against the blackcurrant flavour see him walk to the roof of a building where the character of Ray Gardner (portrayed by an actor other than Gardner) is still shown expressing his anger against Sebastian, but is clearly exhausted, and ultimately falls into a puddle. The spokesperson criticizes "Blackcurrant Tango" as "stinky wind" and "lets off" an inflatable Ray Gardner. The advertisement was broadcast in the first ever advert break on Channel 5.

Despite his ties to the blackcurrant flavour, Gardner himself later appeared in two advertisements for the orange flavour. The first of these advertisements, Clowns, aired between late 1997 and early 1998 and showed him encouraging a colleague at an event where clowns were being run over by giant trucks. The advertisement was released to promote the send-away Tango Horn toy, but Tango themselves appeared to deem the advert a failure when a further advertisement in early 1998 humorously dismissed the advert as such. Gardner's second Tango Orange advertisement aired in mid-1998 during the 1998 FIFA World Cup and showed Gardner advertising a competition to win television sets as part of the brand's World Cup promotions. He sported the same uniform as in the start of St George. Additionally, Gardner appeared in several wraparound stings (break bumpers) during ITV's coverage of the World Cup where he is shown exploring Paris between games, although these stings do not feature Tango branding.

Despite the success of St George, there were no further advertisements for Tango Blackcurrant, and the flavour was discontinued after several years. Post-St George Tango advertising prior to 2000 focused mainly on the Tango brand as a whole or on the orange and diet orange flavours, and the blackcurrant variant was dropped before their more eclectic advertising would return in the millennium. Tango Blackcurrant was relaunched as an Asda-exclusive flavour in August 2011 and as a standard flavour in December 2012. Nonetheless, St George remains the final advertisement for the drink, with Tango having seldom advertised on television in the 2010s.

== See also ==
- Orange Man (advertisement)
- Pipes (advertisement)
