= Trevor Robinson (advertising) =

Trevor Robinson, OBE is a creative director and founder of Quiet Storm, the London-based advertising agency and production company. A dedicated philanthropist, he heads a drive to encourage the UK's creative industries to embrace those, who like him, come from ethnic minority backgrounds.

After studying art at Chelsea College of Art and at Hounslow College, Robinson entered the field of advertising. At HHCL & Partners, Robinson created the award-winning Orange Tango campaign (voted the UK's third most popular ad of all time by Channel 4 viewers). He followed this with campaigns for Apple Tango, Martini and Golden Wonder Pots. During this time Robinson started directing TV commercials.

In 1995 Robinson branched out on his own. He set up Quiet Storm, the UK's first and only joint creative agency and production company, being recognised members of both the Institute of Practitioners in Advertising (IPA) and APA. The agency's client list includes COI, Kerry Foods, MTV, VIVA and HMV, as well as campaigns for Operation Black Vote and Mayoral conferences for the Greater London Authority. Robinson is Chair of the IPA Ethnic Diversity Forum.

Frustrated by the lack of opportunities open to young people from the kind of background he had, Robinson founded Create Not Hate in 2007. Aimed at kids affected by gang-related violence, the purpose of Create Not Hate is to give those who might never otherwise be exposed to the creative industries an opportunity to demonstrate their own creative solutions to the issue of gun and knife crime. Create Not Hate generated A Mother's Tear, a short film written by two 15-year-old boys from Lambeth Academy, which was shown nationwide in cinemas, on the Community Channel TV station and on MTV. It also received extensive global press (from Sky News to news channels in Japan and Germany).

In 2009, Robinson was awarded an OBE by the Queen for his services to UK advertising.
