= Pipes (advertisement) =

2004 British television commercial

- Client: Britvic
- Language: English
- Running time: 30 seconds
- Product: Tango Orange
- Release date: October 2004 (television)
- Country: United Kingdom
- Preceded by: Seal
- Followed by: Metaphor

Pipes is a television advertisement in the United Kingdom for Tango Orange, which first aired in October 2004.

The advertisement was in the "You Know When You've Been Tango'd" campaign for the drink, which was revived in 2002. The thirty second clip shows a man wrapped in a carpet filled with oranges, balanced on top of five concrete pipes, with both the carpet and pipes attached to a string, which at the other end was attached to a goat.

The goat is shown eating the grass, it then moves to the next sheet, which then pulls the string, thus causing the string to be broken and the carpet and pipes roll down a hill, until they hit a tree, with the man still inside, followed by the five concrete pipes quickly running into the carpet. The man crawls out the carpet as the "commentator" describes the event as "the hit of the whole fruit".

On 11 November 2004, Remembrance Day, the Advertising Standards Authority Watchdog banned the advertisement. The watchdog took the rare step of acting before a formal decision was reached on whether the advert, for Tango, had breached industry rules. The watchdog, which received four complaints, feared children could copy the commercial and harm themselves.

This meant that considered re runs of the adverts in the beginning of 2005 were cancelled.

Despite the immediate ban, the Broadcast Advertising Clearance Centre said it "strongly disagreed" that it could lead to accidents. The disagreement came less than a month after the ASA took control for regulating broadcast advertising where previously it covered non broadcast only. The BACC said it was "surreal" by its nature because it featured a man wrapped in a carpet filled with oranges. They went on to state;

"The advert was not set on a building site or in any realistic setting that would suggest that the stunt was able to be copied or would normalise or condone the behaviour"

Britvic, which makes Tango, apologised for any offence caused by the advert, and promised not to show it again. In July 2013, Womborse ranked the advert at #5 in their list "Banned: 7 of the Most Controversial Ads", whilst in February 2014, The Mirror included it in their unordered list of "The 10 Most Controversial Commercials".

== See also ==
- Orange Man (advertisement), an earlier advertisement for the drink that was banned
- St George (advertisement)
