= Graham Harding =

British professor and neurophysiologist

Graham Frederick Anthony Harding (19 March 1937 – 20 October 2018) of Aston University was the first professor of clinical neurophysiology in the United Kingdom. He was the first to recognise that television broadcasts and video games could trigger epilepsy. The Harding test was named after him.
