= Harding test =

Test for photosensitive epilepsy in media

The term Harding test is generically understood to mean an automatic test for photosensitive epilepsy (PSE), triggered by provocative image sequences in television content. This is properly known as a PSE test since the publication of the Digital Production Partnership (DPP) technical requirements and the DPP PSE Devices document (in the UK) updated in November 2018.

The Harding Flash and Pattern Analyser (FPA) is proprietary software that is used to analyse video content for flashing and stationary patterns which may cause harm to those who suffer from photosensitive epilepsy. It is an implementation of the guidelines set by the regulator Ofcom in the UK largely based on the findings by Graham Harding, a professor at Aston University. It is available in both tape-based and file-based versions, allowing video streams from SDI, composite, component, HDMI, and files to all be analysed, in resolutions up to 8k. Versions for both Microsoft Windows and Apple mac-IOS are available. There are other manufacturers of similar and different solutions available which are also approved on the DPP Devices list.

== Photosensitive epilepsy ==
Photosensitive epilepsy affects approximately one in 4,000 people and is a form of epilepsy in which seizures are triggered by visual stimuli that form patterns in time or space, such as flashing lights, bold regular patterns, or regular moving patterns. In 1993, an advert for Pot Noodles induced seizures in three people in the United Kingdom, leading to the then regulator the ITC introducing these guidelines.

The Broadcast Code of Advertising Practice requires that TV ads are tested and pass a PSE Test. Companies such as Clearcast, are responsible for clearing ads for UK commercial broadcasters and will perform a PSE check on all ads before clearance.

== Testing procedures ==
The algorithms behind PSE testing look at video frames from second to second and analyse for potentially provocative image sequences. Luminance flashes, red flashes and spatial patterns over prescribed amplitude and frequency limits are then logged. Any such over limit violations give rise to the media being failed. Otherwise the media is passed fit for broadcast and a pass certificate can be automatically generated.

The first PSE test was developed by Cambridge Research Systems Ltd. and are based on research by Graham Harding. All Harding FPA products implement the same guidelines. There are also other approved manufacturers' products which either use the same algorithm in different packages or have independently developed software and algorithms that broadly provide PSE checks to the same specifications.

The PSE testing is currently used by all television stations in the UK to check for compliance with the guidelines. If a program fails, it usually requires a re-editing of offending scenes. Normally, problems can be rectified by reducing the number of flashes in the scene and/or reducing the intensity of colors (most notably saturated red). After re-editing the problem areas, the entire program must be re-tested in order to obtain a PSE test certificate. PSE testing is also used in Japan, particularly for anime content on both broadcast TV and online streaming platforms, following the Pokémon Shock incident in 1997.
