= HHCL =

Advertising agency in London

- Formerly: Howell Henry Chaldecott Lury and Partners
- Industry: Advertising agency
- Founded: 17 October 1987; 38 years ago
- Founders: Rupert Howell; Steve Henry; Axel Chaldecott; Adam Lury; Robin Price
- Defunct: 2007
- Fate: Closed by WPP plc
- Headquarters: London, England, United Kingdom
- Parent: Chime Communications Limited

HHCL (formally Howell Henry Chaldecott Lury and Partners) was an advertising agency based in London. The agency devised campaigns for Tango, including the Orange Man commercial in 1991, and St George, for Blackcurrant Tango, in 1997. In 1994, it created the Does exactly what it says on the tin campaign for Ronseal.

The firm was voted 'Agency of the Decade' by Campaign magazine in 2000. After mergers and a name change to United London, the agency closed in the beginning of 2007.

== History ==
Howell Henry Chaldecott Lury & Partners was founded by Rupert Howell, Steve Henry, Axel Chaldecott, Adam Lury and Robin Price and launched on October 17, 1987.

HHCL was bought by Chime PLC in October 1997, and merged into the Red Cell Network in January 2002. The HHCL initials were dropped and the agency became United London in January 2006, before being closed down by its owner WPP Group in the beginning of 2007.

== Philosophy ==
HHCL believed that the quality of a company's communications could lead to a real competitive advantage and produced a book written by Adam Lury: Marketing at a Point of Change which expounded this view. HHCL regarded themselves as professional radicals—a positioning later applied to the agency as a whole.

== Campaigns ==
In the early nineties, the agency created commercials for Maxell cassettes using commonly misheard lyrics shot in the style of the video for Subterranean Homesick Blues by Bob Dylan.

HHCL devised a commercial for Tango in 1991, in which a young man drinks some Tango, and a large orange man then runs up to him and slaps him on the face while two astounded commentators report on the action. The commercial was voted the third best commercial of all time by Channel 4 in the United Kingdom. After children began copying the orange man's slap, the commercial was banned and re-shot with the orange man planting a kiss on the Tango drinker. Despite the controversy, The Orange Man advertising campaign was very successful at raising Tango's sales and profile.

In 1994, the agency rebranded the vehicle breakdown service The Automobile Association as The Fourth Emergency Service, and was responsible for the line 'It does exactly what it says on the tin' for Ronseal. In October 1996, HHCL created the commercial St George for Blackcurrant Tango. The commercial was voted one of the 100 best commercials of all time.

In 1997, HHCL and the brand consultancy, Wolff Olins jointly launched the airline, Go. In August 2000, Time Computer Systems handed its advertising account to HHCL, which saw the end of the adverts featuring Leonard Nimoy of Star Trek.

In 2002, a campaign created by HHCL for Easynet's broadband services showed both male and female bosses punching their employees for wasting company money. The Advertising Standards Authority banned these adverts ruling that they could cause serious or widespread offence, and that they condoned violence and anti-social behaviour.
