= Campaign (magazine) =

Global advertising business magazine

- Cover of the Campaign UK print version. 20 November 2015
- Editor: Claire Beale
- Frequency: Weekly (1968 to September 2017), then monthly (September 2017 to date)
- First issue: 12 September 1968
- Company: Haymarket Business Media
- Country: United Kingdom
- Based in: London
- Language: English
- Website: campaignlive.com (en-US) campaignlive.co.uk (en-GB)
- ISSN: 0008-2309

Campaign is a global business magazine covering advertising, media, marketing and commercial creativity. Headquartered in the UK, it also has editions in the US, Asia-Pacific, India, the Middle East and Turkey.

Campaign is published by Haymarket Media Group, which owns more than 70 brands worldwide, including Autocar, What Car? and PRWeek.

== Overview ==
Campaign publishes a monthly print magazine in the UK as well as daily news and analysis on its websites: campaignlive.co.uk, campaignlive.com, campaignasia.com, campaignindia.in, campaignme.com, and campaigntr.com.

Each spring Campaign releases its School Reports, an assessment of how the biggest advertising agencies performed over the past year. In December, as part of its Annual issue, it names the top agencies, advertising and media networks, advertisers, campaigns, media, and production companies of the year. Campaign also publishes the A-List, a directory of leading executives from the advertising and media industries, at the end of each year.

== History ==
The magazine was originally published by the British Printing Corporation and titled World's Press News, and, in the late 1960s, was struggling to find a market, but Michael Heseltine then acquired it for Haymarket and hired Roland Schenk to redesign it. On its relaunch, it was an immediate success and became known as "the Bible of British adland". Its first issue under Haymarket appeared on 12 September 1968.

In 2013, Campaign underwent a redesign, dropping its A3 newspaper-size format. In the same year it also launched its first paid-for app, which readers receive as part of their subscription, on the Apple Newsstand service.

In May 2016, Haymarket Business Media consolidated their marketing communications publishing portfolio under the Campaign brand, leading to the closure of Marketing Magazine, Brand Republic, and Media Week. Media Week was previously publishing physical magazines when it was first launched 1985 and turned into an online-only publication in 2009 during a restructuring by Haymarket. The May 2016 consolidation also saw the launch of another Haymarket specialist job board, Campaign Jobs.

== Campaign awards ==
The Campaign Big Awards recognize the best agencies, campaigns and creative work of the year. The Campaign Media Awards celebrate creativity in the media business, with categories for both media agencies and media owners.
