= Tango (drink) =

British fruit-flavoured soft drink brand

- Two cans of Tango in its best known flavours, Apple and Orange
- Type: Carbonated soft drink
- Manufacturer: Carlsberg Britvic
- Origin: United Kingdom
- Introduced: 1958
- Variants: Tango Ice Blast (Slush), and multiple flavours
- Website: https://tango.co.uk/

Tango is a British carbonated soft drink brand owned and manufactured by Carlsberg Britvic subsidiary Britvic, primarily marketed in Britain and Ireland. The drink is made and sold in various flavours consisting of real fruit, such as orange, apple, cherry or mango. The Tango brand has also been extended into slushies (Tango Ice Blast) and non-drink products like bonbon sweets.

Tango was launched as an orangeade drink in April 1958 by Porth-based Corona Soft Drinks. Tango differentiated from regular Corona with the addition of real fruit and was sweetened with real sugar. The Beecham Group bought Corona and hence the Tango product in September 1958. Since October 1986, Tango has been owned by Britvic, which since 2025 has been merged with Carlsberg Group.

The brand has been well known for its viral marketing approach, especially humorous adverts broadcast on television in Britain in the 1990s from the Howell Henry Chaldecott Lury advertising agency. Tango's politically incorrect ad campaigns have earned both praise for its humour as well as complaints.

== Packaging ==
Like most other soft drinks, the packaging and logo design of Tango has changed and evolved multiple times. For limited edition variations of Tango, special packaging has sometimes been produced for them. Notably, the "Tango Talk" rebrand of Tango Orange and Tango Apple in 2001 featured a mobile phone in place of the flavour representation featured on regular versions of the flavours at the time. Tango have also released unusual packaging as part of their humorous marketing, for example upside-down labels on cans in May 2009 which was done after a dare.

In the beginning of 1996, Tango packaging changed, with the words "Tango" and the respective flavour written on something representing the drink (for example, an orange explosion for Tango Orange). In March 2001, Tango Orange was relaunched with a new pack design. This was followed in September 2001 for Tango Cherry and Tango Tropical. May 2009 saw new packaging created by Blue Marlin Brand Design. It featured mashed up images of fruit and graffiti style type.

During 2000, short lived 250ml bottles of Tango were introduced as part of a £42m campaign by Britvic, to market their drinks as being suitable for children's lunch boxes. The campaign also introduced the popular Robinson's line of juice drinks Fruit Shoot.

"Tango Orange Sound System: Official Can", a 2010 repackaging of the notably large "Tango with Added Tango Orange" featured speakers on the can, in place of the mashed-up fruit. Both these large cans were advertised as "the first time Tango cans are larger". This is not true, as from 1991 until roughly 2000, all Tango flavours could be purchased in similar size larger cans. The large cans, at the initial 1991 launch, were called "King-Size".

== Flavours ==
=== Original ===
Name	Year launched	Status	Notes
Tango Orange	1958	Active	The original variety; an Orange-flavoured soft drink. It has seen many different alterations and recipe changes throughout the years.
Tango Lemon	c. 1961	Discontinued	A Lemon-flavoured drink. This flavour was still being sold as of 2001, but is since no longer available.
Tango Grapefruit	c. 1975	Discontinued	A Grapefruit-flavoured drink.
Tango Lemon and Lime	c. 1975	Discontinued	A short-lived Lemon-Lime drink.
Tango Orange and Pineapple	1980s	Discontinued	An Orange and Pineapple-flavoured drink.
Tango Orange and Passionfruit	1980s	Discontinued	An Orange and Passionfruit-flavoured drink.
Tango Apple	1986	Active	An Apple-flavoured drink.
Tango Pineapple and Grapefruit/Tango Tropical	1987	Discontinued	A Pineapple and Grapefruit-flavoured drink. It was relaunched as Tropical Tango in 1999.
Tango Blackcurrant	1995; 2011	Discontinued	A Blackcurrant-flavoured drink. It is well known for the St George advert that promoted the drink. The drink was discontinued at the end of 1999, but was reintroduced in 2011.
Tango Cherry	1998, 2001	Discontinued, 2019	A Cherry-flavoured drink. It was initially introduced as a limited edition in 1998 before becoming a permanent edition in 2000.
Tango Fruit Fling	2003	Discontinued, 2006	An Orange, Pineapple and Passionfruit-flavoured variety. It suffered from low sales throughout its run and was discontinued by 2006.
Mango Tango	2005	Discontinued, 2005	A limited edition Mango-flavoured variety that was sold for the Summer of 2005. It was originally introduced to re-ignite interest in the brand.
Tango Aargh! Intense Citrus	2014	Discontinued, 2014	A citrus-flavoured drink. It was sold for a limited time for the summer of 2014.
Tango Blood Orange	2015	Discontinued	A Blood-orange flavoured variety.

=== Sugar Free ===
Name	Year launched	Status	Notes
Diet Tango Orange/Tango Orange No Added Sugar/Tango Orange Sugar Free	c. 1986; 2015	Active	A low-calorie Orange-flavoured drink. It was sold under many different names until being discontinued in the early-2010s. It was reintroduced in 2015, and was reformulated in 2019.
Diet Tango Orange and Pineapple	1986	Discontinued, 1989	A low-calorie Orange and Pineapple-flavoured drink.
Diet Tango Apple; Tango Apple Sugar Free	1989; 2022	Active	A low-calorie Apple-flavoured drink. It was initially discontinued in the early 2000s, but was reintroduced in 2022.
Diet Tango Lemon	1990	Discontinued, 1998	A low-calorie Lemon-flavoured drink.
Diet Tango Blackcurrant	1995	Discontinued, 1999	A low-calorie Blackcurrant-flavoured drink. It was introduced at the same time as the standard Blackcurrant Tango, but was eventually discontinued.
Tango Tropical Sugar Free	2019	Active	An Orange, Passionfruit, Mango and Pineapple-flavoured variety.
Tango Strawberry Watermelon Sugar Free	2019	Discontinued, 2022	A low-calorie Strawberry and Watermelon-flavoured variety.
Tango Dark Berry Sugar Free	2021	Discontinued, 2025	A low-calorie Berry-flavoured drink.
Tango Berry Peachy Sugar Free	2022	Discontinued, 2023	A low-calorie Peach and Raspberry flavoured-variety. It is the first in the "Tango Editions" series.
Tango Paradise Punch Sugar Free	2023	Discontinued, 2024	A low-calorie Orange, Mango and Tropical flavoured variety, and is the second in the "Tango Editions" series.
Tango Mango Sugar Free	2024	Active	A low-calorie Mango-flavoured variety, and is the third in the "Tango Editions" series.
Tango Raspberry Blast	2024	Active	A low-calorie Apple and Raspberry flavoured variety. Limited Edition.
Tango Cherry Blast	2024	Active	A low-calorie Apple and Cherry variety. Limited Edition.
Tango Cherry Sugar Free	2024	Active	A low-calorie Cherry-flavoured variety.
Tango Strawberry Smash Sugar Free	2025	Active	A low-calorie Strawberry and Pineapple flavoured variety and is the fourth in the "Tango Editions" series.
Tango Zero'd Thirst Trap	2026	Active	A low-calorie Peach, Orange and Pineapple flavoured variety, and is the fifth in the "Tango Editions" series.

== Variants and sub-brands ==
=== Still Tango ===
Still Tango was a selection of juice drinks, initially sold in Orange flavour. The drink's launch in June 1994 proved to be a disaster following reports of the drink fermenting on store shelves, leading to Britvic re-calling over a million bottles of the product.

The drink was relaunched in September 1995, with an advertising campaign focusing on a single newsagent in Dorking, Surrey. A fellow television advertising campaign in 1996 showcased the failed attempt at the drink's launch. and in May 1996, Apple, Lemon and Blackcurrant variants were introduced.

=== Tango Strange Soda ===
Tango Strange Soda was a sub-brand that consisted of juice and milk-based drinks, available in "Strange Strawberry" and "Odd Orange" flavours and marketed towards children and teenagers. The drink was put into development in 2000 and was initially announced as Freekin' Soda in late-2002 for a release within the start of 2003, but was pulled following concerns about the brand's name being unsuitable for the brand's target audience, and the word "Freekin" being linked as a milder alternative to a strong profanity, which would have made the drink unsuitable to be marketed on children's television channels at any time or any networks prior to the 9 pm Watershed.

The drink was eventually introduced under the modified name of Freekee Soda in February 2003; but suffered from low sales throughout its run. Due to a legal complaint over the trademark of the brand name and the initial low sales, it was relaunched under the Tango brand as Tango Strange Soda in September 2003.

Despite this move and a reduction of pricing, the drink continued to suffer from very low sales until Britvic announced the product's discontinuation in January 2004.

=== Tango Ice Blast ===
Tango Ice Blast is a slushie drink originally introduced in 2004. It is currently produced by Frozen Brothers (previously by Slush Puppie), under license from Britvic and has its own website separate from Tango, at lovetangoiceblast.com. The same company also produces Fanta Frozen, Coca-Cola Frozen and Slushy Jack's products.

As of 2024, its core range of flavours are: Blue Raspberry, Strawberry and Kiwi, Lemon, Cherry, Orange, and Bubblegum. Over the years, Tango Ice Blast has released many seasonal limited edition flavours. In 2015 these consisted of Citrus, Tropical, and Strawberry & Kiwi flavours. In 2016 they were Lemon Fizz, Pina Coco'lada, Pineapple, and Punchy Peach and Passionfruit. Other flavours have included Dark Cherry in 2015 (coincided with the release of Star Wars: The Last Jedi), Sour Watermelon in 2018, Peach & Pomegranate in 2019, and Bubblegum in 2023 (released to promote Wonka).

=== Tango Clear ===
Tango Clear was a brand of no-calorie clear drinks introduced in April 2005. It was another attempt by Britvic to increase sales of the Tango brand and was aimed at the young female market.

The Drink was initially introduced in Apple and Watermelon and Lemon and Kiwi flavours, and in 2006, the brand was expanded with two more flavours - Raspberry and White Cranberry, and Orange.

Tango Clear was discontinued in September 2007, after Britvic announced that they would strictly focus the Tango brand on its core flavours.

=== Tango Blast ===
Tango Blast is a brand of drinks introduced in initially as a limited edition in April 2024. Inspired by Tango Ice Blast, Tango Blast consists of Raspberry and Cherry flavours in a ready to drink format instead of slushies. In April 2025, Britvic announced that the drink will return for another limited run.

=== Other products ===
As well as drinks, the brand have also sold chocolate bars, chewy ball sweets and car air fresheners.

In October 2000, Cadbury announced they would team up with Britvic to create a limited edition Tango Orange-flavoured Crunchie.

In July 2011, Turbo Tango, when launched, was described as the "first aerosol drink".

During 2011, several flavours of Chew Stick and Chewy Bonbons were introduced. In January 2013, a Tango branded shower gel was launched. A Tango branded hand soap was also launched around the same time.

== Sponsorships ==
Tango sponsored the television show The Word in 1994 and the Underage Festival in 2010. The Launch Pad ride was previously sponsored by Tango and therefore renamed to the "Tango Ice Blast". Tango sponsored the public Christmas Lights in London in 1998. However there was criticism from the public that the resulting lights display was too commercial.

== Marketing and advertisement ==
Historically, slogans have included "You Taste the Tang in Tango Every Sparkling Sip You Take" in the 1960s and "The Whole Fruit" in the late 1980s.

During August 1999, Tango teamed up with the newspapers Daily Mail and Daily Record to extend their summer peak sales period in a campaign called "Tango Time". The main thread of the campaign activity was a competition where a time of day is printed on the base of cans of Tango. The winning 'Tango Time' was published in the Daily Mirror and Daily Record and winners invited to call a prize claim line. The newspaper adverts were trailed by branding on the front page, including a free offer for a bottle of Tango. The adverts containing the winning 'Tango Time' ran for twenty six days in August 1999.

Tango Apple has often been subject to experimental advertising including an "Apple Tango Calendar" given free in June 1996 with the Daily Star and, in 2003, the "Big Drench Tour", a roadshow of a thirty foot tall apple shaped installation filled with water. Players must stand underneath and take part in a game of 'drench roulette' to win prizes.

In August 2009, a billboard campaign extolled the "weird and wonderful" side effects of drinking too much "Tango with added Tango Orange" (such as "Too much Tango made me suck a bull's udder" and "Too much Tango made me shave my Nan, 'innit."). The British press pointed out that the initials of "Tango With Added Tango" spelled the insult "twat" when read vertically, and this was later revealed to be intentional. The British advertising regulator Advertising Standards Authority ruled that the ad was not offensive, following a number of complaints particularly regarding the bull.

=== Television ===
Beginning in the late 1980s, surrealism was becoming a mainstream technique in advertising. Answering Tango's search for a new ad campaign, ad agency HHCL created the catchphrase "You know when you've been Tango'd". The campaign began in 1992 with the advert Orange Man; it featured a man drinking Tango and immediately being slapped around the face by a portly man painted orange (Peter Geeves). The advert received widespread condemnation after a craze for "Tangoing" people swept the nation's playgrounds, and there were reports of children receiving serious injuries, or even being deafened by being slapped on the ears.

Tango voluntarily replaced the "slapping" advert with an almost identical new version, where the orange clad person kisses the man instead of hitting him. The original version was ranked third in a list of "The 100 Greatest TV Ads", in a 2000 poll conducted by The Sunday Times and Channel 4.

Most subsequent Tango advertisements have avoided showing violence, except for the advert from October 2004, "Pipes", which showed a man rolling down a hill with concrete pipes, causing it to be banned, and the advert from March 1997, "Vote Orange Now", where the orange clad man made another appearance, slapping the advert's protagonist several times. This latter advert was featured in the first advert break on Channel 5.

In May 1994, Tango launched new TV ads for its Apple flavour Tango with seductive themes.

In March 2000, an advert originally produced in 1998, which depicted a pre-fame James Corden being bullied for not drinking Tango, was banned because it was seen as encouraging the bullying of overweight children. The replacement was a satirically inoffensive advert, Drink Tango: It's Nice.

Later that year, as Tango Strange Soda launched, three ultimately unsuccessful advertisements for the drink (Taste Buds, Trainers and Classroom) were aired featuring a man's "taste buddies" which are a group of young men behaving as the man's taste buds that vibrate rapidly when the man consumes Strange Soda. The "taste buddy" actors in the advertisements were shot as live action, with the actor standing on a moveable circular frame which was then manoeuvred via a handle to give the "vibrating" trembling effect for each of the "buddies" seen on screen.

In early 2006, Tango spoofed the famous Sony Bravia LCD TV commercial of bouncing balls recorded in San Francisco. Tango's commercial was set in Swansea and featured fruit instead of coloured balls, using the same production style and the same music track, and a parody of Sony's slogan turning it into 'Refreshment like no other'. In December 2008, Tango launched the "Save Tango" campaign. The Save Tango campaign resulted in an 8% increase in sales over 12 weeks.

The 'Tanguru' TV campaign was launched in 2019, involving a fictional character called Tanguru solving awkward situations.

Tango advertisements have sometimes featured phone numbers for viewers to call, although the phone numbers would typically appear too briefly on the screen for viewers to type in the number or write it down. Many of these advertisements incorporate a send-away prize, including a rubber doll or a clown horn (the Tango Horn). A notable exception was an advert which first premièred in 1993 for Still Tango disguised as a subvert falsely alerting people that the drink is unauthorised, and features a phone number for 'affected' viewers to call.

==== St George commercial ====
Blackcurrant Tango is notable for the multiple award-winning television commercial from 1997, St George, which was used to promote it.

For the launch of Blackcurrant Tango in 1996, HHCL produced the "St. George" television and cinema advertisement. In the advertisement, a member of Tango's customer service staff, Ray Gardner, provides a response to a letter of complaint about the flavour of Blackcurrant Tango he has received from Sebastien Loyes, a French exchange student. The letter prompts an increasingly jingoistic tirade during which Ray Gardner removes his suit to reveal bright purple boxing shorts. In one seemingly continuous take, he walks from his office, marches out of Tango's building, and is joined by a flag waving crowd as he enters a boxing ring.

As the camera pulls back, the ring is revealed to be perched on the edge of the White Cliffs of Dover. As the camera circles, Gardner can be heard shouting, "Come on France, Europe, the world. I'll take you all on! I'm Ray Gardner. I drink Blackcurrant Tango. Come and get me!" whilst three Harrier jump jets with purple landing lights hover in the background.

The advertisement was notable for the use of digital editing to seamlessly merge a number of tracking shots, including the final transition from a sky camera to a helicopter shot. Ray Gardner later won the ITV Best Actor in a Commercial award for his performance. The commercial was voted the Best Long Commercial (1956–2001), by the United Kingdom's Film4 television channel in June 2007. The song that appeared in the advertisement, "Don't You Want Me" by Felix, was rereleased with Tango branding.

== Recalls ==
On 17 June 1994, more than 1 million bottles of Still Tango, the still variant of the drink, was recalled after customers complained that it "tasted off" and caused them to feel ill.

On 25 August 2005, over 100,000 cans of Tango Cherry and Tango Fruit Fling were recalled over fears they could burst due to having higher-than-normal levels of a naturally occurring yeast, which had made its way inside the drinks during the canning process.
