= Kia-Ora =

Fruit drink

- Type: Soft drink
- Manufacturer: The Coca-Cola Company
- Origin: Australia, Sydney
- Introduced: 1903

Kia-Ora (/ˈkjɔːrə/ KYOR-ə) is a concentrated fruit soft drink brand, made by Atlantic Industries (a subsidiary of the Coca-Cola Company) and licensed for manufacturing in Ireland and up to 2019 in the UK by Coca-Cola Enterprises Ltd. The juice drink is sold in a concentrated state.

== History ==
The brand-name is taken from kia ora, a Māori language greeting which has entered New Zealand English. The first Kia-Ora was a lemon squash sold by Arthur Gasquoine in Sydney, Australia, in 1903. The brand was bought by the Dixon family in the same year; the first factory was established by Roland Dixon in Prahran in Melbourne. The original factory chimney still exists and is now a heritage-listed building. The first bottle off the production line is still in the hands of the Dixon family, as is the original recipe for Chilli Cordial, one of the first flavours launched, alongside orange and lemon. Kia-Ora was launched in Great Britain in 1917 in orange and lemon flavours.

The success of Kia-Ora caused the Dixon family to expand the range of its drinks with other flavours: orange mixed fruit, raspberry, and pear are examples of the expanding range. No-added-sugar variants were also created. Kia-Ora prospered throughout the 20th century. The Second World War affected the brand only slightly in terms of production. The brand remained popular amongst children aged 3-10 in Australia and in the United Kingdom. From 1953, Kia-Ora was advertising with full-colour posters. In 1961, Kia-Ora was sold to the Campbell's of the US. The name's pronunciation is explained by John Betjeman in his poem Margate, 1940: "Kee-Ora".

The brand became popular in the UK in the 1970s. It was widely available in cinemas, ready-to-drink in cartons, paired with an advertisement spoofing the Columbia Pictures logo. In 1982, Kia-Ora launched a colourful, animated advertising campaign, directed by Oscar Grillo of Klacto Animations, which used the jingle "We all adore a Kia-Ora", and featured a child in a straw hat, a dog called Fedora who served the drink, and several crows which pursued the boy for a drink — with the boy responding with "it's too orangey for crows" —, including a crow playing a saxophone. Later promotions included Caramba's song "Fido"; the jingle was referred to in the Spaced episode "Gone". The advertisements attracted criticism in later years, because of their use of Jim Crow-style racial stereotypes in their depiction of the characters. The brand was refreshed in 1987, with a series of advertisements directed by Geoff Dunbar, featuring redesigned characters, the introduction of the boy's chubby father, and new variations on the jingle.

The success of the Kia-Ora brand subsequently declined, overtaken by rival juice producers such as MiWadi and Robinsons. Coca-Cola eventually discontinued all variations except sugar-free orange and sugar-free mixed fruit.

In spring 2019 Coca-Cola discontinued production in the UK. The drink continues to be made in Ireland by local company Harney Enterprises under license.

== Variations ==
=== Current ===
- Kia-Ora Orange (no added sugar)
- Kia-Ora Mixed Fruit (no added sugar)
- Kia-Ora Blackcurrant

=== Discontinued ===
- Kia-Ora Orange, Pineapple and Passion Fruit
- Kia-Ora Orange (with added sugar)
- Kia-Ora Mixed Fruit
- Kia-Ora Pear & Blackcurrant
- Kia-Ora Raspberry

== See also ==
- Soft drink
- Coca-Cola
