= Elderflower cordial =

Kind of soft drink

The flower of the elder used in making Elderflower cordial.

Elderflower cordial is a soft drink made largely from a refined sugar and water solution and uses the flowers of the European elder (Sambucus nigra L.). Historically, the cordial was popular in Northwestern Europe where it has a Victorian heritage. However, versions of an elderflower cordial recipe can be traced to Roman times. In the 21st century, it is consumed in many countries of Europe where people still make it in the traditional way. In some countries, the drink can be found as an aromatic syrup, sold as a concentrated squash that is mixed with still or sparkling water. Elderflower pressé is a premixed form of this.

== Production ==
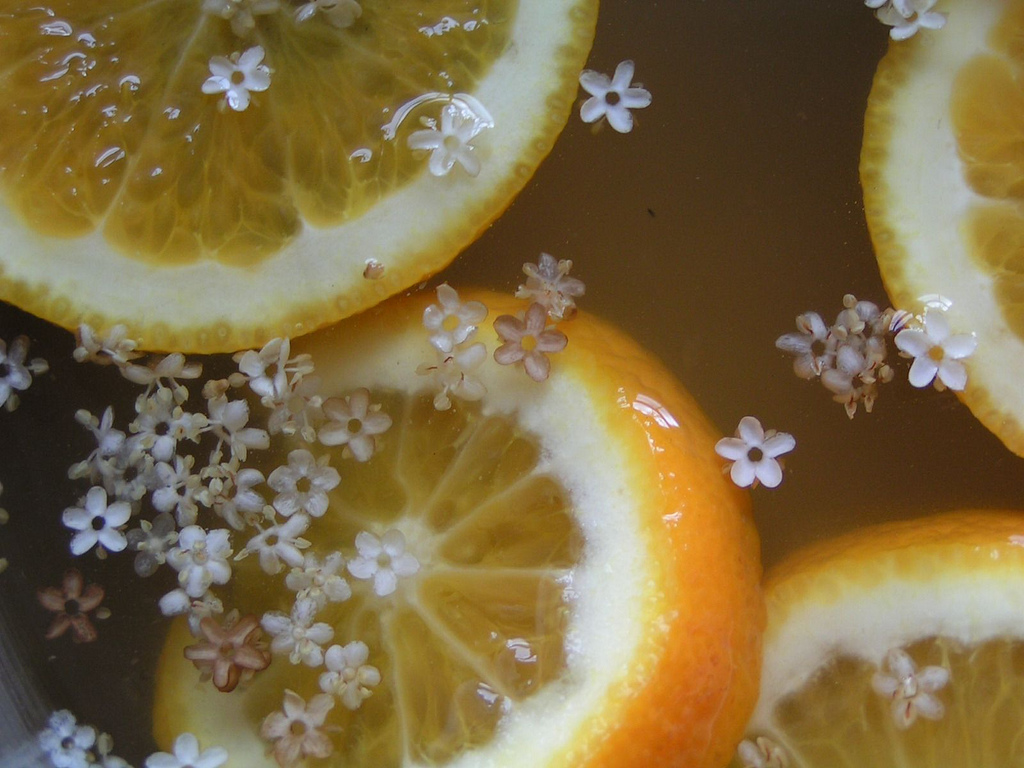
Elderflower cordial steeping

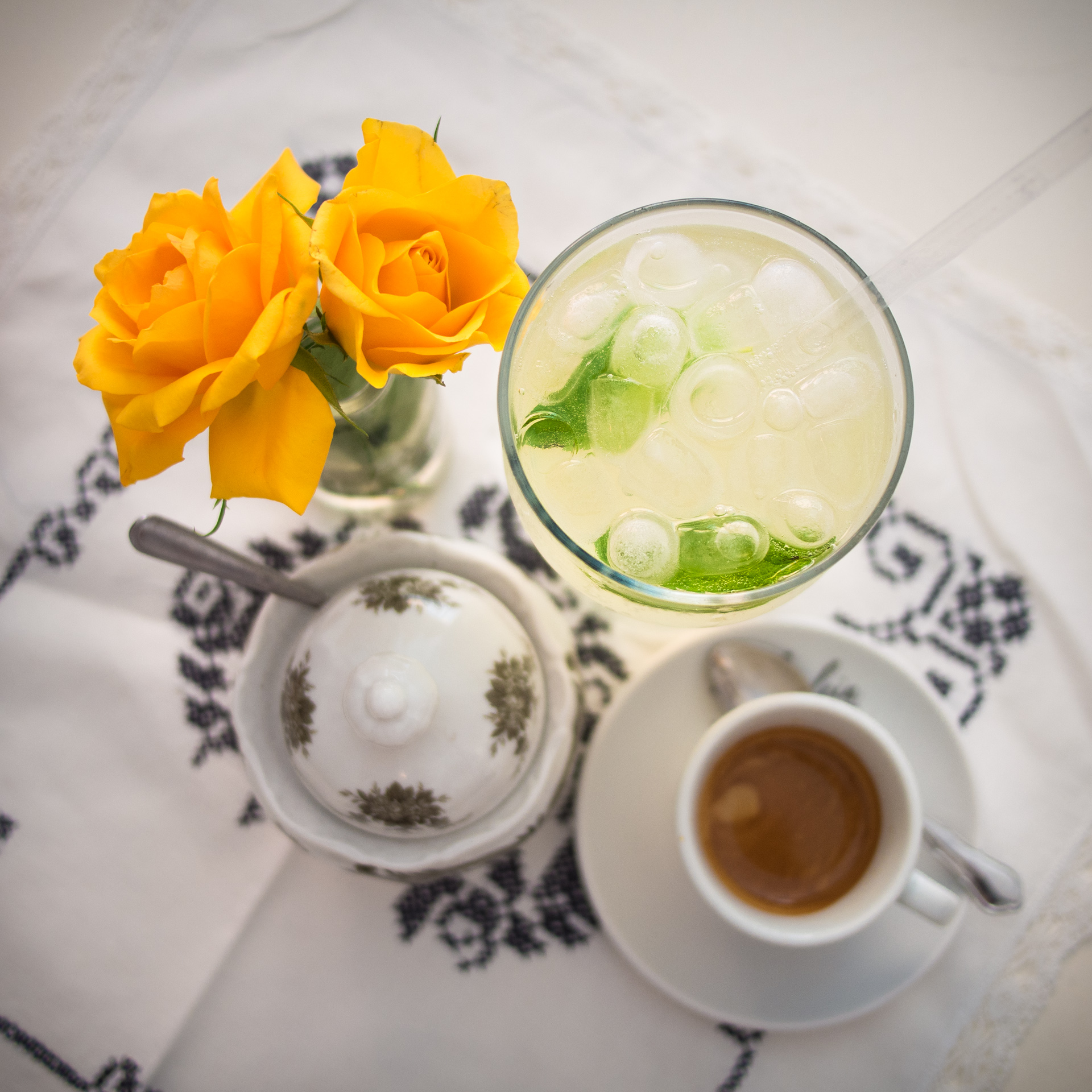
Elderflower lemonade in a café in Munich, Germany

In the northern hemisphere, elderflowers are in season from the end of May to the beginning of June or later and grow in most of Europe, northwest Africa and southwest Asia. They grow in a variety of conditions including both wet and dry fertile soils, though they primarily prefer sunny locations. The elder's hermaphrodite flowers are borne in large corymbs, 10–25 cm in diameter, where the individual flowers are white with five petals, 5–6 mm in diameter, and pollinated by flies. The cream-coloured flowerheads are honey-scented blossoms that are crisp and somewhat juicy, with a highly aromatic smell and flavour. The leaves are bitter-smelling.

Elderflower cordial can be made relatively easily at home, though it is also produced and sold commercially. The flowerheads are best collected fresh and new when the tiny buds have just opened and come to bloom before the fragrance is tainted with bitterness. The cordial is made by steeping the elderflower heads in a concentrated sugar solution so the flavour is infused into the syrup. A source of citric acid and lemon juice is added to help preserve the cordial and add tartness. The mixture is then covered and left to infuse before being strained to release as much juice as possible. For drinking the cordial is typically diluted with either water or sparkling water though tonic, soda or gin are also used.

Commercial production of elderflower cordial uses a scaled-up version of the process described. Commercially produced cordials are generally sold as a concentrated squash and are usually diluted by one part cordial and ten parts water, thus a 500 ml bottle of cordial would be enough for 5.5 litres diluted. The high concentration of sugar in elderflower cordial gives it a long shelf life. There are many commercial producers of elderflower cordial, and cheaper canned fizzy "elderflower drinks" and "elderflower sodas" often use a synthetic cheap elderflower flavouring to save money and labour, as well as a real elderflower extract.

== Elderflower pressé ==
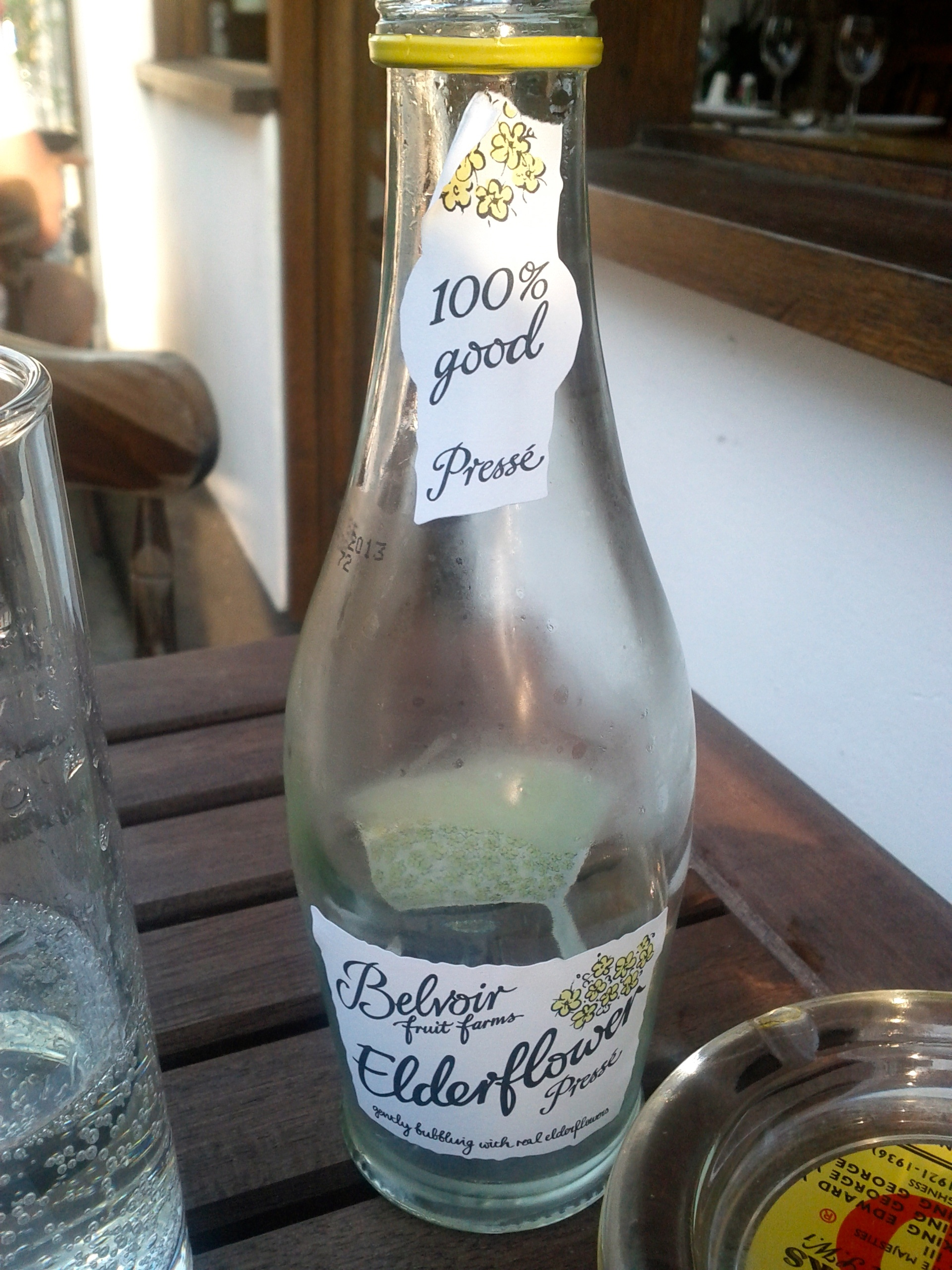
A bottle of soft drink elderflower pressé made by Belvoir Farm

Elderflower pressé is a sweetened, carbonated soft drink. It is made from elderflower cordial or a synthetic equivalent. Other ingredients will include lemons and sweetener.

Elderflower pressé is therefore similar to citron pressé and lemonade, and effectively a premixed form of elderflower cordial. Like them, it is used as a mixer in cocktails.

== See also ==
- Socată
- Squash (drink)
- Cordial
