= Squash (drink) =

Non-alcoholic concentrated syrup

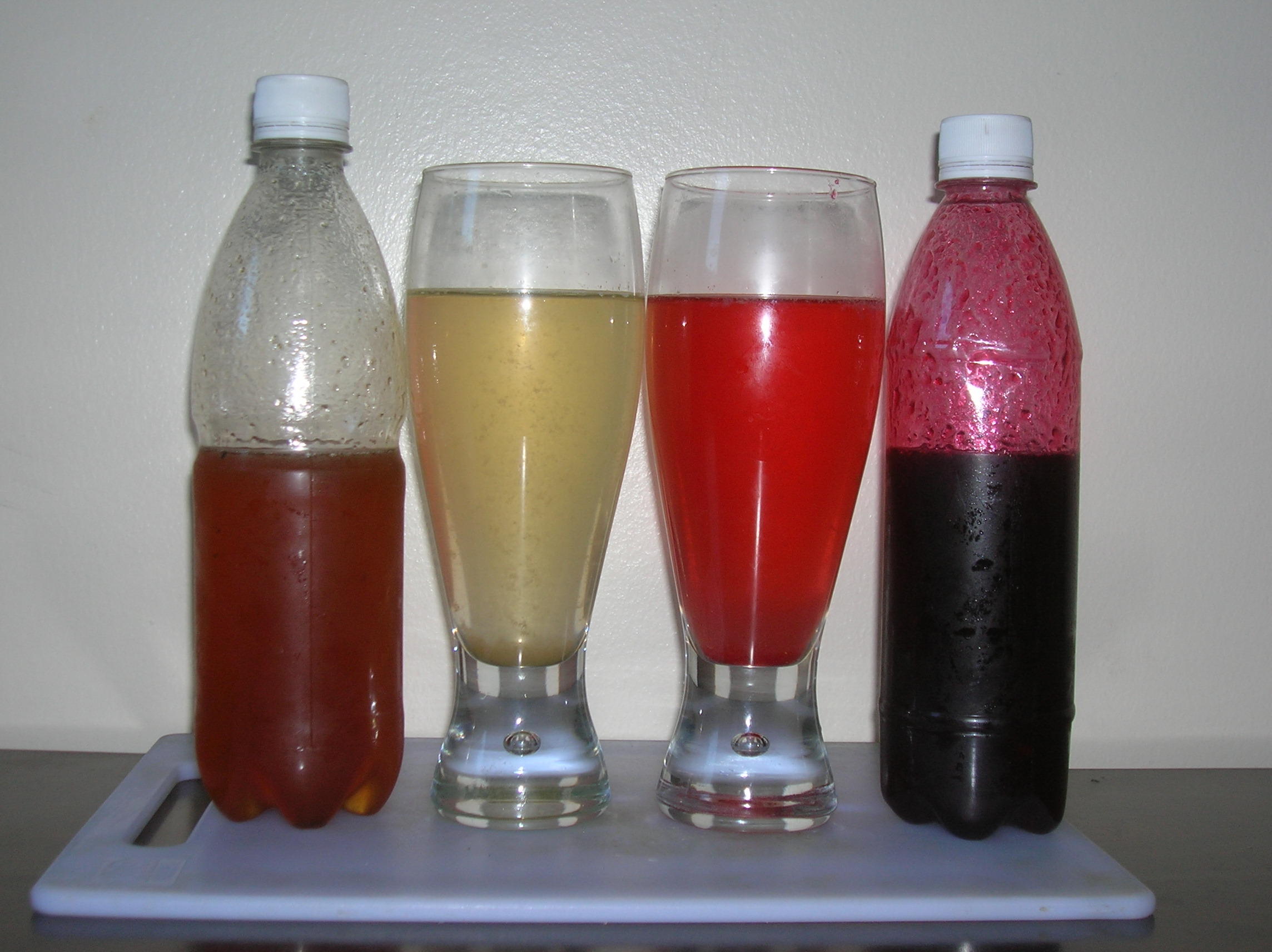
Fruit-flavoured squash, before and after being mixed with water

Squash (sometimes known as cordial in British English, dilute in Hiberno-English, diluting juice in Scottish English, and water juice in the Northern Isles of Scotland) is a non-alcoholic beverage with syrup used in beverage making. It is usually fruit-flavoured, made from fruit juice, water, and sugar or a sugar substitute. Modern squashes may also contain food colouring and additional flavouring. Some traditional squashes contain herbal extracts, most notably elderflower and ginger.

== Drinks ==
Squash is mixed with a certain amount of water or carbonated water before drinking. The amount of water added is to taste, with the squash becoming less strong the more it is diluted. As a drink mixer, it may be combined with an alcoholic beverage to prepare a cocktail.

Citrus fruits (particularly orange, lime and lemon) or a blend of fruits and berries are commonly used as the base of squash.

Traditional squashes in Britain are usually flavoured with elderflower, orange, lemon, or blackcurrant. Raspberry and blackberry are popular in Eastern Europe, and currants is a common ingredient in the Low Countries.

== Preparation ==
Squash is prepared by combining one part concentrate with four or five parts water (carbonated or still). Double-strength squash and traditional cordials, which are thicker, are mixed with nine parts water to one part concentrate. Some squash concentrates are quite weak, and these are sometimes mixed with one part concentrate and two or three parts water.

=== Storage ===
Most cordials and squashes contain preservatives such as potassium sorbate or (in traditional cordials) sulphites, as they are designed to be stored on shelves. They keep well because of the preservatives and their high sugar content. Nonetheless, some people choose to store their squash in refrigerators.

== Ingredients ==
Ingredients in squashes and cordials have evolved over the years. A traditional cordial contains three ingredients: sugar, juice or plant extract and some water. Usually it can contain an acidifier such as citric acid or in very old-fashioned cordials lemon juice, or even spices such as cinnamon or cloves. Recreations of these traditional preparations often contain a preservative, especially sulphur dioxide, although sugar alone will keep it fresh for quite a long time. Modern squash drinks are generally more complex and sugar free squash even more so; the ingredients are usually water, sweetener such as aspartame or sodium saccharin, juice in a low quantity (typically 5–10 percent), large quantities of flavouring, preservatives and sometimes a colour such as anthocyanin. In the middle are ordinary squashes, which contain sugar, water, a larger amount of juice, preservatives, colouring, and often a small amount of flavouring. Although colours such as Allura Red AC and Sunset Yellow FCF are occasionally used in squash, most modern British companies are gradually aiming to use natural colours such as beta carotene or anthocyanins, and natural flavourings.

=== Flavourings ===
Traditional squashes may be flavoured with elderflowers, lemon, pomegranate, apple, strawberry, chokeberry (often with spices such as cinnamon or cloves added), orange, pear, or raspberry.

Modern squashes usually have simpler flavours, such as orange, apple, summer fruit (mixed berries), blackcurrant, apple and blackcurrant, peach, pineapple, mango, lime, or lemon.

== Terminology ==
"Cordial", "diluting juice", and "squash" are similar products, although the products known as cordials tend to be thicker and stronger, requiring less syrup (or, conversely, more water) to be blended. In British English, "cordial" refers to a sweet fruit-flavoured drink (as different from a syrup). High juice is a type that contains a larger amount of juice, around 45%.

Squash is often colloquially known as "juice". However this term is a misnomer; no squash is pure juice. Squashes are commonly called according to the fruit from which they are made. More rarely, they may be called "fruit drink", especially if they are ready-diluted in a plastic bottle or paper carton (e.g., Fruit Shoot).

== Fruit juice content ==
Squashes are measured by their juice content, the average being 30%. A variety of squash that contains a larger amount of fruit juice, up to half or more of the volume in juice, is sold in markets as high juice, and squashes are quite often called "juice" when talking to children, especially these high-juice beverages, although this may be confusing. However, many squashes contain less than 20% juice, and some as little as 5–10%. The latter are typically low in nutritional value, and the high juice versions are reasonably higher in nutrients, but are generally high in sugar and lacking in fibre. A low juice squash may state "with real fruit juice" on the label.

== World markets ==
Cordial is popular in the United Kingdom and Commonwealth countries. It is not widely consumed in the United States.

Notable companies producing squash include Britvic (under the Robinsons, MiWadi and Teisseire brands), Hamdard (under the Rooh Afza brand in India, Pakistan and Bangladesh), Nichols (under the Vimto brand), Suntory (under the Ribena brand) and Coca-Cola (under the Kia-Ora brand). Australian brands include Cottee's, Bickford's, P&N Beverages and Golden Circle cordials. Indian brands include Rasna. In Israel, fruit squashes are produced by such companies as Prigat.

In the Nordic countries, squash is widely known as saft, a sweet fruit- or berry-based concentrate diluted with water before drinking. Homemade saft has traditionally been a way of preserving seasonal fruit and berries, while commercially produced concentrates are widely available. Common flavours include blackcurrant, raspberry, redcurrant and mixed fruit. In Norway, hot blackcurrant cordial, known as ''solbærtoddy'', has traditionally been a popular drink during winter outdoor activities, particularly in the mountains.

In Sweden, elderflower cordial (fläderblomssaft) is particularly popular, alongside blackcurrant, strawberry and rhubarb varieties. Homemade cordials remain part of Swedish food traditions.

== Animal consumption ==
The gorillas at London Zoo are given both squash and cold fruit tea to drink. When a silverback called Kumbuka escaped from his enclosure in 2016, he drank five litres (8.8 imperial pints) of undiluted blackcurrant squash that was in the keepers' area.

== See also ==
- Cordial (medicine)
- Drink mix
- Elderflower cordial
- Flavored syrup
- Fruit syrup
- Grenadine
- Lemonade
- List of syrups
- Nectar (drink)
- Ribena
- Shrub (drink)
- Temperance bar
