= Ballygowan (disambiguation) =

Ballygowan may refer to:

== Places in Northern Ireland ==
- Ballygowan, County Down, a village in County Down
  - Ballygowan railway station, on the Belfast and County Down Railway
- Four other townlands in County Down; see List of townlands in County Down:
  - Ballygowan, Aghaderg, County Down
  - Ballygowan, Moira, County Down
    - Ballygowan Halt railway station on the Banbridge, Lisburn and Belfast Railway
  - Ballygowan, Drumbeg, County Down
  - Ballygowan, Kilkeel, County Down
- Ballygowan, County Antrim
- Ballygowan, County Tyrone; see List of townlands of County Tyrone

== Places in the Republic of Ireland ==
- Ballygowan, County Carlow; see List of townlands of County Carlow
- Ballygowan, County Galway; see List of townlands of County Galway
- Ballygowan, County Louth; see List of townlands of County Louth
- Ballygowan, County Mayo; see List of townlands of County Mayo
- In Kilkenny; see List of townlands of County Kilkenny
  - Ballygowan, Ponsonby, County Kilkenny
  - Ballygowan, Reade, County Kilkenny

== Places in Scotland ==
- Ballygowan, Kilmartin Glen, site of prehistoric cup-and-ring marks
- Cnoc Ballygowan, Isle of Arran

== Other ==
- Ballygowan water, mineral water brand
- Ballygowan, a horse which started the 1965 Grand National

== Similar spelling ==
- Balgowan (disambiguation)
- Ballygown, Isle of Mull, Argyll and Bute, Scotland
