= J2O =

Fruit juice based still soft drink

J_{2}O
- Type: Soft drink
- Manufacturer: Carlsberg Britvic
- Origin: United Kingdom
- Introduced: 1998
- Related products: Robinsons; Britvic 55; Tango
- Website: j2o.co.uk

J_{2}O is a still soft drink made from fruit juices. It is manufactured by Carlsberg Britvic subsidiary Britvic, and sold in the United Kingdom and Ireland. Its launch in 1998 was led by Sheraz Dar who joined Britvic in 1994, and was aimed at providing an alternative solution for people who were going out to bars and clubs but were not drinking alcoholic beverages. The name J_{2}O is a pun on the chemical formula for water, H_{2}O, chosen due to the drink's fruit juice content. The first flavours available were Orange & Passion fruit, Apple & Mango and Apple & Melon, but the range has progressively grown since.

== History ==
In 2001, due to growing brand success, the J_{2}O packaging was redesigned and a fourth flavour, Orange & Cranberry, was introduced. In 2002, due to the brand's popularity within the on-trade sector, J_{2}O was made available to the take-home market for the first time, with four-bottle packs being introduced into supermarkets and retail shops. The packaging was again changed in 2005, and Apple & Raspberry was introduced.

On 2 August 2006, Britvic announced a promotional campaign designed to coincide with the Little Britain live tour. The campaign, named "J2O is in for a laugh" allows buyers to enter a competition to win one of 96 VIP tickets to see the Little Britain show.

As of 15 August 2007, J_{2}O has been made available to bars, clubs, and restaurants in the Chicago area and is imported by Exotic Beverage Co.

In 2009, J_{2}O introduced two new flavours, Grape & Kiwi and Winter Berries. Both of these flavours were originally limited edition but have since been integrated into the range of permanent flavours. 2010 saw a major packaging redesign and the launch of the J_{2}O White Blend range. Two flavours, one based on white grape, the other on red grape, are less sweet than the existing J_{2}O flavours and are designed to complement food, in the same way that white and red wine does. Orange & passion fruit and apple & mango (the 2 most popular flavours) have been released in PET bottles.

In 2011, a limited edition flavour of J_{2}O called "Glitter Berry" was brought out. Then in 2012, 2 further limited edition flavours, papaya punch and diamond berry were released. In 2013, a limited edition Pear Gold version was released for summer. In 2020, J_{2}O won the Lausanne Index Prize - Supreme Award.

== The Junior’s crew 2 Old Irish beats ==
In November 2014, J_{2}O launched a TV advert called Junior's crew 2 Old Irish beats, which featured contemporary London dance outfit Junior's Crew, break-dancing to a live Irish folk band called The Other Brothers. The TV advert was filmed in Stoke Newington Town Hall and debuted during The X-Factor on ITV1 (Nov 2014).

== Flavours ==
As of 2019, the J2O range of flavours includes:

- Apple & Mango
- Apple & Raspberry
- Orange & Passion Fruit
- Orange and Cranberry
- Spritz Pear & Raspberry
- Spritz Apple & Watermelon
- Spritz Apple & Elderflower
- Spritz Peach & Apricot
- Flamingo Fling (Limited Edition)
- Midnight Forest-orange, cherry & chocolate (Limited Edition)
- Toucan Tryst (Limited Edition)
- Glitterberry (Seasonal, appears around Christmas)
- Summer Shine (Limited Edition)
