= John Graham (British Army officer, born 1778) =

British Army officer

Lieutenant-Colonel John Graham (24 April 1778 – 13 March 1821) was a British Army officer and colonial administrator best known for founding the settlement of Grahamstown in the Cape Colony in 1812. Grahamstown went on to become a military, administrative, judicial and educational centre for its surrounding region.

== Family origins ==
Graham was born in Dundee, Scotland. He was the second son of Robert Graham, the last laird of the demesne of Fintry and 12th representative of the Grahams of Fintry in Forfarshire, Scotland. Later in life, John became the thirteenth representative of the Fintry Grahams following the death of his elder brother in 1799 and his father in 1816.

At the age of 16, Graham was commissioned in the British Army, joining the 90th Regiment of Foot, which had been raised in 1794 by his kinsman, Thomas Graham of Balgowan (later Lord Lynedoch). Two expeditions to France in the late-1790s were followed by an appointment as aide-de-camp to the Earl of Chatham, who Graham served in the Netherlands. After three years on Guernsey with his regiment, Graham was sent to Ireland in 1803 and became assistant quartermaster-general.

In January 1806, Graham was promoted to the rank of Major in the 93rd Regiment of Foot, in which capacity he took part in the Battle of Blaauwberg, under which the Dutch Cape Colony was annexed by the British Crown. Rapid promotion to lieutenant colonel led to him being given charge of the Cape Regiment, based at Wynberg, which Graham trained as light infantry capable of delivering outstanding performance in wooded terrain.

== The founding of Grahamstown ==
In 1811, Graham was sent with the Cape Regiment and Boer auxiliaries from Swellendam, Graaff-Reinet and Uitenhage to undertake the task which was to define his military career: clearing around 20,000 Xhosa people led by Ndlambe ka Rharhabe. The Xhosa had settled in the Zuurveld (later called Albany), a district between the Bushman's and Fish rivers, which lay beyond the Cape Colony's frontiers. The Zuurveld was mistakenly assumed by the colonial government to be part of the colony as they misread the frontier laid down by Governor Joachim van Plettenberg in 1778.

The campaign to clear the Xhosa residents from the Eastern frontier was characterized by John Cradock as involving no more bloodshed "than was necessary to impress on the minds of these savages a proper degree of terror and respect"". During the campaign, scorched earth tactics, including the burning of Xhosa farms were used to clear them from the Eastern frontier.

By 1812 Graham's task was complete, and so on the deserted loan farm De Rietfontein, he established Graham’s Town as Zuurveld's central military post, with a string of linked forts along the Fish River. The same year he returned to Britain on leave of absence then accompanied his cousin Thomas to the Netherlands as his aide-de-camp and private military secretary.

Graham died in Wynberg on 13 March 1821. He was buried in the Somerset Road Cemetery. This was the principal graveyard in Cape Town until 1886. Before the levelling of the Somerset Road Cemetery and building started on the site in about 1922, a number of inscribed stones were lifted from their graves and deposited at the Woltemade cemetery at Maitland which had been opened as Cape Town’s principal graveyard in 1886. His tombstone lies there today and a window was erected to his memory in St Saviour’s Church, Claremont, in about 1931.

In 1912, a monument was erected in High Street, Grahamstown, on the site of "Graham's Tree", the Mimosa where Graham had made the decision to establish the settlement.

== Family ==
On 24 July 1812, Graham married Johanna Catharina Cloete (1790-1843), a descendant of Jacob Klute (or Cloete) of Westerford, the first permanent settler at the Cape. Along with three daughters named Johanna-Catharina, Elizabeth-Margaret and Isabella-Ann, the couple had a son, Robert, who became civil commissioner of Albany.

== Descendants ==
Of Graham's grandsons, two were knighted, one as Secretary of Law of the Cape Colony, the other Judge President of the Eastern Districts Court in Grahamstown.
