= Balgowan =

Balgowan may refer to:

- Balgowan, South Africa
- Balgowan, South Australia
- Balgowan, Dundee, a suburb of Dundee in Scotland
- Balgowan, Perth and Kinross, a village in Scotland

== See also ==
- Ballygowan (disambiguation)
