= Marston's plc =

British pub and hotel chain

- Type: Public
- Traded as: LSE: MARS
- Industry: Hospitality (originally brewing)
- Founded: 1834; 192 years ago
- Founder: John Marston
- Headquarters: Wolverhampton, England
- Key people: William Rucker (chairman); Justin Platt (CEO - effective from 10 January 2024)
- Products: Pubs, hotels, restaurants
- Revenue: ▼£897.9 million (2025)
- Operating income: ▲£179.7 million (2025)
- Net income: ▲£71.6 million (2025)
- Number of employees: 10,000 (2026)
- Website: www.marstonspubs.co.uk

Marston's plc is a British pub and hotel operator listed on the London Stock Exchange. Marstons was founded as a brewery by John Marston in 1834, Through mergers it became Marston, Thompson & Evershed.

The company was taken over in 1999 by Wolverhampton & Dudley Breweries plc which changed their name to Marstons plc in 2007.

In 2020, the company shifted its main focus away from its original brewing operations, entering it into a joint venture with Carlsberg Group's UK operations as Carlsberg Marston's Brewing Company (CMBC). In July 2024, Carlsberg bought out Marston's remaining 40% share, ending the company's 190 years of owning breweries.

== History ==
=== 1834–2019 ===
In 1834, John Marston established J. Marston & Son at the Horninglow Brewery in Burton upon Trent. By 1861, the brewery produced 3,000 barrels a year. In 1890, Marston & Son Ltd was registered as a limited liability company. In 1898, Marston's amalgamated with John Thompson & Son Ltd and moved to Albion Brewery on Shobnall Road, which the company still operates. By this time, the brewery had a capacity of 100,000 barrels a year. It was at this time that the Burton Union System began to be used. In 1905, the company merged with Sydney Evershed to form Marston, Thompson & Evershed.

Banks & Co has been brewing at the Park Brewery in Wolverhampton since 1875. In 1890, Banks became Wolverhampton & Dudley Breweries when the company amalgamated with George Thompson & Sons and Charles Colonel Smith's Brewery. In 1943, Wolverhampton & Dudley Breweries took over Julia Hanson & Sons, with 200 pubs. It was first listed on the London Stock Exchange in 1947. It acquired Camerons Brewery in Hartlepool in 1992 and sold it to Castle Eden in 2002, whilst retaining some of Cameron's tied pubs.

In 1999, Wolverhampton & Dudley Breweries purchased Marston, Thompson & Evershed, and in the same year took over the Mansfield Brewery of Nottinghamshire and closed it down, transferring production of Mansfield beers to the Park Brewery. In 2005, Marston's Brewery took over production under licence from Interbrew of Draught Bass, succeeding Coors. Later in 2005, the Jennings Brewery of Cockermouth was purchased and in 2007 Hampshire-based Ringwood Brewery, which was established in 1978, and brews Best Bitter, Fortyniner, and Old Thumper, was acquired. In 2007, the company changed its name from Wolverhampton & Dudley Breweries plc to Marston's plc.

In late 2013, there was some controversy when it was announced that Marston's would sell some 200 pubs to new company New River Retail. The fear was that many would close and be turned into convenience stores. In 2014, the company took over production of most Thwaites beers. On 31 March 2015, it was announced the company was buying the bulk of Thwaites beer supply business outright and the top two brands Wainwright and Lancaster Bomber for around £25m. In May 2017, Marston's announced further expansion with the acquisition of Charles Wells's Eagle Brewery in Bedford. This gave Marston's ownership of the Bombardier, Courage and McEwan's ale brands, and the global licence for Young's beers.

=== 2020–present ===
In February 2020, Marston's signed a five-year extension to its distribution deal with Japanese beer maker Kirin.

In May 2020, it was announced that subject to competition law and shareholder approval, Marston's would merge its brewing business with Carlsberg UK (the United Kingdom arm of Carlsberg Group), into a joint venture valued at £780m. Marston's will take a 40% stake in the joint venture and receive up to £273m in cash. The deal will involve Marston's six breweries and distribution depots, but not its 1,400 pubs. The merger was approved by the Competition and Markets Authority on 9 October 2020. The new brewing company will be headquartered in Wolverhampton and be known as Carlsberg Marston's Brewing Company. It was also announced that the transaction was expected to be completed by the end of October 2020. The same month, the company announced that it will cut over 2,150 jobs (a fifth of their employees) as a result of the strict UK government measures to fight the spread of the COVID-19 pandemic. In December 2020, Marston's took over the running of 156 pubs in Wales from Welsh brewer Brains.

Andrew Andonis Andrea stepped down as CEO with immediate effect on 17 November 2023. He was replaced by Justin Platt.

By May 2023, the business had become heavily indebted; it set a target of reducing net debt to £1 billion by 2026. J.P. Morgan Cazenove analysts said in May 2023 that "a pub estate with mediocre [Like for Like] sales in recent years, combined with still-high leverage, makes us cautious despite attractive valuation metrics."

It was announced on 8 July 2024, that Marston's had decided to sell their 40% share in CMBC to Carlsberg, in a bid to concentrate on the running of the pub business, in a deal valued at £206m. Carlsberg was also buying the soft drinks company Britvic and would combine it with the soft drinks business of CMBC. This did however leave the future of brewing in Wolverhampton in question. A review of the business took place once the sale had been completed and the Park Brewery closed down in 2025.

== Operations ==
The company operates over 1,350 pubs and bars across England and Wales as of 2024, around 300 tenanted and 500 leased and a hotel chain.
