= Top Deck =

Top Deck may refer to:

- Top Deck (drink), a defunct brand of carbonated soft drink sold in the United Kingdom
- Top Deck (horse) (born 1945), an American Thoroughbred stallion
- Topdeck Travel, a tour company with origins in double decker bus trails
- Dairy Milk Top Deck, a chocolate bar sold in Australia, New Zealand, the United Kingdom, Ireland, and South Africa by Cadbury products
