= Carlsberg Britvic =

British beverage producer (formed 2025)

- Type: Subsidiary
- Industry: Brewery, Soft drink
- Predecessor: Carlsberg UK • Britvic plc • Brewery business of Marston's plc
- Founded: 2 November 2020; 6 years ago
- Headquarters: Hemel Hempstead, England
- Key people: Paul Davies, CEO
- Products: Marston's Pedigree, 1664, Robinsons, Tango, R. White's, J_{2}O
- Brands: Carlsberg (UK); Licensee: 7Up; Mountain Dew; Pepsi; Lipton
- Owner: Carlsberg Group
- Parent: Carlsberg A/S
- Subsidiaries: Britvic
- Website: www.carlsbergbritvic.co.uk

Carlsberg Britvic (formerly Carlsberg Marston’s Brewing Company) is a British subsidiary of Carlsberg Group. Initially created in November 2020 by the merger of Marston's plc breweries and Carlsberg's UK division to form Carlsberg Marston. In January 2025, Carlsberg bought Britvic and merged it into Carlsberg Marston, forming Carlsberg Britvic.

== History ==
In 2020, Marston's plc merged its brewing business with Carlsberg UK (the United Kingdom arm of Carlsberg Group), in a joint venture valued at £780m. Marston's took a 40% stake and received up to £273m in cash. The deal involved Marston's six breweries and distribution depots, but not its 1,400 pubs. The merger was approved by the Competition and Markets Authority on 9 October 2020.

In 2024, Marston's sold their 40% share in CMBC to Carlsberg for £206m in order to focus on running the pub business. The deal to acquire Marston's 40% stake in CMBC was completed on 21 July 2024.

Carlsberg then bought the soft drinks company Britvic plc for £3.3bn, merging it into Carlsberg Marston's, with the new group formally launched as Carlsberg Britvic in January 2025.

In February 2026, the company announced better than expected revenues of £10.3 billion, a rise on the previous year by 18.8%, even though organic sales had fallen by 2% due to the loss of the San Miguel licence. It also announced that the savings that were envisaged with the merger with Britvic were ahead of schedule and had already generated £110 million in savings.

== Operations ==
=== Beers ===
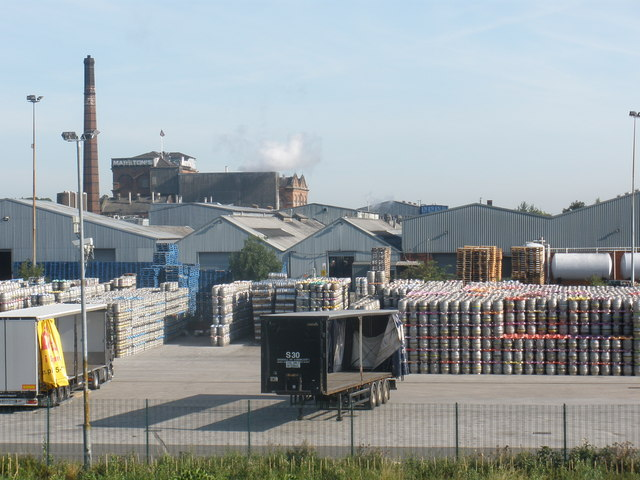
The Marston's Brewery in Burton upon Trent, 2009

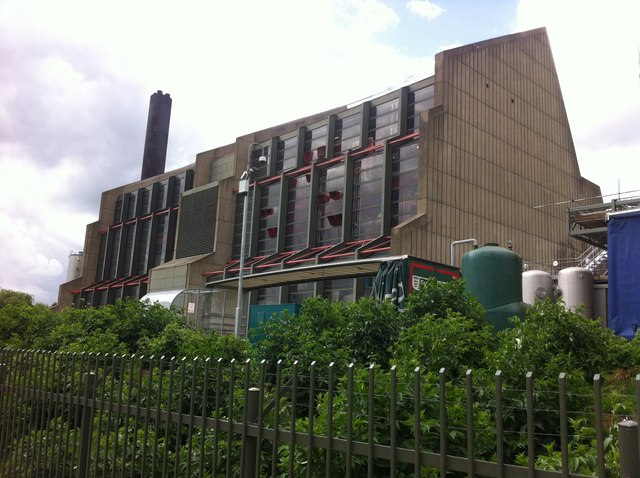
The Carlsberg Brewery in Northampton, 2013

The company originally owned and operated three breweries. This was reduced to two after the Banks's Brewery in Wolverhampton closed in September 2025.

- The Marston's Brewery in Burton upon Trent, established in 1834
- The Carlsberg Brewery in Northampton established in 1974

Marston's Brewery was one of the last major brewers to use Burton Union Sets, a system whereby fermentation barrels and troughs were linked together by pipework.

Half of all the company's beer is bottled. Marston's Pedigree is brewed in Burton-upon-Trent: it is a 4.3% ABV bitter. Introduced in 1952, it is Marston's flagship brand, selling 150,000 hectolitres in 2010. It was the only beer to use the oak Burton Union System so that it was fermented in wood; the ingredients are mineral-enriched Burton Water, malted barley, and Fuggles and Goldings hops. The Burton Union sets were retired in 2024.

Marston's had been brewing Thwaites' beers since early 2014 after Thwaites main brewery in Blackburn was shut down. Marston's acquired Thwaites' main brewing arm, including the Wainwright brand, in March 2015 for £25.1 million.

Carlsberg has been producing Special Brew in a modern production plant at Northampton since 1974.

Other beers distributed by the company include the 1664 brand, which was acquired from Heineken N.V. in June 2023.

=== Soft drinks ===
The Britvic subsidiary owns 39 brands in the UK include Robinsons, Tango, R. White's, and J_{2}O – as well as being the licensed bottler for PepsiCo products within the UK.

== Sponsorship ==
The Marston's Arena at Northwich Victoria F.C.

From 2007 to 2017, Marston's sponsored the England and Wales Cricket Board and Marston's Pedigree was the official beer of the England Cricket team. They were exclusive beer advertisers and suppliers at home test matches.

== See also ==
- Brewers of Burton
- British regional breweries using wooden casks
