= The Paper Cup Company =

European consumer products manufacturing company

Coordinates: 53°52′26.9″N 2°22′57.4″W

The Paper Cup Company aka Printed Cup Company
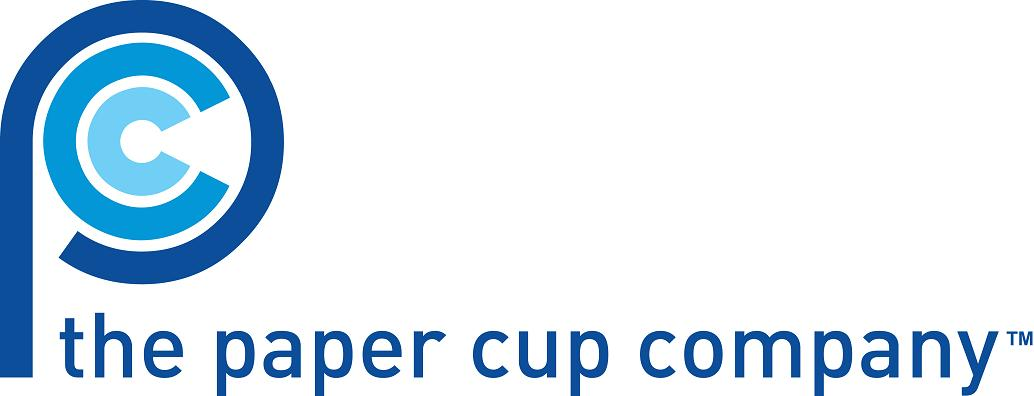
- Company type: Limited company
- Industry: Packaging
- Founded: 2006
- Headquarters: Clitheroe, United Kingdom
- Key people: Mark Woodward
- Products: Paper cups, PET containers, ice cream pots, popcorn buckets, straws, sleeves, lids
- Website: www.papercupcompany.com

The Paper Company is a European consumer products manufacturing organisation based in Clitheroe, Lancashire, United Kingdom. The company specialises in the printing and distribution of disposable paper cups operating out of its European manufacturing facility in Lancashire, England and Ningbo, Zhejiang, China.

== History of the company ==
The company was founded in March 2005, initially distributing within the United Kingdom from the home of managing director Mark Woodward. Despite the Great Recession, the company has sustained a 50% growth in trade year-on-year since its foundation, resulting in the creation of its European sales office in Clitheroe nestling in the Ribble Valley and the twofold expansion of its sales and marketing team.

Disposable paper cups have been printed and distributed by the Paper Cup Company for a large number of purposes, including coffee to go, cold drinks, vending, sampling and retail, as well as for medical and industrial uses. The company has produced high volumes of paper cups for major British companies and organisations, including the likes of Nestle, Robinsons, Land Rover, Butlins and Liverpool Football Club.

Although the exact origins of paper cups are unknown, they have gradually gained popularity since the early twentieth century following the development of the Dixie Cup in the United States by a Boston-based lawyer named Lawrence Luellen. The original purpose of this was to promote public hygiene and during the 1918 flu pandemic in the United States paper cups were increasingly used to avoid the spread of infection.

The foundation in 1936 of the Paper Container Manufacturing Company (later to become Solo) by Leo Hulseman in Chicago was the catalyst for the future development of the paper cup industry. In addition to the Paper Cup Company, a number of other organisations have been providing disposable consumer products for several years, including the Dickenson Robinson Group, and Benders in the United Kingdom, the Italian manufacturer Seda and the Finland-based company Huhtamaki.

== International growth and expansion ==
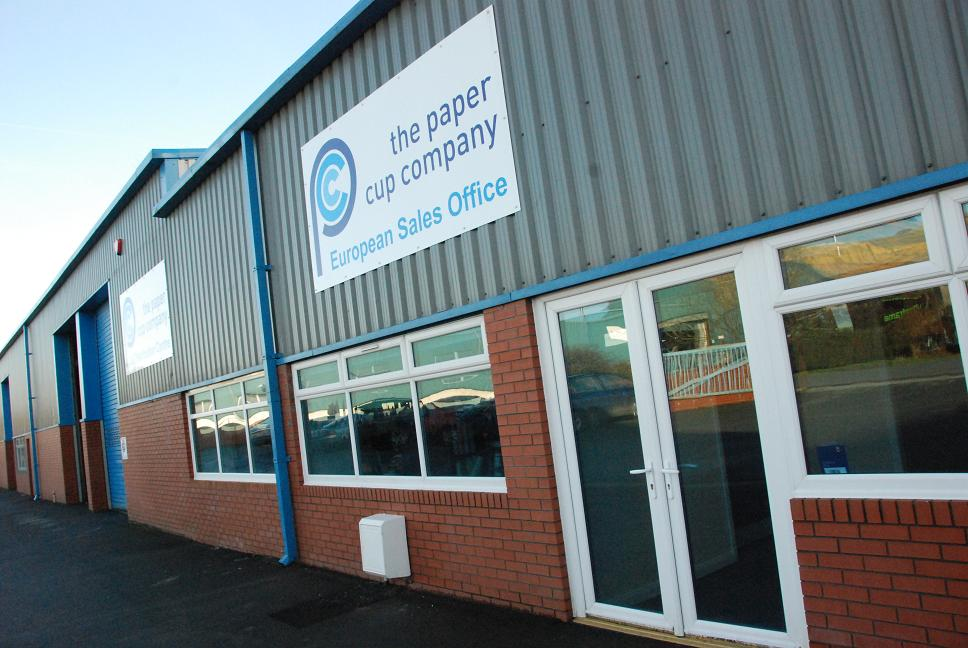
European sales office in Clitheroe

In addition to its domestic growth, The Paper Cup Company has built up a solid European customer base in France, Belgium, Germany, Denmark, Norway, Sweden, Finland, Latvia, Poland, Moldova, Greece and Italy, as well as providing paper cups to nations further afield including Egypt, Bahrain, Saudi Arabia and the United States.

The company's base in China started manufacturing hot drinks paper cups in most of the common sizes in 2007 and has since diversified into producing cups for cold drinks. These are distributed across the world from the Port of Ningbo, one of the busiest maritime hubs in mainland China.

Owing to its continued growth both in the United Kingdom and abroad, a European manufacturing unit has been opened in Lancashire England.

== Awards and environmental strategy ==
In November 2011 the Paper Cup Company received a Green Apple Environment Award as part of the Green Earth Appeal's campaign to find the most environmentally friendly companies in the United Kingdom. The award was presented to the company in the House of Commons, London, to recognise its achievement in becoming the world's first organisation to enable its customers to offset the carbon footprint of paper cups. The company has maintained this environmentally friendly strategy by working with the international Green Earth Appeal and the United Nations Environment Programme by planting a tree in the earthquake-hit island of Haiti for every thousand cups it sells.

In addition to this, the Paper Cup Company actively supports the national "Save A Cup" campaign by promoting the recycling of paper cups. Following its success and dedication to environmental sustainability, the company has been considered to represent the United Kingdom in the European Business Awards for the environment.

== Media coverage ==
On Monday 16 January 2012 the company appeared on television for the first time, featuring on the BBC One regional programme Inside Out. The programme centred on individuals who had been made redundant and had remarkably proceeded to establish successful businesses in the North West of England during times of economic hardship.

September 2015 the company built the largest paper cup in the world, although constructed on a wooden frame, it was paper on the outside, the paper was supplied by James Cropper, who not only recycle paper cups back into paper, but have also had their paper used in the construction of paper cups. The cup was yellow to celebrate the Tour of Britain cycle race going through Clitheroe. The cup was officially measured and by surveyor from Sunderland and Peacock 3m in diameter, 4.7m tall; if filled with water it would have held over 10 tons.
