= Harriet Philpin =

British actress (1951–2025)

- Born: Harriet Philpin Jones; 1 November 1951; Westminster, London, England
- Died: Between 1 January and 14 April 2025 (aged 73); Bere Island, Beara, County Cork, Ireland
- Education: Guildford School of Acting
- Occupations: Actress, seamstress, farmer
- Years active: 1969–2025
- Spouse(s): William Roach (m. 1975, divorced) David Andrews
- Children: 2

Harriet Philpin (1 November 1951 – T1 2025) was a British actress, the daughter of Welsh cartoonist William John Philpin Jones.

Philpin was best known in the UK for her appearances in the 1970s and 1980s as the wife of the 'Secret Lemonade Drinker' played by Julian Chagrin in commercials for R. White's Lemonade. In 2012, a nationwide search was held to track down the actress for a remake of the advert. She was traced to her new home in Ireland and was subsequently reunited with her co-star for the updated 'Secret Lemonade Licker' commercial to promote the brand's ice lollies.

== Life and career ==
Philpin was born at Westminster Hospital in London, on 1 November 1951. Trained at the Guildford School of Acting, she first began appearing in repertory from 1969. Subsequently, she made her West End debut in the Francis Durbridge thriller Suddenly at Home in January 1973. She also played Bettan in the 1975 Doctor Who serial Genesis of the Daleks, as well as appearing in such British television series as Blake's 7 and The Sweeney.

Giving up acting in the eighties to start a family, Philpin moved to Gloucestershire. There, with colleague Elspeth Williams, she set up Cottage Concern, looking after other people's weekend cottages in the Cotswolds, so as to stay busy and spend time with her family.

Eventually, Philpin moved to Bere Island and began a textiles business specialising in reusing vintage materials. A part of Bere Island Women Create, she held workshops making patchwork quilts.

Philpin later became an organic farmer with her husband David Andrews, owning seven hectares of land, a small herd of Dexter cattle and a one-acre market garden. She was instrumental in setting up Bere Island's weekly farmers' market, selling organic vegetables, salads and herbs.

At some point during the first third of 2025, Philpin passed away. A commemoration of her life was held at the Bere Island Heritage Centre on 26 April 2025.
