= Pennine Spring =

UK mineral water brand

Pennine Spring was a brand of mineral water owned by Britvic that comes from the Yorkshire Pennines, in the United Kingdom.

Established in 1871, Pennine Spring was produced by Ben Shaws of Huddersfield. In 2004, Britvic bought the brand and the Huddersfield factory. Pennine Spring was available as still and sparkling water and in Orange and Peach & Strawberry and Citrus flavours.

In 2013, Britvic shut down its Huddersfield factory which resulted in the Pennine Spring brand of mineral water being discontinued.
