= Belvoir Farm =

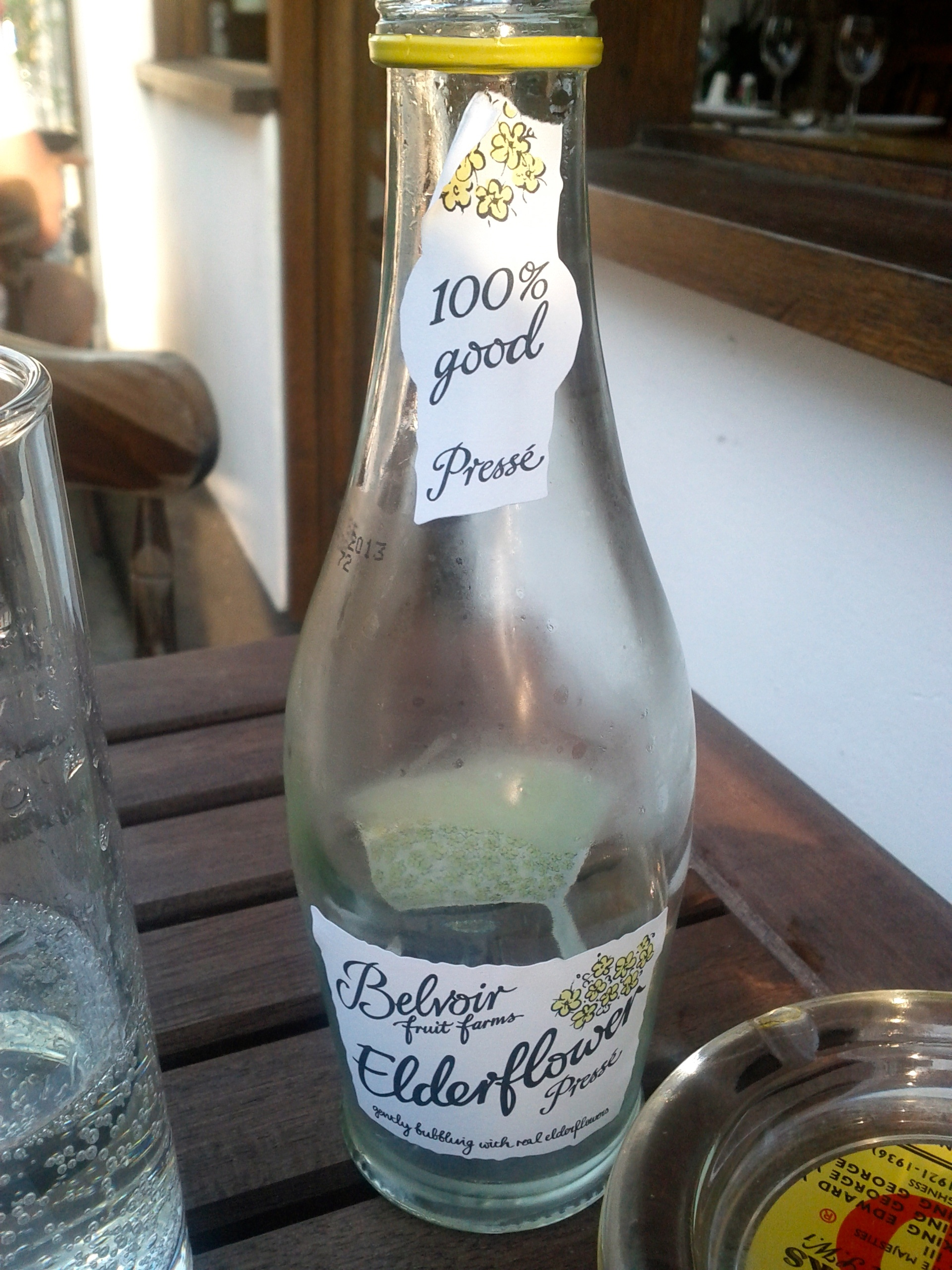
Elderflower pressé made by Belvoir Farm

Belvoir Farm, pronounced /bɛl/ vwaʁ sounding like vwar, is a British soft drinks company based in Bottesford, Leicestershire. It was founded in 1984 by John Manners, whose family who as of 2025 continue to own it. Its products include elderflower cordial and elderflower pressé.
