= Cidona =

Irish soft drink

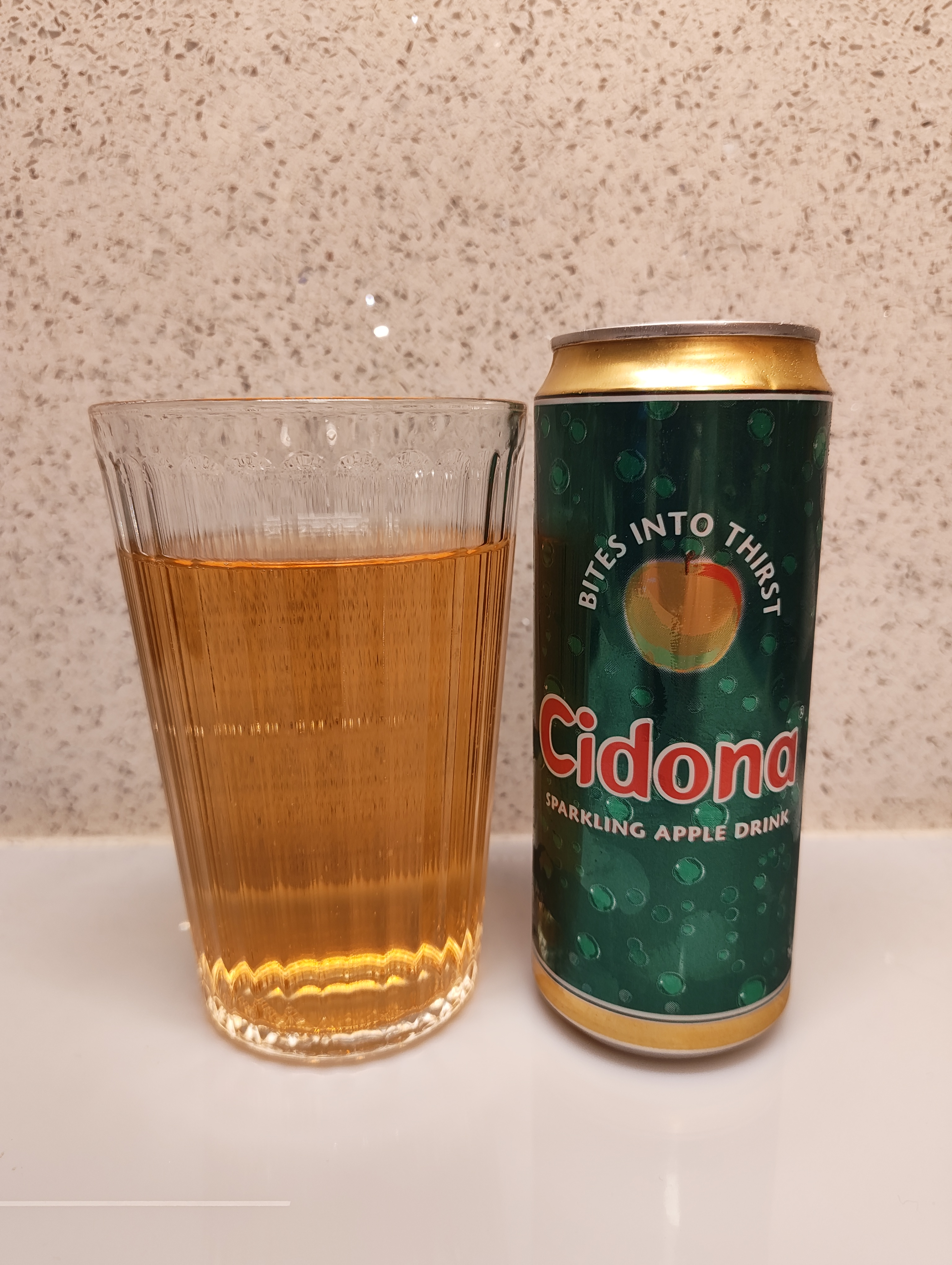
- A glass of Cidona with a can
- Type: Soft drink
- Manufacturer: Britvic
- Introduced: 1955

Cidona is an Irish apple-based soft drink that has been on sale since 1955. It is popular in Ireland and has some sales in the United Kingdom.

== History ==
It was initially produced by cider producers Bulmers (part of C&C) from 1955, and comes in a distinctive green bottle. Cidona was one of a wide range of Irish-made soft drinks, known in Ireland as "minerals" that were developed in the mid-20th century.

Cidona is now part of Britvic Ireland following the sale of C&C's soft drink segment in 2007. Britvic Ireland continues to produce Cidona alongside other Irish soft drinks including Club and TK.

== UK version ==
In 1940, it was being advertised in the UK Radio Times by H. P. Bulmer as 'The newest, non-alcoholic, sparkling apple drink' and priced at 10 pence for a 'big 5 glass flagon'.
