= Purdey's =

Natural energy drink

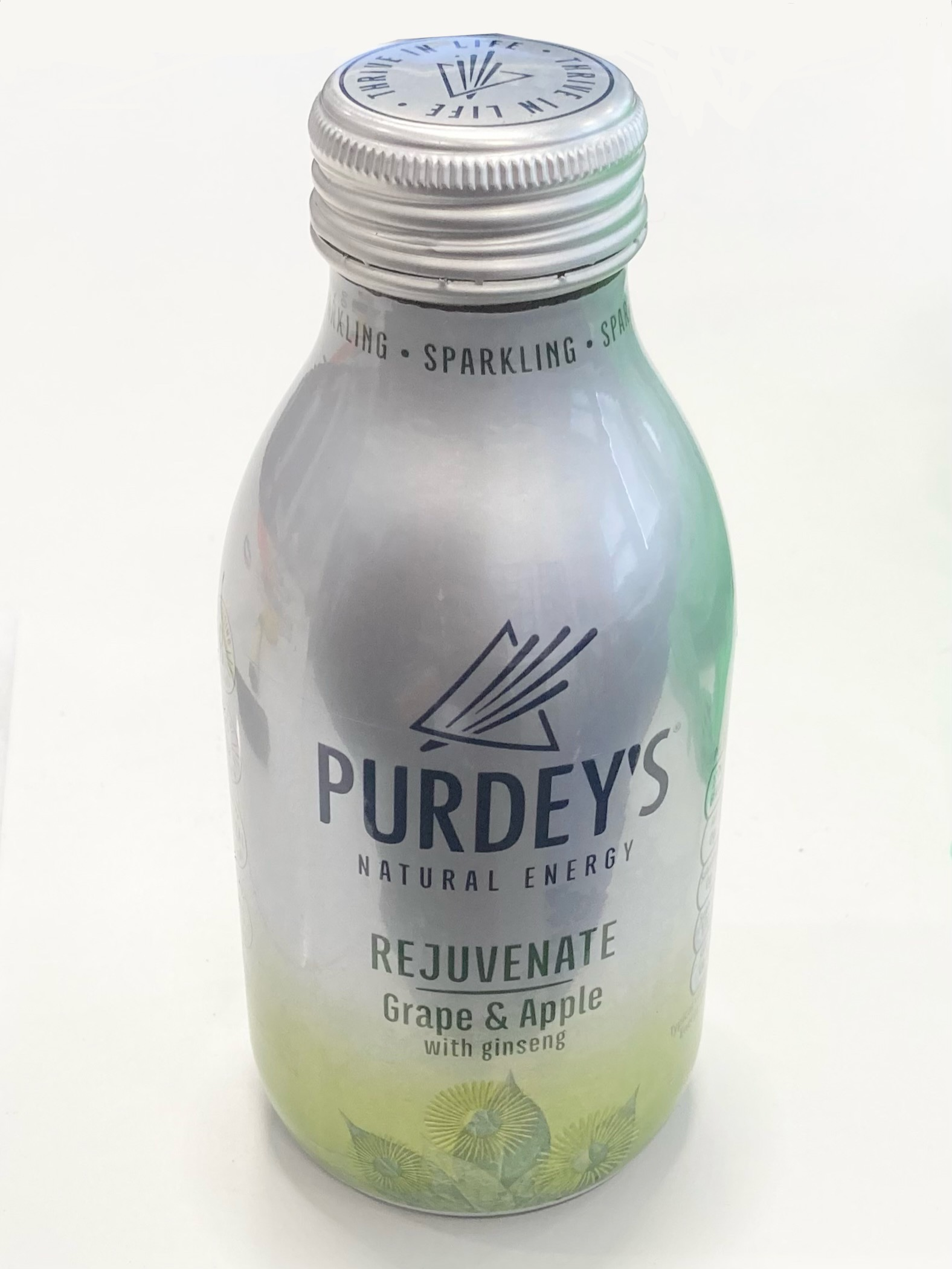
- Bottle of Purdey's Rejuvenate as sold in the United Kingdom
- Type: Energy drink
- Manufacturer: Britvic
- Origin: United Kingdom
- Introduced: January 19, 1992; 34 years ago
- Variants: See Varieties
- Website: Official website

Purdey's is a soft drink produced by Orchid Drinks Ltd. which was acquired by Britvic in 2000. It is sold in the United Kingdom, Ireland, Australia, the Netherlands and Belgium. It is sold in 330ml brown glass bottles with a silver or black plastic label that covers the whole bottle.

== Varieties ==
- Purdey's Rejuvenate (formerly known as Active Life) - This has a blend of grape (25%) and apple (8%) juices with botanical extracts, including damiana, oak bark, and ginseng (0.04%); and is sold in a silver-wrapped brown bottle with green accents.
- Purdey's Refocus - This has a blend of grape (25%), apple (8%), blackberry (1%), and sloe (1%) juices with botanical extracts; and is sold in a silver-wrapped brown bottle with purple accents.
- Purdey's Replenish - This has a blend of apple (23%) and raspberry (2%) juices with botanical extracts; and is sold in a silver-wrapped brown bottle with pink accents.

=== Discontinued ===
- Purdey's Edge - This had a blend of dark fruit juices, no added sugar, and was sold in a dark bottle.
- Purdey's Activation (formerly known as Active Body) - This was marketed as a healthy energy drink, contained a combination of sugars, and was sold in a gold bottle.
