= Ballygowan water =

Brand of mineral water

Coordinates: 52.4501°N 9.0646°W

- Ballygowan water's current logo
- Founded: 1981; 45 years ago
- Founders: Geoff Read and Richard Nash
- Headquarters: Dublin, Ireland
- Area served: Ireland; United Kingdom
- Products: Bottled water Water coolers
- Owner: Britvic
- Website: ballygowan.ie

Ballygowan is an Irish brand of mineral water. It is bottled at Newcastle West in County Limerick, near its source at the site of a reputed holy well used by the Knights Templar. Ballygowan is the leading water brand in the Irish market.

The company was founded by Geoff Read in 1981, who launched a marketing and distribution joint venture in 1984 with Richard Nash, a soft drink manufacturer. Anheuser-Busch took a stake in 1987, which was bought back in 1989. In 1993, Ballygowan was bought by Cantrell and Cochrane (now C&C), which sold its non-alcoholic brands to Britvic in 2007. The 1993 deal involved Nash selling the source but retaining part of the source area, which it later used for its own rival spring water brand.
