= Top Deck (drink) =

British brand of beverages

Top Deck was a range of low alcohol shandy drinks marketed to children in the United Kingdom from the 1960s to the 1980s. The product was introduced by Idris & Co., who were later acquired by the Beecham Group. In 1986 the brand was sold, along with the more popular Tango and the UK franchises for Pepsi and 7-Up, to Britvic.

All three Top Deck flavours were sold in silver cans, with the initial can design based on Idris’s own Shandy product. Each flavour had a signature colour (seen as a boxout background on the first can design, later the text of that flavour).

The three flavours were:

- Limeade & Lager (Green)
- Lemonade Shandy (Yellow)
- Lemonade & Cider (Orange)

The alcohol content was listed on the cans as less than 1.2% (2° proof).
