= R. White's =

British brand of carbonated lemonade

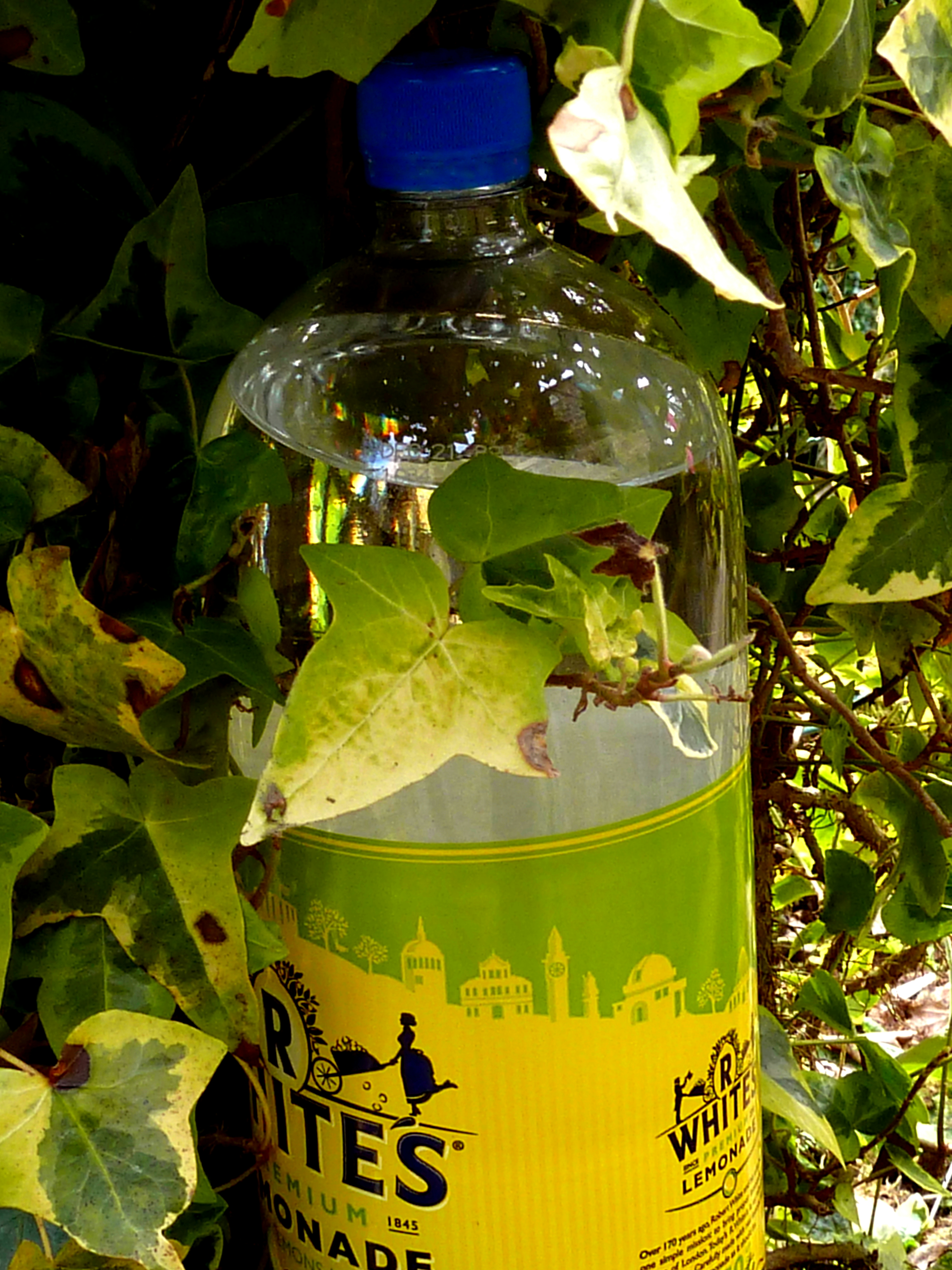
- R. White's lemonade, est. 1845
- Type: Carbonated lemonade
- Manufacturer: Britvic
- Origin: United Kingdom
- Introduced: 1845; 181 years ago
- Related products: Tango

R. White's is a British brand of carbonated lemonade, which is produced and sold in the United Kingdom by Britvic. Robert and Mary White produced the first R. White's lemonade in Camberwell, south London, in 1845. The business saw rapid expansion by the late 1860s, and the White Family took over H. D. Rawlings Ltd. in 1891, the year that it was incorporated—a merger which made H. D. Rawlings the biggest soft drinks company in London and the south-east—and then R. White & Sons Ltd. was itself incorporated in 1894. The company was taken over by Whitbread in 1969, and in 1980 it was merged with Bass's soft drink business to form Britannia Soft Drinks. In 1986, Allied Lyons merged the soft drink business, Britvic, into Britannia. In 2005, Britvic became a public company, and in 2025 was purchased by the Carlsberg Group.

In the 1970s R. White's also made orangeade, dandelion and burdock, and cream soda. The lemonade product, formerly made using sugar, has (as of 2012, possibly earlier) changed the traditional recipe, replacing some sugar with aspartame, saccharin and acesulfame K. R. White's still contains real lemons and is available in regular, diet, Traditional Cloudy, Raspberry, Pear and Elderflower varieties. A television commercial from the 1970s, "Secret Lemonade Drinker", was ranked seventh in a 2000 UK wide poll of "The 100 Greatest TV Ads".

== History ==
In 1845, Robert and Mary White started selling home-brewed ginger beer from a wheelbarrow in Camberwell, London under Robert White's name. As a nod to this heritage, today the wheelbarrow features in Britvic's packaging of R. White's drinks. The business saw rapid expansion, and by the late 1860s it had five production units and 16 depots in the Midlands of England and London. One of the first mass produced soft drink brands, White's was producing 600,000 bottles per day. White's, who had concentrated on lemonade, took over H. D. Rawlings Ltd, a company that specialised in mixers, and the merger made White's the biggest soft drinks company in London and south-east England. Robert White's sons, Robert James and John George, joined the business, and they became R. White & Sons Ltd.

By 1887, White's produced a range of flavours and products, all of which were sold in Codd’s glass bottles. Choices available included strawberry soda, raspberry soda, cherryade, cream soda, pineapple cider, ginger beer, soda water and orange champagne. Prices ranged from eightpence to a shilling per dozen. At the beginning of the 20th century more than 40 different soft drink flavours were on sale.

In 1914, during the First World War, over 100 R. White employees served in the armed forces and the company supplied the government with over half their horses and vans. In the Second World War, a great part of the vehicle fleet was commandeered by the government and used by the army. During the Blitz three major factories were wiped out in London alone.

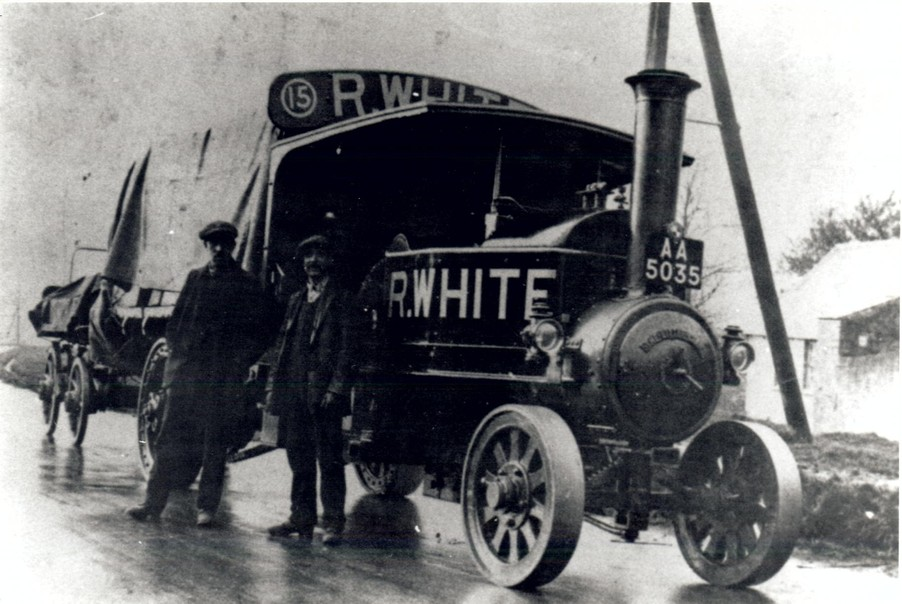
R. White's delivery haulage (pre-1914)

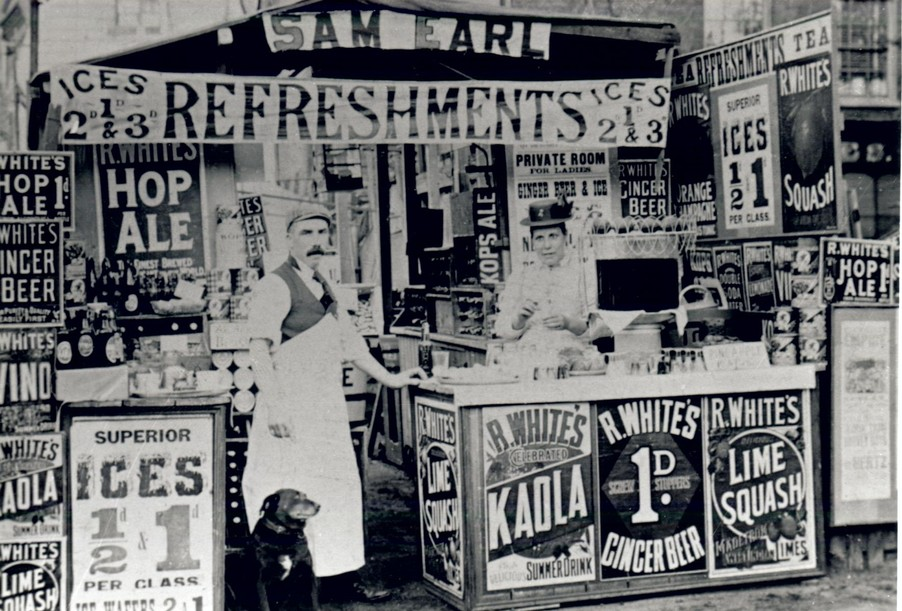
R. White's refreshments (early 1900s)

== Marketing ==
In 1973, the 'Secret Lemonade Drinker' advertising campaign was launched by London agency Allen, Brady and Marsh and devised by Rod Allen, who wrote the slogan. The adverts featured actor Julian Chagrin in pyjamas creeping downstairs to raid the fridge for R. Whites Lemonade, only to be caught by his wife, played by Harriet Philpin. Ross McManus wrote and sang the advert's song, with his son Declan McManus (later known as Elvis Costello) providing the backing vocals. An alternative, unaired version of the advert featured Costello and his father onstage, as the 'Secret Lemonade Drinker' fantasised about being a rock star.

The commercials were the brand's best known advertising campaign and continued to air until 1984 and won a silver award at the 1974 International Advertising Festival. There was also a version of the commercial in 1985 featuring John Otway as the secret lemonade drinker in a phone box.

The secret lemonade drinker was reintroduced in 1993, starring actor and comedian Julian Dutton as the eponymous Secret Lemonade Drinker, and various celebrities have featured in the commercials including comedians Ronnie Corbett and Frankie Howerd, actor Nicholas Parsons, tennis player John McEnroe (who had two versions) and footballers turned pundits Ian St John and Jimmy Greaves. One version dubbed the advert entirely in Japanese; another version had another sultry woman (played by Yolanda Vázquez) appear randomly to kiss Dutton (before he is rejoined by his wife, now played by Julie Dawn Cole), while yet another featured the animation of Mr Benn, with the voice of original narrator Ray Brooks. In 2000, “Secret Lemonade Drinker” was ranked seventh in Channel 4's poll of "The 100 Greatest TV Ads". Julian Chagrin and Harriet Philpin returned in 2012 to advertise R White's Lemonade Lollies.

== See also ==
- List of lemonade topics
