= MiWadi =

Irish soft drink brand

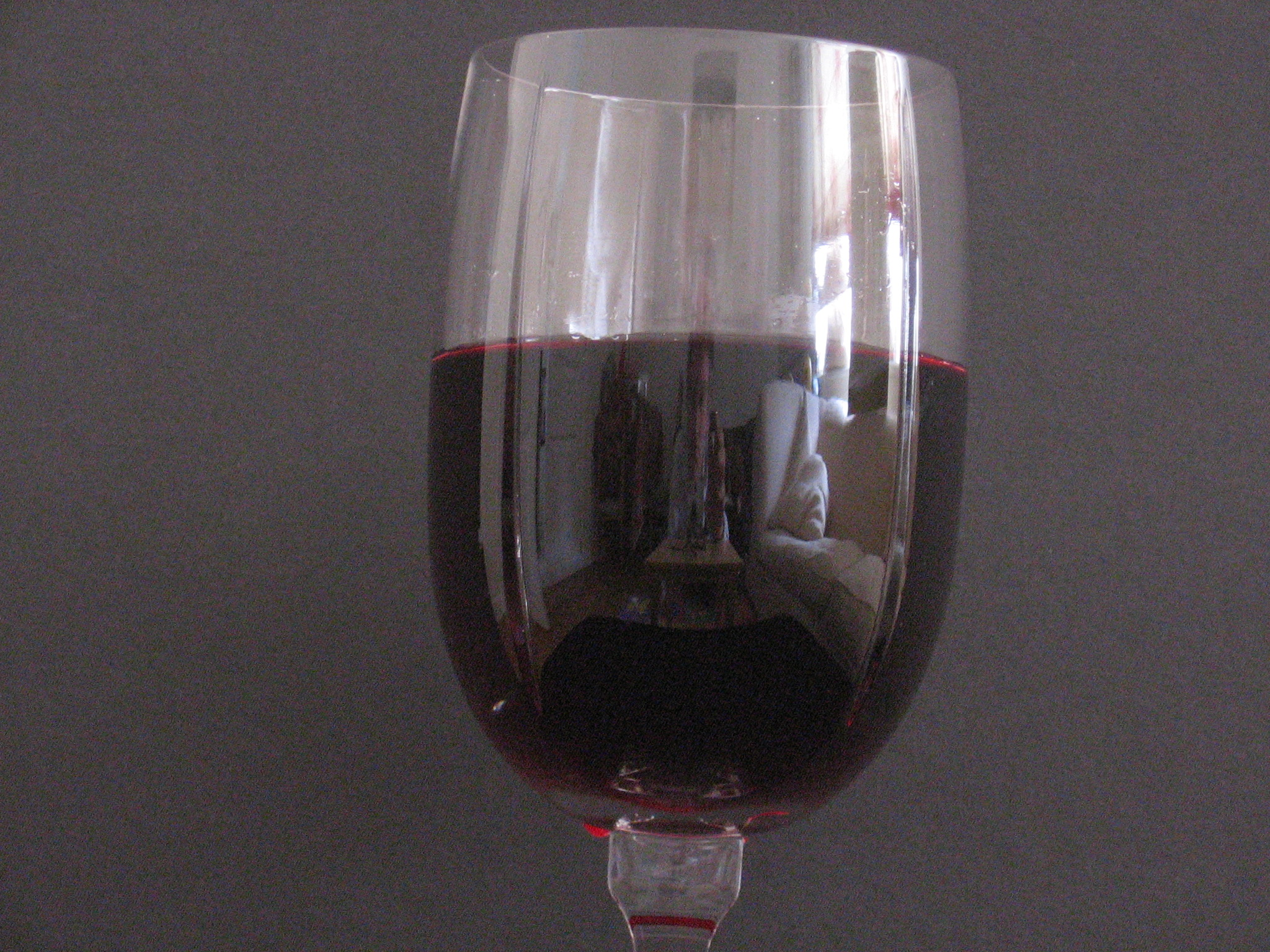
- The blackcurrant variant of MiWadi poured into a wine glass for demonstration purposes.
- Type: Soft drink
- Manufacturer: Britvic Ireland
- Origin: Ireland
- Introduced: 1927
- Variants: Orange; Apple; Blackcurrant; Summer Fruits; Apple & Blackcurrant; Orange & Pineapple; Tropical; Lime; Lemon
- Website: miwadi.ie

MiWadi is a juice concentrate brand sold in the Republic of Ireland and Northern Ireland, owned by Britvic Ireland, and formerly by Cantrell and Cochrane (C&C), bottled in Dublin, Cork and Belfast.

Its name comes from the initial letters of C&C's predecessor company, Mineral Water Distributors, which was formed in 1927. The range includes blackcurrant, lemon, lime, and orange & pineapple fruit squashes, with additional flavours produced on a seasonal basis, such as peppermint, and clove. The user is expected to dilute it 5 parts water per 1 part juice before drinking.

The slogan of MiWadi is "It's not your Wadi, it's MiWadi", seen on MiWadi bottles and commercials. The drink suffered declining sales during the 1990s, occupying only 16.4% of the market share by 1995, but it experienced a sales renaissance in the 21st century and as of 2005 it accounted for 37% of fruit squash sold in the Irish market.

== MiWadi Mini ==
In August 2016 MiWadi launched a new sucralose-based product designed to make twenty 250ml drinks from a pocket-sized container
