= Cordial (medicine) =

Drink valued for its medicinal or restorative properties

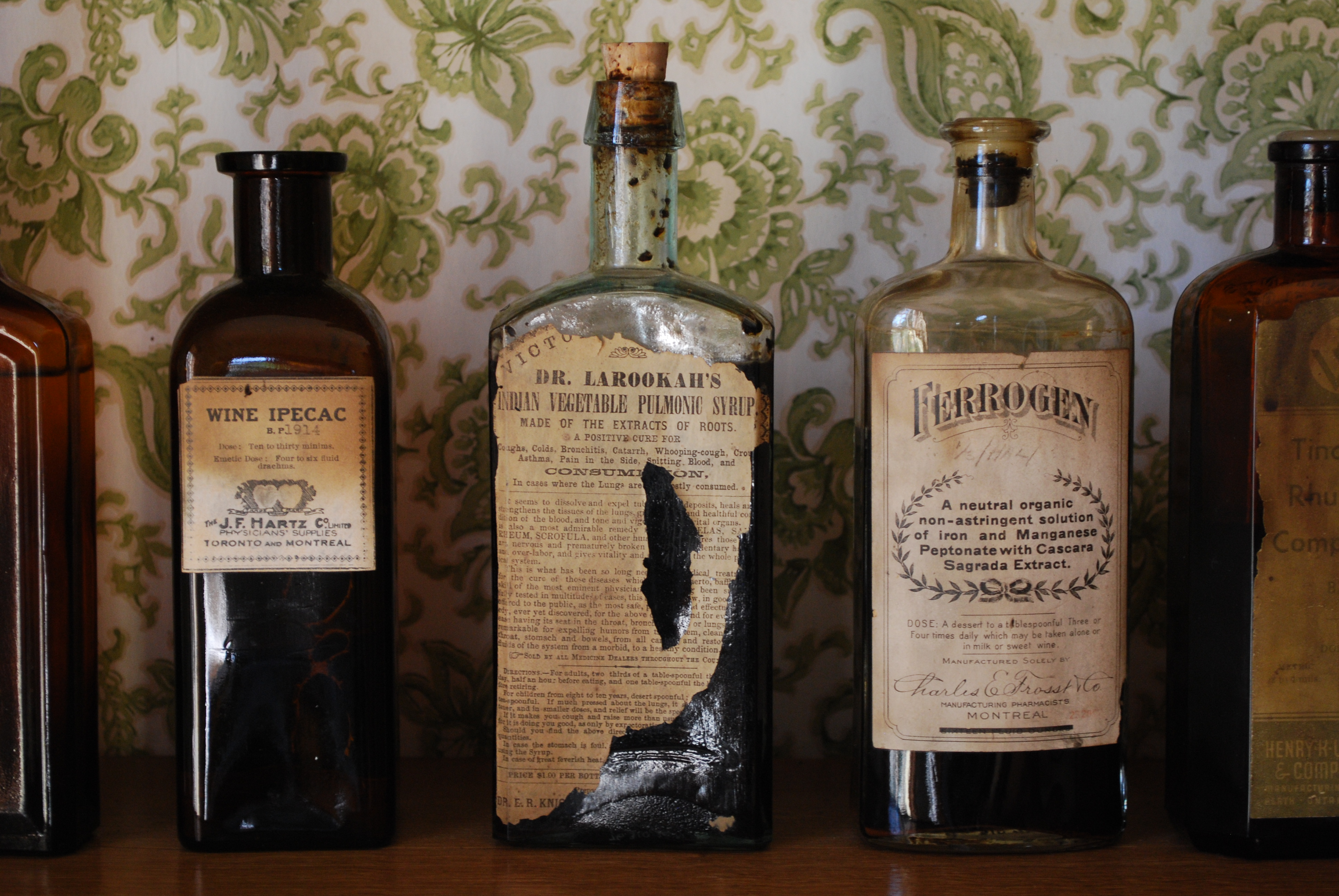
Old apothecary bottles of the kind once used for cordials.

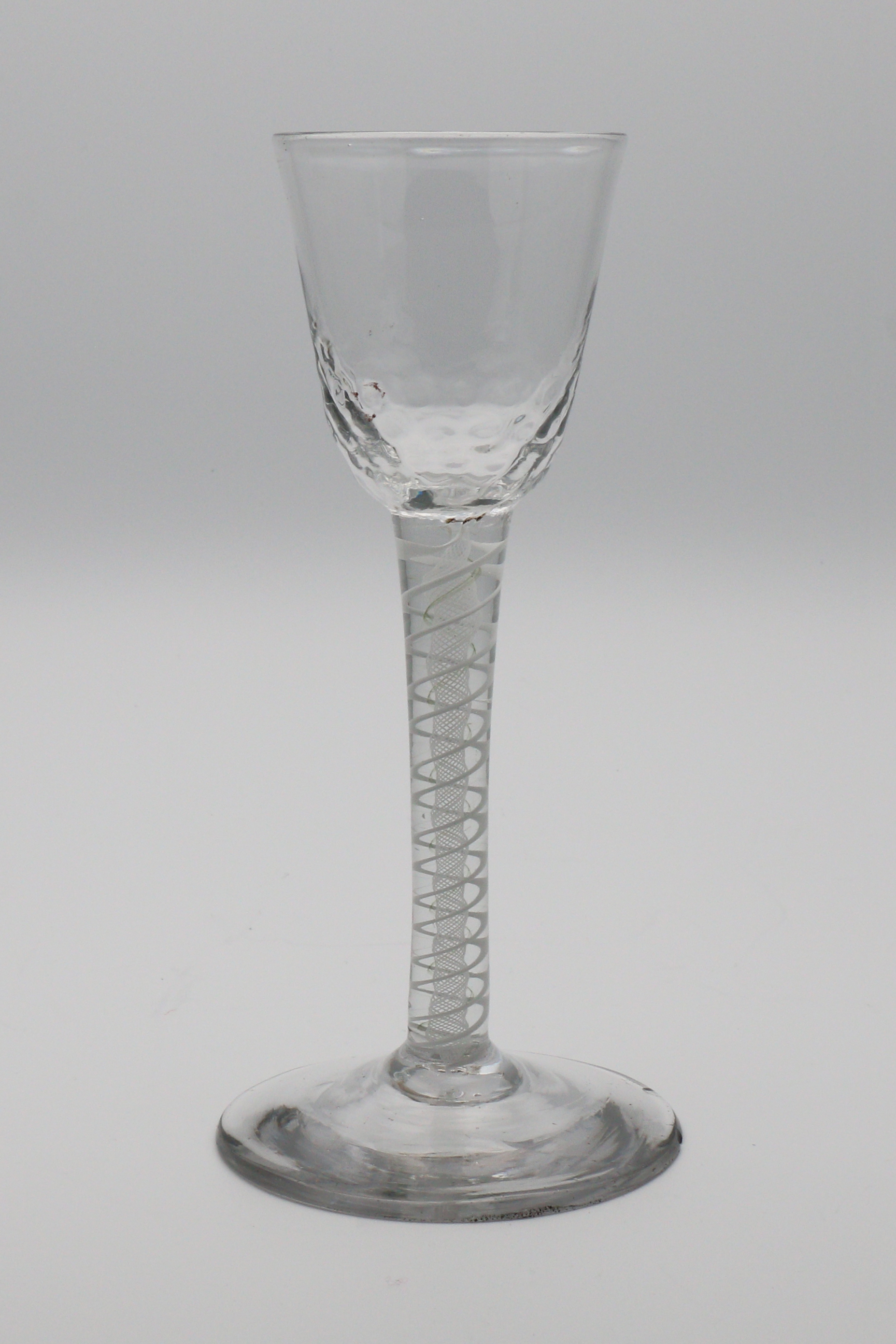
Air twist cordial glass c. 1750

A cordial is any invigorating and stimulating preparation that is intended for a medicinal purpose. The term derives from an obsolete usage. Various concoctions were formerly created that were believed to be beneficial to one's health, especially for the heart (cor in Latin).

Some cordials, with their flecks of gold leaf and bright yellow hue, took their name from the "cordial virtues" of the rays of the sun, which some alchemists thought they contained.

== History ==
Most cordials were of European origin, first produced in Italian apothecaries during the Renaissance, where the art of distilling was refined during the 15th and 16th centuries. It is from this origin that cordials are frequently referred to in French as Liqueurs d'ltalie, it is also from this that we have liqueurs. From the Renaissance onwards, cordials were usually based on alcohol in which certain herbs, spices or other ingredients were allowed to steep. The first cordials arrived in England in the late 15th century and were called distilled cordial waters. These were strictly used as alcoholic medicines, prescribed in small doses to invigorate and revitalise the heart, body and spirit as well as cure diseases. By the 18th century cordials were being imbibed for their intoxicating effects and medicinal virtues, and were fast becoming recreational drinks, eventually evolving into liqueurs.

Though cordials originated on the continent, a number of British "sweet drams" achieved popularity in Europe.

== Uses ==
Cordials were used to renew the natural heat, recreate and revive the spirits, and free the whole body from the malignity of diseases. Many cordials were also considered aphrodisiacs, a view which encouraged their consumption in a social as opposed to a medical context. Other early varieties of alcoholic cordials were flavoured with spices and herbal ingredients which were thought to settle the stomach after excessive eating. These cordials were called surfeit waters, which were specifically created for treating overindulgence.

Precious ingredients like gold, pearls and coral were sometimes added. These were believed to revive the spirit and to preclude disease.

== In fiction ==
Father Christmas gives Lucy Pevensie a bottle of magical cordial before the Battle of Beruna in C. S. Lewis's The Lion, the Witch and the Wardrobe. It was said to be made from the juice of Fire-Flowers that grew in the mountains of the sun, with a single drop curing almost any illness or injury, bringing people back from the brink of death in some cases. The use of the word "cordial" by the author was archaic even at the time.

In J. R. R. Tolkien's The Fellowship of the Ring, Gandalf offers miruvor (or "Cordial of Imladris"), a reviving drink given to him by Elrond, to the Company of the Ring when they’re on Caradhras.

== Popular cordials ==
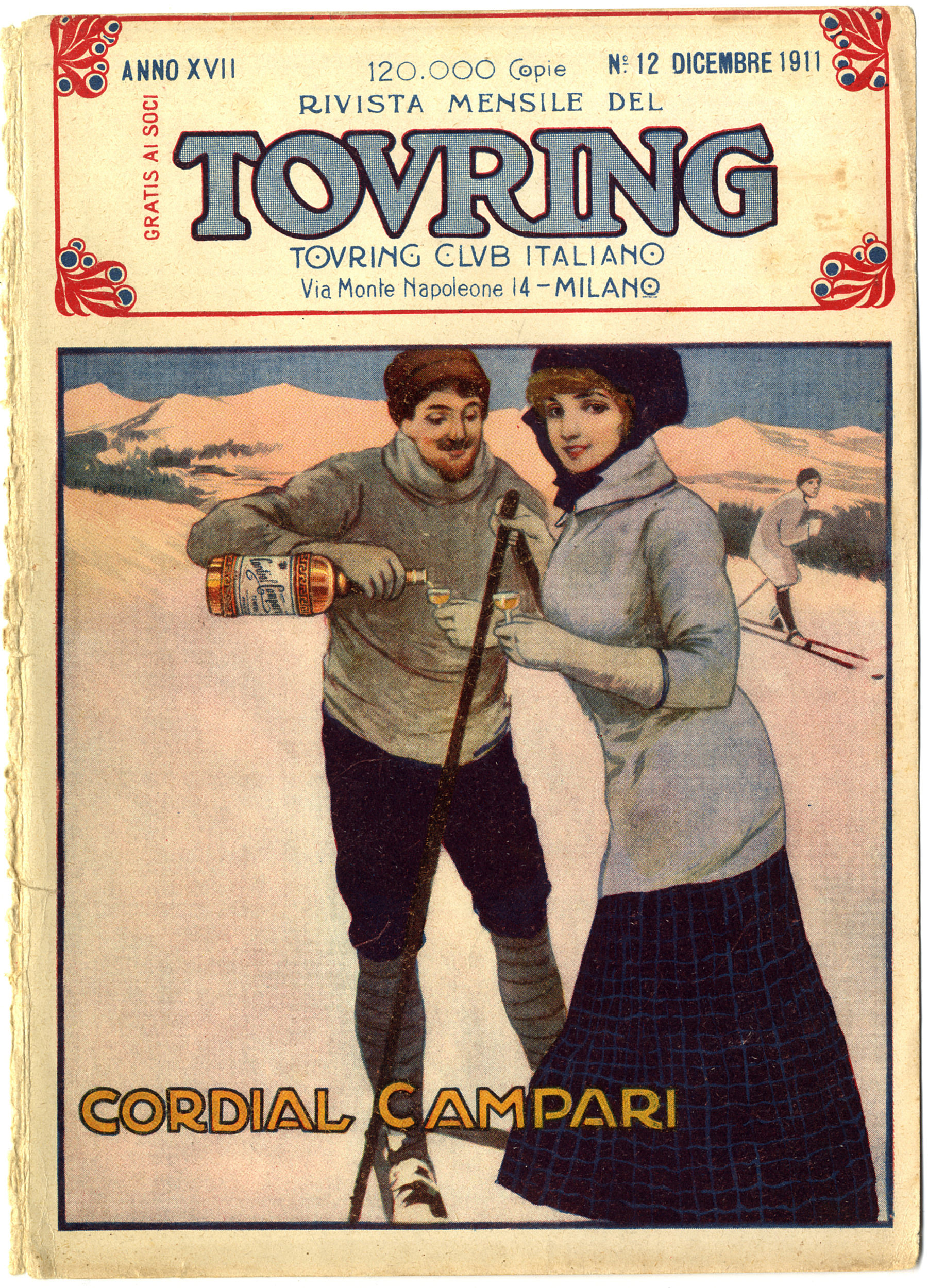
Advertising illustration for the Cordial Campari in the Touring Club Italiano monthly magazine, 1911.

- Rosa Solis or Rosolio, probably originating in Renaissance Turin was derived from the carnivorous sundew plant. It was believed to not only invigorate the heart, but to be an aphrodisiac as well; according to the 17th century medical writer William Salmon, sundew "stirs up lust".
- Royal Usquebaugh was a spicy concoction containing flecks of gold leaf thought to capture the sun's golden radiance. It was usually flavoured with aniseed, liquorice and saffron and sweetened with fruit sugar extracted from figs and raisins by maceration. The name derives from the Irish uisce beatha, which is literally the Gaelic translation of Latin aqua vitae, 'the water of life'). The word whisky is also derived from the Irish uisce beatha, but this was not the same as the cordial consumed in 17th and 18th century England and France, and bore no resemblance to the spirit we now call whisky.
- Escubac d'Angleterre, a more down-market relative of Royal Usquebaugh without the flecks of gold leaf, but was nevertheless a popular drink.
- Vespetrò, another popular liqueur of Italy (speciality of the town of Canzo), flavoured with anise, angelica and lemon.

== See also ==
- Elixir
- Squash
- Tincture
