= Britvic =

British producer of soft drinks

Britvic Limited
- Type: Private
- Industry: Soft drinks
- Founded: 1938; 88 years ago
- Fate: Acquired by Carlsberg Group, merged with Carlsberg Marston's to create Carlsberg Britvic
- Successor: Became a subsidiary of Carlsberg Britvic
- Headquarters: Hemel Hempstead, England, UK
- Products: Licensee: 7Up; Mountain Dew; Pepsi; Gatorade; Lipton
- Brands: J_{2}O; R. White's; Tango; Robinsons; Club; MiWadi; Purdey's; Cidona
- Revenue: ▲£1,899 million (2024 - plc)
- Operating income: ▲£250.9 million (2024 - plc)
- Net income: ▲£125.8 million (2024 - plc)
- Number of employees: 4,808 (2024 - plc)
- Parent: Carlsberg Britvic
- Website: britvic.com

Britvic Limited is a British producer of soft drinks based in Hemel Hempstead, Hertfordshire. It produces soft drinks under the Britvic name, including the famous Britvic Orange, as well as several other brands. The original Britvic Company was founded during the 1930s as the British Vitamin Products Company, but had initially been started in a chemists in Chelmsford during 1850. In 1968 it became part of Allied Breweries, before being merged into Britannia Soft Drinks, a company jointly owned by Allied, Bass and Whitbread in 1986.

The company has been the UK licence holder for Pepsi and 7 Up since 1987. It was listed on the London Stock Exchange (LSE) from 2005 and expanded into non-UK markets from 2007, until it was acquired by the Carlsberg Group in July 2024. Carlsberg's UK operations were merged with Britvic plc, becoming Carlsberg Britvic in January 2025, with Britvic Ltd being a wholly-owned subsidiary of the new business.

== History ==
=== Origins ===
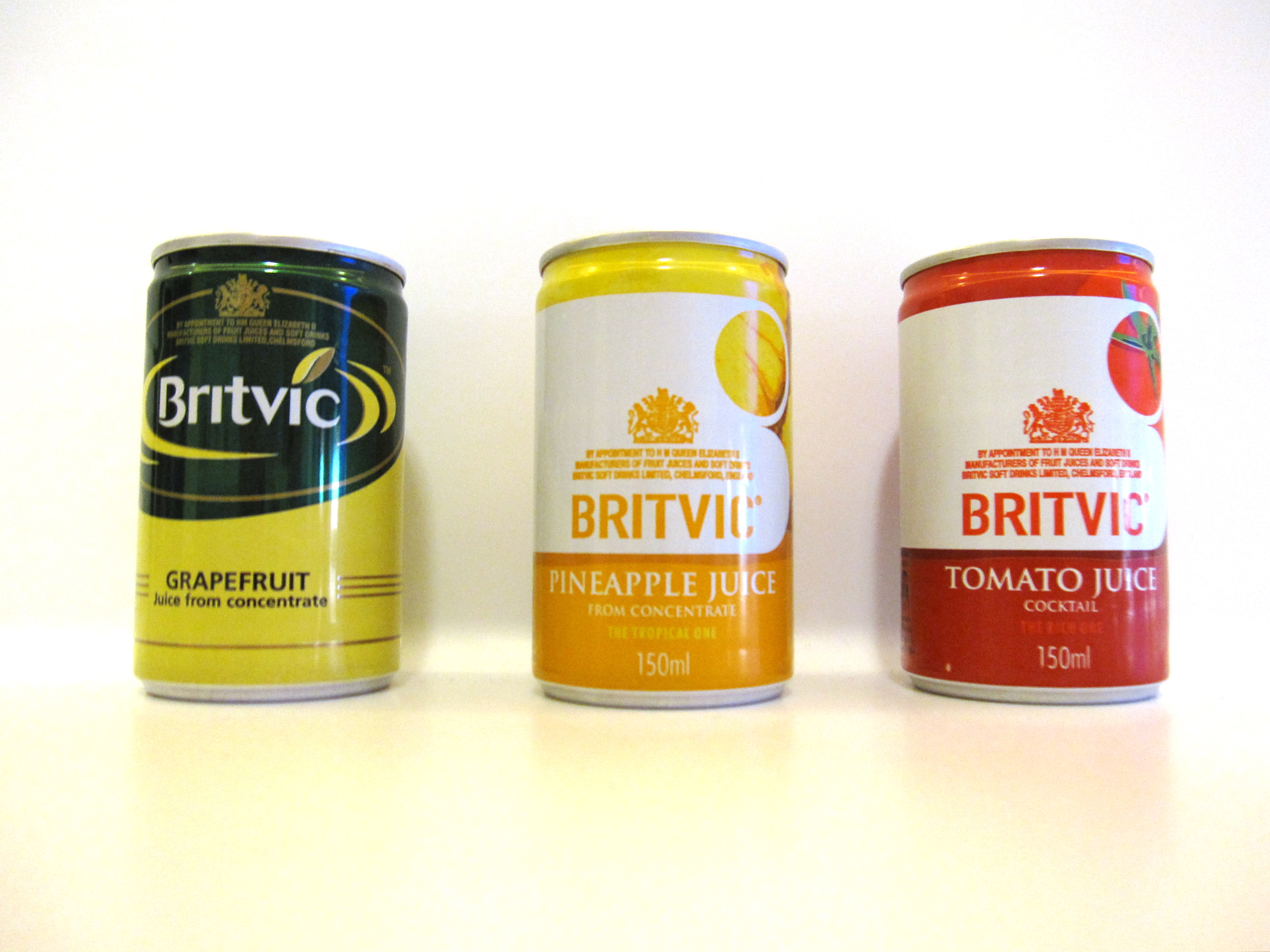
Canned fruit juices by Britvic (2011)

The company originated in 1850, when staff in a chemist's shop in Tindall Street, Chelmsford, began making health tonic drinks as a sideline. During the 1930s, the shop owner Ralph Chapman developed a way to add Vitamin C and sugar to fruit juices that helped preserve the juice from deteriorating and provide a health drink, which were sold in small glass bottles. Chapman sold the company in 1938 to James McPherson who coined the name British Vitamin Products Company for these products and founded the company. The company registered the trademark for the Britvic name in 1941. By 1950, the company was making non-alcoholic Britvic juices and squashes plus the ASP alcoholic tomato cocktail brand. Two years later, advertising agency Auger & Turner, applied on behalf of the British Vitamin Products Company to the Postmaster General, to produce their first television commercial, however commercial television did not appear until 1955, by which time advertising agency Albert Pemberton had created the new advertising stream. During 1951, the company introduced Gold, a new drink that could be mixed with Gin. The company used the ballerina Nanci Crompton in their advertising at this time.

=== Vine Products arrival ===
In 1954, the company started work on a new factory in Chelmsford at the cost of £380,000 with its landmark clock tower, which would replace several units that were spread across Chelmsford. In the same year the business was acquired by wine and sherry manufacturers Vines Products. The company expanded into the vending machine business during 1954, offering businesses chilled Britvic fruit juices with a straw. Vine Products company meeting in 1956 stated that the sales of fruit juices had reached a new high. The sales record was beaten in 1957, and Britvic started a trial in selling tinned fruit products. By 1958, however sales had dropped but the company could announce that they had sold 10 million cans of tinned fruit and had launched two new drink products, Cherry B and Hawaiian Punch. The following year, it was announced that the tinned fruit operation had been transferred to John Dorrell & Co, who would use the Britvic name under licence, and that sales of fruit juices, including a new Blackcurrant B line was strong. By 1961, Vine Products were announcing that sales of Britvic products had grown even though it had been a poor summer in 1960.

=== Under Showerings & Allied ===
Vines agreed a three-way merger with Showerings of Shepton Mallet and Whiteways Cider in 1961, with Britvic becoming one of the combined company's products alongside Babycham; Whiteway, Coates and Gaymers ciders and Duval Wines. In 1968, the company became a subsidiary of Allied Breweries after its £108 million purchase of Britvic's parent, Showerings, Vines Products and Whiteways. The company changed its name to Britvic in 1971, with British Vitamin Products Company becoming a holding company for all of Allied's soft drink businesses. In the same year drinks author, John Doxat declared in his publication Drinks and drinking: an international distillation that Britvic was the best producer of bottled fruit juice in Britain.

In 1978, the company expanded internationally by creating Britvic-Deutschland GmbH which launched at Internorga, while it gained the soft drink operations of J. Lyons and Co. after its merger with Allied in 1978. The company first started producing drinks under licence in 1982 with the introduction of Dr Pepper. In 1985, Allied-Lyons agreed to a share swop which would see Castlemaine-Tooheys receive 50% of the stock in Britvic for exchange of 6.15 million shares, 5% of the Australian firm, which Allied already owned 15% of. However, following a three way takeover battle for Castlemaine-Toohey, Allied-Lyons sold their shareholding to the Bond Corporation, and bought back the 50% in Britvic held by the Australian firm.

=== Britannia Soft Drinks ===
In 1986, Allied merged its British Vitamin Products Company division into Britannia Soft Drinks, a company created in 1980 by Bass and Whitbread to manage their soft drink businesses. The merger saw Britvic come together with Canada Dry Rawlings and the R. White's Lemonade brand. Britannia acquired the Corona Soft Drinks Company from Beechams in 1987 for £120 million, which included the brands, Tango, Quosh, Idris, Hunts and Top Deck, with Britvic becoming Britvic Corona. PepsiCo, which had lost its UK partner, Cadbury-Schweppes to Coca-Cola, purchased 10% of Britvic from Britannia in exchange for the licence to bottle Pepsi and 7 Up in the UK. By 1987, the company had 20% of the market share, only second to Coca-Cola Schweppes. In 1990, the Monopolies and Mergers Commission investigated if the large soft drink bottlers, Coca-Cola Schweppes and Britvic had pushed out smaller competitors, by restricting what retailers could sell by exclusive supply agreements, which the commission found as an illegal practice in 1991.

In response to a slowing in sales of Tango, a new advertising campaign was launched in 1992, called You know when you have been Tango'd, with sales increasing by 30% the month after it was launched, it saw the drink reach number 3 in the soft drinks chart behind Coca-Cola and Pepsi. The company announced a fall of profits by 20% in 1993 to £6 million. During 1994, there was persistent rumours that Bass was going to sell its shares to PepsiCo but nothing came from it. Britvic launched still Tango in June 1994, but after poor sales the product was withdrawn from the market just 5 weeks later, however, in the same year through a partnership with Unilever and PepsiCo, they created Liptonice in response to the launch of Snapple. In 1995, Britannia bought Robinson's from Unilever for £103 million, who sold the brand as part of its purchase of the Reckitt & Colman food business. The company's profits dropped during 1995, however, by the end of 1996 they had jumped up by 9% to £50 million. This may have been helped by a deal with Perrier, whose products Britvic distributed, although the company had pulled out of the partnership with Unilever for distributing Liptonice. But by 1998 the profits had dropped again, down by 28% to £38 million, not helped by having to withdraw 2.25 million cans from sales as carbon dioxide provided by Terra Nitrogen had been found to contain benzene.

The company launched J_{2}O in 2000. During 2000 it was reported that the majority shareholders, Bass, Allied-Domecq and Whitbread in Britannia had instructed Schroder Salomon Smith Barney to manage an auction for the business. PepsiCo and A.G. Barr both were rumoured to purchase the business, however, the auction was cancelled in 2001, after Britannia and PepsiCo could not agree on any of the offers made. The company grew by purchasing Orchid Drinks, manufacturer of Purdey's and Aqua Libra for £20 million in 2000. Red Devil Energy Drink UK and Irish licence was purchased from entrepreneur Clive Garrad in 2002, with Britvic closing its own energy drink brand, Carbon, which had been created in 2000, transferring the production from Holland to Chelmsford. It was reported that in 2003, the company had made operating profits of £83m on a turnover of £674 million.

In 2004, Pepsi agreed to swap its 10% share in Britvic for a 5% in Britannia Soft Drinks, which was agreed so Britvic could be floated on the stock market, and agreed a new 15 year contract with Britvic, which now included Gatorade. Britannia Soft Drinks and Britvic were merged in October 2004 prior to the flotation. The newly merged company was split between InterContinental Hotels (formerly Bass) 47.5%; Whitbread 23.75%; Pernod Ricard (who had purchased Allied) 23.75%; PepsiCo 5%. The company announced profits of £78.7 million on £700 million of sales in October 2005, while announcing in November a flotation of the company managed by Citibank and Deutsche Bank. Prior to the flotation, Britvic purchased the water division from rival Ben Shaw, who manufactured Pennine Spring.

=== PLC ===
In December 2005, the company underwent an initial public offering (IPO). On the first day of trading in Britvic plc, the value of the company shares was £494m. The share offer was bigger than first planned, with 181 million shares sold after Pernod Ricard and Whitbread agreed to sell their full holdings, while 3,000 employees received £750 shares each. A week after the flotation, InterContinental sold their remaining 10.7% shares in Britvic. In 2006, Britvic launched Gatorade in the UK, after securing the rights to do so from PepsiCo, as well as it own brand of bottled water called drench. In October 2006, Britvic stated that it had been in discussion with private equity firm Permira, but no formal bid had been received. In December that year, Permira purchased 9.2% of the shares in Britvic, making it the largest shareholder, which saw its share price rise from 263p to 281p. Prior to the share purchase, Britvic had announced a 43% drop in profits to a pre-tax value of £36.5 million.

In May 2007, the Company bought the soft drinks and distribution businesses of Ireland's Cantrell & Cochrane (C&C) for £169.5m, however, the company announced that it was ending its use of reusable glass bottles. Britvic introduced Gatorade to the UK market in 2008. The company in November 2008 announced that they had made pre-tax profits of £50.4m, an increase of 14% on a turnover of £926.5m, which was an improvement on the pre-tax profit of £43.03m in 2007. In May 2009, Permira sold its 14% shareholding in Britvic for £81 million, giving up on its attempt to purchase the business. Further growth was seen in 2009, with pre-tax profits up 23% at £86.5 million. In May 2010, Britvic launched a UK specific version of the popular drink, Mountain Dew Energy. It tastes similar to its American counterpart, but has a lower caffeine and sugar content. During June 2010, Britvic started to expand into Europe by purchasing French business Fruité Entreprises. In December 2010, the company announced that profits were up 21.5% at £109.1m from a turnover of £1.14b, but had to write down £104m in value from its Irish business.

On 14 November 2012, the company announced plans to merge with Scottish soft drink producer A.G. Barr, the maker of brands including Irn-Bru and Tizer, which would have created one of Europe's largest soft drinks companies. The company's profits however dropped from £105.1m to £84.4m, mainly due to a recall on Robinsons Fruit Shoots which cost the business £16.9m. By February, the merger was put into serious doubt after the Office of Fair Trading referred it to the Competition Commission. On 11 July 2013, A.G. Barr chairman, Ronnie Hanna, announced that the proposed merger had been abandoned.

In May 2017, PepsiCo announced that it had decided to sell its long-held 4.5 per cent stake in Britvic. The company lost the Royal Warrant in 2022 after the death of Elizabeth II. In 2023, ready-to-drink iced coffee brand, Jimmy's Iced Coffee was purchased by Britvic.

=== Carlsberg ===
On 8 July 2024, it was announced that the Danish Carlsberg Group would buy Britvic for £3.3 billion. The purchase was reviewed by the Competition and Markets Authority in October, but on the 17 December they cleared the deal. Unite the Union stated that Carlsberg's planned £100m of savings over 5 years would lead to 100s of job losses, mainly in the UK. The transaction was approved by the court on 15 January 2025, which allowed Carlsberg UK business, Carlsberg Marston, to be merged with Britvic plc, to create Carlsberg Britvic. The new company became the biggest PepsiCo drink licenser in the world. The new group operate Britvic Ltd as a subsidiary company that produces and bottles the soft drinks.

== Operations ==
=== United Kingdom ===
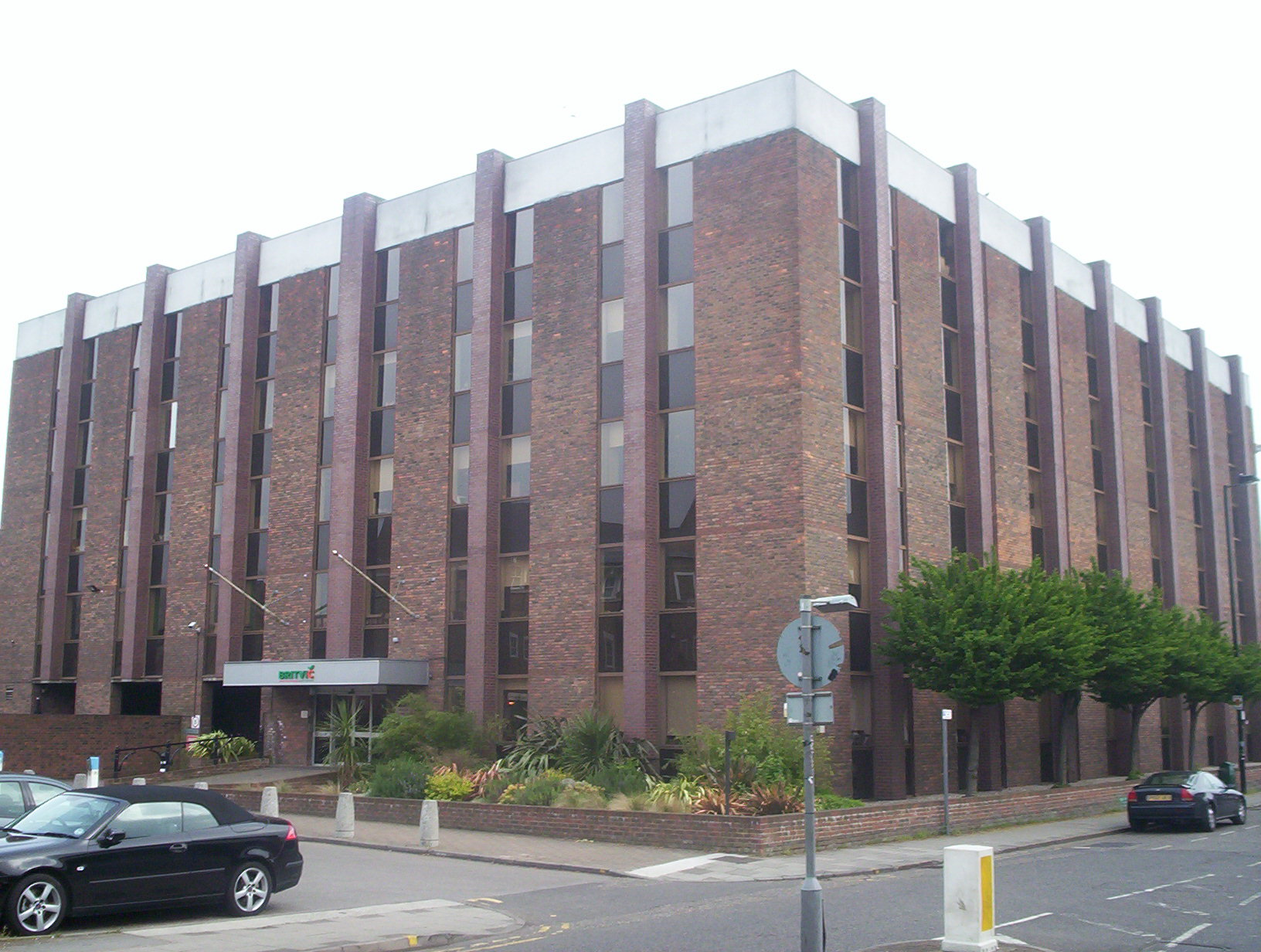
Britvic House, the former Britvic headquarters in Chelmsford

The corporate headquarters were moved from Chelmsford, Essex to Hemel Hempstead, Hertfordshire, in March 2012, while its Chelmsford plant closed in 2014, ending the company's long association with the city. The company also closed its Huddersfield plant that produced Pennine Spring in the same year. The company closed the Robinson's factory in Norwich in 2018.

As of 2024, the company's UK operated sites in Rugby, London, Leeds, Lutterworth, Solihull and Tamworth.

=== Ireland ===
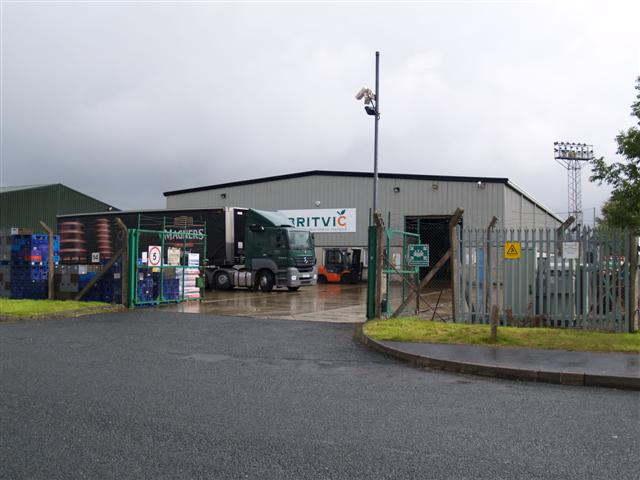
Britvic facility in Gortrush Industrial Estate in Northern Ireland (2008)

After their failed IPO C&C's sold their soft drink brands to Britvic, resulting in the company now owning a number of brands in the Republic of Ireland and Northern Ireland, including, Ballygowan Water, Britvic, Cidona, MiWadi, and Energise Sport as well as the rights to the Pepsi and 7 Up brands in the territory through its bottling agreements with PepsiCo.

=== France ===
Britvic bought Fruité Entreprises in May 2010 for £298 million. It has since been renamed Britvic Teisseire International. It is mainly a fruit juice business, unlike the GB&I businesses that focus on soft drinks.

=== Brazil ===
In 2015, Britvic acquired ebba (Empresa Brasileira de Bebidas e Alimentos SA), located in São Paulo, and in 2017 Bela Ischia, located in Rio de Janeiro. In 2023, it expanded its Brazilian brands further by purchasing Extra Power energy drink, Flying Horse energy brand, juice brand Juxx and smoothie brand Amazoo from Global Bev. In November 2026, it was announced that Carlsberg Britvic would sell its Brazilian operations to Grupo José Augusto Vieira for a sum of €80 million US$90 million.

== Current brands ==
Current brands are as follows:

Dilutes

- Robinsons
- BritviC
- MiWadi (Ireland)
- Ebba (Brazil)
- Dafruta (Brazil)
- Maguary (Brazil)

Water

- Aqua Libra
- Arto LifeWTR
- Ballygowan
- Drench

Carbonated soft drinks

- Tango
- Club (Ireland)
- Purdey's
- Britvic 55
- London Essence Company
- R. White's Lemonade
- TK (Taylor Keith) Lemonade (Republic of Ireland)
- C&C Lemonade (Northern Ireland)
- Energise (Ireland)
- Cidona

Other

- Bela Ischia (Brazil)
- Energise Sport (Ireland)
- Amé
- J_{2}O
- J_{2}O Spritz
- Fruité (France)
- Maguary (Brazil)
- Maguary Fruit Shoot (Brazil)
- Moulin De Valdonne (France)
- Natural Tea (Brazil)
- Pressade (France)
- Puro Coco (Brazil)
- Robinsons Fruit Shoot
- Robinsons Fruit Shoot Hydro
- Robinsons Fruit Shoot Juiced
- Robinsons Refresh’d
- Robinsons Fruit Creations
- Robinsons Squash’d
- Teisseire (France)
- Teisseire Fruit Shoot (France)
- Teisseire Fruit Shoot Au Jus (France)

Licensed from PepsiCo

- 7 UP
- Pepsi
- Lipton Ice Tea
- Sobe V Water
- Mountain Dew Energy
- Gatorade (Great Britain)
- Rockstar Energy
