= Balgowan, Dundee =

Area of Dundee, Scotland

Coordinates: 56.496759°N 2.998905°W

Balgowan: Scottish Gaelic: Baile Ghobhainn
- Location within Dundee City council area Location within Scotland
- OS grid reference: NO386343
- Council area: Dundee City
- Lieutenancy area: Dundee
- Country: Scotland
- Sovereign state: United Kingdom
- Post town: DUNDEE
- Postcode district: DD3
- Dialling code: 01382
- Police: Scotland
- Fire: Scottish
- Ambulance: Scottish
- UK Parliament: Dundee West
- Scottish Parliament: Dundee City West

Balgowan is an area of Dundee, Scotland. The name derives from the Scottish Gaelic Baile Ghobhainn, meaning "blacksmith's stead" (cf also Govan in Glasgow from the same Celtic root).
