= Robinsons (drink) =

English fruit drink brand

- Product type: Drink
- Current owner: Britvic
- Country: United Kingdom
- Introduced: 1935
- Previous owners: Robinson Family (until 1903); J & J Colman (until 1935); Reckitt & Colman (until 1995)
- Tagline: Real Fruit in Every Drop
- Website: robinsonssquash.co.uk

Robinsons is a British fruit drink brand, now manufactured by Britvic Ltd, a subsidiary of Carlsberg Britvic, that has been produced for over 200 years, predominantly offering fruit cordials, known as squash in British English. The Robinsons range includes Squash, Fruit Shoot, Barley Water and Fruit Creations.

Robinsons sales for 2022 (across all its ranges) totalled nearly £200 million and it was assessed that half of British households bought their products, with more than 9 million glasses of their drink consumed daily.

== History ==
The company was founded in 1823 by George Robinson and Alexander Belville as Robinson and Belville Ltd, originally as a shipping and trading company, but which also manufactured Patent Barley and Groats. As an 11-year-old, Mary Ann Robinson began to sell homemade fruit juices from her family's farm in the historic Lancashire town of Droylsden. George Robinson left the business in 1859 and Mary-Ann, who later married James Nichols, continued to develop the business over the next few decades. In 1825, Matthias Robinson, discovered the use of barley crystals and initially began producing barley water as a health drink. This original product quickly gained popularity and became known for its refreshing taste and purported health benefits.

Throughout the years, Robinsons expanded its product line to include a wide variety of drinks, catering to different tastes and preferences. Robinsons Squash was created by Fred Robinson in the 1930s, who developed a way to make fruit squash using freshly squeezed fruit juices; its introduction to the market marked a significant milestone for the brand, as it became a household name and an iconic part of British culture.

=== Historical timeline ===
- 1862, Robinson & Belville Ltd amalgamated with Keen & Sons to become Keen Robinson & Company.
- 1903, Keen Robinson & Company was acquired by J & J Colman, the mustard producer based in Norwich. Colman's merged with Reckitt & Sons in 1938, becoming Reckitt & Colman. In 1925 the Company moved production to Carrow near Norwich, where it produced its products until 2019.
- 1930, Mr Eric Smedley Hodgson developed a drink combining Robinsons' patent barley crystals with real lemon juice and sugar, which became Lemon Barley Water and was marketed with its association with the Wimbledon Tennis Championships from 1935 onwards.
- 1955, Robinsons was appointed with a Royal Warrant by Her Majesty Queen Elizabeth II, as supplier of soft drinks to the British Royal household.
- 1995, Unilever purchased the food business of Reckitt & Colman, selling on the Robinsons business to Britannia Soft Drinks, the parent company of Britvic for £108 million.
- 2000, Fruit Shoot launched.
- 2012, Britvic recalled packs featuring the 'spill proof Magicap' design due to concerns over packaging safety.
- 2015, Robinsons removed all 'added sugars' from its squash product ranges.
- 2022, Robinsons' deal with the Wimbledon Tennis Championships ended.
- 2023, Robinsons conducted a comprehensive rebranding of its product range to appeal to modern families.
- 2024, Carlsberg agrees to acquire Britvic plc in a £3.3 billion take over.

== Wimbledon ==
Robinsons had a long-standing association with the Wimbledon tennis tournament, dating back to 1935. Robinsons became the official supplier of soft drinks for the tournament, with their Robinsons Barley Water becoming a beloved staple at Wimbledon. The drink was originally introduced to provide hydration to players during matches.

Over the years, Robinsons' presence at Wimbledon grew, with their branding prominently displayed throughout the event. After 86 years, the official sponsorship between Robinsons and Wimbledon ended in 2022. The decision was made by the All England Lawn Tennis Club, which organises the tournament, as they sought to explore new opportunities and partnerships for the event.
