= Strongarm =

Strongarm may refer to:

- StrongARM, a RISC microprocessor created by Digital Equipment Corporation
- Strongarm (band), a hardcore band from Florida
- Strongarm, a beer produced in England since 1955 by Camerons Brewery
- Strongarm (Masters of the Universe), a fictional character from the Masters of the Universe franchise
- Strongarm (Transformers), several fictional characters from the Transformers robot superhero franchise (both male and female).
