= G. ehrenbergii =

G. ehrenbergii may refer to:

- Galium ehrenbergii, a herbaceous plant
- Gliricidia ehrenbergii, an ornamental tree
