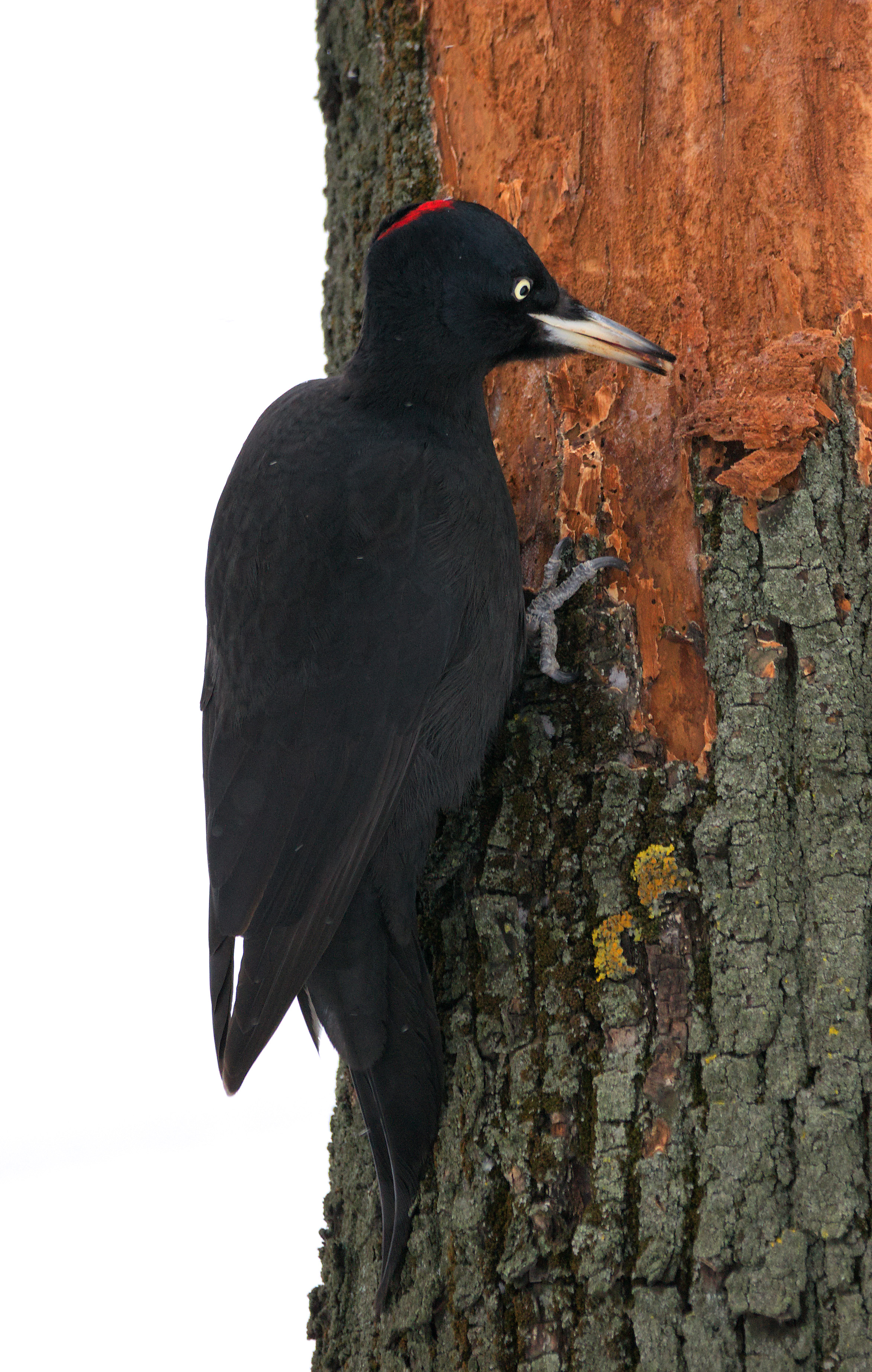
- Adult female

Conservation status
- Least Concern (IUCN 3.1)

Scientific classification
- Kingdom: Animalia
- Phylum: Chordata
- Class: Aves
- Order: Piciformes
- Family: Picidae
- Genus: Dryocopus
- Species: D. martius

Binomial name
- Dryocopus martius (Linnaeus, 1758)
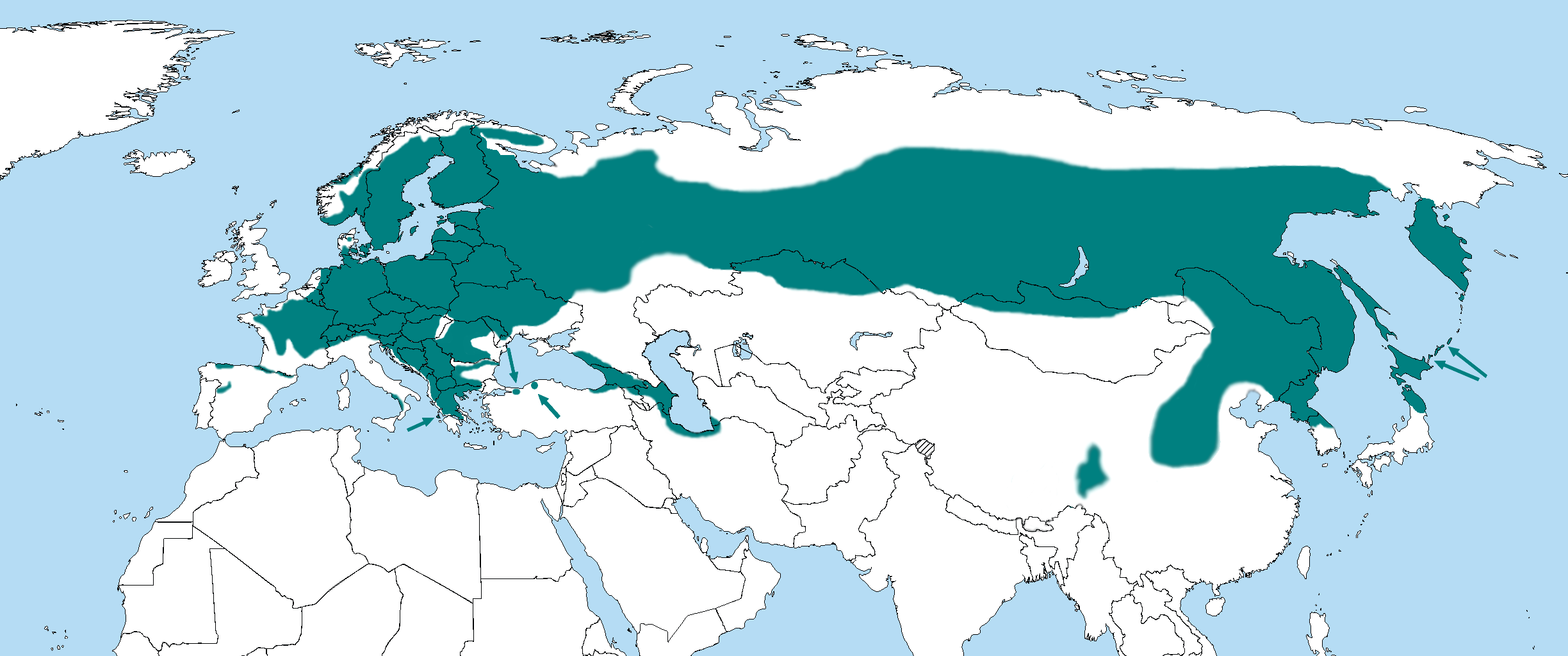
- Black woodpecker range

Synonyms
- Picus martius Linnaeus, 1758

= Black woodpecker =

Species of woodpecker

Black woodpecker drumming

Black woodpecker calls

The black woodpecker (Dryocopus martius) is a large woodpecker that lives in mature forests across the northern Palearctic. It is the sole representative of its genus in that region, and its range is expanding. The black woodpecker is easily the largest woodpecker species in Europe as well as in the portion of Asia where it lives and is one of the largest species worldwide. This non-migratory species tends to make its home in old-growth forest or large forest stands and excavates a large tree hole to reside in. In turn, several species rely on black woodpeckers to secondarily reside in the holes made in trees by them. This woodpecker's diet consists mostly of carpenter ants. This species is closely related to, and fills the same ecological niche in Europe as, the pileated woodpecker of North America and the lineated woodpecker of South America, also being similar to the white-bellied woodpecker which is distributed to the south somewhat of the black woodpecker in Asia.

== Taxonomy ==
The black woodpecker was formally described by the Swedish naturalist Carl Linnaeus in 1758 in the tenth edition of his Systema Naturae under the binomial name Picus martius. Linnaeus gave the locality as Europe, but this is now taken to be Sweden. The black woodpecker is now placed in the genus Dryocopus that was introduced by the German naturalist Friedrich Boie in 1826.

Two subspecies are recognised:

Image	Subspecies	Distribution
	D. m. martius (Linnaeus, 1758)	western Europe to the Kamchatka Peninsula and Japan
	D. m. khamensis (Buturlin, 1908)	Tibet and southwestern China

== Description ==
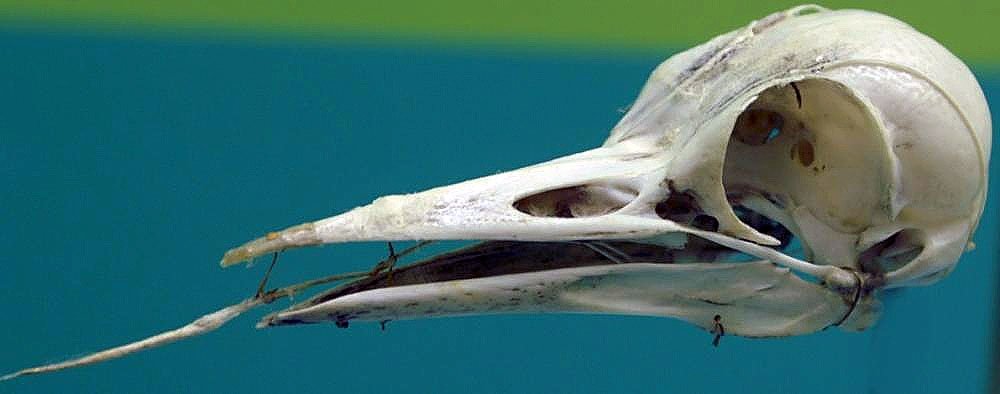
Skull of a black woodpecker

The black woodpecker measures 45 to 55 cm (18 to 22 in) long with a 64 to 84 cm (25 to 33 in) wingspan. Body weight is approximately 250 to 400 g (8.8 to 14.1 oz) on average. Among standard measurements, the wing chord is 22.7 to 26 cm (8.9 to 10.2 in), the tail is 15.9 to 17.3 cm (6.3 to 6.8 in), the very long bill is 5 to 6.7 cm (2.0 to 2.6 in) and the tarsus is 3.6 to 4 cm (1.4 to 1.6 in). It is easily the largest woodpecker in its range and is second in size only to the great slaty woodpecker amongst the woodpecker species certain to exist (with the likely extinction of the largest and second largest woodpeckers), although its average mass is similar to that of the Magellanic woodpecker of South America. The closely related pileated and white-bellied woodpeckers also broadly overlap in size with the black woodpecker, but both are somewhat smaller in average and maximal size and mass. The plumage of this crow-sized woodpecker is entirely black apart from a red crown. In males, the entire crown is red, but in females only the top hindcrown is red, with the rest of the body all black. The juvenile black woodpecker is similar but is less glossy, with a duller red crown and a paler grey throat and bill . The piercing yellow eyes and manic, high-pitched calls of the black woodpecker have made it the villain of fairy tales throughout its range. Their voice is remarkable in that it has two different calls. One is a short single high-pitched note, a loud, whistling kree-kree-kree, done only twice in a row. The other is a screech-like shrill while in flight. Unlike other woodpecker species, the black woodpecker does not have a dipping, bounding flight, but instead flies with slow, unsteady-seeming wing beats with its head raised.

== Distribution and habitat ==
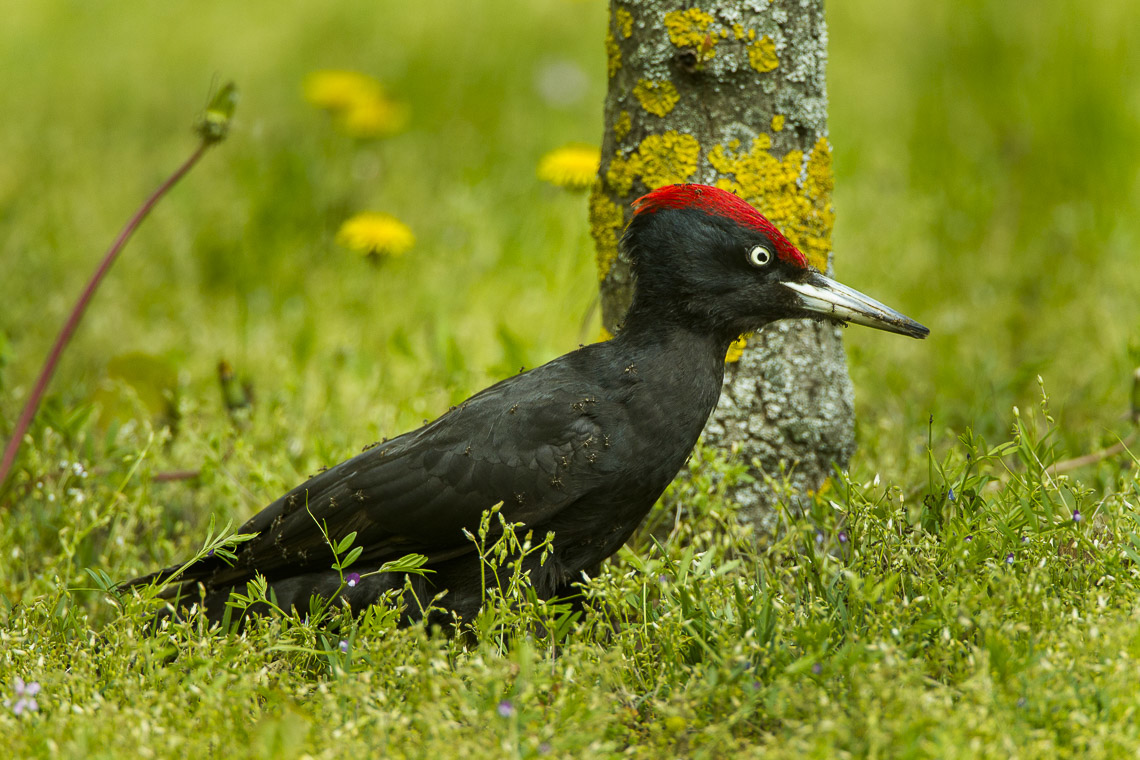
A black woodpecker taking anting bath in Hungary

The range of the black woodpecker spreads east from Spain across the whole of Europe, excluding Great Britain, Ireland, and northernmost Scandinavia. It is also native to parts of Asia, including Korea, Japan and China, and to the Middle East, including Iran and Kazakhstan. The southern limits of this woodpecker's range are in Spain and Italy, and it has also been recorded as a vagrant in Portugal. The species is generally more uncommon and more discontinuous in distribution in the Asian part of its range.

The black woodpecker is mainly found in forested regions, with a preference for extensive, mature woodland, including coniferous, tropical, subtropical and boreal forests. It is very widespread throughout mountainous and lowland forests. It is more likely to occur in marginal woods near human habitations during the non-breeding season. This species has been observed at elevations between 100 and 2,400 m (330 and 7,870 ft).

The black woodpecker is noticeably absent from the British Isles. Approximately 80 sightings of the species in the UK have been reported, but some of these are disputed, though the proximity of the British Isles to the species' range in Western Europe means that the species may cross over on a regular basis.

== Behaviour and ecology ==
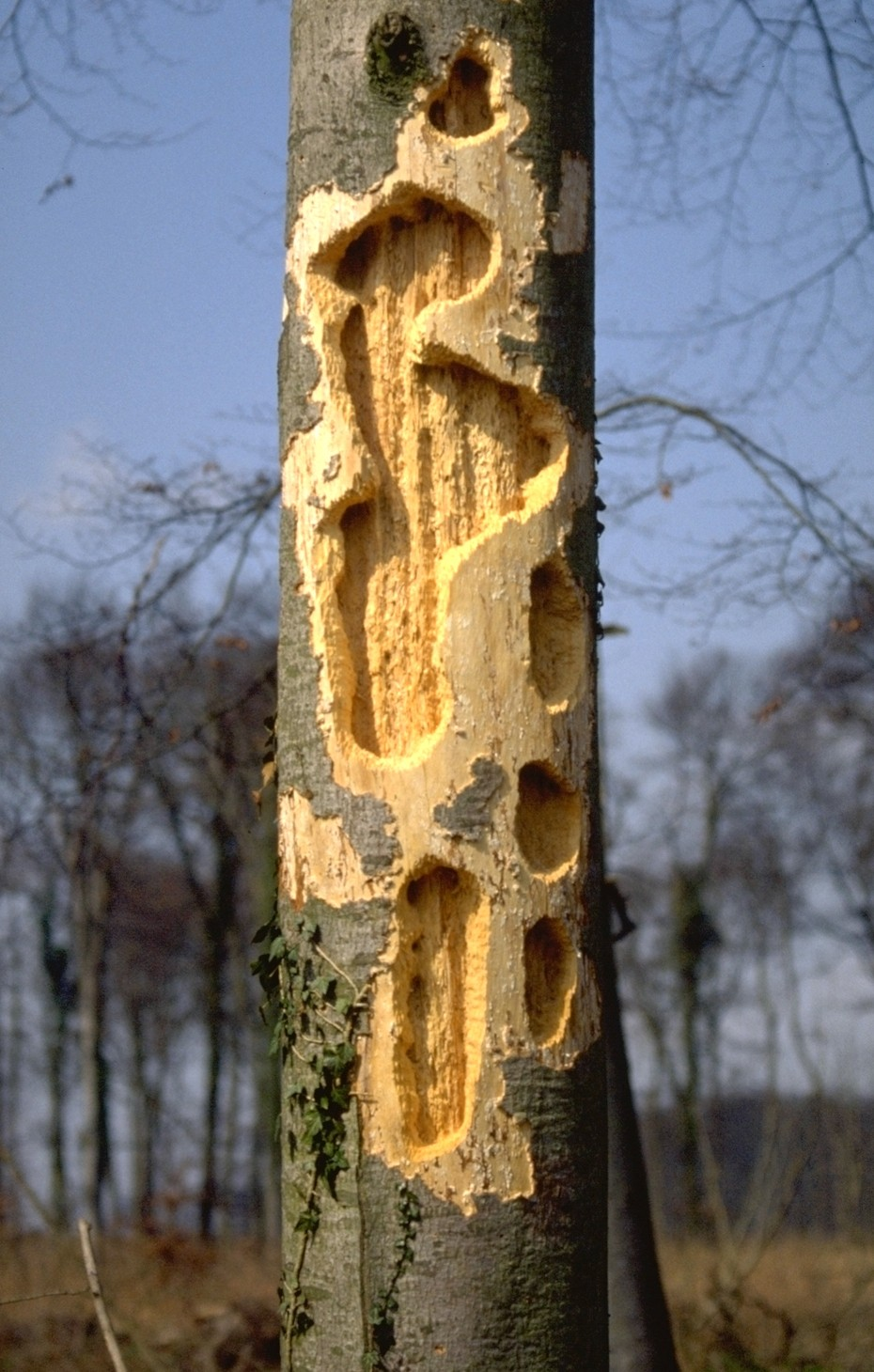
Tree work by black woodpecker

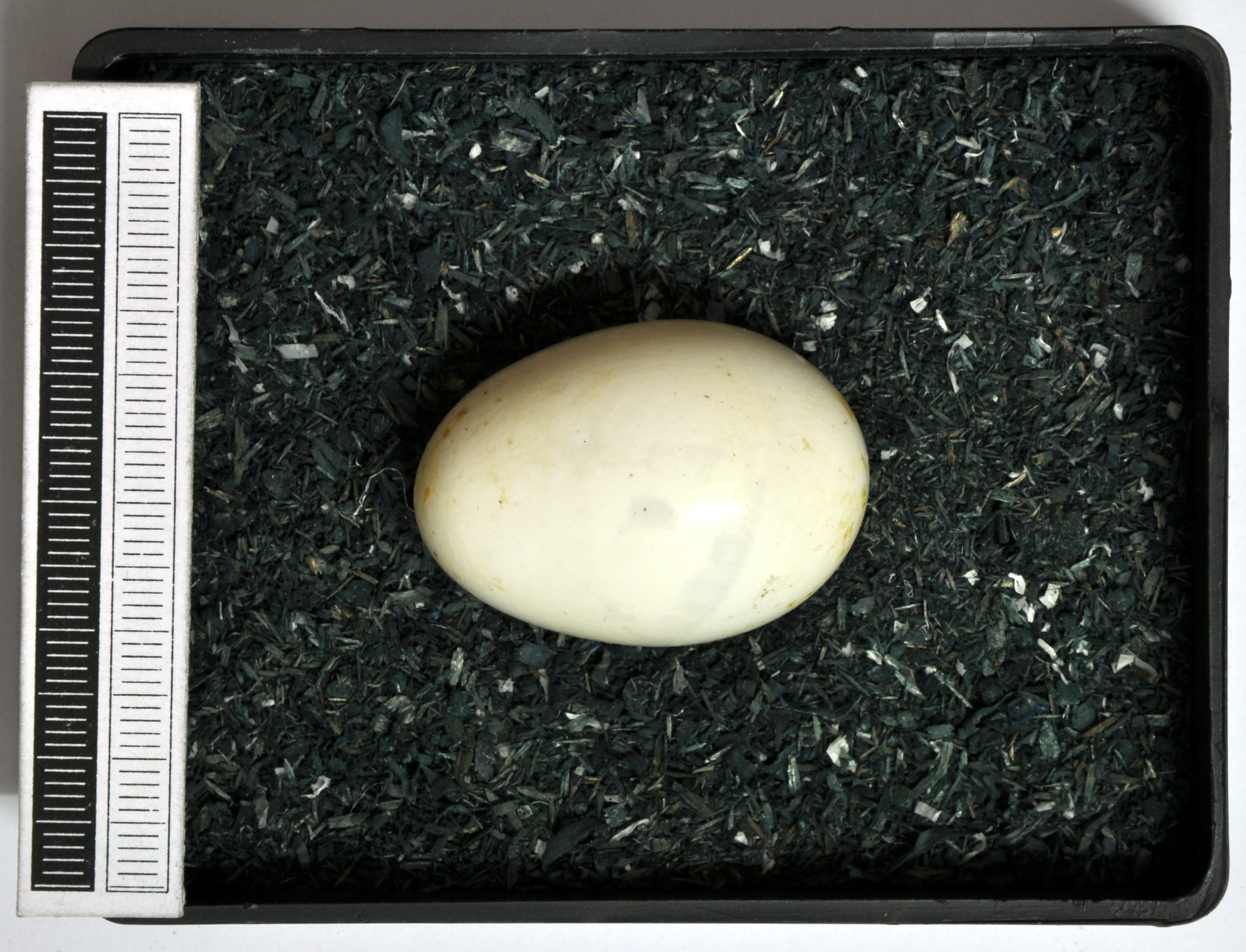
Egg, Collection Museum Wiesbaden

The woodpecker feeds by using its bill to hammer on dead trees to dig out carpenter ants and wood-boring beetle grubs. The selection of foods is relatively predictable, narrow and consistent in this species. Like all woodpeckers, this species has a specially adapted neck containing very strong muscles, which allow it to endlessly hack away at tree bark. Due to the size of its bill and large size and great physical power of this bird, it can access prey fairly deep within a tree. In order to position itself correctly, it has short, stumpy legs, as well as long, sharp claws and very stiff tail feathers. The woodpecker will more than likely choose for its nest a tree with a fungal disease, such as heart rot, although some will utilise a living, healthy tree. Once a hole has been made, the black woodpecker chips downwards through the trunk of the tree, creating a nesting chamber, the only lining being the woodchips created throughout the process. The black woodpecker's excavations provide homes for many other species of bird and mammal, and is therefore considered to be a "keystone" species in many of its habitats throughout its range. It not only provides habitats for other species, but also controls populations of wood-boring insects, helping to protect the trees.

When the nest is ready, the female lays a single clutch of two to eight eggs, the average being four to six. The nest hole is usually dug in a live poplar or pine tree. The breeding pair take it in turns to incubate the eggs, also sharing duties of feeding and brooding the chicks once they have hatched. The nestlings may fight their way to the entrance of the nest in order to be fed first. After 18 to 35 days, the young black woodpeckers will leave the nest, staying with the adults for another week.

== Status ==
The black woodpecker is a fairly widely distributed woodland species and can successfully breed in most areas where extensive woodland is left. At one point, when much of Europe and Asia was deforested, this species declined and in some areas is still struggling today, including in the Pyrenees. They normally require mature trees and ample stands of dead trees to sustain a viable breeding population. However, with the restoration of some forested areas, black woodpeckers have increased in some parts of Europe. They are occasionally considered a nuisance species due to their damage to power lines, communication poles and houses, occasionally resulting in woodpecker mortality due to electrocution or being culled by humans. The main cause of nesting failures appears to be predation. Their main natural predator is the pine marten (Martes martes), which feeds on eggs, nestlings and brooding females and then often takes over the nest hole of the woodpeckers for its own. Other than the marten, there are notably few known natural predators of black woodpeckers. Western jackdaws (Coloeus monedula) are notably regular usurpers of this species' nest holes and a potential predator of eggs and small nestlings. A few of the larger birds of prey that can hunt in woodlands may prey on black woodpeckers. Among those recorded are Ural owls (Strix uralensis), Eurasian eagle-owls (Bubo bubo), Eurasian goshawks (Astur gentilis), common buzzards (Buteo buteo) and golden eagles (Aquila chrysaetos).

== Cultural significance ==
The black woodpecker in the coat of arms of Pielisjärvi, Finland

The municipality of Nurmijärvi in Uusimaa, Finland, has adopted the black woodpecker as the title bird of the municipality, because in addition to being a relatively common bird in the locality, it also appears in the literature of Aleksis Kivi, a Finnish national author, originally from Nurmijärvi. Nurmijärvi's local football club NJS has also adopted the black woodpecker as the club's logo.

The black woodpecker is thought to be the woodpecker species referred to in the augural instructions on the early Italic Iguvine Tablets by the Umbrian word peiqu, a bird "very prominent in early Italic religion and mythology."

== See also ==
- Black-bodied woodpecker
- Pileated woodpecker

== Bibliography ==
- Gorman, Gerard (2004): Woodpeckers of Europe: A Study of the European Picidae. Bruce Coleman, UK. ISBN 1-872842-05-4.
- Gorman, Gerard (2011): The Black Woodpecker: A monograph on Dryocopus martius . Lynx Edicions, Barcelona. ISBN 978-84-96553-79-8.
