= Mackeson Stout =

Milk stout made in Hythe, Kent, England

- Company type: Milk stout
- Industry: Alcoholic beverage
- Founded: 1907
- Headquarters: Hythe, Kent, England
- Products: Beer
- Owner: Anheuser-Busch InBev

Mackeson Stout is a milk stout first brewed in 1907. It contains lactose, a sugar derived from milk.

== Milk stout ==
Milk stout (also called sweet stout, mellow stout or cream stout) is a stout containing lactose, a sugar derived from milk. Lactose cannot be fermented by brewers' yeast (Saccharomyces cerevisiae), and the residue adds sweetness, body and calories to the finished beer. Mackeson still bears on its label the milk churn that has been its trademark since it was first brewed in 1907.

Milk stout was believed to be nutritious, and was recommended to nursing mothers. In 1875, John Henry Johnson first sought a patent for a milk beer, based on whey, lactose and hops.

== History ==
Mackeson's Brewery of Hythe, Kent, first released the beer in 1909 to celebrate the 240th anniversary of brewing in Hythe. They patented it and licensed it to breweries across the country, so it quickly became a national brand and attracted numerous imitators. Whitbread acquired the brand in 1929. By the 1950s it accounted for half of Whitbread's production, and was brewed at Chiswell Street in London, Stockport, Kirkstall and Hythe.

Brewing at the Hythe plant ended in 1968. The beer was then brewed at the Exchange Brewery in Sheffield. When that was closed in 1993, Whitbread moved production to their Castle Eden and Samlesbury plants. From May 1999, then Vaux brewery until production was contracted out to Young's Brewery of Wandsworth. Whitbread was purchased in 2001 by Interbrew (now Anheuser-Busch InBev). Production was then moved to Camerons Brewery of Hartlepool, before moving to Hydes Brewery in Manchester until March 2012.

== Advertisements ==
A long-lasting television advertising campaign with the actor Bernard Miles contained the catch-phrase that Mackeson "looks good, tastes good and, by golly, it does you good."

After its claimed health benefits were challenged, the slogan was shortened to "It looks good, tastes good and by golly!"

For some years, Mackeson has been a 'ghost brand' in the UK; still produced and sold but without advertising or promotion.

== Versions ==
In 2012, its ABV was lowered from 3% to 2.8% in order to qualify for duty relief. It is available in 330 ml cans and 275 ml bottles.

A 4.9% Mackeson's XXX is brewed by Carib Brewery in Trinidad for the local market where it is targeted at young men, with the advertising slogan "king of the night". The Trinidadian version is a popular import into Hong Kong, and is among the top twenty highest-selling beers there, selling over 500,000 litres a year.

British-brewed Mackeson's XXX was imported by a division of Hudepohl-Schoenling of Cincinnati for the US market. This division became Royal Imports after a restructuring in the late 1990s and for a brief while in the early 2000s Royal had the "Triple Stout" contracted brewed in the US, first at the former Hudepohl brewery now owned by Boston Beer Company and then at The Lion in Wilkes-Barre, Pennsylvania.
