= Myoraksan =

Mountain in North Korea

- Hangul: 멸악산
- Hanja: 滅惡山
- RR: Myeoraksan
- MR: Myŏraksan

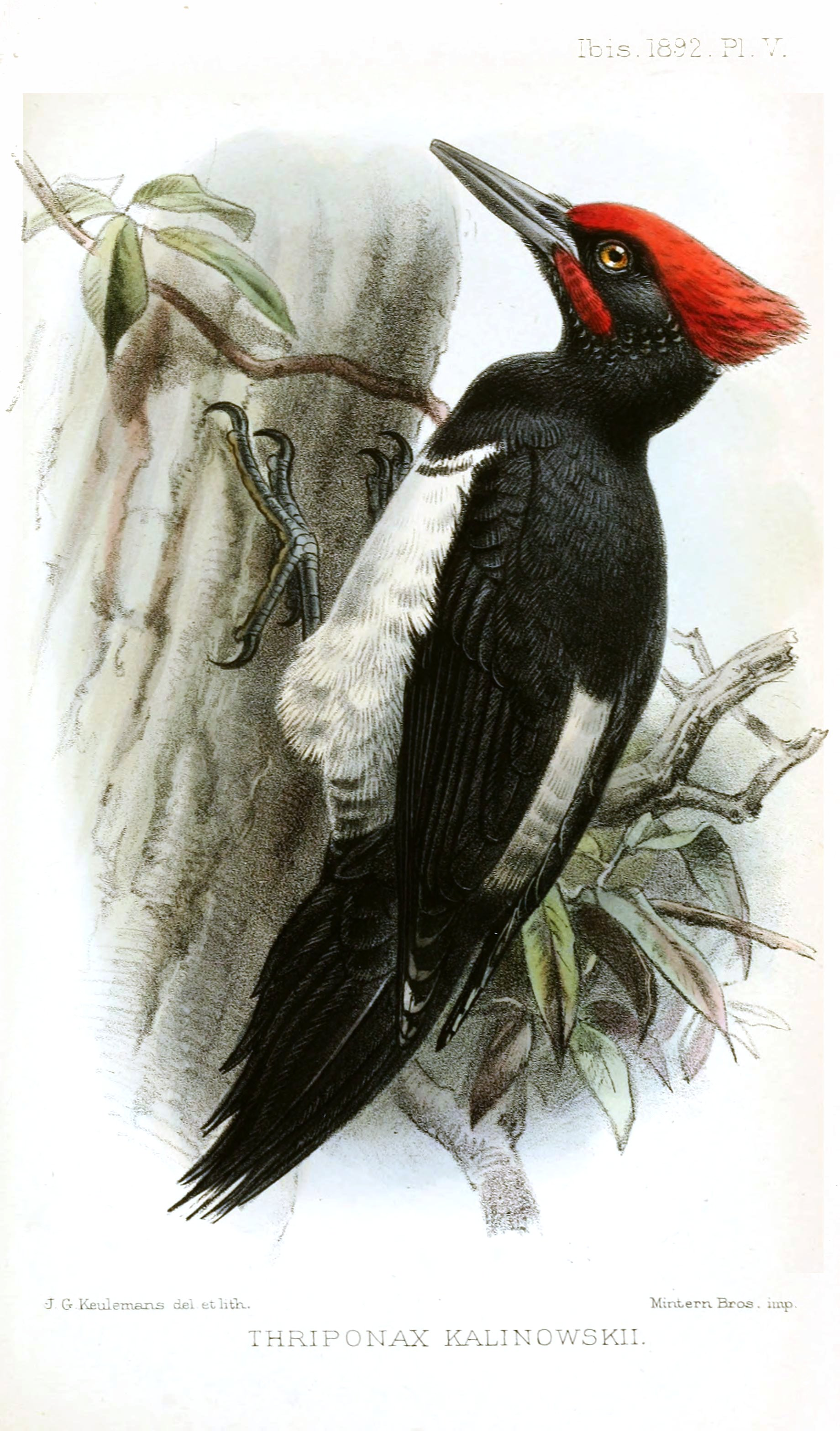
The forests at Myŏraksan are one of the last retreats for the Tristram's Woodpecker, a national treasure in North Korea.

Myoraksan

Highest point
- Elevation: 818 m (2,684 ft)
- Coordinates: 38°17′45″N 126°12′10″E

Geography
- Location: North Korea

Myŏraksan, in English Mt. Myorak, is a mountain on the border of Rinsan and P'yŏngsan counties of North Hwanghae Province in North Korea. It has an elevation of 818 m. A plant reserve of 126 km² was established in that area in 1976. It is one of the few suitable habitats for the Tristram's Woodpecker in the world.
