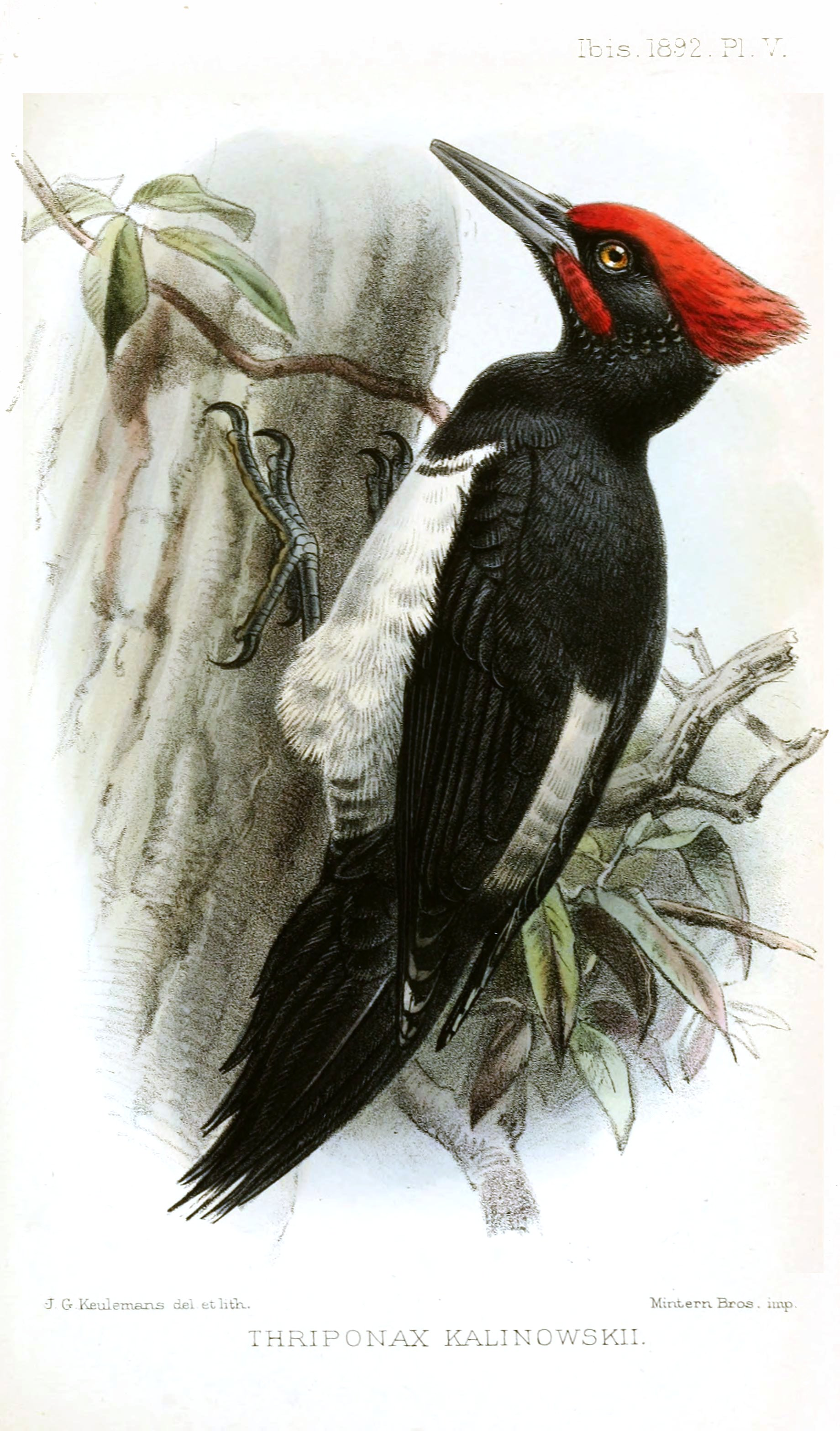
- CITES Appendix I (CITES)

Scientific classification
- Domain: Eukaryota
- Kingdom: Animalia
- Phylum: Chordata
- Class: Aves
- Order: Piciformes
- Family: Picidae
- Genus: Dryocopus
- Species: D. javensis
- Subspecies: D. j. richardsi

Trinomial name
- Dryocopus javensis richardsi (Tristram, 1879)

Synonyms
- Picus richardsi; Thriponax richardsi; Dryobates richardsi; Thriponax kalinowskii

= Tristram's woodpecker =

Subspecies of bird

Tristram's woodpecker (Dryocopus javensis richardsi) (Korean: 크낙새; RR: Khunak-sae, Japanese: キタタキ (Kitataki)) is a Korean subspecies of the white-bellied woodpecker. It was firstly identified and described by English scholar and ornithologist Henry Baker Tristram in 1879.

== Description ==
Tristram's woodpecker, with its 46 cm length, is among the largest of all woodpeckers. Both the tuft and the cheek patches are crimson red; its upper parts are black, which contrast with its white underparts, wing tips and a white rump. It has four toes, of which two are directed backwards. Its tail feathers are firm. Its native name was derived from its strange call, which sounds like "kullak!"

== Habitat and ecology ==
This woodpecker inhabits dense mountain forests above 1,000 m, as well as urban areas. It is commonly found in areas with chestnuts, oaks, poplars, and elms. It prefers dead trees, where it nests in the hollow trunk and searches the bark for insects. The breeding period is from April to May, where the female lays three to four eggs. It forages for food before sunrise and it returns its nest at sunset. It can move quickly from tree to tree, and when it perceives danger, it jumps into a hollow tree trunk.

== Threats ==
Historically, Tristram's woodpecker was found on the Japanese island of Tsushima and on the Korean peninsula. Due to intensive hunting and the request for museum specimens in the Western world between 1898 and 1902, this subspecies almost completely disappeared from that island. In 1920, Japanese ornithologist Dr. Nagamichi Kuroda found the last specimen on Tsushima. Also, in Korea it became a rare bird due to expansive deforestation. Though it was legally protected since 1952, it had vanished from South Korea by 1989. In 1993, a pair were spotted in the Demilitarized Zone. Today, it only exists in North Korea. Probably fewer than 50 birds exist in the provinces of Kangwŏn-do and North Hwanghae, in particular in the remaining forests of Rinsan, Phyongsan, Jangphung, Pakyon, and Kaesong around the area of Myŏraksan. On May 30, 1968, it was proclaimed as National Monument No. 197 and therefore it enjoyed the special protection of the government. It is listed in Appendix I CITES, but there is no special entry for this subspecies in the IUCN Red List.

In July 2017, South Korean authorities declared the extinction of Tristram's woodpecker in South Korea. Hence, only in the DPRK does Tristram's woodpecker still exist.
