= Galium ehrenbergii =

Scientific classification
- Kingdom: Plantae
- Clade: Tracheophytes
- Clade: Angiosperms
- Clade: Eudicots
- Clade: Asterids
- Order: Gentianales
- Family: Rubiaceae
- Genus: Galium
- Species: G. ehrenbergii

Binomial name
- Galium ehrenbergii Boiss.

Species of plant in the coffee family

Galium ehrenbergii is a species of flowering plant in the Rubiaceae family. It was first described by Pierre Edmond Boissier. In 1884, Henry Baker Tristram found G. ehrenbergii in Jisr el Hajar, Lebanon. It is also found in Syria.
