= Castle Eden Brewery =

British brewery

Castle Eden Brewery (J Nimmo & Son Ltd) was a brewery that operated in the village of Castle Eden in County Durham. It was best known for Castle Eden Ale, which continues to be produced at Seaham.

== History ==
=== Founding and 19th century ===
The business was established in 1826, when John Nimmo (c.1801–1867) began to brew at the Castle Eden Inn in Castle Eden, which had its own brewhouse. After the death of John Nimmo, the brewery was managed by his son, William John Nimmo (1828–1901).

Between 1871 and 1888, the value of the fixtures at the brewery rose from £138 to £1,765. Nimmo was innovative, building the second pneumatic maltings in England in 1878-9, and his was among the first breweries to adopt powered drays in 1892. In 1892, J. Nimmo & Son Ltd was registered as a limited liability company with 41 public houses.

=== Expansion ===
William John Nimmo died in 1901, and he was succeeded by his son, also called William John Nimmo (1870–1951).

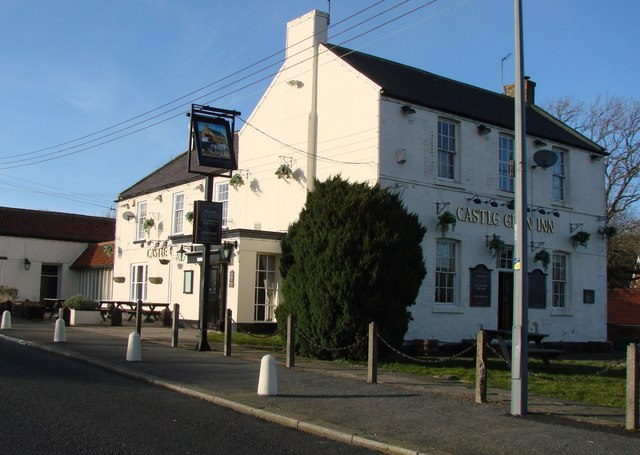
The Castle Eden Inn, Castle Eden

Alterations completed in 1910 made Castle Eden one of the most up-to-date breweries in the country and output doubled between 1906 and 1914. In 1912 the company acquired the brewing business of Thomas Chilton in Seaham, including 12 public houses. Between 1912 and 1920, production reached a record output of more than 42,000 barrels.

Nearly a third of the output was in bottles by 1942, and an automatic bottling plant came into operation in 1950.

William John Nimmo died in 1952 without any sons. His daughter, Eileen Denton Trechman (1905–2004), became chair of the company, and the only female to hold such a position in Britain.

Nimmo's red star logo was first installed as a neon sign at one of their houses in 1951. The company went public in 1952. In 1957 the company claimed to have opened the most modern malting plant in the North of England. In 1958, the company expanded into Tyneside with the acquisition of Davison & Wood, including 20 public houses.

=== Whitbread ownership ===
The national brewer Whitbread acquired J Nimmo & Son in September 1963, along with 125 public houses, for a cash and share exchange that valued the company at £2.25 million. Nimmo had not had sufficient capitalisation to expand and modernise its tied estate as an independent concern. Whitbread announced that it would retain the Nimmo name and expand production.

Whitbread rationalised the product portfolio in 1966, discontinuing all cask production in order to concentrate on keg beers such as Trophy Special. A £650,000 investment was announced in 1977, to enable all of the Whitbread group's beers to be racked and processed at the brewery.

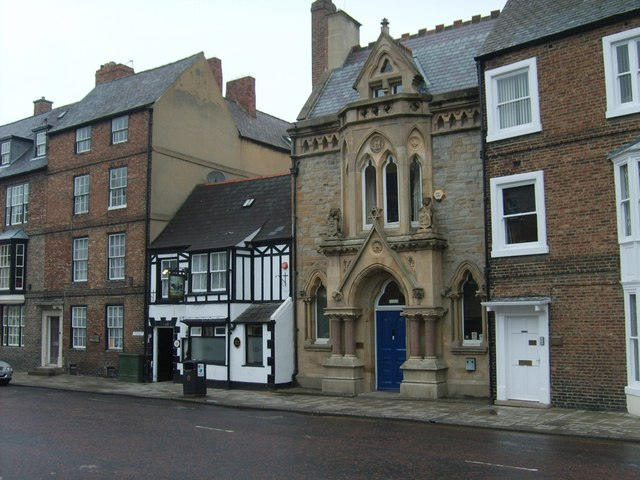
The Dun Cow Inn, Old Elvet, Durham, was a Castle Eden public house

Following the appointment of a new head brewer, Jim Kerr, cask beer production returned to the site from 1991. The brewery had an annual production capacity of 220,000 barrels by 1992. From 1992, Whitbread used the brewery to produce limited edition specialist ales.

A "Draughtflow" version of Castle Eden Ale had been introduced in cans by 1993. The same year the brewery began to brew Mackeson Stout, and Higsons Bitter and Mild following the closure of the Exchange Brewery in Sheffield. The brewery employed 150 people by 1995.

=== 21st century- initial closure and further changes in ownership ===
Whitbread announced plans to close down the brewery in 1998, but it was saved by an estimated £4 million management buyout by David Soley and David Beecroft. Production at the time was 60,000 barrels. Major negotiations took place over the ownership of the Trophy Special brand, which with production of 28,000 barrels, was essential if the new company was to survive on its own. Whitbread maintained ownership of the Castle Eden Ale and Best Scotch brands, which the new company could brew under licence for seven years.

The brewery was closed in 2002 and production was moved to Cameron's Brewery. Castle Eden continued to be produced until 2009, when InBev, which had inherited the Whitbread brand portfolio, refused renewal of the licence. Camerons announced the return of Castle Eden Ale production in 2013.

In 2014, the brewery assets were acquired by new owners and relocated to Seaham. to increase the production capacity of the brewery and to meet anticipated demand.

Since 2016, the brewery has focused on providing contract brewing and packaging whilst continuing to offer a range of Castle Eden Ales on draught.

Powder Monkey Group acquired the brewery and business in May 2025.

== Sources ==
- The Brewer's Tale: Memoirs of a Master Brewer, Frank Priestley (2010)
- Nick Redman, The History of the Castle Eden Brewery, County Durham (Whitbread plc, London, 1993).
