= Kirkby Stephen Grammar School =

Location
- Christian Head; Kirkby Stephen; Cumbria, CA17 4HA; England; 54.47425°N 2.35414°W

Information
- Type: Comprehensive; Academy
- Mottoes: Dio volendo io lo faro (Translation: God willing I will do it); Together we will achieve our potential
- Established: 1566; 460 years ago
- Founder: Baron Thomas Wharton
- Local authority: Westmorland and Furness
- Department for Education URN: 137107 Tables
- Ofsted: Reports
- Headteacher: Nic Tweddle
- Gender: Coeducational
- Age: 11 to 18
- Enrolment: 347
- Capacity: 545
- Website: http://www.ksgs.cumbria.sch.uk/

Kirkby Stephen Grammar School is a coeducational comprehensive secondary school. It is an academy and has a sixth form. It is located in Kirkby Stephen in the English county of Cumbria.

The school was founded in 1566 by Thomas Wharton, 1st Baron Wharton, under letters patent granted by Queen Elizabeth I. Although it has retained the grammar school in its name, Kirkby Stephen became a comprehensive school in 1959 and converted to academy status in 2011.

Kirkby Stephen Grammar School offers GCSEs and BTECs as programmes of study for pupils, while students in the sixth form have the option to study from a range of A-levels and vocational courses.

== Notable former pupils ==
- John William Cameron, brewer

== See also ==
- List of English and Welsh endowed schools (19th century)
