= The Castle, Castle Eden =

Historic building in England

Coordinates: 54.7423°N 1.3373°W

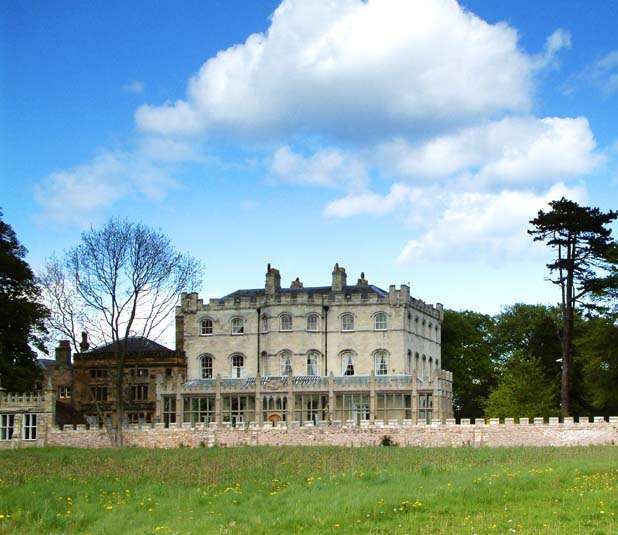
The Castle at Castle Eden: photograph by Les Hull

The Castle at Castle Eden, County Durham, England, is an 18th-century, Palladian style, mansion house and a Grade II* listed building. No trace remains of the medieval castle of Robert the Bruce.

The historic listing states that "by 1678, Sir William Bromley owned the manor" and that in 1758, "William Throckmorton Bromley, sold the property to Rowland Burdon". At that time, "the estate was in poor condition and unenclosed, the chapel was in ruins and the mansion house had gone". Burdon enclosed the land, erected a church and built the manor house.

The Burdon family of Castle Eden had their origins in Stockton on Tees, where the first Rowland Burdon was mayor nine times in the 17th century. His great-grandson Rowland Burdon III, a merchant banker, purchased the manor of Castle Eden in 1758, and in about 1765, with the assistance of architect William Newton, built the house which came to be known as The Castle. The house has three storeys and a seven-bay entrance front, and encompasses 15,102 square feet (1,403.0 m^{2}). The central three bays are canted and the whole carries a castellated parapet.

His grandson, Rowland Burdon V, was Member of Parliament for County Durham from 1790 to 1806, and his son Rowland VI was resident in 1861 and recorded in the census of that year as a farmer of 352 acres (1.42 km^{2}). In 1881 the census records the resident as Rev John Burdon, a widower with two children and ten servants.

In about 1863 the entrance frontage was enhanced by the addition of a single-storey six-bayed palmhouse, and in 1893 a north wing was added.

Later Rowland Burdens served as High Sheriff of Durham in 1872 and 1907.

The property was for sale in late 2020, with 14 acres of land; the castle then included 11 bedrooms and 15,102 square feet of space. Extensive restoration had been completed over the previous two decades. An article about the castle stated that "the dungeon is accessed via stone steps from the ground floor and includes many different rooms that span the entire footprint of the Castle".
