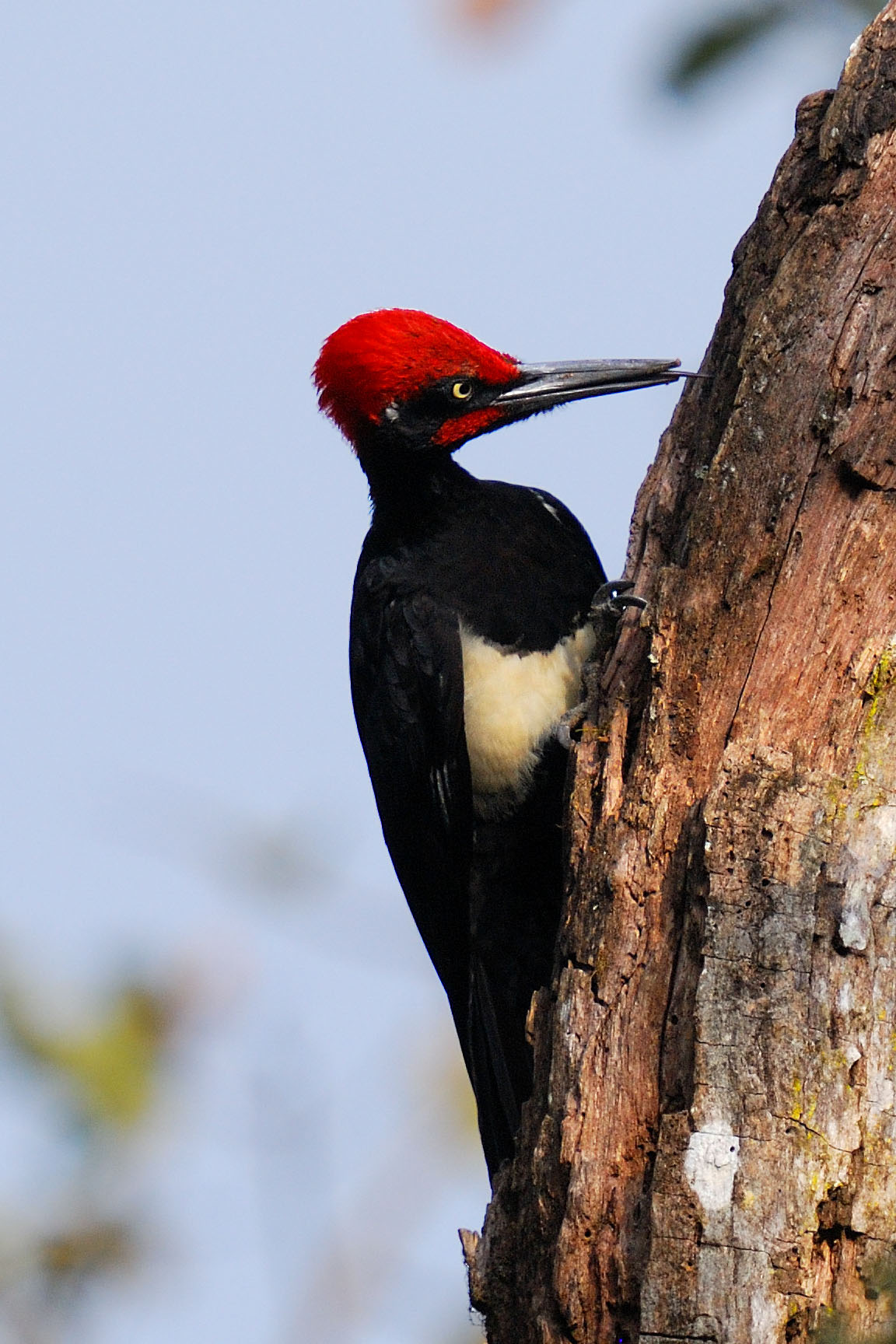
- D. j. hodgsonii

Conservation status
- Least Concern (IUCN 3.1)

Scientific classification
- Kingdom: Animalia
- Phylum: Chordata
- Class: Aves
- Order: Piciformes
- Family: Picidae
- Genus: Dryocopus
- Species: D. javensis

Binomial name
- Dryocopus javensis (Horsfield, 1821)

Subspecies
- See text

= White-bellied woodpecker =

Species of bird

The white-bellied woodpecker or great black woodpecker (Dryocopus javensis) is a woodpecker species inhabiting evergreen forests in tropical Indian subcontinent and Southeast Asia. It is among the largest of the Asiatic woodpeckers and nests in large dead trees, often beside rivers. It has 14 subspecies, and many of its island forms are endangered, some are extinct. Populations differ in the distribution and extent of white. Its drums and calls are louder than those of the smaller woodpeckers.

== Description ==
Cotigao NP, Goa, India Nov 1997

This species is one of the largest living species of woodpecker. Adults range in size from 40 to 48 cm (16 to 19 in) and are behind only to the great slaty woodpecker and black woodpecker in size among Asian woodpecker species. The species is considered closely related to the more northern black woodpecker and the North American pileated woodpecker and is similar in size to these species. Body mass can vary from 197 to 350 g (6.9 to 12.3 oz). Among standard measurements, the wing chord is 20.5 to 25.2 cm (8.1 to 9.9 in), the tail is 14.3 to 18.9 cm (5.6 to 7.4 in), the bill is 4.6 to 6 cm (1.8 to 2.4 in) and the tarsus is 3.2 to 4.3 cm (1.3 to 1.7 in).

The subspecies hodgsonii has whitish underwing coverts and a white rump. The face lacks white, but juveniles of the nominate race can have white streaks on the throat. Differences from the other Southeast Asian subspecies in the vocalizations and morphology of this species are suggested to be large enough to raise this to full species status. Solitary adults may spend an hour foraging at a suitable tree. The subspecies hodgsonii of India breeds from January to May, mainly in large dead trees, often using the same tree year after year. The normal clutch is usually of two eggs. They feed mainly on insects such as ants or grubs obtained mainly from under bark, but sometimes take fruit. Although shy, they can nest close to well-used tracks and human disturbed areas. They have a range of calls from a short, sharp kuk to more intoned kyuk, kew, kee-yow calls. The longer calls are given prior to flying off. They roost within holes.

== Subspecies ==
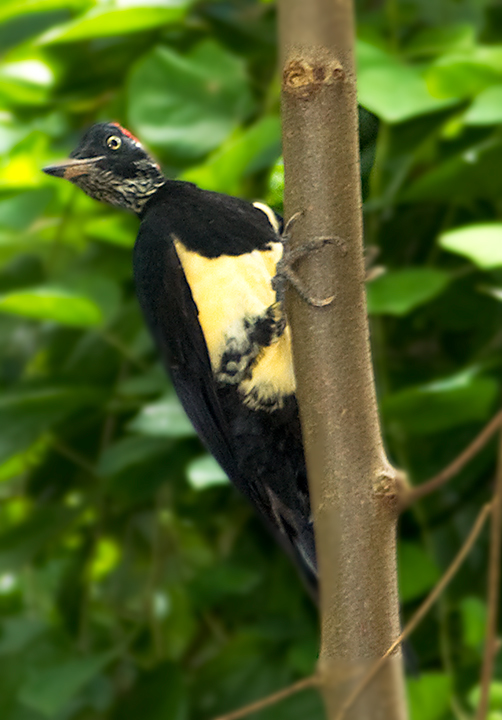
Male, the Philippines

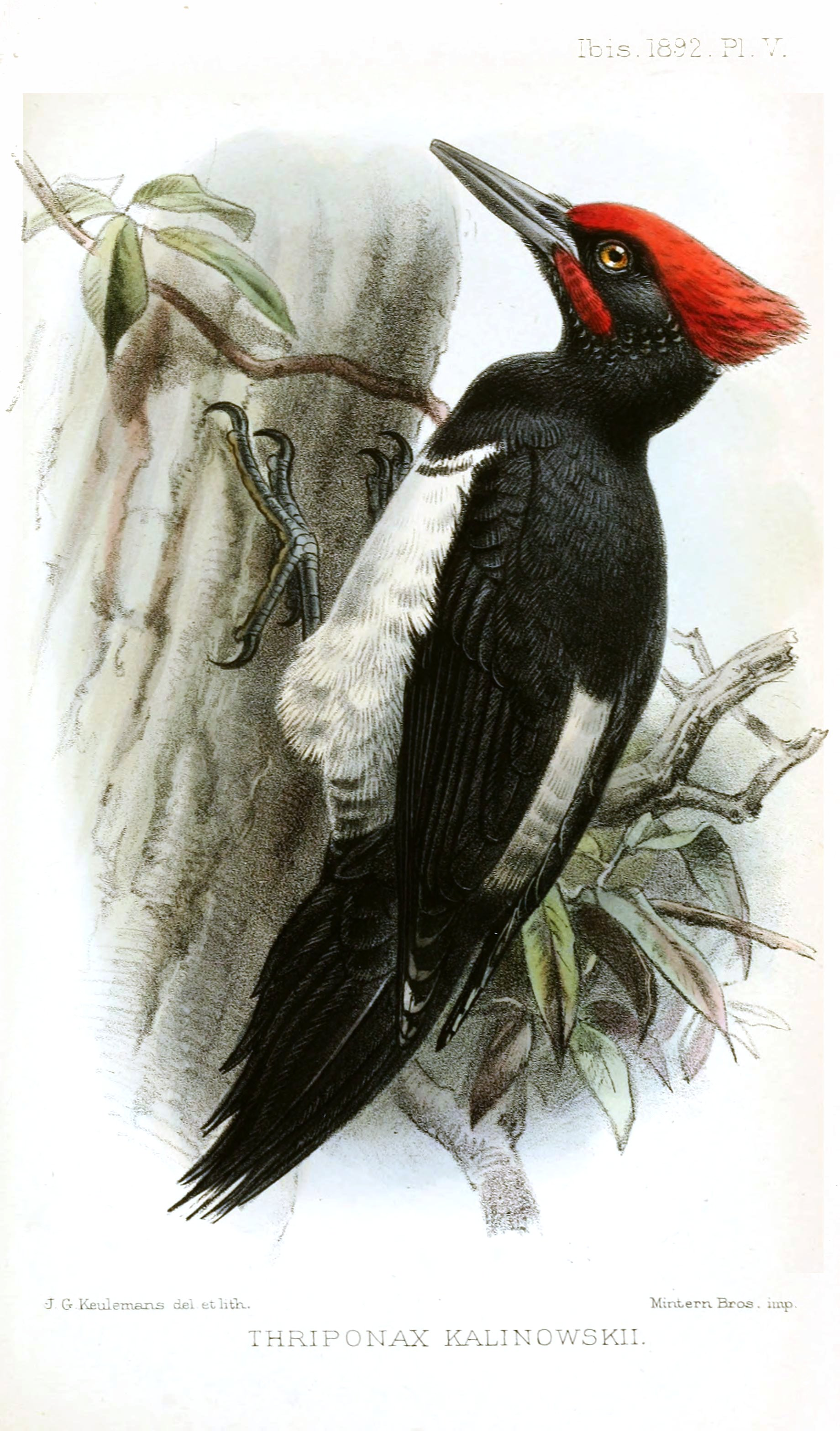
Tristram's woodpecker (D. j. richardsi)

Fourteen subspecies have been described:

- D. j. javensis (Horsfield, 1821) (southern Thailand to Borneo)
- D. j. philippinensis (Steere, 1890) (the Philippines; more often subsumed into the nominate subspecies)
- D. j. cebuensis Kennedy, 1987 (Cebu Island); not seen since the 1950s and likely extinct
- D. j. confusus (Stresemann, 1913) (Luzon; includes esthloterus (Parkes, 1971))
- D. j. feddeni (Blyth, 1863) (Thailand, Laos and Burma)
- D. j. forresti Rothschild, 1922 (northern Myanmar and Yunnan)
- D. j. hargitti (Sharpe, 1884) (Palawan)
- D. j. hodgsonii (Jerdon, 1840) (mainly the Western Ghats of India, but also known from central India and the Eastern Ghats)
- D. j. mindorensis (Steere, 1890) (Mindoro)
- D. j. multilunatus (McGregor, 1907) (Basilan, Dinagat, Mindanao)
- D. j. parvus (Richmond, 1902) (Simeulue Island)
- D. j. pectoralis (Tweeddale, 1878) (Samar, Bohol and other islands)
- D. j. richardsi (Tristram, 1879) (Tristram's woodpecker; found only in North Korea, extinct in South Korea and Tsushima, Japan)
- D. j. suluensis (W. Blasius, 1890) (Sulu)

The Andaman woodpecker (Dryocopus hodgei) was treated as a subspecies in the past. The species has in the past been placed in the genus Thriponax and Macropicus.

== Behaviour and ecology ==
This large black woodpecker is usually seen singly or as a pair, which may sometimes be accompanied by a third bird. They have a dipping in which the loud single note, a laugh-like chiank call, is produced. They also produce loud drumming, especially in the breeding season. The breeding season is mainly January to March. The nest is built in a large dead tree, often in open forest. Two white eggs are the usual clutch. In Bastar in central India, the squabs are sought after by tribals, resulting in the rarity of these birds there.
