= Leeds Brewery =

Brewery in Leeds, England

- logo
- Industry: Alcoholic beverage
- Founded: 2007
- Founder: Michael Brothwell & Sam Moss
- Headquarters: Leeds, England
- Products: Beer
- Production output: 150,000 imperial pints (85,000 L) per week
- Owner: Michael Brothwell & Sam Moss
- Number of employees: 13

The Leeds Brewery is an independent brewery established in June 2007 in Leeds, UK by former local radio presenter Michael Brothwell. The company uses a 20 barrel brewing plant located in a trading estate on the outskirts of the city; it is capable of delivering 150,000 imperial pints (85,000 L) of beer a week, and produces five regular brands, including their flagship Leeds Pale Ale at 3.8%, a 4.3% best bitter Leeds Best and the award winning mild ale Midnight Bell. The company also produces a series of monthly specials. The company had seven pubs in Leeds, with a microbrewery upstairs at The Brewery Tap and two pubs in York but these were sold to Camerons Brewery in 2016. In January 2023, Leeds Brewery ceased trading and the Leeds Brewery brand was sold to Kirkstall Brewery.

== History ==
Leeds Brewery was established in June 2007 by university friends Michael Brothwell (a former BBC Radio York presenter) and Sam Moss and has since been producing a range of permanent and seasonal cask ales.

In 2008 the Leeds brewery asked Leeds United supporters to help name a new beer in an online poll. The favourite was to name the beer Radebeer after Leeds United player Lucas Radebe. The beer was available in local pubs, with 10p from every pint sold going towards the Leeds United transfer fund.

== Brewery ==
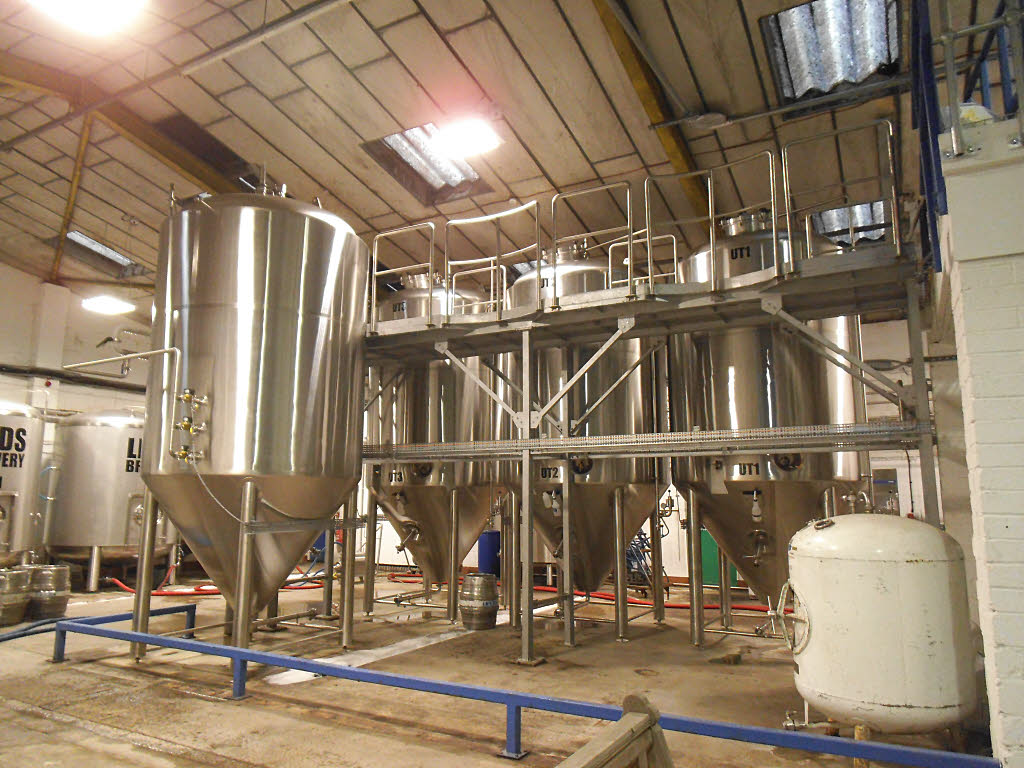
Fermentation tanks at the brewery

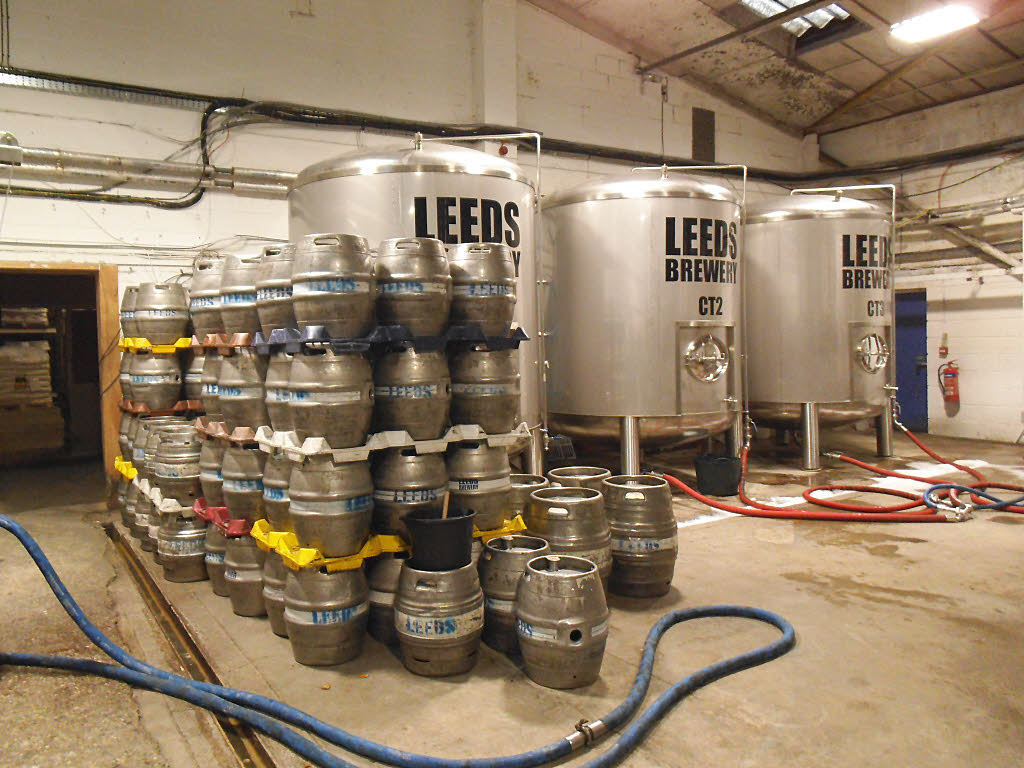
Conditioning tanks at the brewery

The brewery is located on a trading estate in Beeston, on the outskirts of the city. The brewery uses a 20 barrel brewing plant, capable of delivering 150,000 imperial pints (85,000 L) of beer a week; and produces four regular all year brands along with a pilsner style lager and seasonals throughout the year. The regular beers are Leeds Pale, a 3.8% session bitter, Leeds Best, a 4.3% best bitter, Yorkshire Gold, a hoppy golden ale at 4% and Midnight Bell, a 4.8% mild ale which was awarded "Best New Brewery Beer" at the 2007 Peterborough Beer Festival. Midnight Bell recently won Gold at the SIBA beer awards for dark cask beers. The lager, Leodis at 4.6% is named after the Roman name for Leeds The seasonals include Gathering Storm, a 4.4% stout, in October, New Moon, a 4.3% black IPA, in February, and Samba, a 3.7% golden ale, in June.

== Pubs ==
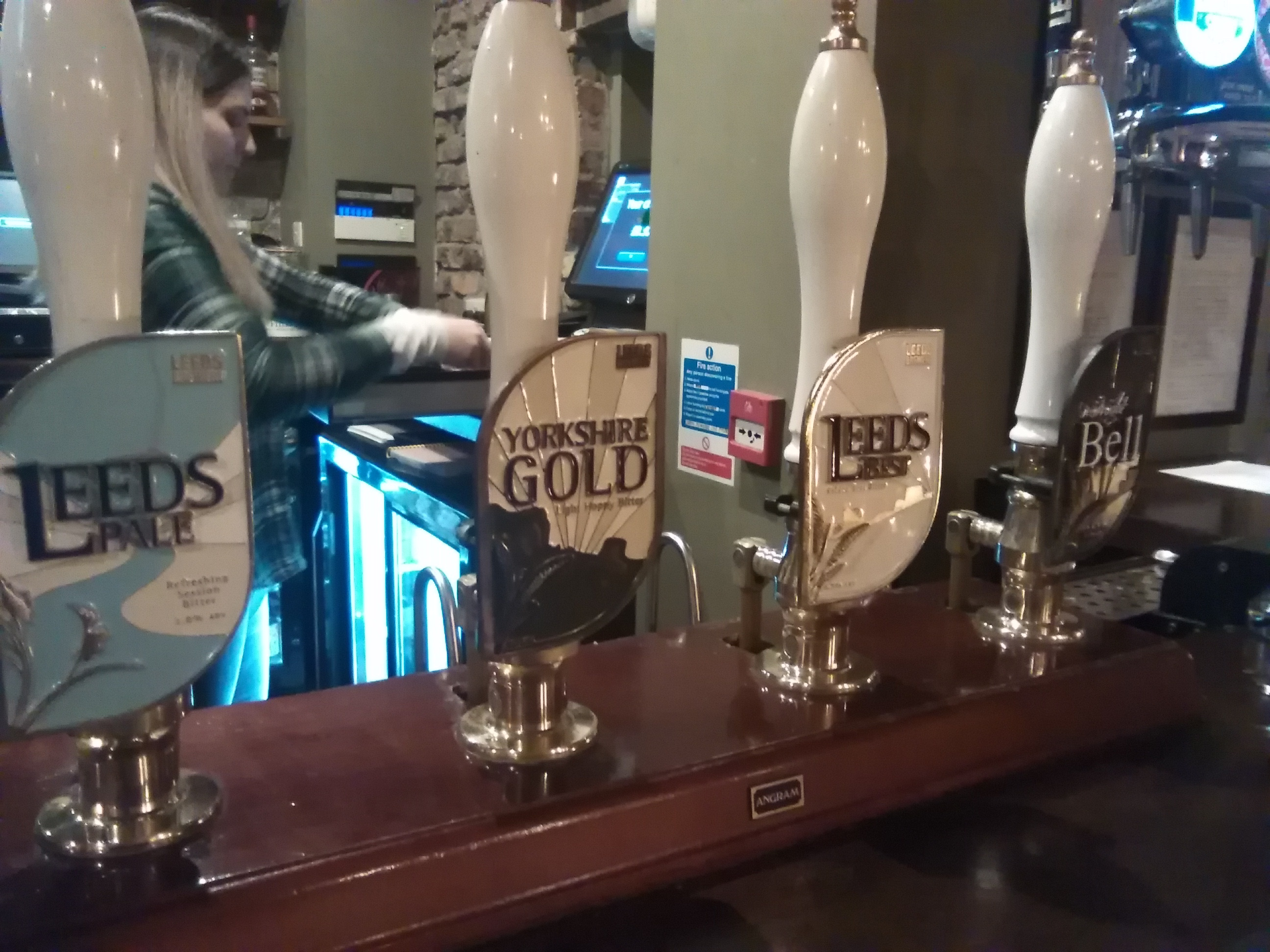
Leeds Brewery pumps in the Lamb and Flag, Leeds

The company had seven pubs, in Leeds. The Midnight Bell, The White Swan, The Crowd of Favours, The Lamb & Flag, The Garden Gate, PIN Bar and The Brewery Tap. The Brewery Tap had a microbrewery upstairs for brewing lager. The company also opened its first pubs outside Leeds in 2013, the Duke of York and The Eagle and Child, both in York city centre. In July 2016, the estate of seven pubs (excluding PIN which closed and The Garden Gate) was sold to Camerons Brewery.
