= Castle Eden =

Village in County Durham, England

Coordinates: 54.7361°N 1.3509°W

- Location within County Durham
- Population: 642 (2011)
- Civil parish: Castle Eden
- Unitary authority: County Durham
- Ceremonial county: Durham
- Region: North East
- Country: England
- Sovereign state: United Kingdom
- Post town: HARTLEPOOL
- Postcode district: TS27
- Dialling code: 01429
- Police: Durham
- Fire: County Durham and Darlington
- Ambulance: North East
- UK Parliament: Easington

Castle Eden is a village in County Durham, England, south of Peterlee, Wingate, Hutton Henry, the A19 and Castle Eden Dene. The former Castle Eden Brewery was home to Castle Eden Ale.

== Etymology ==
Castle Eden takes its name from the Eden Burn that runs through it. Eden is a fairly common outcome in English of a Brittonic river name that can be reconstructed as *ituna ('to gush forth'). Mawer suggested that the name for the burn derives from that of the settlement, which he suggested may come from Gaelic aodann ("forehead, hill-brow"). The name is first attested around 1050 as Geodene and Iodene, both representing the pronunciation ['jo:dene].

== History ==
The Parish Council Web site states that "Castle Eden has its origins in the 10th century when King Reinwald led a campaign of Danish raids and land acquisition". Ownership passed among various Danes until it was eventually taken by Bishop Cutheard and given to Ealfrith; just prior to the Norman Conquest the estate was owned by Tilred.

In the 1100s, Castle Eden became the seat of Robert de Brus, 2nd Lord of Annandale who may have had a castle near the settlement.

In the 1760s, a farm labourer digging out a hedge discovered a fine glass beaker, known as "The Castle Eden Beaker". It now resides in the British Museum.

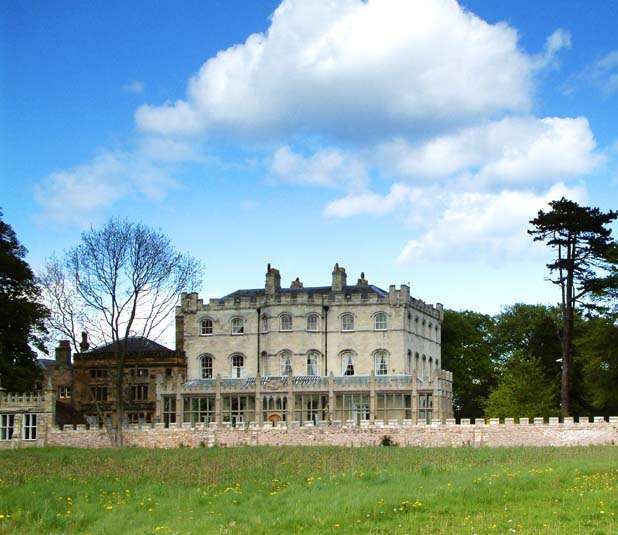
"The Castle", an 18th-century mansion

The historic listing states that "by 1678, Sir William Bromley owned the manor" and that in 1758, "William Throckmorton Bromley, sold the property to Rowland Burdon". At that time, "the estate was in poor condition and unenclosed, the chapel was in ruins and the mansion house had gone". Burdon enclosed the land, erected a church and built the manor house or "The Castle" as it became named.

Rowland Burdon returned to the estate in 1766 to work on, adding the present Regency Gothic wing. Sir John Soane, renowned Regency architect, visited the completed castle on his way from another project. He drafted plans, proposing a potential Neoclassical remodelling of the structure. Burdon in the end chose not to commission him.

The Nimmo family would go on in 1826 to found what would come to be known as the Castle Eden Brewery, trading as J. Nimmo and Son Limited. Other families such as the Savilles owned their rope works and bleachery for sail cloth manufacturing, making the village, at the start of the 19th century, a fairly industrious one.

In the course of the 19th century, the village became much expanded but still lowly populated and spread out. It was served by the Castle Eden Railway and railway station, a police station and a magistrates' court. These were all closed in the 1960s, and their buildings demolished. The village also had its own primary school, but it was closed in the 1970s.

=== 20th and 21st century ===
Until the 1980s, the village still had a post office, which subsequently closed, leaving the Castle Eden Inn, the cricket club, the golf club and the village hall as the only amenities. In 1998, the national brewer Whitbreads, which had purchased the brewery from the Nimmo family in the 1960s, announced its closure. For a short while, brewing continued there but the site was finally sold and, in 2003, redeveloped as houses. The only evidence that the brewery existed is the fine roadside Victorian façade, which was retained. Since 2015, Castle Eden branded beers have been brewed by an independent microbrewery in Seaham.

The Grade II listed St James Church was built circa 1764 and was modified circa 1800 and 1896. There was a great deal of uncertainty in 2015 about the future of the church due to "dwindling members, soaring running costs and retiring volunteers". As of February 2021, however, the Parish Council Web site stated that the church "is open for Sunday services" and is "part of a United benefice with Blackhall and Hesleden St. Andrew".

As of early February 2021, the undated Parish web site states that "in recent times the village has expanded with the building of new houses on the site of Nimmos brewery ... whilst Castle Eden Dene has regained its reputation as one of the most spectacular places to visit in County Durham and is a National Nature Reserve". The castle building and its 14 acres of land were for sale in 2020. At that time, the castle included 11 bedrooms and 15,102 square feet of space. Extensive restoration had been completed over the previous two decades. The Castle Eden Golf Club is located near the castle building.

== Notable people ==
- Ben Stokes, Durham and England Cricketer lives in Castle Eden.
- Katherine Tristram, missionary to Japan, was born here in 1858.
