= John William Cameron =

English brewer

John William Cameron (2 October 1841 – 28 December 1896) was an English brewer who owned Camerons Brewery of Hartlepool, County Durham.

== Life ==
Cameron was born in Kirkby Stephen, Westmorland, on 2 October 1841, the son of a farmer, Ewen Cameron, and Hannah Cameron. He was of Scottish Highlands ancestry. He attended Kirkby Stephen Grammar School. He served a six-year brewing apprenticeship at the Bank Brewery in Barnard Castle.

In 1865 he joined the Lion Brewery in West Hartlepool as manager. Upon the death of the owner, William Waldon Jr, in 1872, Cameron secured a 21-year lease on the brewery and 16 public houses. In 1881 he married Emma Victoria, the daughter of Edgar Chapman of Adelaide at Tunbridge Wells. When Cameron's lease expired in 1893, he purchased the brewery outright from the Waldon family for £34,442 (£3.8 million in 2012), and he appointed his brother Watson as managing director.

Cameron served as the chief magistrate of Hartlepool from 1889 to 1890. He died on 28 December 1896 and was buried in Marske, near Richmond, Yorkshire. His personal estate was valued at £336,265. In 1905 the Cameron Hospital was opened in Hartlepool, built by the Cameron family in his memory.
