= Katharine Tristram =

British missionary and teacher in Japan

Katherine Tristram
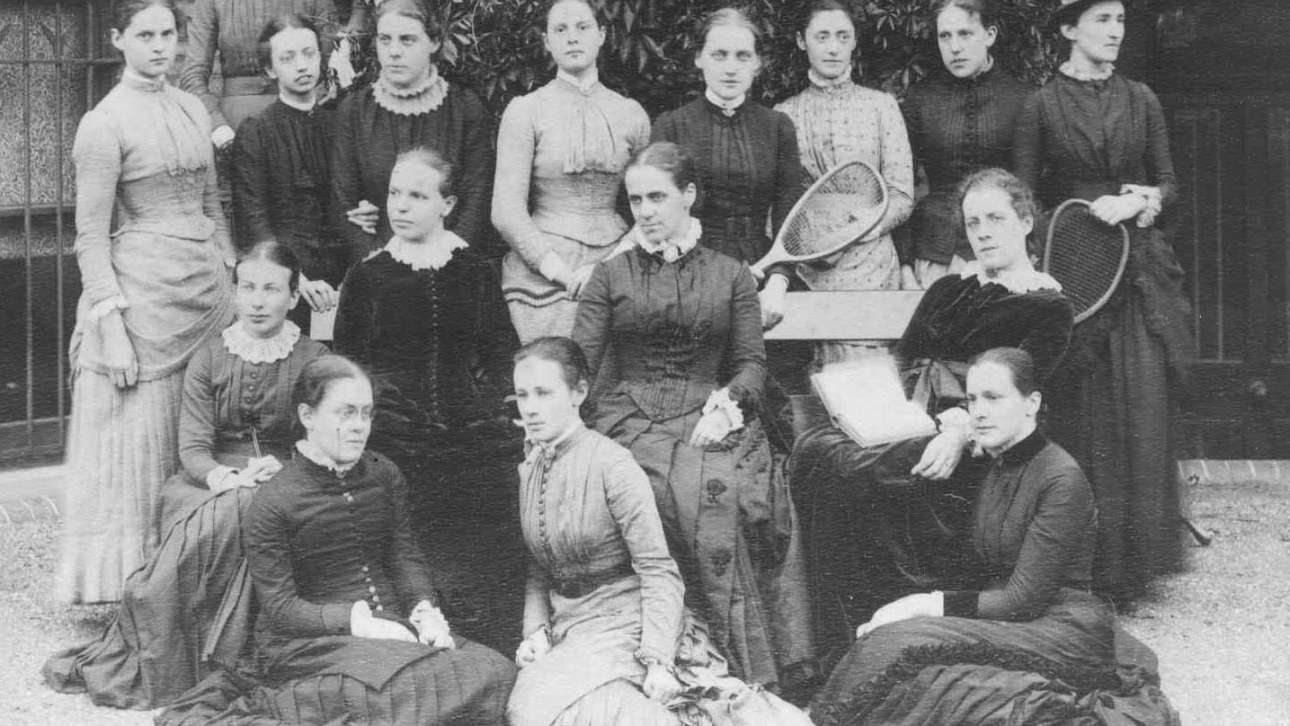
- in the front row
- Born: 29 April 1858; Castle Eden
- Died: 24 August 1948 (aged 90); Bristol
- Education: London University
- Occupation: headteacher
- Employer: Church Missionary Society
- Known for: Head of Bishop Poole's Memorial Girls School in Osaka

Katharine Alice Salvin Tristram (29 April 1858 – 24 August 1948) was a missionary and teacher in Japan with the Church Missionary Society. She was also the first resident lecturer at Westfield College and one of the first women to gain a degree from the University of London. She was the first woman missionary with the Church Missionary Society to have a degree.

== Family and education ==
Katharine Tristram was born on 29 April 1858 in Castle Eden, co. Durham, the fifth child of the Revd. Henry Baker Tristram (1822–1906), canon of Durham, and his wife, Eleanor Mary (d. 1903), daughter of Captain P. Bowlby.

She was educated at Cheltenham Ladies' College before teaching mathematics as the first resident lecturer at Westfield College, London. She sent on to the University of London where she graduated in 1887.

Her sister was also active in the missionary cause, as a fundraiser and a writer for the Church Missionary Intelligencer.

== Career ==
In 1882 Katharine Tristram was appointed as the first resident lecturer at Westfield College, under its first principal, Constance Maynard.

She was accepted as a missionary of the Church Missionary Society (CMS). She was the first woman missionary with the Church Missionary Society to have a degree. She was assigned to the Japan Mission and she became the head teacher of the CMS's school for girls in Osaka. The school would later to be called the Bishop Poole's Memorial Girls School after ex-missionary Arthur William Poole who was, briefly, the first Bishop in Japan from 1883. He died in 1885.

In 1888 Tristram left Westfield to go out to Japan as a CMS missionary. She joined the staff of the Eisei Girls’ School, which had been taken over by the Church Missionary Society. After passing an examination in Japanese she became headmistress of the school in January 1890. In March 1890 the school became the Bishop Poole Memorial Girls’ School, named after Arthur William Poole, the first English bishop in Japan. Her mission was to convert the students in her care and she was ambitious that the students would become missionaries themselves. She also oversaw an improvement in the academic standards of the school.

In 1891 Japan was hit by an earthquake. Tristram and other missionaries visited the disaster zone to provide aid to the injured and dying.

Her father was very involved with work for the CMS and he made a special trip to visit her in Japan in 1891, although while he was there he continued his study of ornithology and Katherine helped with his collecting by acting as his translator. In 1891 her father visited her, but apart from this she saw friends and family only on occasional home furloughs. She sometimes took advantages of these furloughs to enjoy walking holidays with her old College friend, Alice Hodgekin.

Tristram remained in Japan until 1938.

Tristram maintained a relationship with Westfield College, writing back to Constance Maynard often. She also wrote articles for the College newsletter about missionary life and Japanese customs, and arranged a scheme in which Westfield students sponsored a Japanese student as the ‘Westfield Scholar’.

== Later life ==
Tristram retired from Bishop Poole School in 1927 but remained in Tokyo until 1938, when life became more difficult for British and American missionaries in Japan - in part because of the outbreak of war with China in 1937. When she retired she went to Tokyo where she worked in a sanatorium that looked after patients with tuberculosis.

She died at Brislington House, Bristol, on 24 August 1948. Her papers and letters are held in Birmingham. The letters to and journals of her friend Alice Hodgkins are also in that collection.
