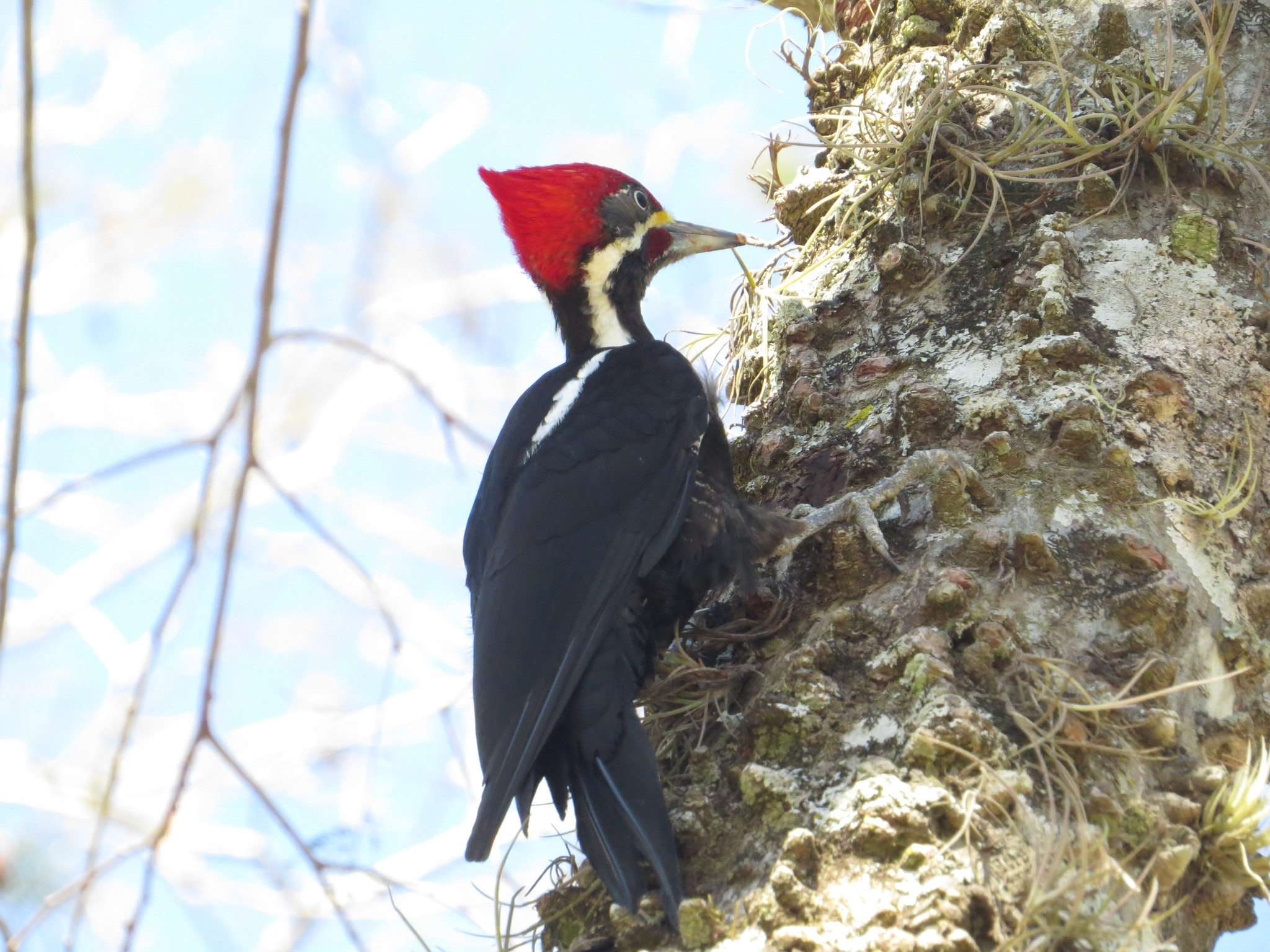

Conservation status
- Near Threatened (IUCN 3.1)

Scientific classification
- Kingdom: Animalia
- Phylum: Chordata
- Class: Aves
- Order: Piciformes
- Family: Picidae
- Genus: Dryocopus
- Species: D. schulzii

Binomial name
- Dryocopus schulzii (Cabanis, 1882)

Synonyms
- Hylatomus schulzii; Dryocopus schulzi

= Black-bodied woodpecker =

Species of bird

The black-bodied woodpecker (Dryocopus schulzii) is a Near Threatened species of bird in subfamily Picinae of the woodpecker family Picidae. It is found in Argentina, Bolivia, and Paraguay.

== Taxonomy and systematics ==
The black-bodied woodpecker's taxonomy is unsettled. The South American Classification Committee (SACC) of the American Ornithological Society, the International Ornithological Committee, and the Clements taxonomy place it in genus Dryocopus. BirdLife International's Handbook of the Birds of the World (HBW) places it in genus Hylatomus. Further, the SACC spells the specific epithet schulzi, rejecting the change from it to schulzii that the other three systems adopted.

All four systems agree that the black-bodied woodpecker is monotypic.

== Description ==
The black-bodied woodpecker is 29 to 30 cm (11 to 12 in) long. Both sexes have a long pointed crest. Adult males have a red forehead and crest. They have gray ear coverts, a very thin and short white stripe behind the eye, a white stripe from the lores to under the ear coverts and continuing down the side of the neck, a red malar stripe with a bit of black at its back end, and a white chin. Adult females have a black malar stripe and a blackish lower forehead but are otherwise the same as males. Adults of both sexes have a black throat and hindneck and are mostly black below the neck. The southern population has black scapulars; those of the northern population have white on the scapulars' outer webs that continues the white neck line. Their flight feathers are black with white bases. The upper side of their tail is black with white feather shafts; the underside is black to brownish black. Their flanks and lower belly often have some faint yellowish barring. Their bill is a long pale ivory-white chisel with a darker culmen and base, their iris deep brown to red-brown, and their legs dark gray. Juveniles are duller and browner than adults and with more barring on the flank.

== Distribution and habitat ==
The black-bodied woodpecker is found from the southern Bolivia departments of Santa Cruz and Tarija south through western and central Paraguay into north-central Argentina as far as Córdoba and San Luis provinces. It inhabits the woodland and savanna of the dry Gran Chaco and the transition zones between them and moister montane forest. In elevation it ranges as high as 1,000 m (3,300 ft).

== Behavior ==
=== Movement ===
The black-bodied woodpecker is a year-round resident throughout its range.

=== Feeding ===
The black-bodied woodpecker usually forages singly or in pairs, but also occasionally in small family groups. It pecks, hammers, and probes trunks and main limbs. Its diet has not been described.

=== Breeding ===
The black-bodied woodpecker's breeding season spans at least October to December and might extend to March. It excavates a nest hole in a dead tree or utility pole. The clutch size, incubation period, time to fledging, and details of parental care are not known.

=== Vocal and non-vocal sounds ===
The black-bodied woodpecker's most common call is "a loud "wic wic wic wic wic"". It also makes a "harsh rattle, "ti-chrr"", and when disturbed near its nest a repeated "descending "kirrrrrr"". It drums in a long roll.

== Status ==
The IUCN has assessed the black-bodied woodpecker as Near Threatened. It has a somewhat limited range and an unknown population size that is believed to be decreasing. "The species is threatened by habitat loss through clearance of woodland for the expansion of agriculture and cattle-ranching, plantations of non-native trees, as well as selective logging of quebracho and algarrobo trees for charcoal." It apparently has two population centers, in Argentina's Córdoba and San Luis provinces and in central Paraguay, and is very scarce elsewhere.
