= Henry Baker Tristram =

English clergyman, Biblical scholar, traveller and ornithologist (1822–1906)

Henry Baker Tristram FRS
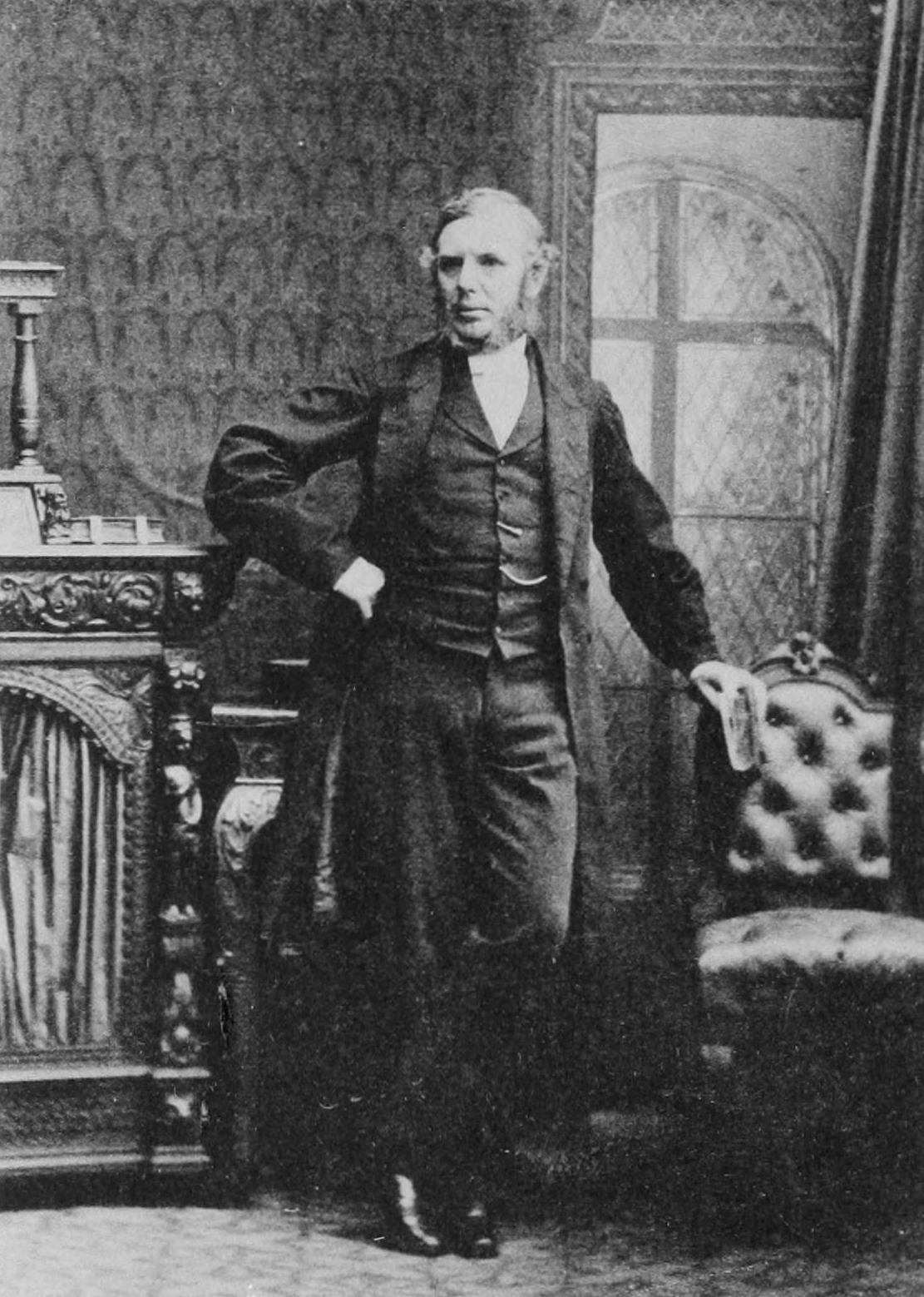
- Born: 11 May 1822; Eglingham, Northumberland, England
- Died: 8 March 1906 (aged 83); Durham
- Education: Lincoln College, Oxford
- Known for: Travel, science in Middle East; efforts to reconcile evolution with creation
- Children: Katherine Tristram
- Scientific career
- Fields: Clergyman, Ornithologist
- Institutions: Durham Cathedral
- Author abbrev. (botany): Tristram
- Author abbrev. (zoology): Tristram

Henry Baker Tristram FRS (11 May 1822 – 8 March 1906) was an English clergyman, Bible scholar, traveller and ornithologist. As a parson-naturalist he was an early, but short-lived, supporter of Darwinism, attempting to reconcile evolution and creation.

== Biography ==
He was the son of the Rev. Henry Baker Tristram, born at Eglingham vicarage, near Alnwick, Northumberland. He studied at Durham School and Lincoln College, Oxford. In 1846 he was ordained a priest.

== Diplomatic, scientific and missionary work ==
Tristram was secretary to the governor of Bermuda from 1847 to 1849. He explored the Sahara desert, and in 1858 visited Palestine, returning there in 1863 and 1872, and dividing his time between natural history observations and identifying localities mentioned in the Old and New Testaments. In 1873 he became canon of Durham Cathedral. In 1881 he travelled again to Palestine, the Lebanon, Mesopotamia, and Armenia. He also made a second voyage to Japan to visit his daughter, Katherine Alice Salvin Tristram, in 1891. She was a missionary and headteacher in Osaka. She was the first woman missionary with the Church Missionary Society to have a degree. In his journals taken during his travels in Palestine, he described Bedouins, Jews and Muslims in disparaging terms.

In 1858, he read the simultaneously published papers by Charles Darwin and Alfred Russel Wallace that were read in the Linnean Society, and published a paper in Ibis stating that given the "series of about 100 Larks of various species before me... I cannot help feeling convinced of the views set forth by Messrs Darwin and Wallace." He attempted to reconcile this early acceptance of evolution with creation. Following the famous Oxford Debate between Thomas Henry Huxley and Samuel Wilberforce, Tristram, after early acceptance of the theory, rejected Darwinism.

Tristram was a founder and original member of the British Ornithologists' Union, and appointed a fellow of the Royal Society in 1868. Edward Bartlett, an English ornithologist and son of Abraham Dee Bartlett, accompanied Tristram to Palestine in 1863–1864. During his travels he accumulated an extensive collection of bird skins, which he sold to the World Museum Liverpool.

== Published works ==
Tristram's publications included

- The Great Sahara (1860)
- The Land of Israel; a Journal of Travels in Palestine, Undertaken with Special Reference to Its Physical Character. London: Society for Promoting Christian Knowledge. 1865.
- The Natural History of the Bible (1867); 10th edition (1911)
- Scenes in the East (1870)
- The Daughters of Syria (1872)
- The Land of Moab; travels and discoveries on the east side of the Dead Sea and the Jordan. New York: Harper & Brothers. 1865.
- Pathways of Palestine (1882)
- The Fauna and Flora of Palestine (1884)
  - The Survey of Western Palestine: The Fauna and Flora of Palestine (1884)
- Eastern Customs in Bible Lands (1894) and Rambles in Japan (1895)

== Legacy ==
A number of birds were named after him, including Tristram's starling (also called Tristram's grackle), Tristram's bunting, Tristram's warbler, Tristram's woodpecker, Tristram's serin, and Tristram's storm-petrel. He also lent his name to the gerbil Meriones tristrami (also called Tristram's jird). He is also commemorated in the scientific name of a species of lizard, Acanthodactylus tristrami.

== Private life ==
He married Eleanor Mary Bowlby in Cheltenham on 5 February 1850. Their eight children included missionary and headteacher Katherine Alice Salvin Tristram.

== Sources ==
- Armstrong, Patrick (2000). The English Parson-naturalist: A Companionship Between Science and Religion. Gracewing. ISBN 978-0-85244-516-7.
- Buckland, A.R. (2004). "Tristram, Henry Baker (1822–1906)". Oxford Dictionary of National Biography (online ed.). Oxford University Press. doi:10.1093/ref:odnb/36560. (Subscription, Wikipedia Library access or UK public library membership required.)
