= Camerons Brewery =

Brewery established in County Durham, England

- Type: Private limited company with share capital
- Industry: Brewing
- Founded: 1865
- Founder: John William Cameron
- Headquarters: Stranton, Hartlepool, England
- Area served: United Kingdom
- Key people: David Soley (Chairman) Christopher Soley (Chief Executive)
- Products: Beer
- Production output: 1 million hectolitre
- Revenue: ▼£54,304,200 (2013)
- Operating income: ▼£1,831,270 (2013)
- Net income: ▼ -£406,233 (2013)
- Total assets: ▼£54,909,104 (2013)
- Number of employees: 145 (2013)
- Website: www.cameronsbrewery.com

Camerons Brewery is an English brewery established by John William Cameron in Stranton, Hartlepool, County Durham, in 1865. It is the largest independent brewer in the North East of England, with a brewery capacity of 1.5 million hectolitres (900,000 hl production in 2012) and a tied estate of 75 houses. It is one of the oldest industrial concerns in Hartlepool, and has historically been one of the largest employers.

After one hundred years of growth through brewery acquisitions, the company had an estate of 750 licensed premises throughout the North East and North Yorkshire by the 1960s. The company subsequently struggled as the economy of its trading heartland suffered, and as it underwent a succession of owners with little experience of pub and brewery management. Camerons lost its independence to Ellerman Lines in 1974, and was acquired by the Barclay Brothers in 1983 and then Brent Walker in 1989. Brent Walker spun-off the majority of the tied estate as a separate company called Pubmaster, which was acquired by Punch Taverns in 2003.

Camerons was purchased by Wolverhampton & Dudley (now called Marston's Brewery) in 1992, who invested heavily in the brewery before selling the company to Castle Eden in 2002, who closed their own site and moved all production to Camerons. The company now has a relatively small tied estate but the ninth largest brewery in the country. As a result, around 80 per cent of its business involves contract brewing for other companies, such as Heineken.

Camerons is known across the United Kingdom for Strongarm, a distinctive ruby red bitter launched in 1955. Total production of Strongarm surpassed one billion pints in 2000.

== History ==
=== Early history ===
A 250-foot artesian well has been used for brewing on the site since at least 1572. William Waldon (1805 – 1854), a farmer originally from Gainford, founded the Lion Brewery in the village of Stranton (subsequently a part of West Hartlepool) on land he bought from Ralph Walker for £300 in 1852. After Waldon's death in 1854, the brewery passed to his widow, Jane. John William Cameron was recruited to manage the brewery from 1865. In 1872 he took on the brewery and its 16 public houses under a 21-year lease. Henry Wilson, of the Phoenix Works in Stockton-on-Tees, built new brewery facilities for John Cameron in 1875. Further land for expansion of the brewery was purchased in 1876. Between 1885 and 1890 more land was bought and plans were made to build a new brewery. The present brewery building was completed in 1892. When the lease expired in 1893, Cameron purchased the brewery outright from the Waldons for £34,442.

=== Public listing and acquisition trail ===
In 1894 the company went public, valued at £345,000, and owned 119 public houses. John William Cameron used this juncture to enter into semi-retirement, and managerial responsibility was devolved to his brother, Watson Cameron (died 1920).

Nixey, Coleclough & Baxter of the Brunswick Brewery in Hartlepool, was acquired in 1895, along with around 80 public houses. It had been the largest competing brewery in Hartlepool. The newly acquired brewery was closed in 1898, and Nixey and Baxter were both appointed to the Camerons board.

John William Cameron died in 1896, by which time the brewery was one of the largest in the North of England. John Ellerman became a major shareholder, and was appointed vice chairman.

In 1897, T E Chapman & Son of Sunderland was acquired with 83 public houses, and its managing director, Abel Chapman, joined the Cameron board of directors. That same year, the Lion Brewery was further extended, to a 70 quarter capacity, capable of producing 130,000 barrels a year. In 1899 Camerons began to bottle mineral water and the company continued to expand. By this time 400 licensed premises were owned, including the majority of Hartlepool's public houses. The company prospered, and by 1907 the share capital of the company was £350,000 with another £350,000 of capital in the form of mortgage debenture stock.

In 1910, Heslop's Grange Brewery in Stockton was acquired along with 28 licensed houses. John Ellerman was company chairman by 1913. In 1915 the Lion Brewery was damaged by German shellfire. In 1920 Watson Cameron died, and A. J. Morgan and H. J. Hewlett became joint managing directors of the company. Morgan was in charge of organization and the offices, whilst Hewlett was in charge of brewing. Robert Newton Ltd of Newcastle was acquired, with 35 licences, and Plews and Sons Ltd of Darlington, with 100 licensed premises.

In 1922, Watson's son, John Watson Cameron joined the company, and in 1935 he was made chairman and managing director. The company share price doubled in value between 1933 and 1938. Cameron's ale was sold as far north as Newbiggin-by-the-Sea in Northumberland, as far east as Guisborough, as far west as Hawes and as far south as Thirsk by 1938. Directly and indirectly the company employed 1,500 people. Cameron's owned 46 per cent of all public houses within the Borough of Hartlepool by 1939.

In March 1955, Strongarm bitter was introduced, as the industrial workers of West Hartlepool demanded a stronger pint.

A controlling interest was acquired in John J Hunt, which owned the Ebor Brewery in York and Scarborough & Whitby Breweries along with 221 licensed public houses for around £400,000 in 1953. In 1956 J Fryer & Sons of Brompton-on-Swale was acquired. In 1959 the West Auckland Brewery was acquired with 80 licensed public houses. The company owned around 700 public houses by 1960.

In 1961 Russell & Wrangham of Malton, with 90 licensed public houses. was acquired from Tetley Walker. By 1967 the company had a market capitalization of £6.7 million, or £106 million in 2013 prices. In 1971, John Watson Cameron retired as managing director, although he remained as executive chairman, and his son, John Martin Cameron, became managing director. Cameron's introduced its own "lager" brand, Icegold, in 1972. Icegold was top fermented and actually a very pale ale rather than an authentic lager.

=== Corporate ownership ===
In January 1974, Ellerman Lines acquired the 25 per cent stake in Cameron's previously owned by Sir John Ellerman, 2nd Baronet, who had died. Directors and Cameron family members held a nine per cent stake and Bass Charrington held ten per cent.

Ellerman Lines acquired Camerons for £14 million in 1975, in an attempt to diversify from its declining shipping business. Camerons owned 500 pubs and 100 off-licences. Ellerman was accused of treating the brewery as a "cash cow".

In 1980 Hansa lager was launched, brewed under licence from Dortmunder Actien Brauerei. Camerons spent £2 million to upgrade their brewing facilities in order to brew bottom fermented lager, in what CAMRA described as "the most ambitious [lager-brewing scheme] for a regional brewer yet". The company had sales of £51 million in 1981, and one per cent of the British beer market. Market share in the Tees Valley area was 25 per cent.

In 1983, Ellerman Lines was acquired by the Barclay brothers for £45 million. In 1984, the Barclays attempted to sell Camerons to Scottish & Newcastle for £44 million, but the brothers cancelled the negotiations when the government referred the deal to the Monopolies Commission.

John Martin Cameron retired as chairman in 1985, thus ending the family link to the business.

In 1985, Cameron's held five per cent of the UK beer market. In 1985, the maltings building was demolished. Alistair Arkley was appointed managing director in 1985. Arkley split the pub and the brewing sides of the company into separate divisions, and divested the low-margin off-licence business. In 1986, Cameron's acquired 90 pubs from Mansfield Brewery, including 78 northern pubs and clubs, most of which were former North Country Breweries outlets, for £13 million. In 1988, the company expanded into the North West for the first time after it acquired 17 pubs in north Lancashire.

Camerons and Tolly Cobbold were sold to Brent Walker for £248 million in 1988. It was suggested that Brent Walker had overpaid for the business. Camerons controlled 480 licensed public houses and 270 hotels and off-licences. Brent Walker announced plans to invest £10 million in the tied estate, and to expand distribution in the South of England and Europe. In 1989 Camerons Brewery was described as one of the most efficient in the country, with a total annual capacity of over 500,000 barrels and production of 400,000. In an attempt to cut costs Brent Walker began brewing with lower standard ingredients, and Camerons developed a reputation for poor quality beer.

In 1991, the heavily-indebted Brent Walker sold the brewery and 51 pubs to Wolverhampton & Dudley for £18.7 million, beating a rival offer from the management. Brent Walker retained the bulk of the Cameron's estate, which it spun off as a Hartlepool-headquartered pubco called Pubmaster, which controlled 1,600 pubs and was sold to a syndicate of investment groups for £171.3 million in 1996. Meanwhile, the soft drinks arm was spun off under a management buyout called Orchid Drinks, with brands including Purdey's and Amé (acquired by Britvic in 2000 for £67 million).

W&D had acquired a company that was in a "sorry state". Initially, brewery staff numbers were reduced from 360 to 120, and part of the brewery was mothballed, after W&D ended a contract to brew Labatt lager at the plant. However, W&D invested heavily in the brewery site and marketing, and the profitability of the brewery greatly improved. By 1995 W&D had doubled the size of the Cameron pub estate they inherited to 101 pubs. Wolverhampton & Dudley brought a return of top quality malt and hops, and it was widely suggested by customers that the Camerons beers were greatly improved.

In 1997, contract brewing returned to the plant, with a licence to brew Foster's lager. By 1997, Cameron's market share in the North East had grown to 10 per cent, supplying pubs from Alnwick to Hull. In 1998, £1 million was spent on a new filtration and fermentation system and a keg plant at the brewery. In 1999, a further £500,000 was invested in the previously mothballed areas of the brewery to bring it to its full capacity of 400,000 barrels after it won a series of contracts to brew Harp Lager, Heineken and Kronenbourg.

Total production of Strongarm surpassed one billion pints (5.7 million hectolitres) in 2000. The 2002 Good Beer Guide remarked that the Strongarm was "Now substantially improved and with consistent character".

=== Independence ===
Castle Eden Brewery, owned by David Soley, acquired Camerons in April 2002 for £35 million, and relocated all operations to Hartlepool and closed down the Castle Eden plant. Soley later recalled, "what we really bought was a dilapidated old brewery that was falling apart".

The Kronenbourg 1664 contract was renewed by Scottish & Newcastle in December 2002. In 2003, £500,000 was spent to build a new bottling line and an on-site microbrewery, The Lion's Den. In 2008, Camerons spent £4 million expanding its capacity from 375,000 barrels to around 800,000 barrels. This followed the agreement of a contract with Scottish & Newcastle to supply Kronenbourg 1664, Foster's and John Smith's bitter until 2019. Previously the brewery had only produced Kronenbourg 1664.

In 2013, Camerons acquired the Hexham-based Head of Steam craft beer chain, including seven outlets, in a deal financially backed by Carlsberg. Camerons acquired the Leeds Brewery estate of seven pubs in 2016.

Camerons won the contract to brew the Sharps Brewery cask ales in 2026.

== Operations ==
In 2011, the brewery had a capacity of over 1.5 million hectolitres (over 1 million barrels) per annum. Production in 2012 was 900,000 hectolitres, with around 40,000 hl in own brand sales. The bulk of the brewery's own production is cask conditioned ale but it also sells bottled and keg ales. The company's best known beer is Strongarm, a 4% abv bitter that was introduced in 1955. Strongarm is made with 18 per cent crystal malt, which contributes significantly to its distinctive ruby red colour and its roasted, malty flavour.

Malted barley is sourced from Yorkshire and Scotland.

Its arrangements with brewing companies include a contract to produce Kingfisher lager.

The company owns 75 public houses.

Although the Dutch brewer Heineken holds a 24 per cent stake in the company, it is a silent partner, with no board representation or managerial control.

== The Lion Brewery ==
The brewery building is called the Lion Brewery. The Lion Brewery has two wells, one of them 250 feet deep. Most of the brewery was built in 1890 when the company had aspirations to supply the whole of the North East. There are still a few reminders of lavish opulence; the floor and walls of the brewhouse are furnished with Italian marble that cost £7,000 in 1970. Roger Protz described it as "one of the finest brewhouses in the country".

In 2011, the brewery had a capacity of over 1.5 million hectolitres per annum. It is the ninth largest brewery in the UK. It has twelve Yorkshire Squares for brewing ale.

In 2013, the brewery building was used as a filming location in the "Prodigal Son" episode of Vera.

A £700,000 visitor centre was opened next to the brewery in 2004, in the former Stranton Arms public house.

== Advertising and sponsorship ==
In 1996, a £500,000 television and radio campaign saw Camerons Strongarm advertised across Yorkshire and the Midlands for the first time.

Camerons was one of the first breweries to sponsor football kits, with Middlesbrough FC from 1984 to 1986 and Hartlepool United from 1985 to 1990 and 1993–2000.
