= Rinsan County =

Rinsan County 린산군
- County

Korean transcription(s)
  - Hanja: 麟山郡
  - McCune-Reischauer: Rinsan-gun
  - Revised Romanization: Rinsan-gun
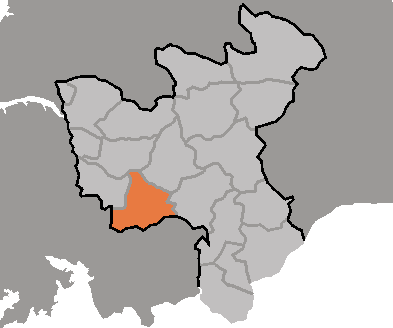
- Map of North Hwanghae showing the location of Rinsan
- Country: North Korea
- Province: North Hwanghae Province

Area
  - Total: 499 km^{2} (193 sq mi)

Population (2008)
  - Total: 73,626
  - Density: 148/km^{2} (382/sq mi)

Rinsan is a county in North Hwanghae province, North Korea. The county is home to Nuchon-ni air base.

== Administrative divisions ==
Rinsan county is divided into 1 ŭp (town) and 19 ri (villages):

- Rinsan-ŭp
- Anch'ang-ri
- Chaam-ri
- Chinch'ŏl-li
- Chit'aeng-ri
- Kich'ol-li
- Kiril-li
- Naengjŏng-ri
- Paekch'ŏl-li
- P'yŏnghwa-ri
- Sangha-ri
- Sangwŏl-li
- Sŏkkyo-ri
- Sŏkryŏl-li
- Suhyŏl-li
- Taech'ol-li
- Tajŏl-li
- Tongsa-ri
- Yongsŏng-ri
- Yŏnp'ung-ri
