= All Bar One =

British bar chain

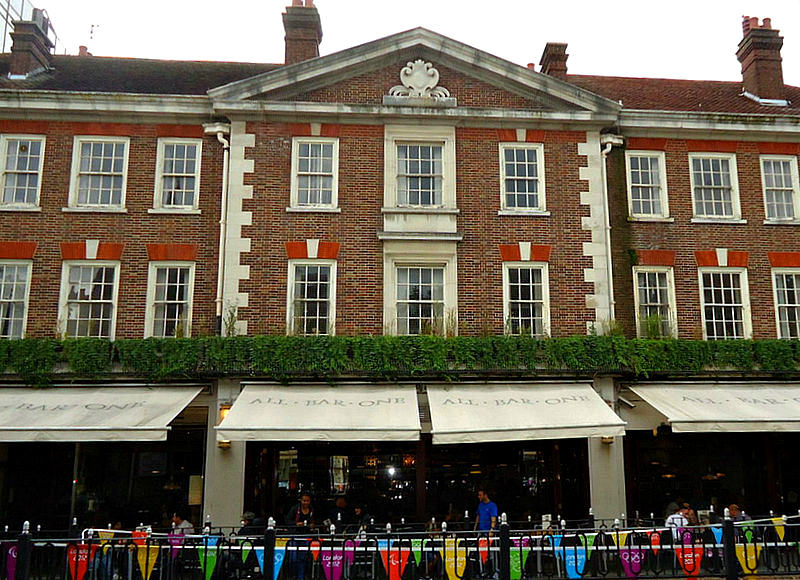
The first bar - in Sutton, Greater London.

All Bar One is a chain consisting of 56 bars in the United Kingdom, owned and operated by Mitchells and Butlers plc which was part of the Six Continents group (previously Bass) until 2003.

== Décor ==
The concept was designed by Bass as a 'female friendly' bar at a time when many pubs and bars were considered intimidating places for single women to go and drink or eat, with glass frontages, open-plan space, and bright, airy interiors. The design was formulated by Amanda Wilmott in February 1994. This followed the lead of existing female-friendly bar chains such as Pitcher & Piano and Slug and Lettuce. Wilmott, a former director of Slug & Lettuce, designed a similar chain for Yates Brothers Wine Lodges called Ha! Ha! Bar & Canteen, which first opened in February 1998 in Bristol; Mitchells & Butlers bought the brand's 22 pubs for £19m from Bay Restaurant Group in September 2010, converting some of them to All Bar One bars. Bass Leisure Retail opened another chain, Edward's, in the late 1990s that was similar.

== History ==
In October 1994, Wilmott found Mary-Jane Brook and Nelly Benstead to run the first outlet. The first bar was opened in December 1994 in Sutton, London, town centre by Bass Taverns, run by Sir Ian Prosser, who also owned Fork and Pitcher and Harvester. Bass bought Harvester in 1994. In its style, many pub chains have followed where All Bar One led.

Five outlets opened in 1995 (including Islington, Wimbledon and Richmond in London). By 1996, Bass had 15 All Bar One bars, 69 O'Neill's pubs and 102 Harvesters. By 1999 there were 46 in the chain. Jeremy Spencer, a friend of gastropub-inventor Mike Belben, was responsible for creating the brand. In 1999, Jeremy Spencer was replaced by Karen Forrester (who previously ran O'Neills, and who now runs T.G.I. Fridays UK) who stayed until May 2001.

In August 2001 it opened its first overseas establishment in Cologne. Bass Leisure Retail (BLR) became Six Continents in June 2002.

As of 2016, there were "close to 50" outlets in the UK, mostly based in Central London however they have expanded throughout the UK as far as Aberdeen, where they opened a bar in the new Marischal Square development in March 2018.

== Estate ==
=== Scotland ===
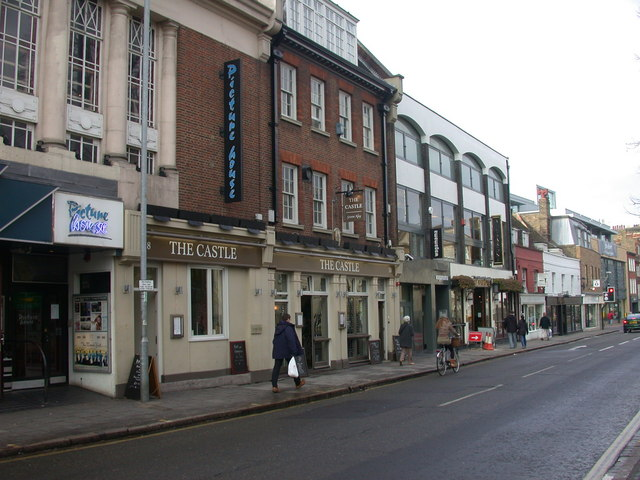
Cambridge

- Marischal Square, Aberdeen
- George Street, Edinburgh
- Exchange Plaza, Edinburgh
- Edinburgh Airport (Gate 5 and Gate 16)
- St. Vincent Street, Glasgow

=== Midlands ===
- Birmingham Airport (airside and landside)
- Birmingham New Street station
- Birmingham (Brindleyplace)
- Montpellier, Cheltenham
- Nottingham (Lace Market tram stop)

=== North West England ===
- Liverpool (Derby Square)
- King Street, Manchester
- Trafford Centre
- Chester (Pepper Street)

=== Yorkshire and the Humber ===
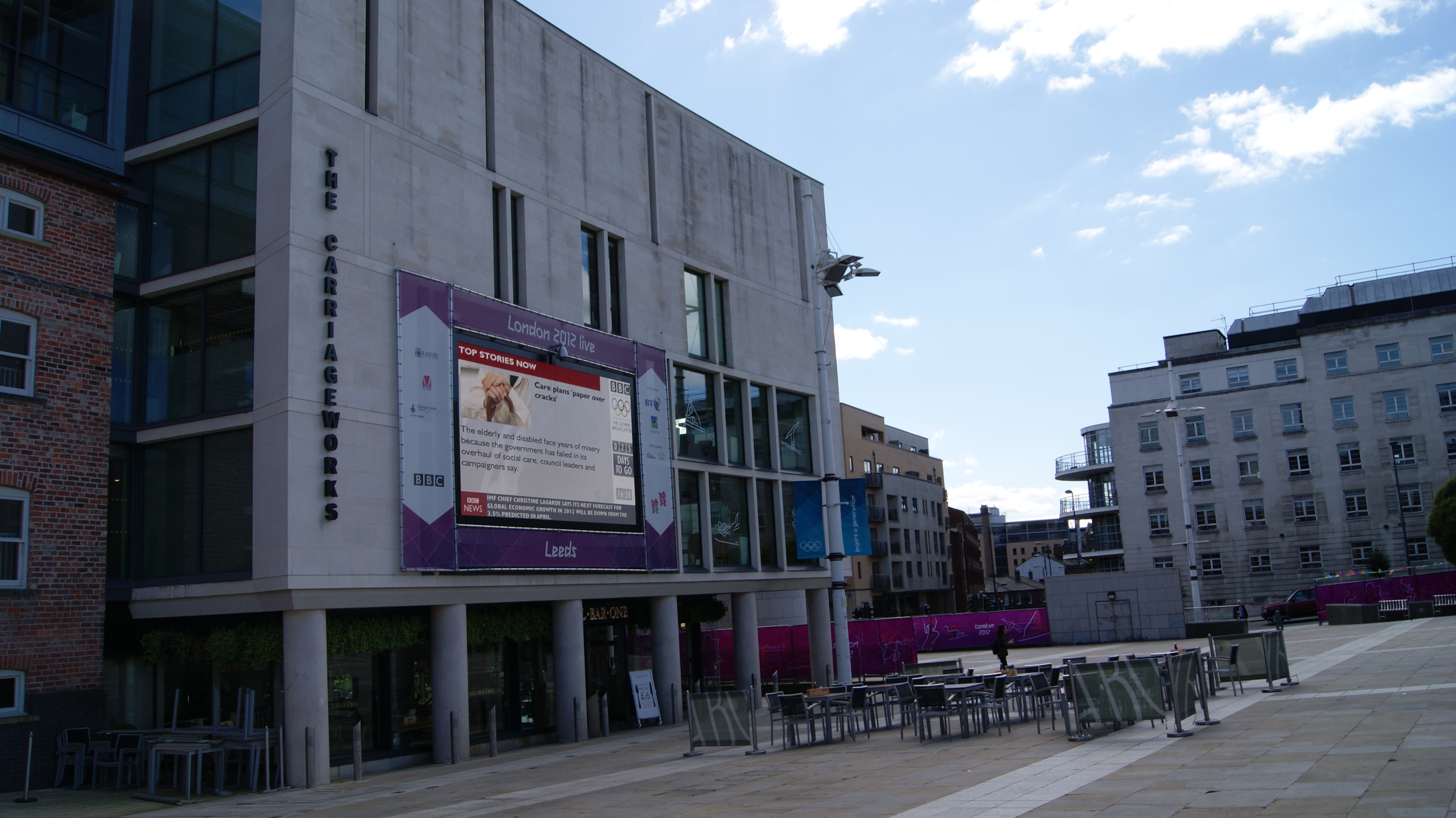
Leeds, Millennium Square

- Harrogate (Parliament Street, A61)
- Leeds (Millennium Square and Greek Street)
- Sheffield (Leopold Square)

=== South East England ===
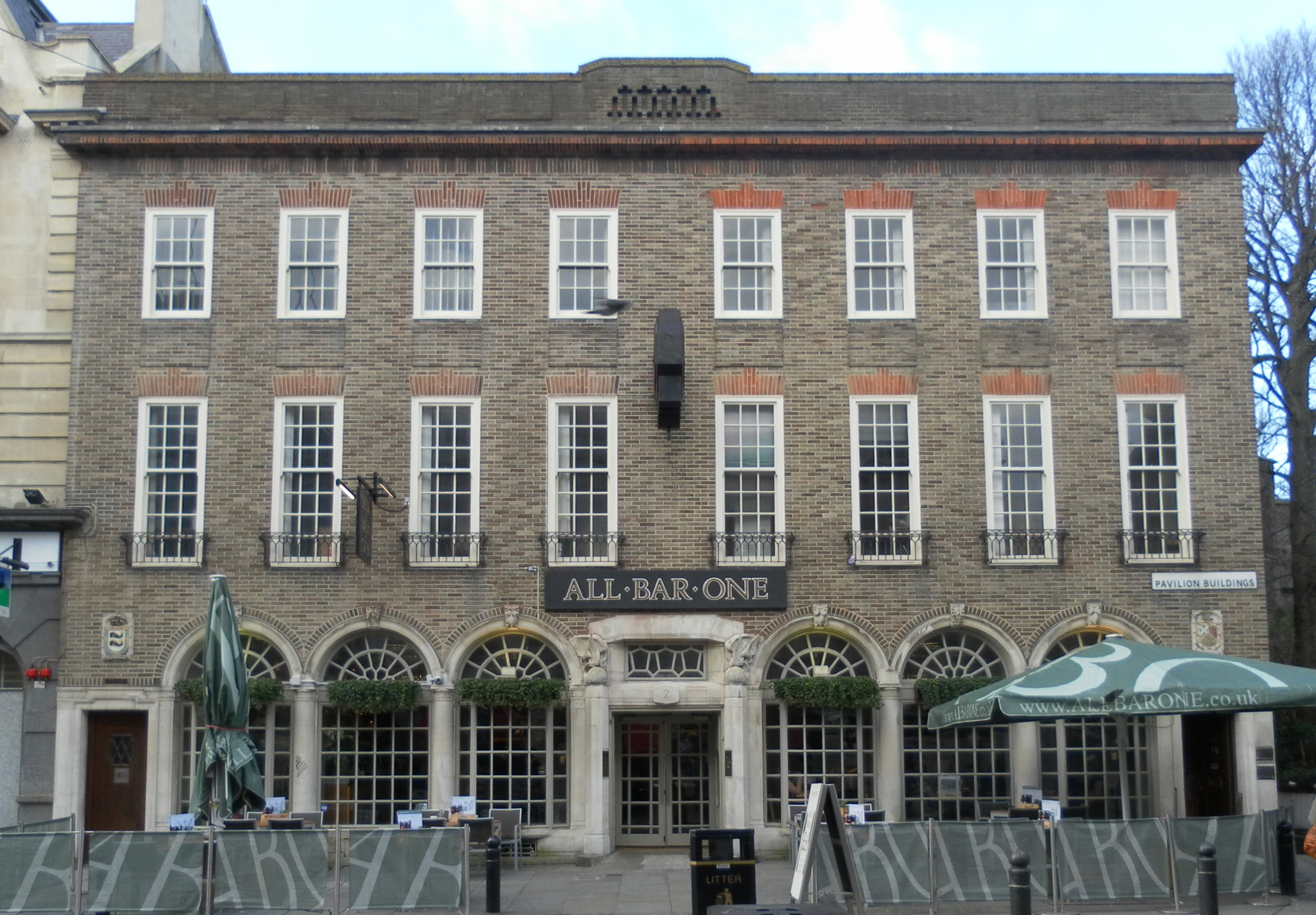
Brighton

- 2–3 Pavilion Buildings, Brighton
- Guildford (North Street)
- Milton Keynes (Midsummer Boulevard)
- High Street, Oxford
- Gunwharf Quays, Portsmouth
- The Oracle, Reading
- Westquay, Southampton
- Windsor Royal railway station

=== London ===
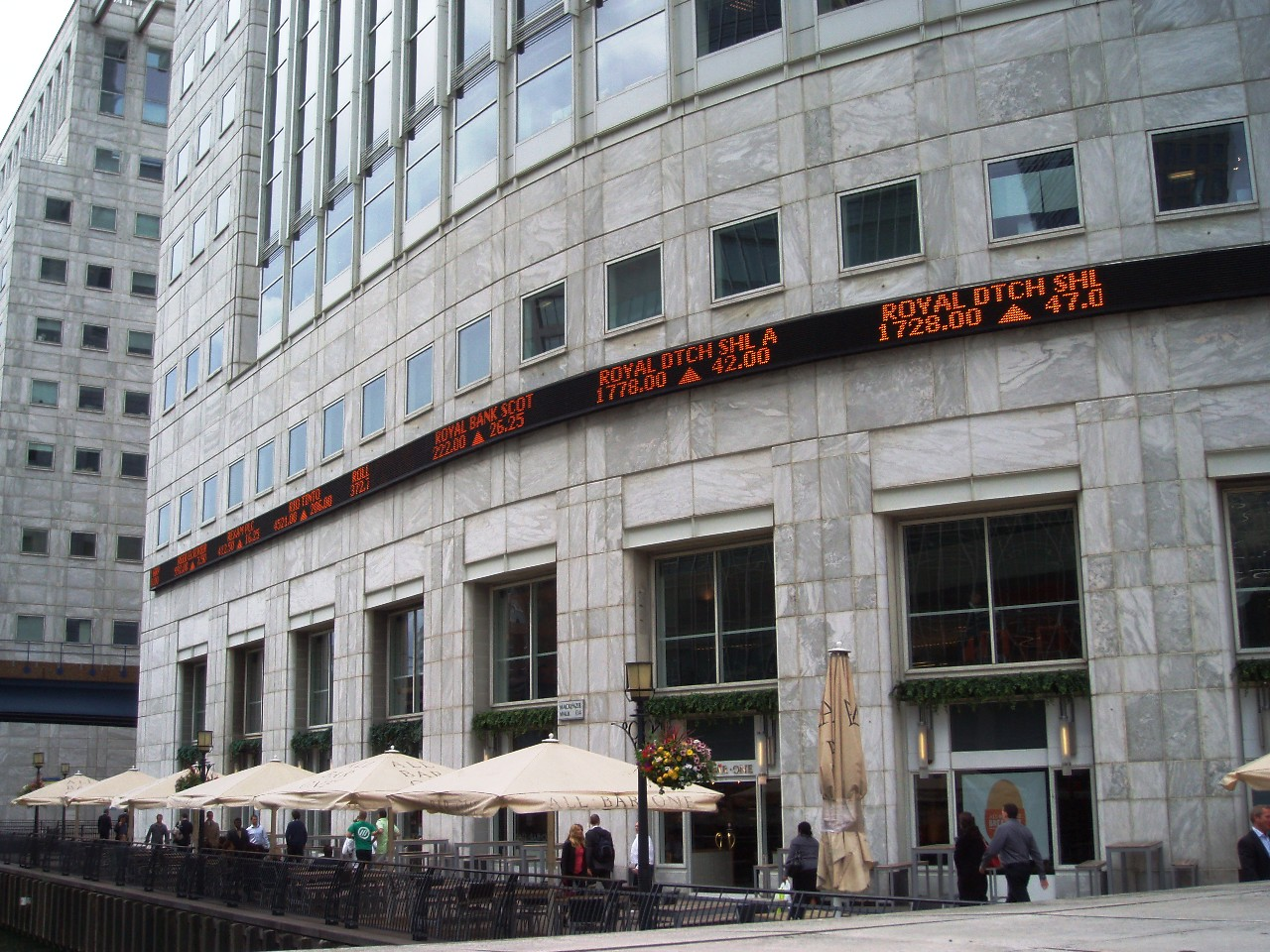
Canary Wharf

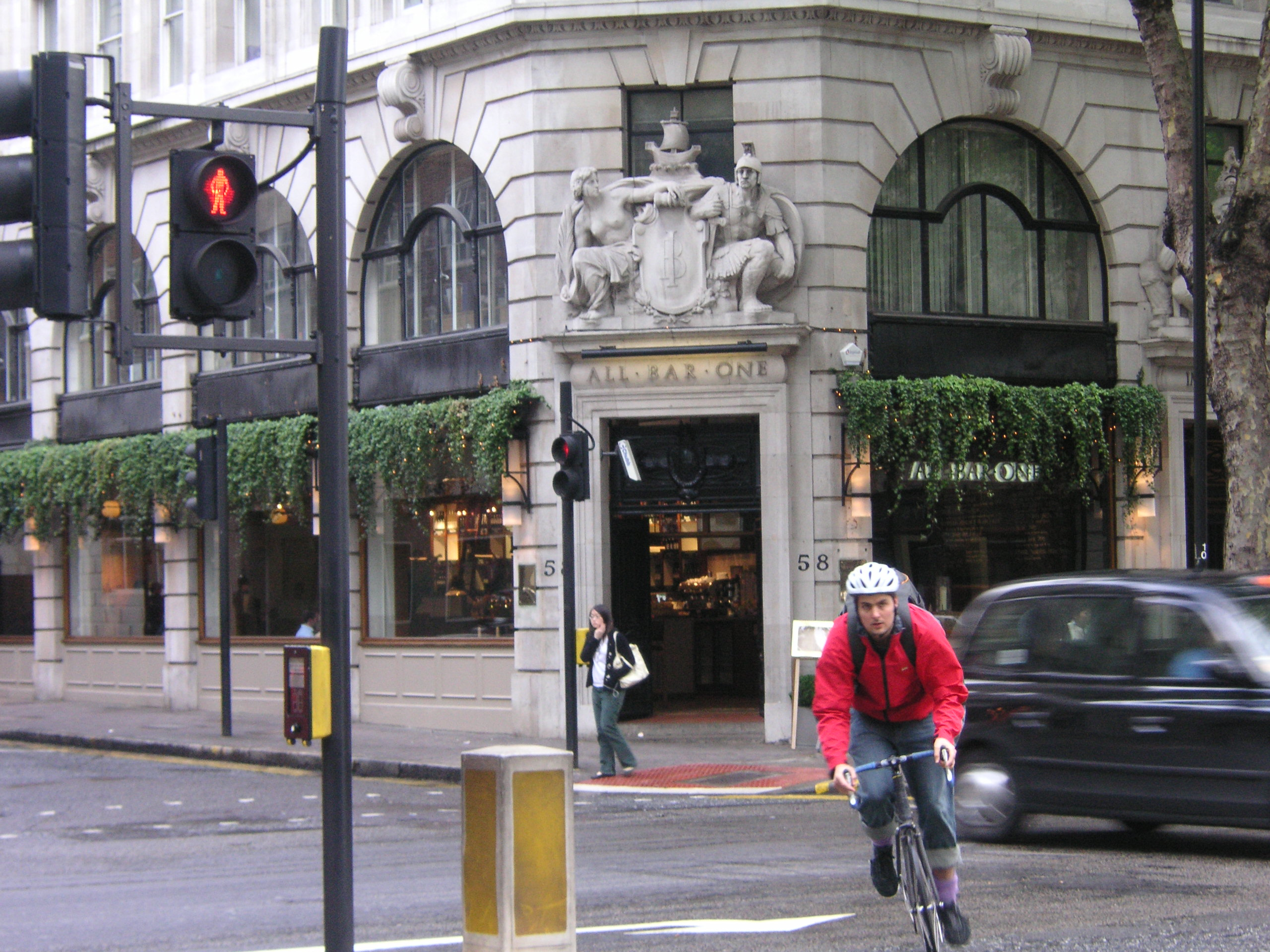
All Bar One, Holborn, London on Kingsway

- Appold Street (Broadgate)
- Northcote Road, Battersea
- Bishopsgate
- Shad Thames, Butler's Wharf
- Byward Street
- Cannon Street
- Chiswell Street
- Euston Square
- Henrietta Street, Covent Garden
- Houndsditch
- Kingsway, London (Holborn)
- Ludgate Hill
- The O2 Arena, Greenwich
- New Oxford Street
- Picton Place
- Regent Street
- Sutton (original in 1994)
- Victoria, London
- Villiers Street
- Waterloo
- Wimbledon (Wimbledon Hill Road)
