= Phil Urban =

CEO of Mitchells & Butlers

- Born: Philip Charles Urban; 9 February 1963 (age 63)
- Known for: CEO, Mitchells & Butlers

Philip Charles Urban (born 9 February 1963) is CEO of Mitchells & Butlers, which runs around 1,700 managed pubs, bars and restaurants throughout the United Kingdom.

== Early life ==
Philip Charles Urban was born in February 1963 in Wood Green. Urban has an MBA and is a qualified management accountant (CIMA). He went to the independent Latymer Upper School.

== Career ==
Urban's first job was in the finance graduate programme at Trusthouse Forte Hotels. He went on to work for Ladbrokes, Lloyd's Bank and Clifton Inns. Following this he moved to Whitbread, where he ran the pub restaurants division, and then the Rank Group. From 2 June 2008 to 31 October 2014, Urban was a director of Grovesnor Casinos.

In September 2015, Mitchells & Butlers issued a profits warning and dismissed CEO, Alistair Darby. He was replaced by Phil Urban, who joined as COO in January. His basic salary will be £510,000.

Business positions
| Preceded by Alistair Darby | Chief Executive of Mitchells & Butlers; September 2015 - | Succeeded by Incumbent |
| Preceded by | Chief Operating Officer of Mitchells & Butlers; January 2015 - September 2015 | Succeeded by |
| Preceded by | Managing Director of Grosvenor Casinos; June 2008 - 2014 | Succeeded by |
| Preceded by | Managing Director of Pub Restaurants (Whitbread - Beefeater and Brewers Fayre); November 2004 - June 2006 | Succeeded by |
| Preceded by | Managing Director of Pub Restaurants (Scottish & Newcastle Retail - Chef & Brewer); December 1999 - June 2004 | Succeeded by |
