= Carvery =

Restaurant or pub serving freshly sliced meat

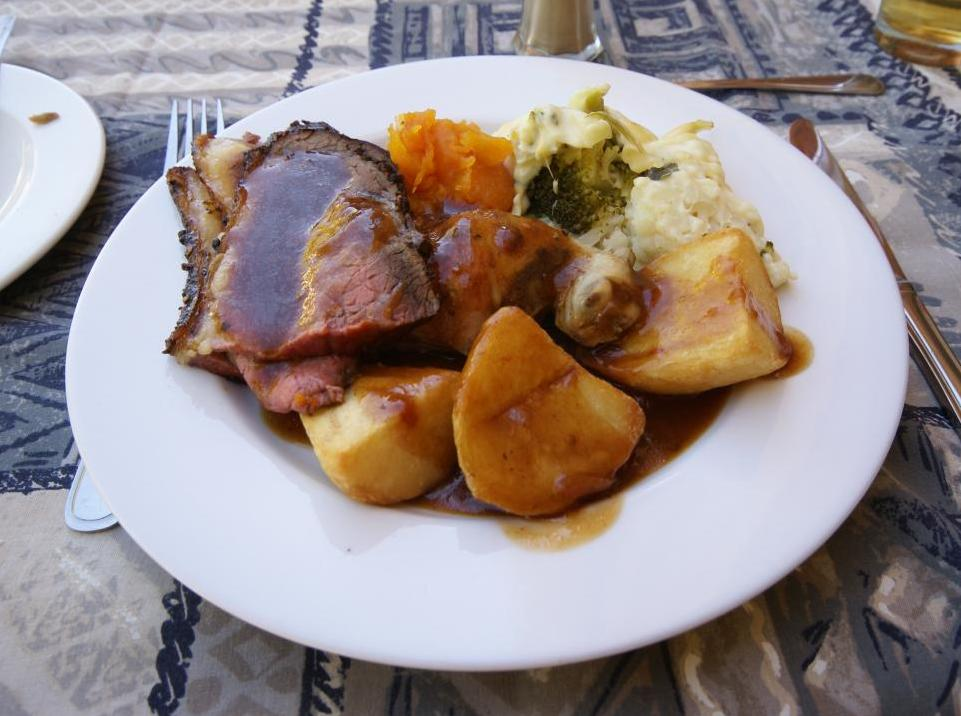
A typical carvery meal, from a pub in South Africa

A carvery is a pub or a restaurant where cooked meat is freshly sliced to order for customers, sometimes offering unlimited servings in a buffet style for a fixed price. The term is most commonly used in the United Kingdom, Ireland, Canada and Australia.

== Description ==
Carveries are often found in pubs and hotels, particularly on weekends, when they offer Sunday roasts to a large number of people. The meat is usually accompanied by potatoes, vegetables, stuffing, gravy and sauces.

Some restaurants in the United States use the term or concept, and it is a staple at some buffets.

== History ==
Carveries existed as early as 1956 in London, in two Lyons Corner Houses. One of the restaurants, in each of the Strand and the Tottenham Court Road Lyons, was a carvery. They provided a three-course meal with beverage, but all but the carvery items were served by a nippy (waitress). Even the carvery table had an employee to help those having difficulty in the actual carving. The price at this time was five shillings.

In the 1970s and later, many more carveries appeared in London. One well-known carvery was situated in the Regent Palace Hotel. The restaurant there was on the ground floor, the Art Deco ceiling of which has been reassembled in the new Air W1 building. Carvery food is now very popular and is now found in the whole of the UK.

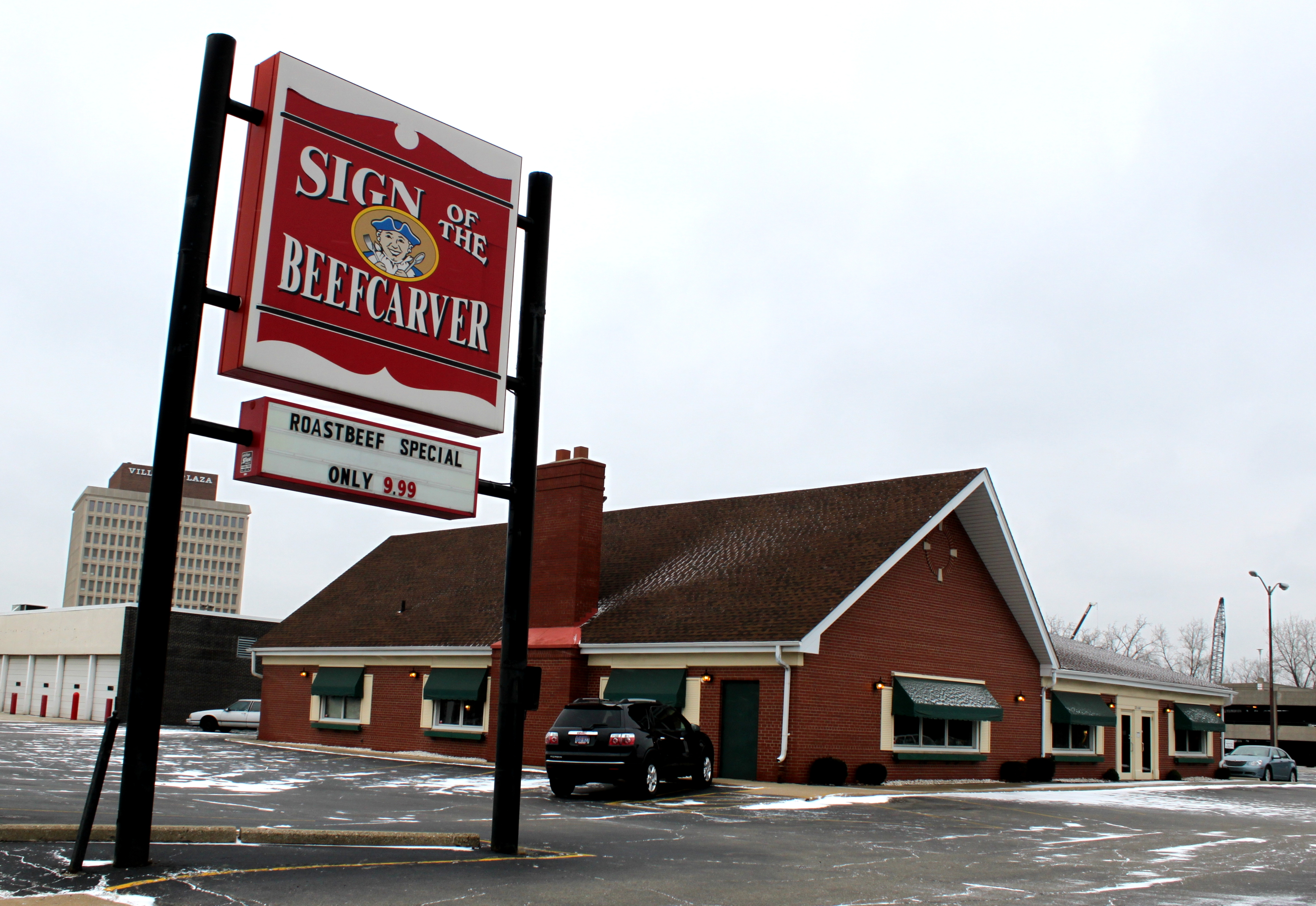
Sign of the Beefcarver restaurant, Dearborn, Michigan

Later carveries were operated by pub chains such as Harvester, Brewer's Fayre and Beefeater. The Toby Carvery brand took over many former Beefeater sites. Fuzzy's Grub was a noted but short-lived carvery chain in London, founded in 2002 and voted "Best Traditional British Restaurant, but all but the carv in London" in Harden's 2007 guide before going out of business in 2008.

== See also ==
- Rodízio, a style of service where the server cuts meat from a skewer at the table
- Hofbrau, a similar restaurant format
