= Six Continents =

Former large British-based hotel and hospitality business

Six Continents Hotels plc
- Type: Public
- Industry: Retail
- Predecessor: Bass plc
- Founded: 2000; 26 years ago in London, England, United Kingdom
- Defunct: 2003
- Fate: Renamed following demerger of Mitchells & Butlers
- Successor: InterContinental Hotels Group
- Headquarters: London, England, United Kingdom
- Key people: David Bland (Managing Director)
- Products: Hotel services Public Houses
- Website: sixcontinentshotels.com

Six Continents was a large British-based hotel and hospitality business which was listed on the London Stock Exchange and was once a constituent of the FTSE 100 Index.

== History ==
The company was formed in June 2000 when the brewing business of Bass plc was sold to the Belgian brewer Interbrew (now AB InBev) and the remaining hotel and pub holdings were renamed Six Continents plc.

In April 2001, Six Continents bought the UK-based Posthouse Hotels business from Compass Group for £810 million, and during the following year re-branded the 79 hotels to Holiday Inn.

In 2003 it de-merged into a pubs business, Mitchells & Butlers, and the remaining hotels and soft drinks business of Britvic, were renamed as InterContinental Hotels Group.

== Brands and companies ==
Six Continents owned, managed or franchised the hotel brands InterContinental, Crowne Plaza, Holiday Inn, Holiday Inn Express, and Staybridge Suites. Its pubs and restaurants included All Bar One, Browns, Edward's, Ember Inns, Harvester, Hollywood Bowl, It's A Scream, O'Neill's, Toby Carvery and Vintage Inns.
