= The Beehive, Welwyn Garden City =

Pub in Hertfordshire, England

Coordinates: 51°47′09″N 0°11′16″W

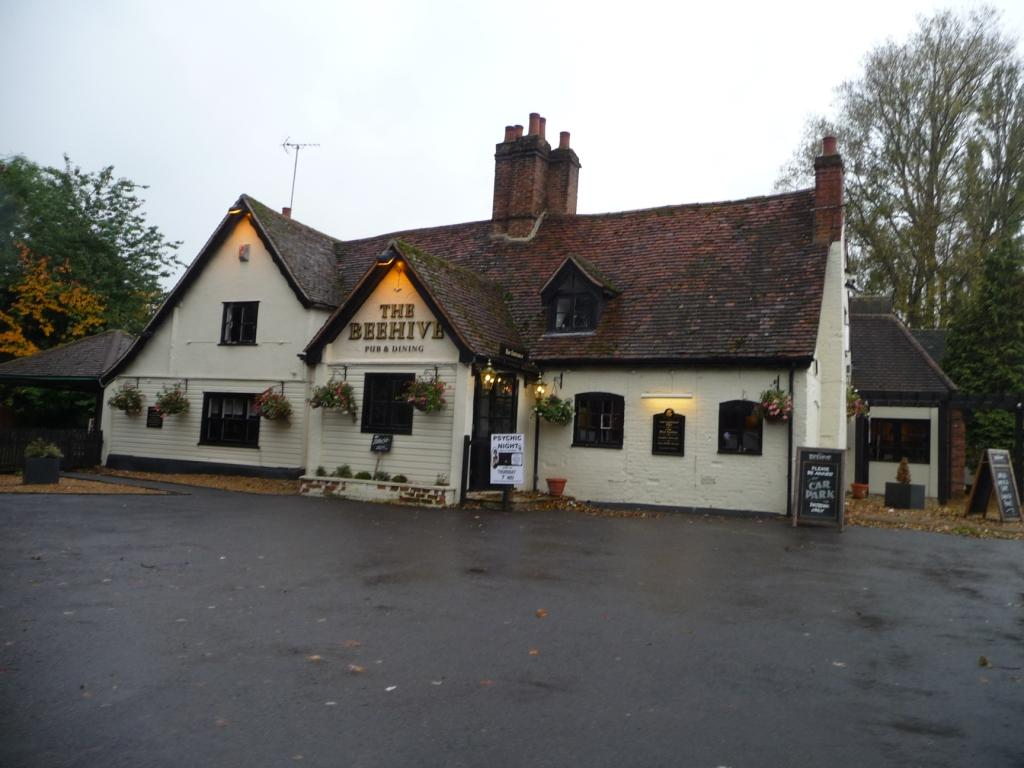
The Beehive

The Beehive is a grade II listed public house in Beehive Lane, Welwyn Garden City, in Hertfordshire. The building dates from around the early seventeenth century. It once served as a village store and later as a Beefeater steak house. The pub has been renovated to complement the beautiful historic building and opened as Coopers Grill Steak House up until its closure (2020), the restaurant also offered a premium Sunday Carvery which at the time was very popular.
