= Highland House =

Highland House can refer to:

- The former name of North Tower (Salford), a highrise building in Salford, Greater Manchester, England
- Highland House (Truro, Massachusetts), an historic house in Truro, Massachusetts, United States

Not to be confused with Hylands House, near Chelmsford, Essex, England, built 1726-1730
