= Toby Carvery tree felling =

Felling of a pendunculate oak in London, England

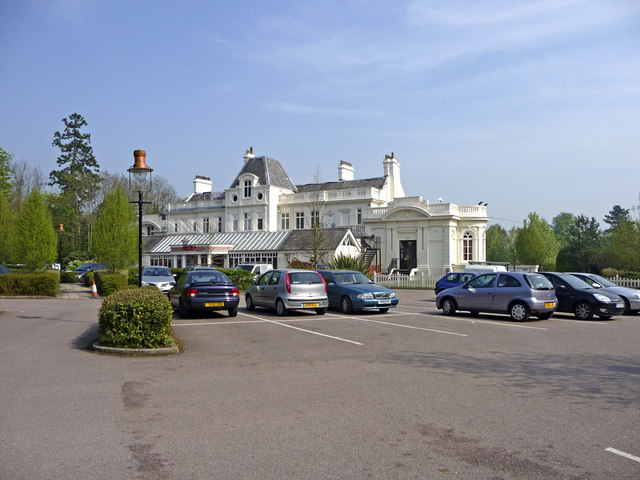
The tree was by the car park of the Toby Carvery establishment at Whitewebbs Park (pictured 2009)

On 3 April 2025, Ground Control, a contractor working for the owners of a nearby Toby Carvery restaurant Mitchells & Butlers, cut down a 500-year-old ancient pendunculate oak tree on land the company had leased in Whitewebbs Park in Enfield, London, in the United Kingdom. Though it was determined not to have been a crime, the felling led to a backlash from locals and environmental campaign groups, as well as international press coverage. After landowner Enfield London Borough Council pursued the eviction of Mitchells & Butlers from November 2025, in June 2026 the company settled the legal dispute by agreeing to plant an orchard in the borough.

== Background ==
The Whitewebbs Park tree, being around 500 years old, was a lapsed pollard, indicating that it was a part of historical land management. Over centuries, it matured into its own habitat, and was home to hundreds of species. The Woodland Trust has called it "one of London’s largest and most significant ancient trees"; it had a girth of 6.1 metres (20 ft), and ranked in the top 100 of London's 600,000 oak trees in terms of size. It was listed on the Woodland Trust inventory of ancient trees, but it was not subject to a tree preservation order (TPO) at the time. It was nicknamed the "Guy Fawkes Oak," due to its proximity to Whitewebbs House, where the Gunpowder Plot was planned.

In 2024, the tree was assessed by tree experts working for Tottenham Hotspur football club, which was planning to redevelop parkland next to the site; they called it a "fine specimen" with an expected life of at least 50 more years. The football club later stated that the tree sat outside its lease demise, and there is no evidence of the club having any connection to the decision to fell the tree. An inspection in December that year by Enfield Council deemed that the tree was "healthy" and "posed no risk" to the neighbouring car park. In February 2025, Enfield Council gave Tottenham Hotspur a 25-year lease to build a new Women's and Girls' Training Centre & Academy on the site of a former golf course in the park; Campaigners had fought these proposals. On 23 March, Ergin Erbil, the leader of Enfield Council, accepted five free tickets from the Tottenham Hotspur FC Foundation watch a veterans match, and later declared this as hospitality. He had spoken to the club's executive Donna-Maria Cullen, but was not lobbied by the club, and they did not speak about the Whitewebbs development or the lease option on the Toby Carvery site.

The issue of tree preservation was a relevant topic at the time, following the destruction of the Sycamore Gap tree in September 2023. Enfield London Borough Council had leased the land to the restaurant chain Toby Carvery, which is owned by the company Mitchells & Butlers.

== Felling ==
On 3 April 2025, Ground Control, a contractor working for Mitchells & Butlers, cut down the tree. Ground Control cited a large split in one of its main branches as the reason it had agreed to remove the tree. The council was not informed of the decision to do so. The same day, council workers discovered what remained of the trunk, still surrounded by the felled branches around it. A large portion of the tree's trunk remained, and the felling itself was noticed by few people for 12 days. The contractors used vans without company logos to complete the work, meaning Ground Control would not be publicly identified until April 2026.

== Responses ==
=== Official responses ===
On 15 April, the Metropolitan Police closed its investigation, treating the felling as a civil matter, and believing there was no evidence of criminality. An emergency tree preservation order (TPO) was imposed on the remaining stump. This was accompanied by a burst of national press coverage of the tree.

Leader of Enfield Council, Ergin Erbil, said in a statement on 16 April that the council was considering legal action and had "evidence that this tree was alive and starting to grow new spring leaves when this action was taken." He further stated that the felling had "broken the terms of the lease which requires Toby Carvery to maintain and protect the existing landscape. The tree was the oldest one on site and cutting it down seems to be a clear breach of this condition. This tree would have been home to countless wildlife, fungi, and pollinators. This tree is a part of our ecological and cultural heritage". A Mitchells & Butlers spokesman said that the felling was "an important action to protect our employees and guests as well as the wider general public."

On 17 April, chief executive of Mitchells & Butlers Phil Urban wrote to residents apologising "for all the upset that [the felling] ha[d] caused," and that the company had "acted in good faith" when it greenlit the felling, stating that the potential penalties if the company had failed to "act on all health & safety issues" were "too great to contemplate", leading to the felling being fast-tracked.

On 24 April, the Forestry Commission began an investigation into the felling. This was announced by junior environment minister and member of the House of Lords Sue Hayman, who spoke in the House of Lords that the felling "ha[d] opened up a nerve in the country about how important it is that our really ancient trees are properly protected."

Another emergency tree preservation order was placed on the entire site leased to Toby Carvery on 1 May 2025, to remain in place for 6 months to allow council officers to determine if permanent orders applied. Enfield Council stated it was considering further TPOs across Whitewebbs Park.

=== Response by the public and campaigners ===
Locals' immediate responses to the felling appeared mixed, with some describing the felling as "shocking" and others saying the issue was "blown out of proportion." Some residents launched a petition which called for the expedited survey of every tree in the park; this gained 39,000 signatures. On Easter Sunday, 20 April, hundreds of people gathered to protest the felling, and held a commemorative silence as part of "a period of mourning" for the tree.

The felling led campaigners to push for greater protections for trees; Paul Powlesland of Lawyers for Nature wrote that "A building the same age as this tree would almost certainly be listed (council owned or not), and we should have an equivalent system for trees, with equivalent enforcement and punishment." The Woodland Trust echoed this call. In July, the chair of London City Hall’s Environment Committee, Leonie Cooper, asked for a review of the existing legislation to protect trees in a letter to Environment Secretary Steve Reed, noting the felling of the Whitewebbs Park tree.

== Eviction proceedings and settlement ==
In November 2025, Enfield Council began pursuing the eviction of Mitchells & Butlers by serving a formal section 146 notice at Edmonton county court, seeking forfeiture of its lease. The council stated that Mitchells & Butlers had refused to apologise or offer compensation for the felling.

On 3 April 2026, the contractor who had felled the tree was revealed by The Guardian as Ground Control. The Guardian heard from sources that the work had been led by Ground Control’s grounds maintenance team, which had less tree expertise, rather than its team of arborists.

On 10 June 2026, Mitchells & Butlers settled their legal dispute with Enfield Council, and through this agreed to pay for the council's legal costs as well as for the replanting of an orchard in the borough.
