= Browns Restaurants =

British restaurant chain

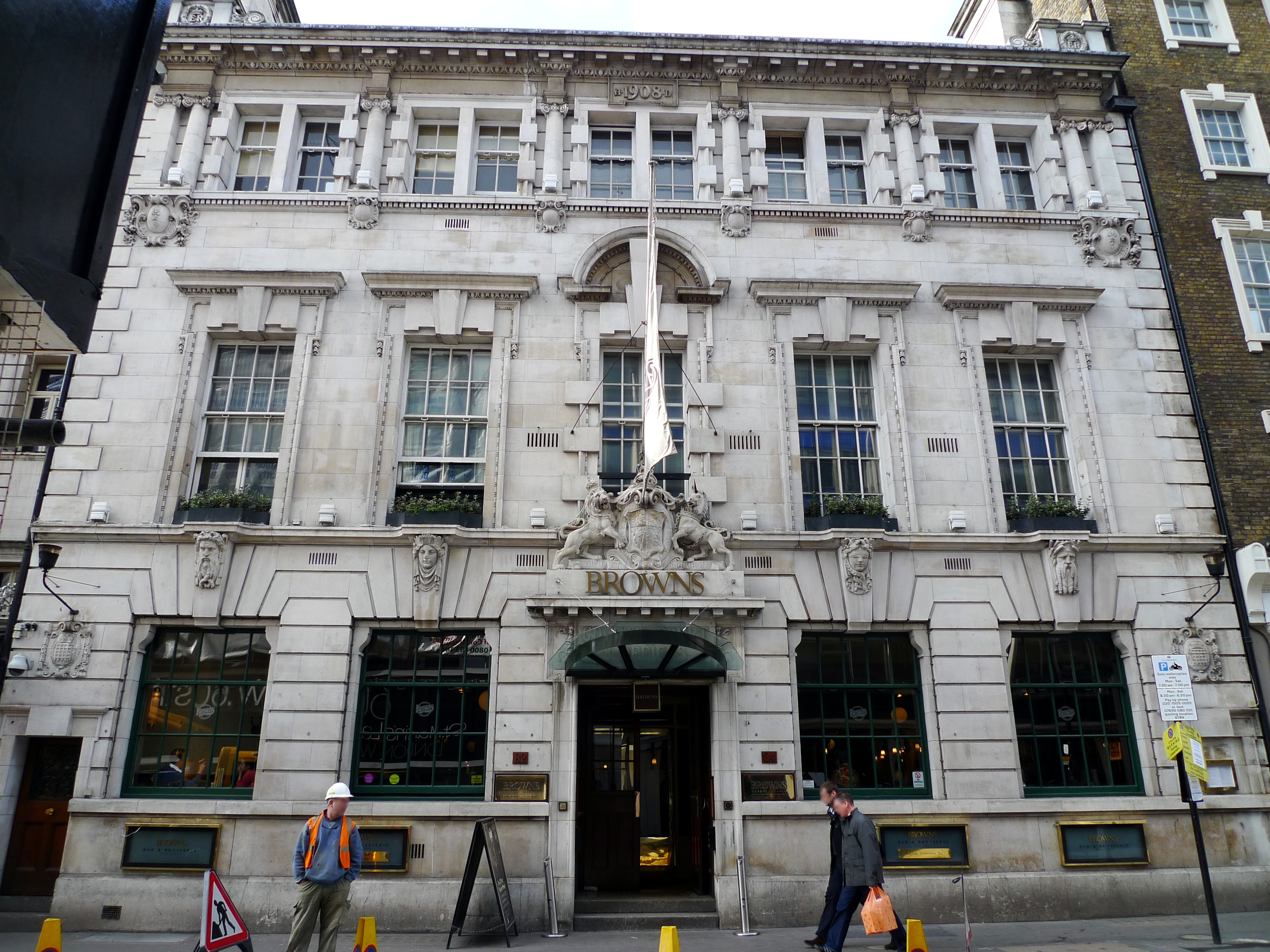
- Browns Restaurant in Covent Garden, central London
- Parent: Mitchells & Butlers

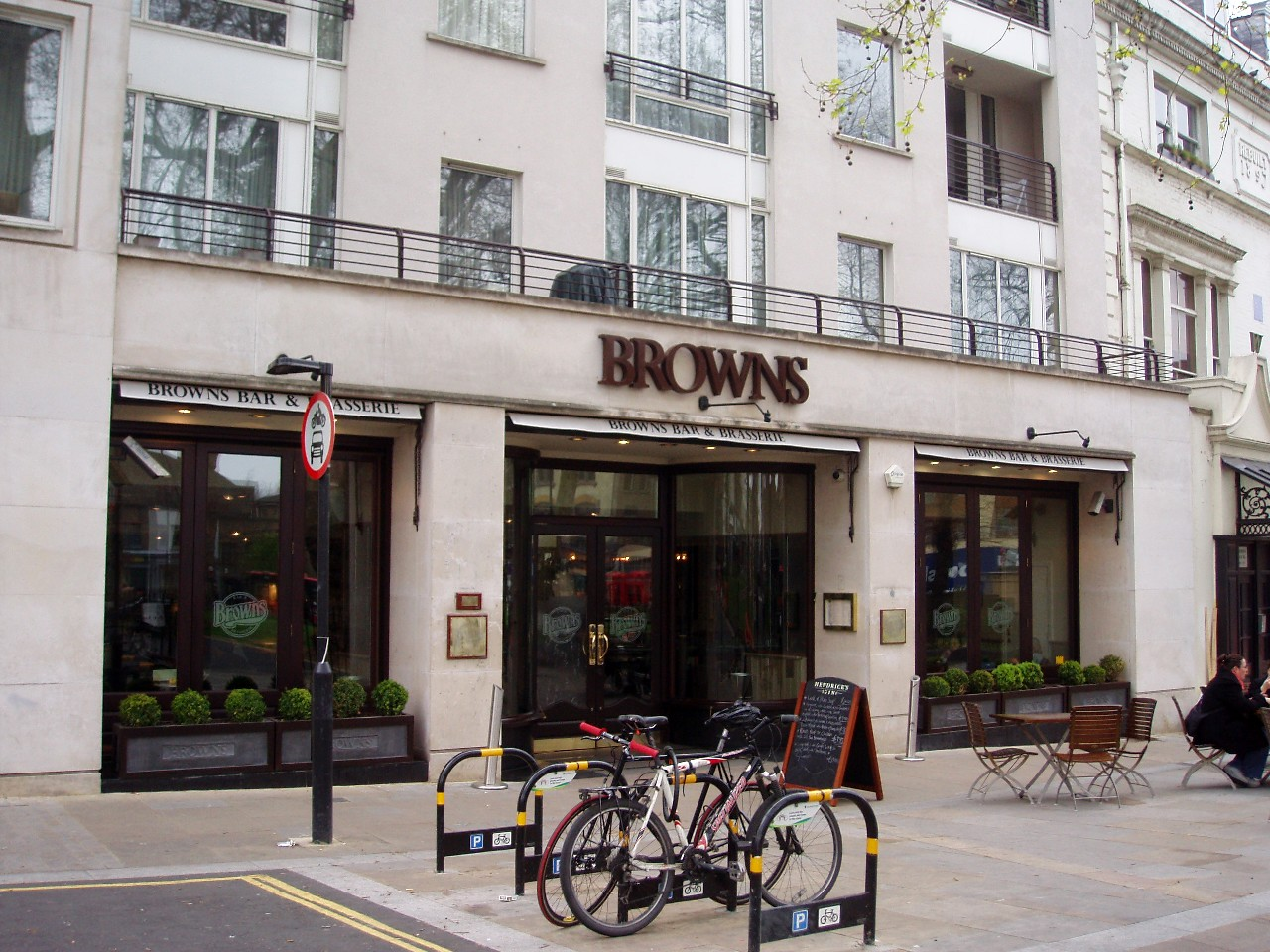
Browns Restaurant in Islington, north London – now closed

Browns Brasserie & Bar is a British chain of restaurants owned by Mitchells & Butlers, with sites mostly located in the south of England.

Browns was the first hospitality venture established by Jeremy Mogford, who in 1973 invested £10,000 (of which £2,500 was borrowed from his father) in the first Browns Restaurant and Bar in Brighton, East Sussex. He established a chain of seven restaurants, mostly in university towns such as Bristol, Cambridge and Oxford, with an annual turnover of £15 million. In 1996, Mogford sold the Browns chain to Bass Brewery for £35 million.

Mogford was regarded as one of the industry's best and most enlightened employers, which was reflected in a low staff turnover rate. He and his restaurants were used as a case study in a hospitality and entrepreneurship textbook illustrating commitment to employees. In addition, Browns was profiled in a widely used capacity management study by Deterministics Inc. for Cornell University's Cornell Hotel and Restaurant Administration Quarterly journal.
