= Hofbrau =

Carvery-style restaurant

Hofbrau, also known as Hoffbrau, and Hof Brau, is an American cafeteria-style restaurant concept, similar to a carvery. The name is derived from the German term Hofbräu, which originally referred to a brewery with historical ties to a royal court. Hofbraus emerged in San Francisco, California just after World War II, and spread through Northern California and elsewhere. The concept is in decline in the 21st century, though it still exists.

== Food ==
The choice of meats offered at most hofbraus includes some form of roast beef such as prime rib, tri-tip, or brisket; some form of salt-cured meat such as corned beef, pastrami, or ham; a whole roasted bird such as turkey or chicken; and sometimes buffalo.

Meals are typically served as sandwiches or as plated dinners, per the customer's preference. Sandwiches are often served au jus on sourdough rolls in French dip style, or open with beef jus or gravy ladled over the sandwich at the carvery station. Dinners often come with a side of mashed potatoes and gravy, with gravy ladled over both the potatoes and the meat. In addition, a dinner roll with butter plus a choice of hot and cold side dishes is included. Hot sides often include corn, macaroni and cheese, rice, and green beans. Cold sides often include macaroni or pasta salad, potato salad, or regular iceberg lettuce salad.

Beer on tap is commonly available at most hofbraus. Liquor is sometimes available, and most alcoholic drinks are generally inexpensive.

== History in Texas ==
The Original Hoffbrau Steakhouse in Austin, Texas was founded in 1932. The restaurant chain Hoffbrau Steak & Grill House in Dallas was founded in 1978, and was inspired by the concept of the Original Hoffbrau Steakhouse in Austin, but was unrelated.

== History in California ==
Al Pollack's Tommy's Joynt in 2012

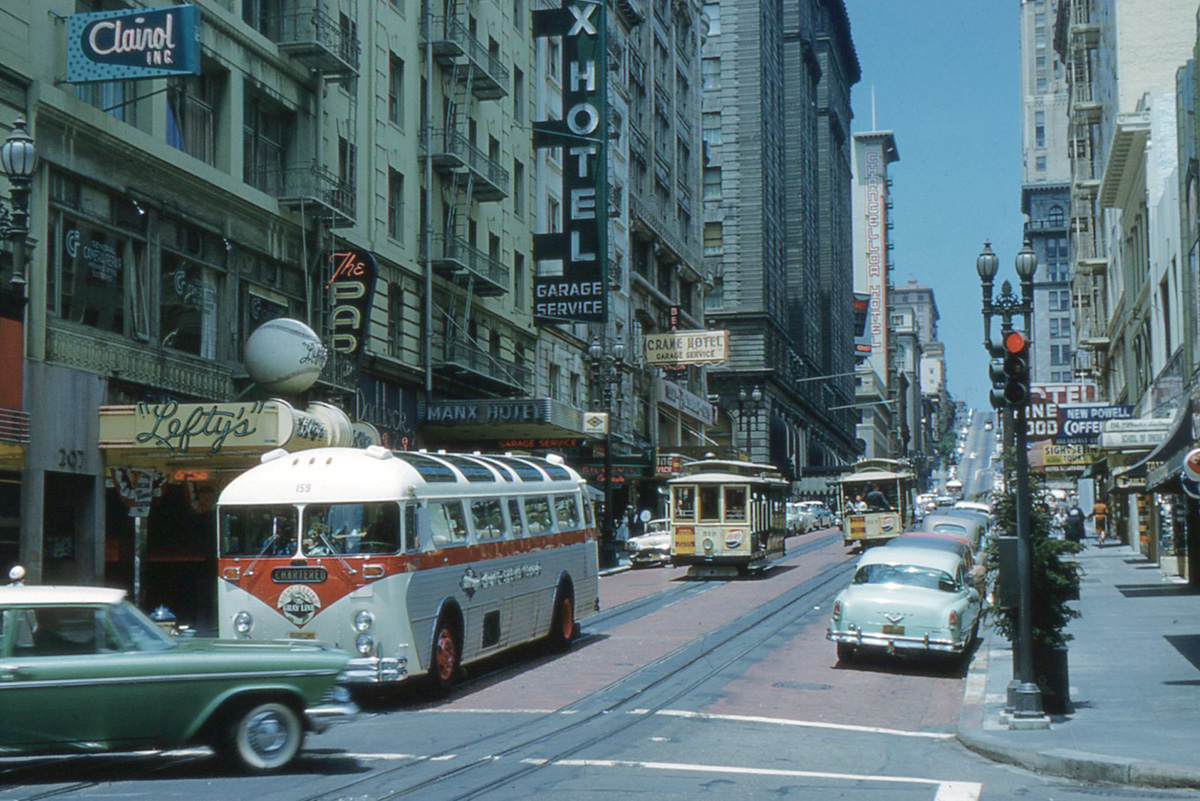
Al Pollack's Lefty O'Doul's in 1959

This restaurant concept was developed in San Francisco following World War II, and spread throughout Northern California.

In 1947, Albert Pollack opened the Almond Blossom Restaurant on Van Ness Avenue at Geary in San Francisco. KFRC vocalist Tommy Harris, his cousin, became his partner in the restaurant. It was renamed Tommy's Joynt in 1951. In 1957, Pollack sold his share to his cousin, Billy Veprin. In 1958, the 34-room boarding house above Tommy's Joynt was demolished. In the 1960s and 1970s, Pollack owned Slattery's, the Main Stem, Hink's, the Red Chimney and the Leopard Cafe. In 1979, Pollack bought back Billy Veprin's share of Tommy's Joynt, when Tommy Harris retired. As of 2023, Tommy's Joynt is still in operation. Robert E. Mason, a chef who became a partner, added buffalo stew to the menu, after a chance conversation with a diner visiting from a Wyoming buffalo ranch. In 1986, Tommy's Joynt is where Metallica invited bassist Jason Newsted to join the group after the death of Cliff Burton. In 2015, restaurateur Chris Henry purchased Tommy's Joynt.

In the 1950s, successful restaurant chains like Harry's Hofbrau, Sam's Hofbrau and Chick-n-Coop were established in Northern California.

In 1958, Albert Pollack and partner Lefty O'Doul opened Lefty O'Doul's restaurant and bar at Union Square on Geary Street. Lefty O'Douls, a beloved hofbrau on Union Square in San Francisco since 1958, closed in 2017 after a bitter dispute with their landlord. Hofbraus have declined in business success and popularity in the 21st century.

In 2018, Brennan's, a popular hofbrau in Berkeley, closed after 60 years in business.

In 2019, Harry's Hofbrau, once a larger chain, lost the lease on its San Jose restaurant. That restaurant then closed, after 42 years in business. As of 2023, Harry's Hofbrau has two locations, in San Leandro and Redwood City.

In 2023, Sam's Hof Brau, in business in Sacramento for 64 years, was severely damaged by a fire. In January, 2024, the owners announced that Sam's Hof Brau would not reopen.

== Operations ==
Many restaurants are laid out cafeteria-style: customers take a tray and utensils at the beginning of a long steam table, place meat orders at the carvery station, add side dishes as they move down the line, pay the cashier at the end of the line, and then seat themselves.

Expansive dining areas are generally available at larger hofbraus, and are typically used as meeting places for large groups of people who gather to eat, drink, watch sports on television, and have parties.

== See also ==
- Carvery
