= Harvester (restaurant) =

British casual dining restaurant chain

- Industry: Hospitality
- Founded: 1983
- Founder: Courage Brewery
- Headquarters: 27 Fleet Street, Birmingham
- Area served: United Kingdom
- Key people: CEO Phil Urban
- Products: 230 restaurants
- Parent: Mitchells & Butlers
- Website: harvester.co.uk

Harvester is a casual dining restaurant chain in the United Kingdom. The first, The George Inn, opened in 1983 in Morden, South London. The chain, set up by Courage Brewery to compete with Whitbread's Beefeater restaurants and Grand Metropolitan's Berni Inns, is currently run by Mitchells & Butlers. It serves burgers, salad, traditional British pub food and drinks.

== Early history ==
Courage Brewery, who were owned by Imperial Tobacco had expanded the Harvester brand by converting 70 sites. Imperial were purchased by Hanson Trust plc in 1986, and Courage was sold as part of Hanson's divestment of Imperial's non tobacco interests, with the company being purchased by Elders Limited, the Australian brewer of Foster's Lager. Elders sold the Harvester brand onto Trusthouse Forte.

== Bass ==
On 21 July 1995, Bass bought the seventy eight restaurants of Harvester for £165 million from the Forte Group. Whitbread had offered £150 million to acquire the chain. Most Harvesters were in the South East, and Bass had plans to rebrand other restaurants (such as the former Innkeeper's Fayre) elsewhere in England as Harvesters. When Bass divested its brewing division in 2000, the chain came under the renamed company, Six Continents, until 2003.

== Mitchells & Butlers ==
On 15 April 2003, Six Continents was demerged into Intercontinental Hotels Group, to operate the hotels, and Mitchells & Butlers, for pubs and restaurants, which had 127 outlets.

In 2006, Mitchells & Butlers acquired 239 standalone Brewers Fayre and Beefeater sites without a Premier Inn or where planning permissions for Premier Inn could not be obtained by Whitbread. Former Brewers Fayre sites were converted into Harvester, and former Beefeaters were converted into Toby Carvery, its sister brand. In July 2008, it bought 44 more standalone Beefeater and Brewers Fayre sites, in exchange for 21 Express by Holiday Inn hotels.

On 31 July 2008, Harvester was featured on an episode of the BBC One show Rogue Restaurants and was shown to be operating without regard to certain food hygiene regulations.

== Return to television and radio advertising ==
For the first time in ten years, Harvester Restaurants spent nearly £20,000 on advertising on both television in the United Kingdom, and radio stations in July 2010. The advertising campaign was part of a general shift within Mitchells & Butlers, to focus on businesses that were food led. As part of the marketing campaign, they also run "free ice cream vouchers when you order main meal" campaigns periodically.

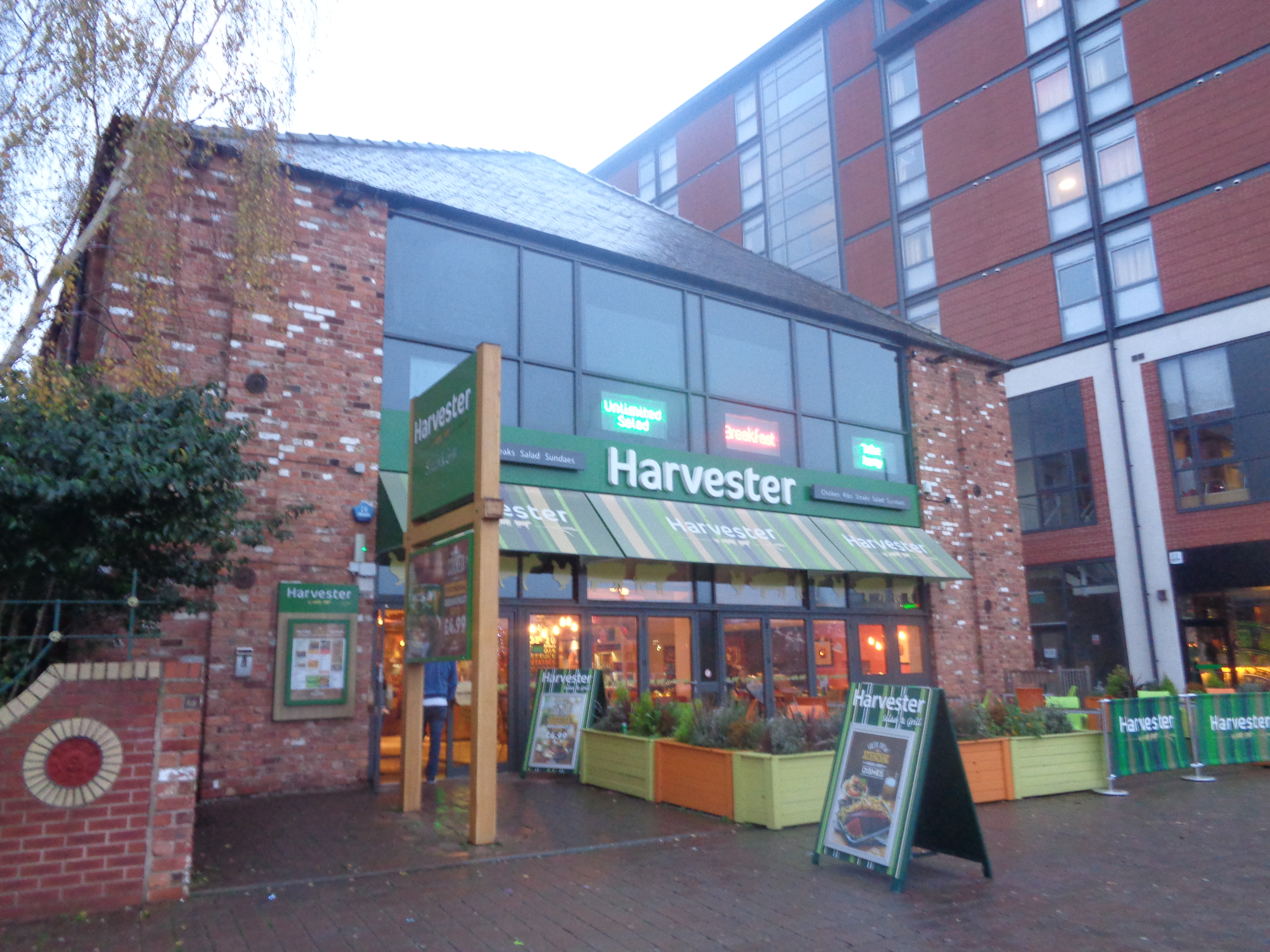
Harvester at Brayford Wharf, Lincoln, in 2015 with newer branding.

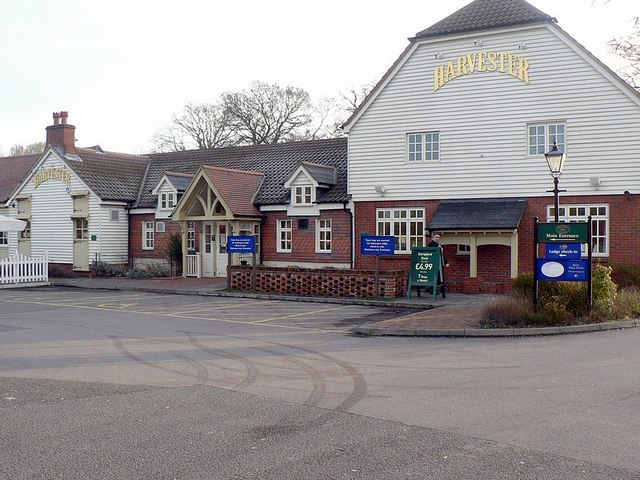
Harvester in Fleet, Hampshire in 2009 with former branding.

== Colchester Harvester fire ==
The Harvester in Stanway Colchester burnt down by accident on the 14 October 2026, with emergency services arriving at 12:50 AM on 15 October

== See also ==
- Brewers Fayre, owned by Whitbread
- Beefeater, owned by Whitbread
- Toby Carvery, also owned by M & B
- List of restaurant chains
