= Premier Inn =

British hotel chain

Premier Inn Limited
- Type: Subsidiary; Private limited company
- Industry: Hospitality
- Founded: 1987; 39 years ago
- Founder: Whitbread
- Headquarters: Dunstable, England, UK
- Area served: United Kingdom -Isle of Man -Guernsey -Jersey; United Arab Emirates; India (2009-2016); Ireland; Germany; Austria; Qatar
- Key people: Dominic Paul (Group CEO); Simon Jones (Managing Director, UK); Mark Anderson (Managing Director, International)
- Parent: Whitbread
- Website: premierinn.com

Premier Inn Limited, a subsidiary of Whitbread, is a British limited-service hotel chain with operations in the United Kingdom, Ireland, Germany, Austria, United Arab Emirates, and Qatar. As of 2026, the company owns and operates over 800 hotels, including 85,500 rooms in the UK and Ireland using the slogan 'You know what you're getting'. The company does not license franchises; all hotels are owned and operated by Whitbread.

The company was established by Whitbread as Travel Inn in 1987, to compete with Travelodge UK. Whitbread bought Premier Lodge in July 2004 and merged it with Travel Inn to form the current business under the name Premier Travel Inn, which was then shortened to the current name in October 2007. Premier Inn accounts for 70% of Whitbread's earnings.

In addition to Premier Inn, the company operates hotels under the brands Hub by Premier Inn, a city-centre format with smaller rooms but in-room technology such as tablets, and Zip by Premier Inn, a lower-priced and has a simplified food and drink service and smaller pod-like rooms, some without windows.

The chain has a policy of not listing on travel aggregator websites such as Expedia and Hotels.com.

== History ==
The chain started trading in 1987 as Travel Inn. The first site to open was next to The Watermill Beefeater restaurant in Basildon.

In July 2004, Whitbread acquired Premier Lodge, for £5 million. This added 141 hotels to the portfolio. Whitbread renamed every hotel Premier Travel Inn. Prior to the merger with Premier Lodge and rename, Travel Inn had also operated two sub-brands: Travel Inn Metro - for properties located in city centres, and Travel Inn Capital - for properties located in Central London.

In 2005, Premier Travel Inn opened its 500th hotel in Hemel Hempstead. In early 2006, Premier Travel Inn purchased 11 Holiday Inn hotels in England and Wales. These sites kept their leisure facilities such as a swimming pool and gym, except the hotel situated at Norman Cross Prison. Premier Travel Inn started to launch a new bedroom design during this year to move away from the differences of Travel Inn and Premier Lodge. Until then rooms had remained as they had been before, and new hotels were designed as Travel Inns.

In 2006, Premier Inn entered into a joint venture agreement with Emirates Group to launch in the Gulf Cooperation Council region. The joint venture identified three sites in Dubai, creating more than 800 new rooms. The first Premier Inn in Dubai to open was a 300-room hotel at Dubai Investment Park. A similar size hotel at Dubai Airport, and a 220-room hotel at Dubai Silicon Oasis on Emirates Road, were opened. Dubai Ibn Battuta Mall Hotel has also been opened, connected to Ibn Battuta Mall.

Whitbread shortened the name to Premier Inn in October 2007; by 2009 the business accounted for more than 70% of Whitbread's earnings. In September 2007, Whitbread announced the purchase of Golden Tulip UK including six hotels trading in the UK under the Tulip Inn and Golden Tulip brands. The hotels were converted to Premier Inns on 2 October 2007.

In September 2007, Premier Inn entered Ireland, when it took over the Tulip Inn in Swords, County Dublin.

On 2 October 2007, comedian Lenny Henry became the face of the company's advertising campaign.

In April 2008, Whitbread announced a £100 million expansion of Premier Inn in London over the following three years.

In July 2008, Whitbread bought 21 Holiday Inn Express hotels from Mitchells & Butlers in exchange for 44 Beefeater & Brewers Fayre restaurants where it was not possible to build a Premier Inn.

In October 2010, the Premier Inn hotels located at Roadchef and Moto motorway service stations were sold to Days Inn after the franchise agreement was terminated.

In 2011, the 600th hotel was opened in Stratford-upon-Avon. Premier Inn have sold off some of their smaller hotels (which had fewer than 30 rooms) to Good Night Inns. Most of these were Premier Lodge sites in less prominent locations. In July 2015, the 700th Premier Inn was opened in Kingston-upon-Thames, London.

In 2016, Premier Inn launched its first hotel in Germany, in Frankfurt. As of late February 2025, it operates 61 hotels in Germany, with 37 new hotels in development,

Also in 2016, the company began its exit from India and Southeast Asia.

In December 2020, the company added 13 hotels in Germany through the acquisition of Ninety Nine, Four Side, Centro and Boutique 009 hotels.

After the Grenfell Tower fire in June 2017, Premier Inn said three of its hotels in Maidenhead, Brentford and Tottenham were built with cladding. All three were tested and found to comply with building fire standards. None of them had the same type as Grenfell Tower.

In May 2017, Premier Inn opened its first location in Qatar Education City, next to Qatar National Convention Centre (QNCC). This hotel also has a swimming pool and gym. Premier Inn opened its second hotel in January 2020 near Hamad International Airport, which is also located in the close vicinity of Souq Waqif, National Museum of Qatar and Museum of Islamic Art, Doha.

In March 2019, the first Zip hotel was opened in Roath, Cardiff.

In 2019, Premier Inn acquired four sites in the Dublin city centre and Dublin Docklands including at Aungiers Street, Castleforbes Business Park, Gloucester Street South and Jervis Street.

In April 2023, the company acquired a hotel in Austria and 5 hotels in Germany for £28.4 million.

In 2024, the company made changes to its room design standard, including a movable circular desk/table instead of a static desk.

In February 2025, the company opened its first hotel in Vienna, Austria.

== Restaurants ==
All Premier Inns are built with a restaurant adjoined (often in a separate building). They provide their own selection of daytime meals but traditionally all served the Premier Inn breakfast. Former Travel Inn sites were mainly accompanied by Whitbread's Beefeater or Brewers Fayre restaurants and originally, TGI Fridays, until that brand was sold off to a third party. Roadchef restaurants were located alongside motorway service sites which were unlicensed and never served the Premier Inn breakfast selection.

Premier Lodge sites were accompanied by pubs owned by The Spirit Group such as Chef and Brewer or Millers Kitchen. Many inner-city and airport locations feature a brand called Thyme located within the hotel building. Originally, Travel Inn had Slice, and Premier Lodge has BarEst, which were identical to each other. The Kitchen was the name given to smaller city centre restaurants.

Former Holiday Inn Express sites have internal breakfast rooms where kitchens were added on to offer cooked breakfasts to guests, as EBHI used to only offer a continental selection. Those sites would have a Mitchells & Butlers restaurant next to it, but were run independently.

As restaurants have changed hands over recent years, many have started their own breakfast menus which has led Premier Inn to turn some of its rooms into small breakfast rooms and kitchens to continue offering their breakfast menus to guests at each site.

As of late 2024, many previous Beefeater, Brewers Fayre, Thyme and Table restaurants have had their branding removed. Some have become restaurants exclusively for Premier Inn guests, while many were to be converted to rooms or be sold as going concerns. The Social (a restaurant in many inns) was to remain open.

As of late 2026, Whitbread had exited all its restaurants and pubs, and Queensway Inns purchased 53 former Brewer's Fayre venues.

== Image gallery ==
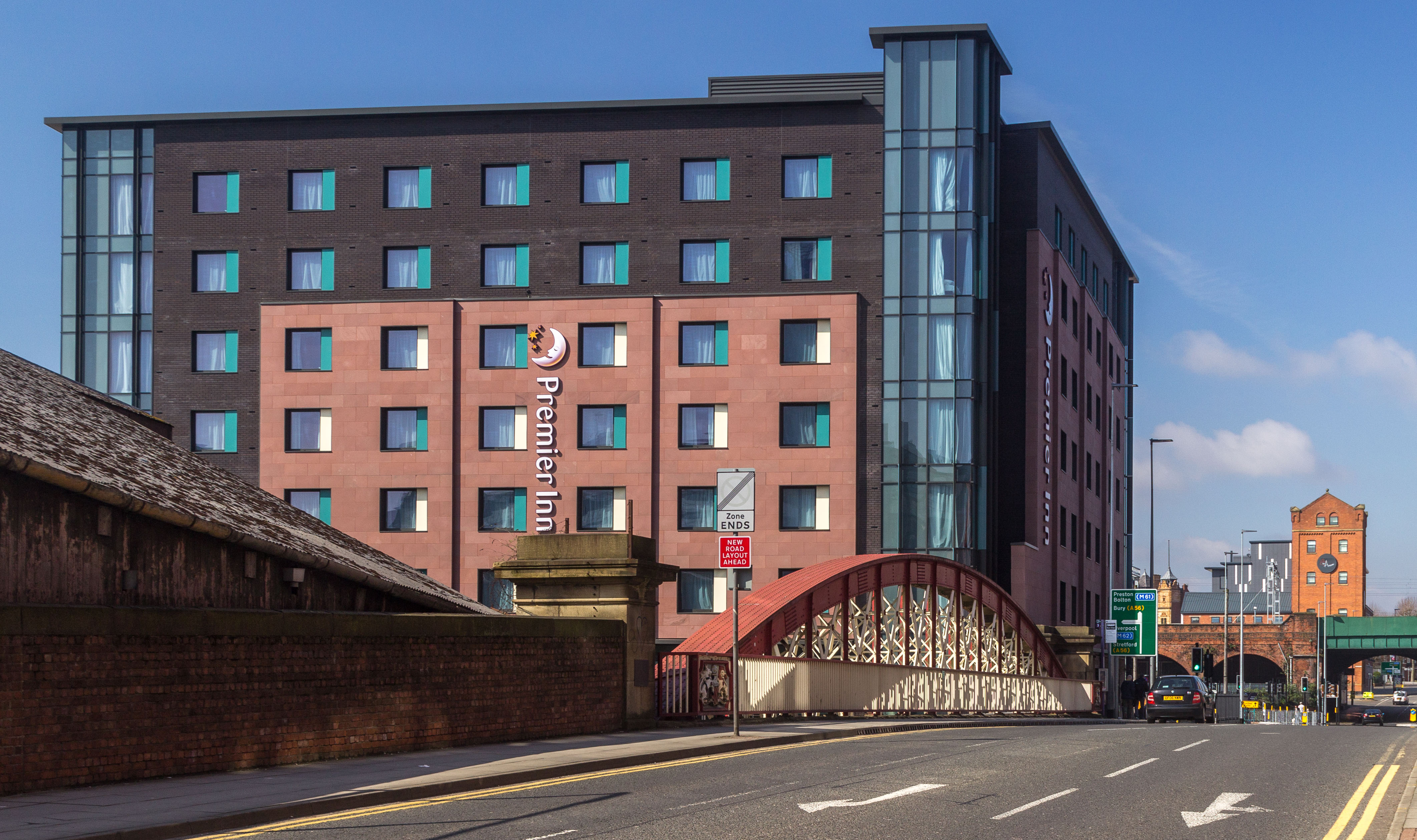
Premier Inn in Salford

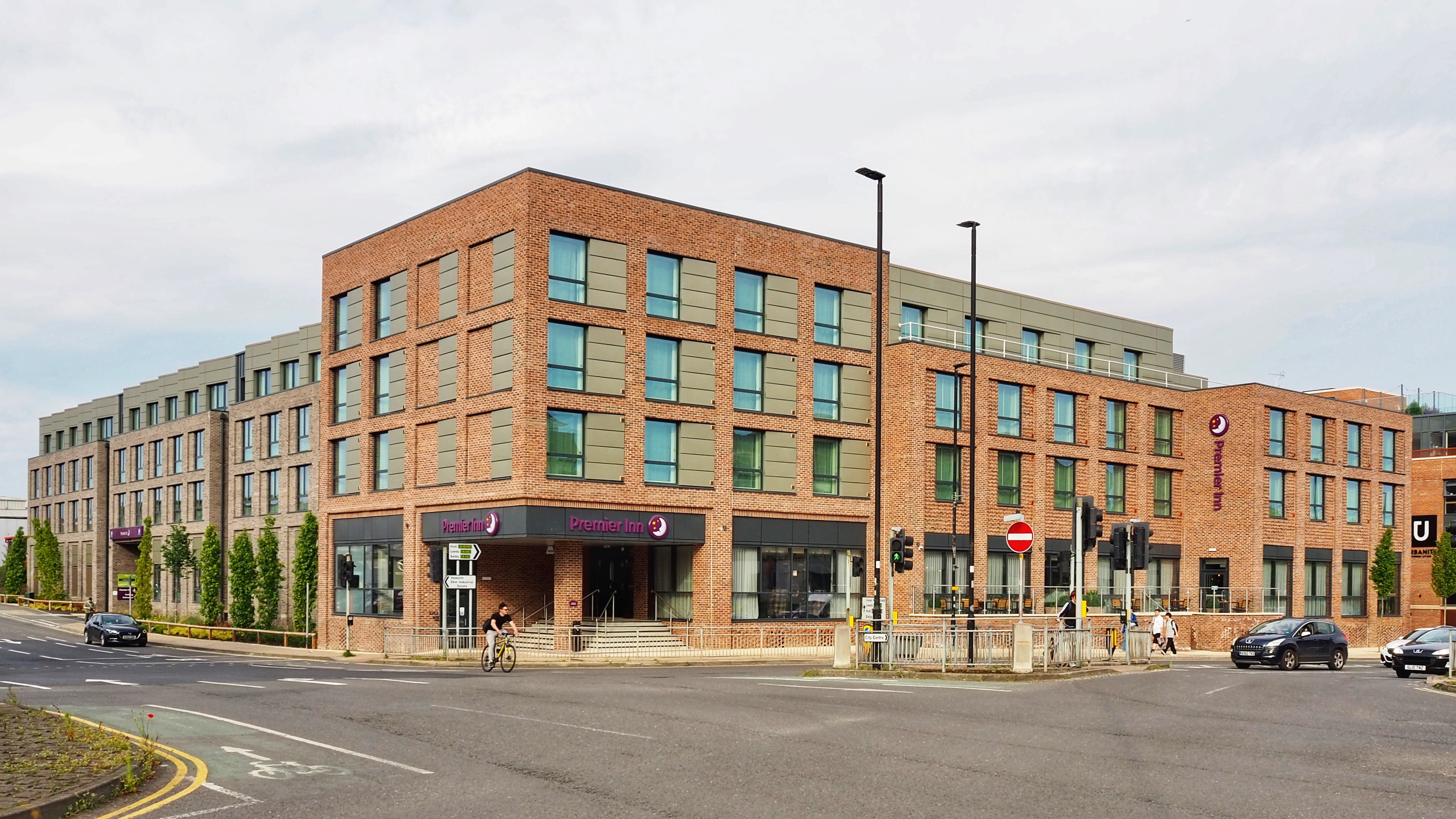
Premier Inn in York

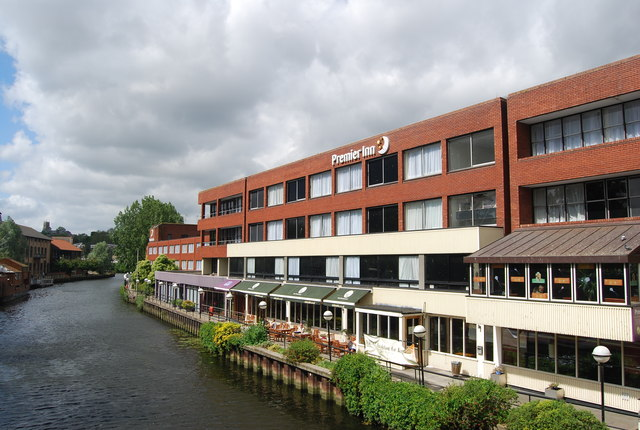
Premier Inn in Norwich

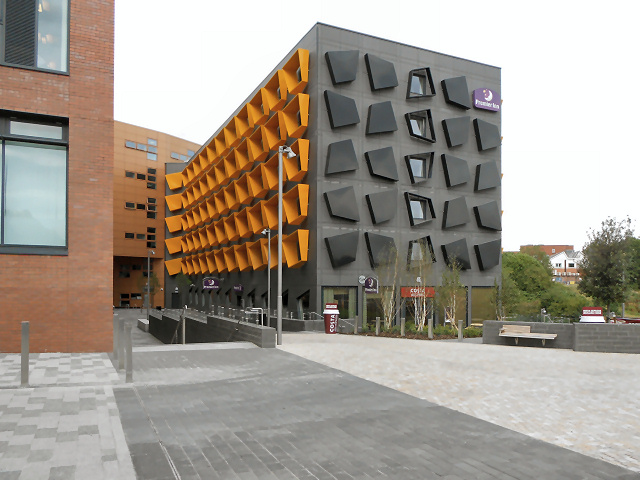
Premier Inn in Bury

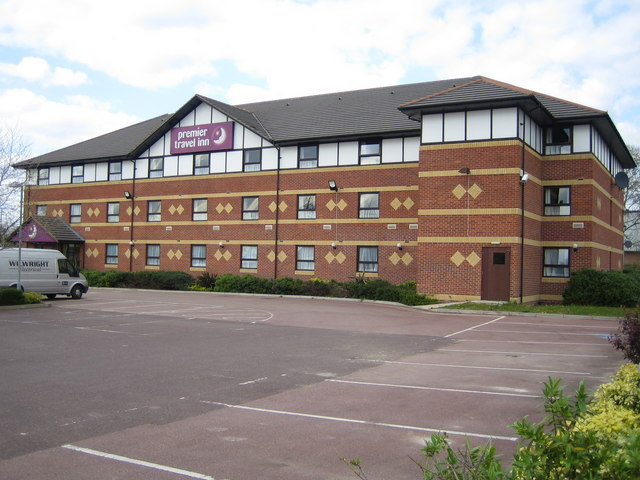
Premier Inn in Beckton, under the previous branding of Premier Travel Inn

== See also ==
- Helmont House
- North Tower (Salford)
