= Brewers Fayre =

British pub-restaurant chain

- Logo used from 2013 to 2019
- Traded as: Brewers Fayre; Brewsters
- Industry: Pub-restaurant chain
- Founded: 1981
- Defunct: 7 September 2026
- Owner: Whitbread

Brewers Fayre was a British chain of pub-restaurants, founded in 1981 by Whitbread and best known for being orientated towards families and serving a Sunday carvery.

Starting from one trial location in 1981, Brewers Fayre expanded to over 100 locations nationwide by the end of the 1980s. In 1992, Charlie Chalk Fun Factory soft play crèches were added in many of its locations, and in 1999, Whitbread launched the Brewsters spin-off, a pub chain focused towards young children's entertainment.

In April 2006, Whitbread began consolidating their Brewers Fayre estate, selling off standalone sites to favour those near its sister Premier Inn hotels. In the early 2020s, Whitbread began exploring sales of most of its Brewers Fayre business to focus on their Premier Inn business, and in April 2026, Whitbread announced a cull of all Brewers Fayre and Beefeater locations.

Whitbread closed the remaining 90 locations on 7 September 2026.

== History ==
=== Beginnings and national expansion (1981–2005) ===
In 1979, Vic and Jean Ellis purchased The Farmers Arms pub on the outskirts of Preston, Lancashire. Whitbread promised the couple they would fund a refurbishment if the pub made a profit, which it did a year later. In 1981, the pub was renamed to Brewers Fayre, which had been tweaked by Whitbread from Jean's initial suggestion of 'Brewery Fayre'. Within a month of the refurbishment, the pub was trading successfully and was reportedly attracting visitors from 30 miles away. By the end of the 1980s, Whitbread had expanded the Brewers Fayre chain as one of its flagship brands, with over 100 locations in the UK.

In 1992, Brewers Fayre began incorporating Charlie Chalk Fun Factory play crèches at its locations. In its 1994/1995 company accounts, Whitbread announced that it had added Charlie Chalk Fun Factories to 50 of the 224 Brewers Fayre locations. The chain had expanded to 381 locations by early 1999.

In 1999, Brewers Fayre announced the Brewsters spin-off, turning entire pubs into venues aimed at young families, replacing Charlie Chalk with Brewster the Bear, all featuring soft-play and activities. Whitbread reported in its 2000/1 accounts that there were 393 sites, 120 of them Brewsters.

In its 2004/05 accounts, Whitbread announced it would phase out its 144 Brewsters pubs, and rebrand all of its sites as Brewers Fayre, as the pubs lost trade due to focusing too heavily on young families. However, the soft play areas would remain. All Brewsters would be converted to Brewers Fayre by the end of 2005. Brewster the Bear would continue as the mascot of Brewers Fayre's soft play areas, before gradually being phased out.

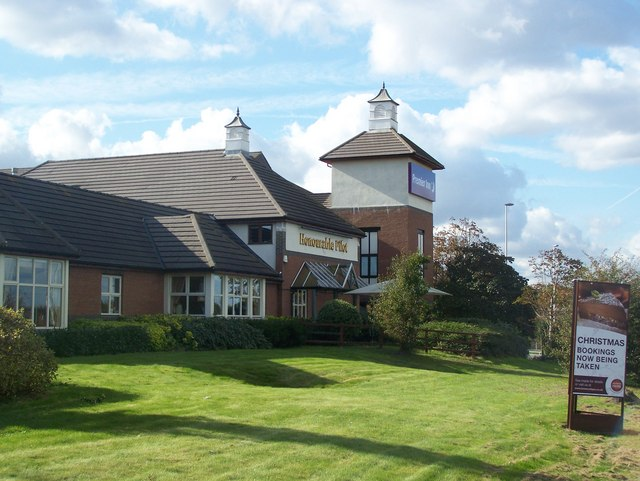
The Honourable Pilot at the A2/A289 junction in Kent

=== Whitbread consolidation (2006–2022) ===
In April 2006, Whitbread announced that they would sell most Brewers Fayre and Beefeater pubs that were not near their Premier Inn hotels. In June 2006, the number of pubs to be sold was set at 235, alongside four additional sites that had yet to begin trading. In July 2006, these 239 sites were sold to rival Mitchells & Butlers, with the former Beefeater sites being converted to Toby Carvery, and former Brewers Fayre sites being converted to Harvester and other brands. At the remaining standalone Brewers Fayres, Whitbread would construct Premier Inn hotels on disused land.

In July 2008, Whitbread engaged in an asset swap with Mitchells & Butlers, trading 44 Brewers Fayre and Beefeater pubs for 21 Holiday Inn hotels. These pubs had been refused planning permission for a Premier Inn, and Whitbread converted the Holiday Inns to Premier Inns.

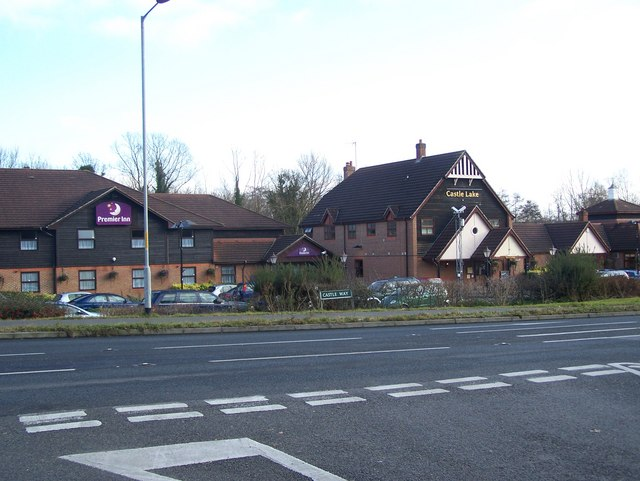
Castle Lake at Leybourne at the A228 junction 4 of the M20, near Leybourne Lakes Country Park

In January 2011, Brewers Fayre opened its first new-build site in five years: Malt & Myre, at Lomondgate Drive, Dumbarton. The second Brewers Fayre in Ireland opened in November 2012 as part of the Premier Inn at Crescent Link on the Waterside in Derry. Ireland's first Brewers Fayre had been The Harbour in Carrickfergus.

In 2015, Brewers Fayre launched a new themed children's menu featuring Dennis the Menace, alongside refurbishment to their play areas. The collaboration with Dennis the Menace began in 2013.

In March 2016, it was announced that Whitbread's Taybarns brand would be phased out, with the sites converted into Brewers Fayre. The first to be converted was Barnsley (The Wentworth) and the last site was South Shields, in September 2016.

In July 2022, the first new Brewers Fayre since 2017, The Willen Dragon in Milton Keynes, opened.

=== Disposals (2023–2026) ===
In May 2023, Whitbread announced that it was looking to sell around 250 of its 400 Beefeater and Brewers Fayre sites, due to losses and poor sales. Initially, it was thought all sites might be put up for sale. Greene King and other competitors were looking to acquire these sites.

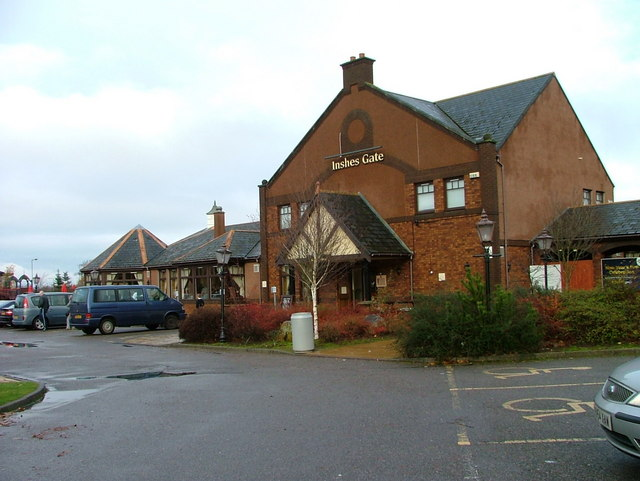
Inshes Gate, next to the A9 at Inverness

On 24 March 2024, Whitbread announced it had appointed Christie & Co to sell between 30 and 50 of its poorest-performing Beefeater and Brewers Fayre outlets to market rivals, such as Mitchells and Butlers and Greene King; most of these outlets were next to Premier Inn hotels. It was reported that a further 100 of these pubs and restaurants were expected to be converted into extra hotel rooms for Premier Inn locations. 126 under-performing Beefeater, Brewers Fayre, and Table Tables were put up for sale, which left the brand with 196 "better-performing" branded restaurants.

The closure process began in July 2024, starting with the de-branding of Beefeater and Brewers Fayre pubs into generic dining rooms to serve guests staying at the adjoining Premier Inn.

On 30 April 2026, Whitbread announced the closure of all 197 remaining Beefeater and Brewers Fayre restaurants. Those adjoining a Premier Inn would be converted to an "integrated food and beverage offer" alongside additional hotel rooms. As part of the programme to exit branded restaurants, market rival Mitchells & Butlers acquired a package of seven sites in June 2026. These included former Beefeater and Brewers Fayre restaurants, and it was announced the acquired sites would be converted into Miller & Carter and Toby Carvery restaurants.

In August 2026, it was announced that Queensway, a hospitality group, would acquire 53 Brewers Fayre and Beefeater sites. At the time of this announcement, Queensway did not confirm the new brand name, pricing or when the sites would reopen. It was later confirmed that these sites would reopen as Queensway Inns, and would be opened gradually.

Whitbread closed the remaining 90 locations on 7 September 2026. The dining area of some closed Brewers Fayre locations would continue, being used as the breakfast and dinner restaurant for Premier Inn guests.

In October 2026, it was announced that Common Table Group had acquired 57 former Brewers Fayre and Beefeater sites.
