= Taybarns =

British buffet restaurant chain

- Industry: Hospitality
- Founded: 2008
- Defunct: September 2016
- Area served: United Kingdom
- Products: Food and beverages
- Parent: Whitbread
- Website: Taybarns.com (now Brewers Fayre)

Taybarns was a British low cost all-you-can-eat restaurant chain owned by Whitbread, modelled on the Golden Corral chain in the United States. Customers paid on arrival and could eat as much food as they liked from a 34-metre-long food counter. As with most buffets, there was a lower price at lunchtime than evenings, and a slightly higher charge was levied at weekends and during bank holidays.

In March 2016, it was announced that following a strategic corporate review, all Taybarns Restaurants would close and convert to pub restaurants of Brewers Fayre. When the South Shields Taybarns closed on 13 September 2016, the business became defunct.

== Locations ==
The seven Taybarns restaurants were in Barnsley, Coventry, Newcastle-under-Lyme, Gateshead, South Shields, Swansea, and Wigan.

In October 2009, the company made public its intention to expand rapidly, as did Fos, with CEO Martin Howe stating that some Brewers Fayre pubs would be converted to the Taybarns brand and up to thirty new restaurants to open the following year. However, the company was unable to open new restaurants, due to the high costs of such extensive refurbishments and in 2016, it was announced that all seven sites would be returned to the Brewers Fayre brand.
