= Mitchells & Butlers =

UK pub, bar and restaurant company

Mitchells & Butlers plc
- Type: Public
- Traded as: LSE: MAB; FTSE 250 component
- Industry: Restaurants, Pubs
- Founded: 1898; 128 years ago
- Headquarters: Birmingham, England, UK
- Area served: United Kingdom; Germany
- Key people: Bob Ivell (chairman); Phil Urban (CEO)
- Products: c. 1784 restaurants and pubs
- Revenue: ▲£2,711 million (2025)
- Operating income: ▲£330 million (2025)
- Net income: ▲£177 million (2025)
- Number of employees: 50,559 (2025)
- Subsidiaries: All Bar One; Browns Restaurants; Harvester; Innkeeper's Lodge; Miller & Carter; Toby Carvery
- Website: mbplc.com

Mitchells & Butlers plc (also referred to as "M&B") operates pubs, bars and restaurants in the United Kingdom. The company's headquarters are in Birmingham, England. The company is listed on the London Stock Exchange (LSE) and is a constituent of the FTSE 250 Index.

Its branded restaurants and bars include All Bar One, Miller & Carter, Nicholson's, Toby Carvery, Harvester, Browns Restaurants, Vintage Inns, Ember Inns, Son of Steak, Stonehouse Pizza & Grill, Crown Carveries, O'Neill's, Premium Country Pubs, and Sizzling Pubs. The company also owns the ALEX brand based in Germany.

== History ==
=== Historic brewing company ===
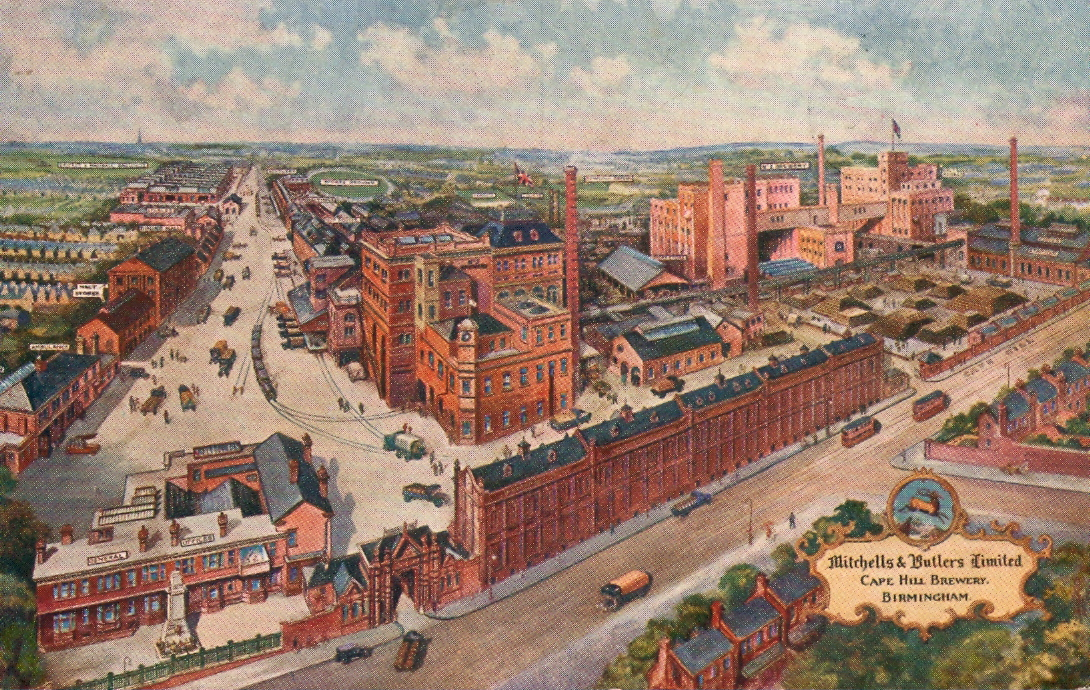
The Cape Hill Brewery, in Birmingham, on a circa 1925 postcard

Mitchells & Butlers Brewery was formed by the merger of two breweries in 1898. The company merged with Bass in 1961. With the brand currently under ownership of Coors Brewers, the brewery closed in 2002 with production switched to Burton upon Trent. Their most famous beer was Brew XI (using Roman numerals, and so pronounced Brew Eleven), advertised with the slogan "for the men of the Midlands". It is now brewed under licence for Coors by Brains of Cardiff.

=== Bass ===
Bass plc, based in Burton-on-Trent, transformed into separate brewing and retail divisions following the Beer Orders of 1989 and then built a large hotel portfolio alongside its bingo, betting and electronic leisure interests. On 21 July 1995, Bass bought 78 Harvester restaurants for £165 million from the Forte Group.

=== Six Continents ===
In 2000, Bass also divested its brewing arm and rebranded itself Six Continents before another split in April 2003 into two separate companies, with the hotel assets forming InterContinental Hotels Group and the Mitchells & Butlers name brought back for the pubs and restaurants company. In March 2003, Six Continents fought off a proposed £5.5 billion takeover by Hugh Osmond (Punch Taverns).

=== Mitchells & Butlers ===
Mitchells & Butlers was formed on 15 April 2003. In April 2006, it was approached by a consortium led by Robert Tchenguiz in a £2.7 billion takeover, which was dropped in May 2006. In February 2008, Punch Taverns offered to merge with Mitchells & Butlers, but decided not to in April 2008. Mitchells & Butlers then took an interest in Punch's subsidiary, Spirit Group.

=== Financial loss ===
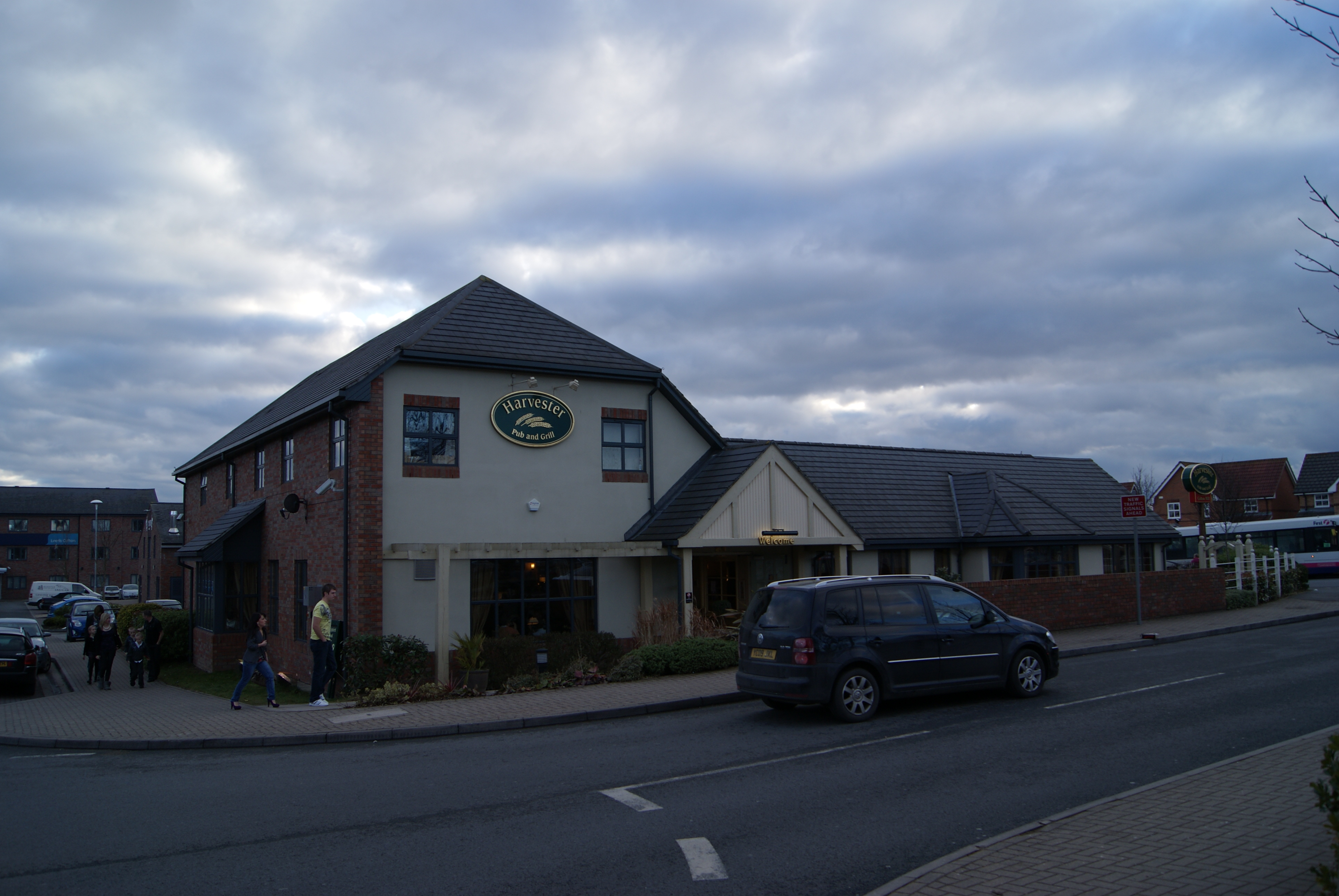
A Harvester pub with adjacent Travelodge in Colton, Leeds

In January 2008, Mitchells & Butlers announced significant losses (£274 million) arising out of closure of hedge positions taken in anticipation of a property joint venture that were eventually cancelled due to the credit crunch caused by the subprime mortgage financial crisis.

=== Acquisitions ===
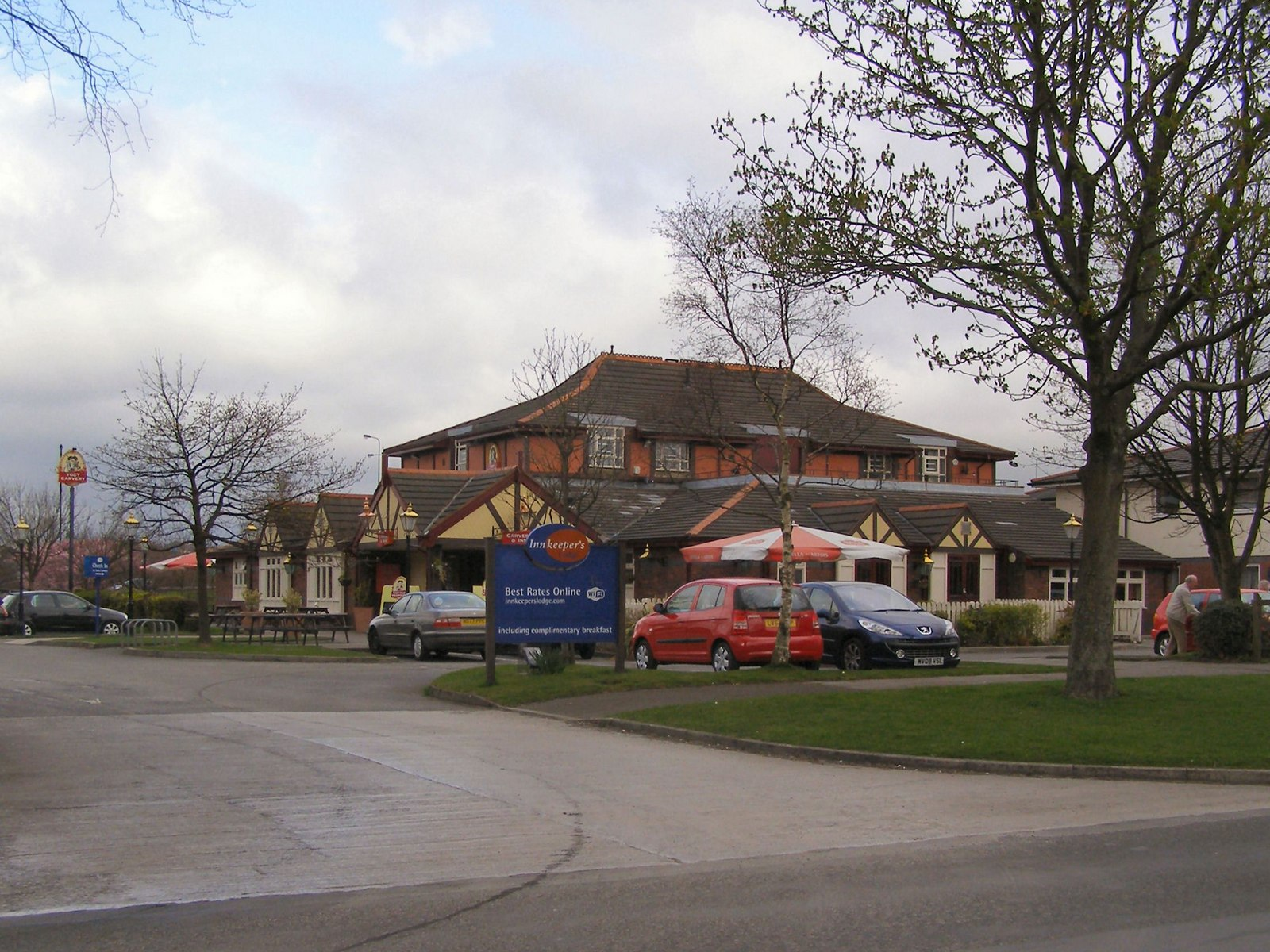
Innkeeper's Lodge in Chadderton, Greater Manchester in 2010

By 2006, Mitchells & Butlers operated 130 Harvester restaurants. In 2001, it added Arena, Ember Inns, Flares, Goose, Sizzling Pub Co, Browns, Alex (in Germany), and Inn Keeper's Lodge to its list of brands. In July 2006, Mitchells & Butlers purchased 239 pub restaurants (Beefeater and Brewers Fayre without a Premier Inn) from Whitbread for £497 million to strengthen its food business ahead of the introduction of a smoking ban in enclosed public spaces in England in 2007. It had first announced its interest in April 2006. In July 2008, Mitchells & Butlers bought 44 more former Brewers Fayre and Beefeater outlets from Whitbread in exchange for 21 Holiday Inn hotels. The acquired sites were rebranded into flagship brands Harvester and Toby Carvery. In September 2010, Mitchells & Butlers bought the 22 restaurants of the (upmarket) Ha Ha! chain from the Bay Restaurant Group for £19.5 million. Twelve were turned into All Bar One and six into Browns Restaurants. The Ha Ha! brand disappeared.

In June 2014, the company announced plans to acquire the bulk of one of its major competitors, Orchid Group, for £266 million. The acquisition included 173 pubs.

In June 2026, the company agreed to acquire a seven-site package from Whitbread, comprising former Beefeater and Brewers Fayre restaurants alongside several Premier Inn properties (following Whitbread's announcement to exit branded restaurants to focus on Premier Inn). The acquired restaurant sites are expected to be converted into Miller & Carter and Toby Carvery restaurants.

=== Sale of pubs ===
In October 2006, Mitchells & Butlers sold off 102 of its smaller community pubs to Chorley-based Trust Inns for £101 million. On 15 July 2010, it was announced that Travelodge had acquired the leases of 52 Innkeeper's Lodge Hotels around Glasgow, Birmingham, Liverpool, Northampton, Milton Keynes and Leeds areas from Mitchells & Butlers. It also sold 12 Hollywood Bowl outlets in August 2010 for £39 million to AMF Bowling and 13 to Tenpin. In November 2010, Mitchells & Butlers sold 333 pubs to the Stonegate Pub Company (of London and owned by TDR Capital) or £373 million.

=== Poor results and dismissal of CEO ===
In September 2015, Mitchells & Butlers issued a profits warning and dismissed CEO Alistair Darby. He was replaced by Phil Urban, who joined as COO in January from Grosvenor Casinos and previously ran Whitbread's pub restaurants division.

== Operations ==
Mitchells & Butlers owns several brands of pubs, including:

- Alex
- All Bar One
- Browns Restaurants
- Castle
- Crown Carveries
- Ego Mediterranean
- Ember Inns
- Harvester
- Innkeeper's Lodge
- Oak Tree
- Orchid Pubs
- Premium Country Pubs (formerly Premium Country Dining Group)
- Miller and Carter
- Nicholson's
- O'Neill's
- Sizzling Pubs
- Stonehouse Pizza & Carvery
- Toby Carvery
- Vintage Inns

Nicholson's pubs tend to be historic pubs aimed at the tourist market, located in London and other historic cities. Amongst Mitchells & Butlers' portfolio is Ye Olde Fighting Cocks, a St Albans public house that was previously listed by the Guinness Book of Records as being the United Kingdom's oldest.
