= Toby Carvery =

British carvery chain

- Logo used since 2014

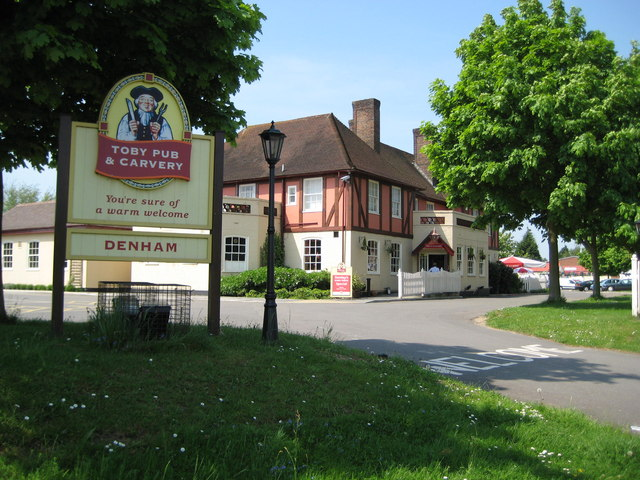
- A Toby Carvery branch in Denham, Buckinghamshire
- Formerly: Toby Pub & Carvery; Toby Inns
- Type: Subsidiary
- Industry: Hospitality
- Founded: 1985
- Founder: Michael Sabrin
- Number of locations: 158
- Area served: United Kingdom
- Products: Carvery; British cuisine Full English breakfast Sandwiches; Beverages; Functions
- Number of employees: 4,500
- Parent: Mitchells & Butlers
- Website: tobycarvery.co.uk

Toby Carvery is a British carvery chain brand owned and operated by Mitchells & Butlers, which consists of 158 restaurants.

== History ==
=== Establishment in Essex ===
The first Toby Carvery was in Brentwood, at The Artichoke Pub around 1978 or 1979. This was the brainchild of the Manager, Nevio Tedaldi, and Charrington's District Sales Manager, Kevin Garvey.

By 1982, multiple sites had opened around Essex and North London. Decor was described as 'mock-Tudor'. In the early 1980s it was known as 'Mr T's C' or 'Mr T's Carving Room'. Michael Sabin was the catering director, and the company was known then as Toby Inns. Toby Carvery as a brand was founded as part of Bass Charrington in 1985.

=== Increase in pub-restaurant competition ===
By the mid-1990s there were many more pub-restaurants to directly compete with. Not all Toby Carvery restaurants had a self-serve Toby Carvery section, with the Forest Gate (named after Charnwood Forest) in Loughborough adding a carvery in November 1996, at a cost of £200,000. The company headquarters was Hagley House in the west of Birmingham.

=== New decor ===
The former decor and livery was introduced around July 1997, with one of the first to adopt this decor being the Walsgrave in Coventry. The look would become more widely adopted in 1998, but many sites retained the former livery and insignia until each site was revamped, sometimes at great costs (£500,000 at 1998 prices). Many sites would require a revamp anyway by the late 1990s, regardless of any new insignia. By the end of 1998, the new corporate insignia was now used more frequently on company documentation and literature. The new revamps in the late 1990s were often met with negative feedback from local council planning committees, as the interior design would feature a salmon-pink colour scheme. Some council planning departments found the vibrant, bold new colour scheme to be somewhat too flashy. Later in the early 2010s the restaurants were painted red and black and then in the 2020s the painted them light and dark grey.

After the 90s/00s revamps, the previous name of the pub was dropped. Some local residents expressed reservations about the colour scheme, describing one pub, which formally opened at 5pm on 8 March 1999, on Church Road in Formby, as resembling "a Blackpool Golden Mile-style cafe," "a misguided Moulin Rouge," "a garish eyesore reminiscent of the worst of Disney," and "a plastic Barbie land."

Towards the end of the 1990s, the pub restaurant industry in the UK experienced a revival, even a surge in popularity. By 1999, the company was under the management of Bass Leisure Retail.

The parent company subsequently rebranded as Six Continents plc, before the former Bass pub estate was spun off into Mitchells & Butlers. The chain was previously known as "Toby Pub and Carvery", but it was rebranded, removing the pub part of the name.

By 2005 outlets were averaging £30,000 a week, serving 12 million customers a year in total. From 2005 to 2009 outlets increased from 80 to 133, by converting former Beefeater sites of Whitbread.

A small sandwich chain was established, Toby Carvery Sandwich Express, with sites in Cardiff and Southampton.

=== Conversion into other restaurants ===
By 2017 there were 180 establishments; many establishments would be converted into other venue types. The Son of Steak and Stonehouse Pub and Carvery venues were also introduced by M&B at this time.

In 2018 a report by Action on Sugar, a research group at Queen Mary University of London, found that it served the most-sugary drink in the UK, the Unicorn Freakshake, with 39 spoonfuls of sugar, being 1,280 calories.

During the pandemic from July 2020, food was brought to tables only, with no self-service available.

=== Menu options ===
In 1991, the main carvery was £7.99. Vegetarians had Cheesy Leek and Potato Bake, and Savoury Broccoli and Brie, with approval from the Vegetarian Society.

By 1996, a carvery was £6.95. By late 1998, the price of the main carvery meal had been reduced to £5.95, and desserts were served with the Toby Bottomless Custard Jug.

In February 2018, the chain introduced a dedicated vegetarian and vegan menu.

== Documentaries ==
On Sunday April 10 2022 Channel 5 broadcast 'Toby Carvery: How Do They Do It', repeated on Sunday January 15 2023 and Sunday August 27 2023.

On Friday April 19 2024 Channel 5 broadcast 'Wetherspoons vs Toby Carvery: Which Is Better', looking at the breakfasts, lunch and dinner, and the drinks, at the Darlington establishment.

== Leadership ==
It operates under a division of M&B with Stonehouse Carveries and Harvester. In 2018, the division director, 43 year old Rob Pitcher, became the Chief of Revolution Bars.

== Incidents ==
- At the Bromley establishment on December 8 2014, a Babestation model had visited for her 21st birthday, with her mother and 76 year old grandmother. After the 21 year old customer had complained to staff that her plate was dirty, a waitress, who had recognised her, shouted at her 'at least I don't get my tits out on TV'. There was a verbal altercation, and the manager phoned 999 for the police, who arrived. The customer's grandmother did not know that her granddaughter was a Babestation model. Toby Carvery subsequently agreed not to charge for the customer's bill.
- Toby Carvery tree felling in April 2025
