= North Tower (Salford) =

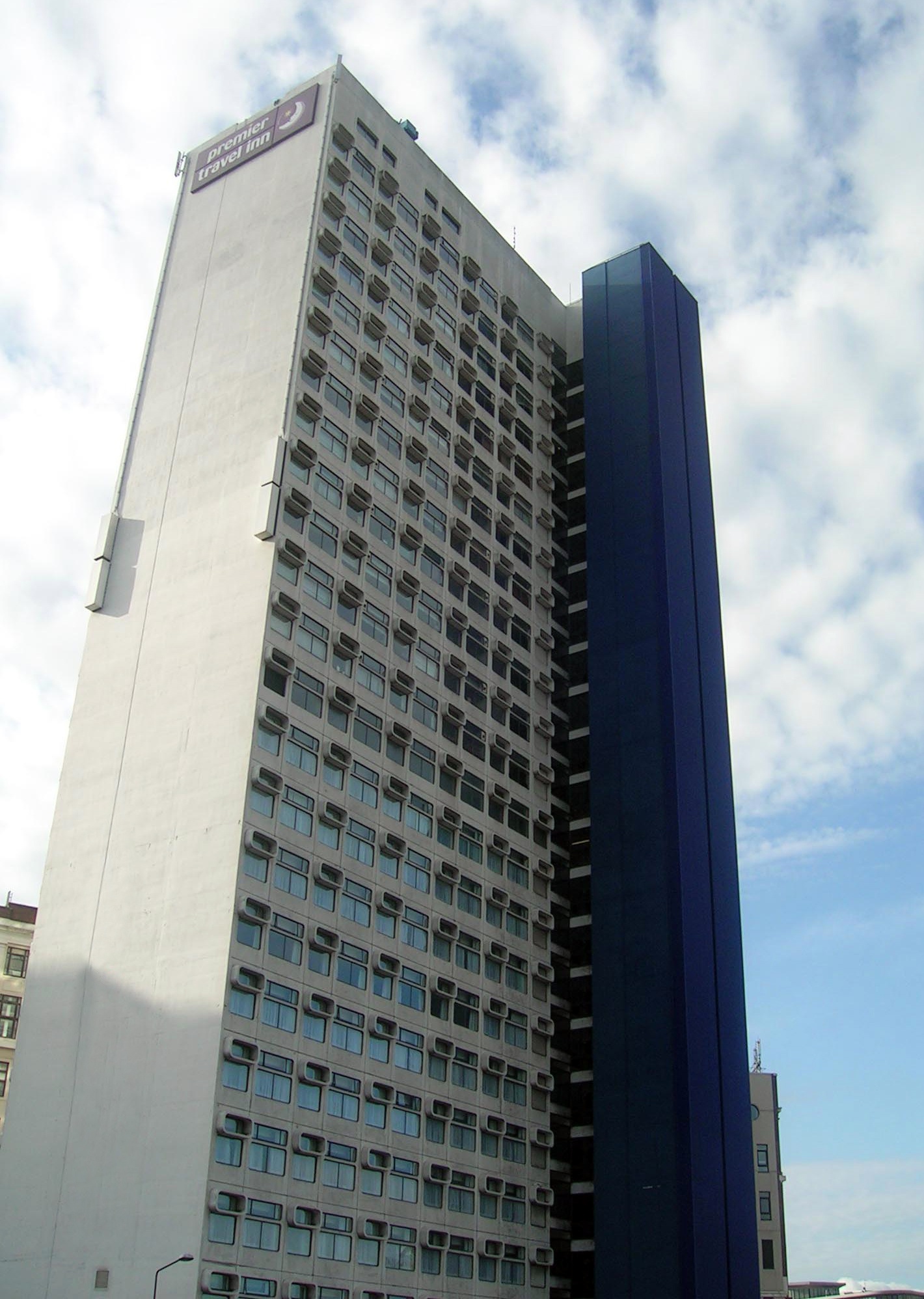
- Interactive map of the North Tower area
- Former names: Highland House

General information
- Type: High-rise residential and hotel
- Location: Salford, close to Manchester city centre
- Coordinates: 53.4851°N 2.2465°W
- Completed: 1966; 60 years ago

Height
- Height: 80 m (260 ft)

Technical details
- Floor count: 23
- Floor area: 14,000 m^{2} (150,000 sq ft)

Design and construction
- Architects: Leach, Rhodes, & Walker

North Tower (formerly Highland House) is a high-rise residential building on Victoria Bridge Street in Salford, England. The building is 23 storeys tall with a podium at the base, which gives it a total height of 80 m (260 ft), making it one of the tallest buildings in Salford. The building is in the City of Salford, just north of the River Irwell and less than 100 m (330 ft) from Manchester Cathedral on the other side of the river. The top 12 floors contain 96 apartments, with the lower 10 used as a Premier Inn hotel.

== History ==
The building was designed and built by Leach, Rhodes & Walker (now Leach Rhodes Walker) for the Inland Revenue, and was completed in 1966. This was not LRW's only work for the Inland Revenue; they also constructed Aldine House in 1967, as well as Trinity Bridge House in 1998.

The tower was built using the (then) innovative technique of using a continuously climbing shutter to cast a central core; pre-fabricated cladding was then lifted into place using a tower crane. This technique led to rapid construction, avoided the need for scaffolding, and allowed the lower floors to be occupied while building continued higher up. The combination was very cost-effective, but was not flawless by any means. On a windy night the windows of the building blew off, ending up in the nearby bus station.

== Ownership ==
It changed hands in 1994 for £7.7 million. The Inland Revenue announced plans to move out in 1995 in an early example of a Private Finance Initiative, described as the most complex to date, and shortly afterwards the building was sold by London & Regional Properties to the Bruntwood group. Between 1998 and 2000 the building was reclad, converted to its current use and renamed, at a total cost of £4.5 million. In 2004, the president of the Royal Institute of British Architects, George Ferguson, said that the building (along with the Arndale Centre) was "dreadful" and should be demolished.
