= O'Neill's (pub chain) =

UK Irish-themed pub chain

- Type: Subsidiary
- Industry: Hospitality
- Founded: 1994 (Aberdeen)
- Founder: Bass Brewery
- Headquarters: Birmingham, England, UK
- Area served: Great Britain
- Products: Irish-themed pubs
- Parent: Mitchells & Butlers
- Website: oneills.co.uk

O'Neill's is an Irish-themed pub chain with 52 outlets in Great Britain. The chain is operated by Mitchells & Butlers, one of the largest pub companies in the United Kingdom. O'Neill's pubs are located in Great Britain only: the chain have no pubs in Northern Ireland, the only part of the UK where the O'Neill's chain does not operate.

The chain's focus is on Irish music, an Irish inspired food menu and Irish drinks such as Guinness, Jameson and Baileys.

== History ==
The first O'Neill's was opened in Aberdeen in 1994 by Bass, the largest pub company in the UK at the time. A second O'Neill's opened at Covent Garden in 1995. By 1996, there were 52 and it was Bass's most successful pub chain. By 1996, Bass was opening more than one a month, and had spent £40 million on the pub chain. Ten opened in September 1996 alone. Bass owned Caffrey's ale, which was launched by the company around the same time as O'Neill's. By late 1996, Bass was opening a branch of O'Neill's every week.

By the end of 1997, Bass had over 250 Irish-themed pubs. Bass acquired the 40-strong Scruffy Murphy's Irish pub chain from Allied Domecq in 1999.

By June 2003, Mitchells and Butlers had 91 O'Neill's.

From 2012, M&B began to rebrand some locations as "O'Neill's Irish Pub & Kitchen". By 2013, the chain's estate had reduced to 49 public houses.

== Operation ==
The pubs specialise in Irish music, food and drinks, especially Guinness, Smithwick's (for which it has exclusive rights in Great Britain), and, until early 2013, Caffrey's Irish Ale. On St. Patrick's Day, they sell over 71,000 pints of Guinness.

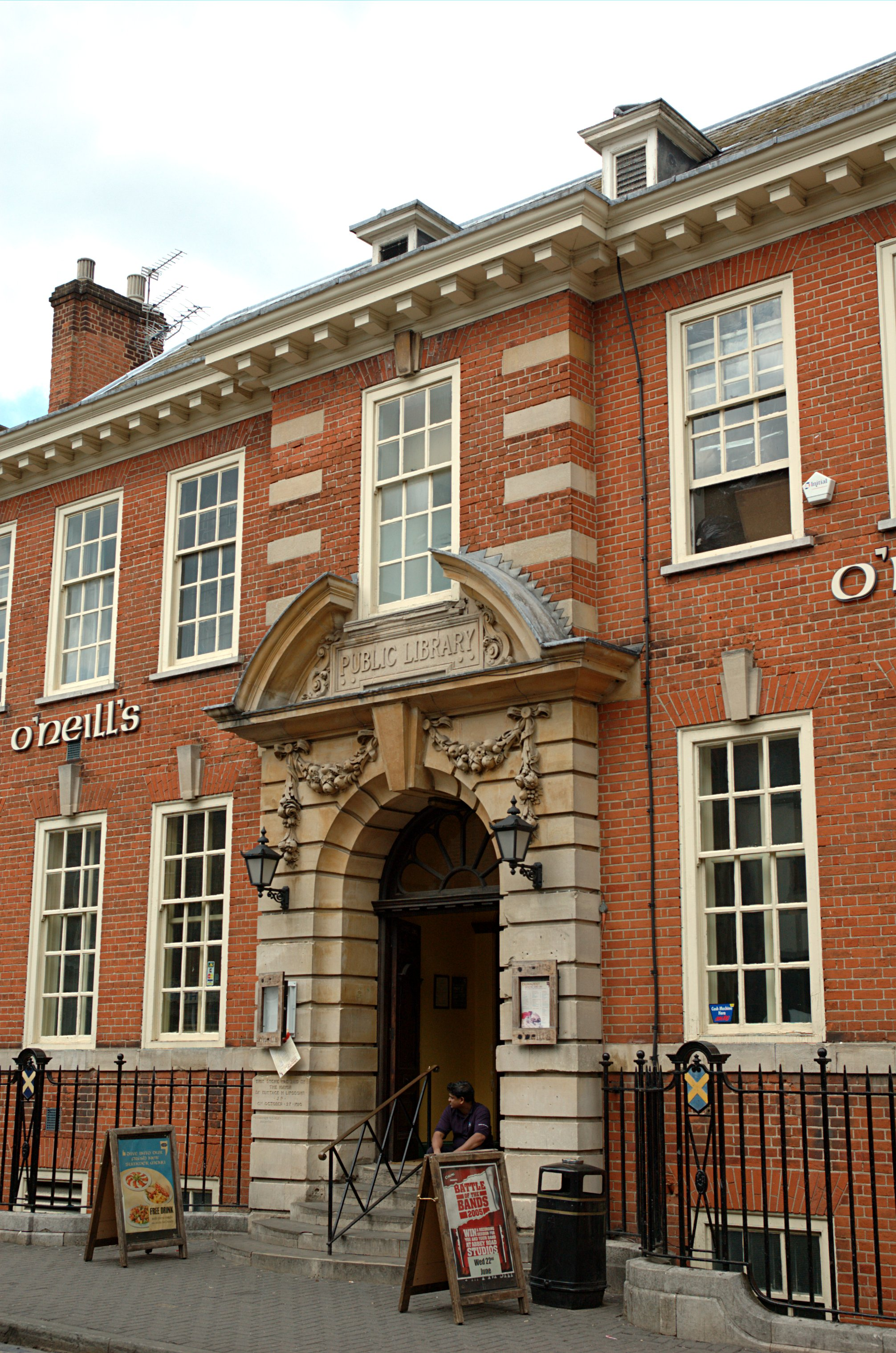
O'Neils-St.Albans

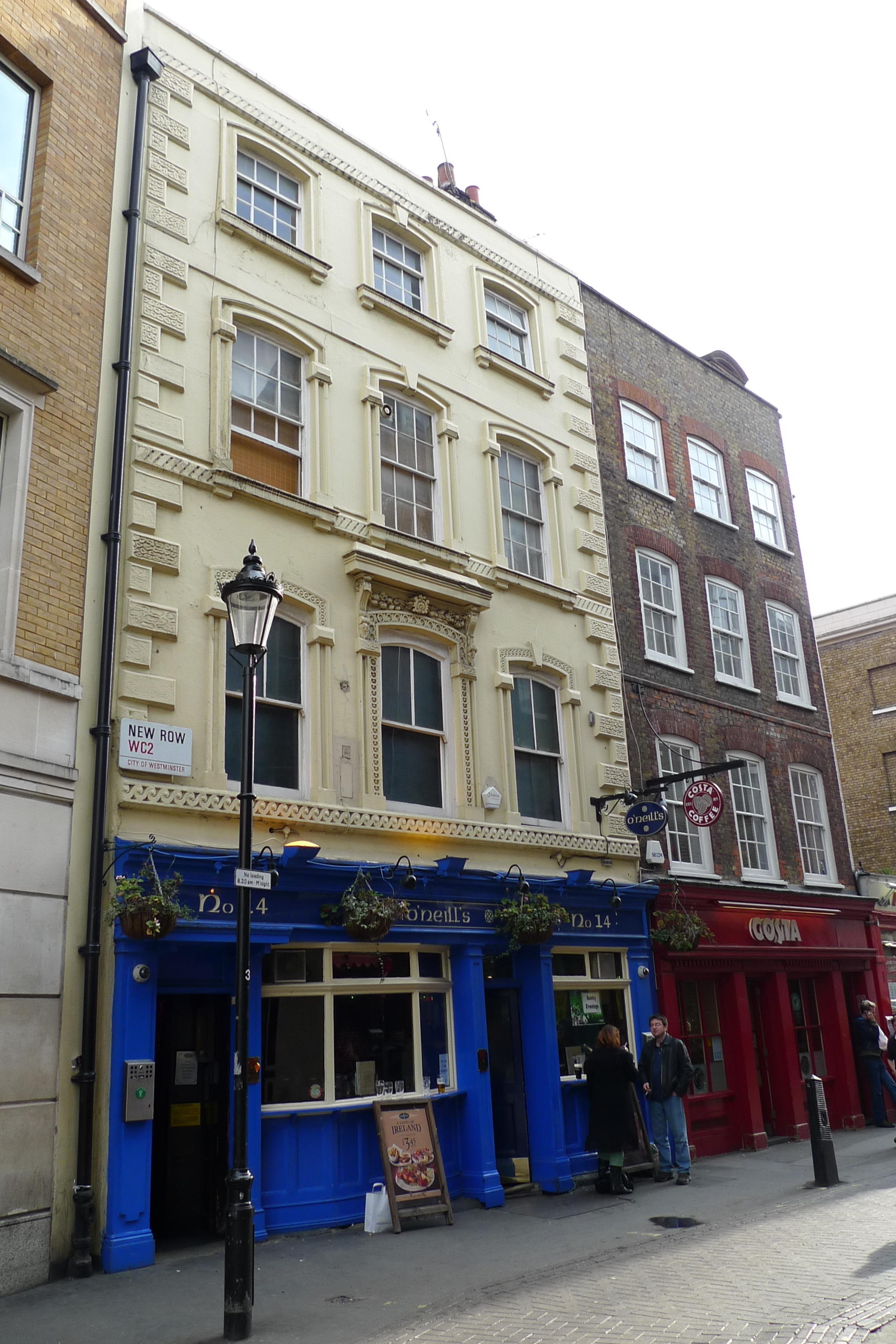
O'Neill's Covent Garden

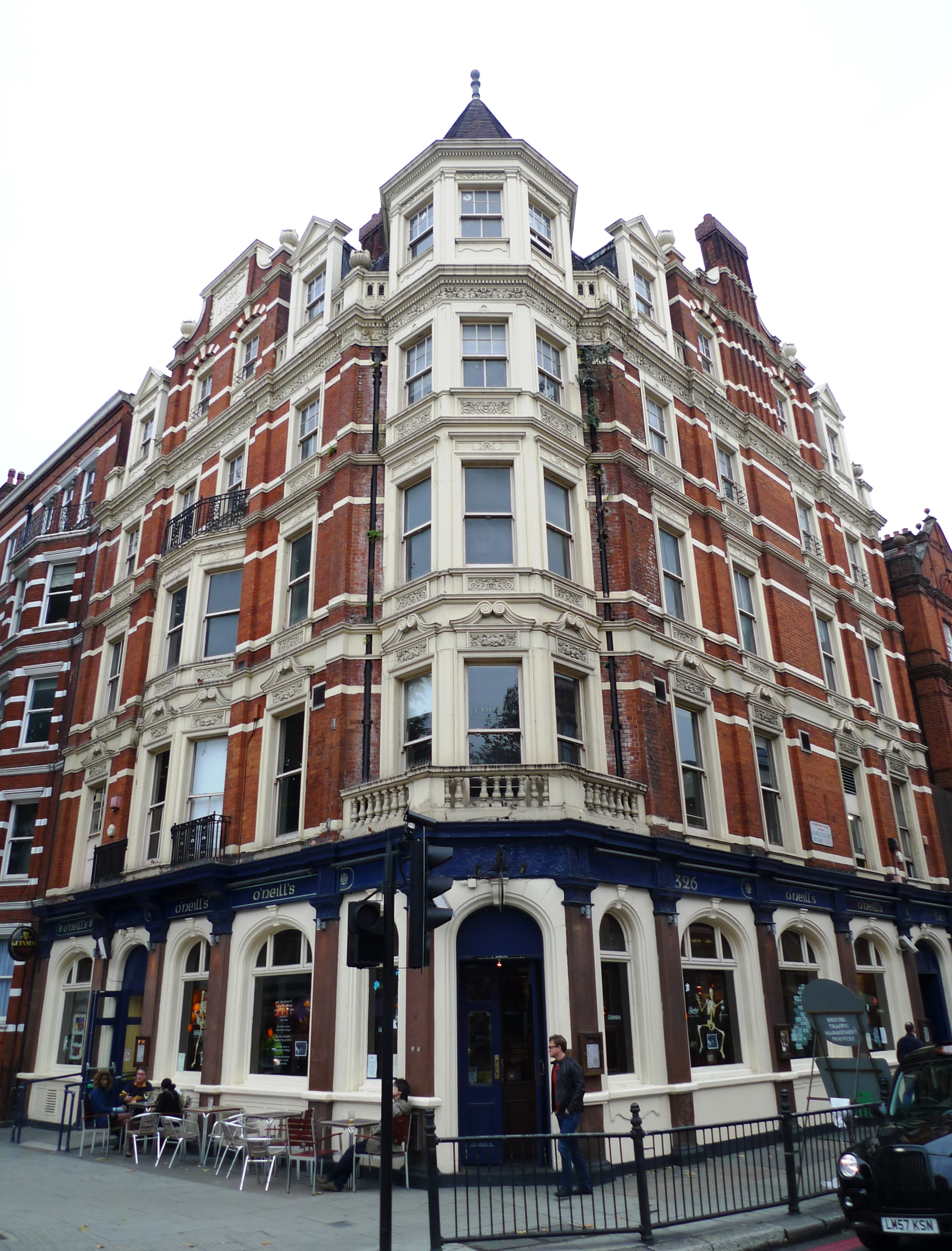
O'Neill's Earls Court

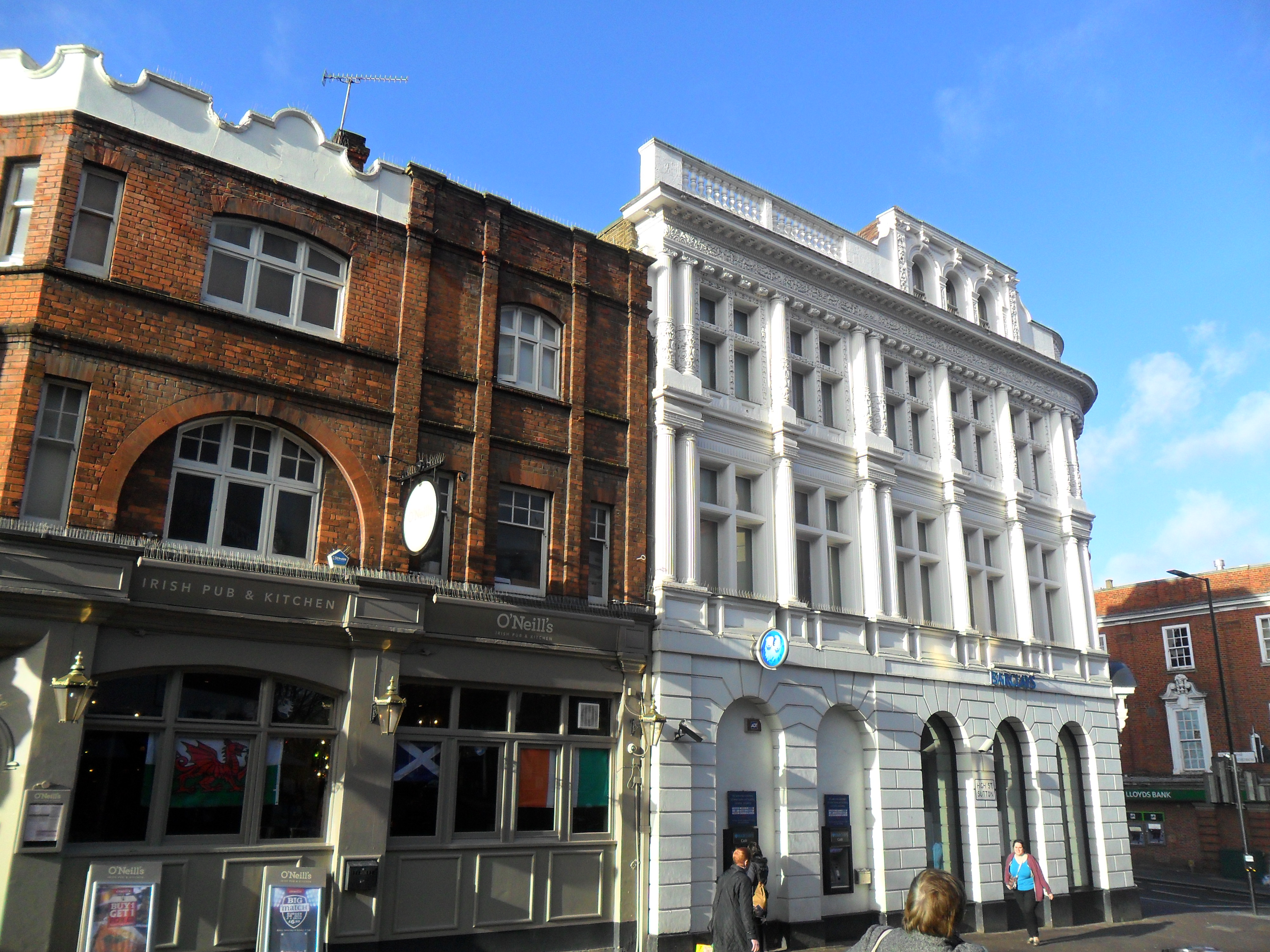
O'Neill's in Sutton, London

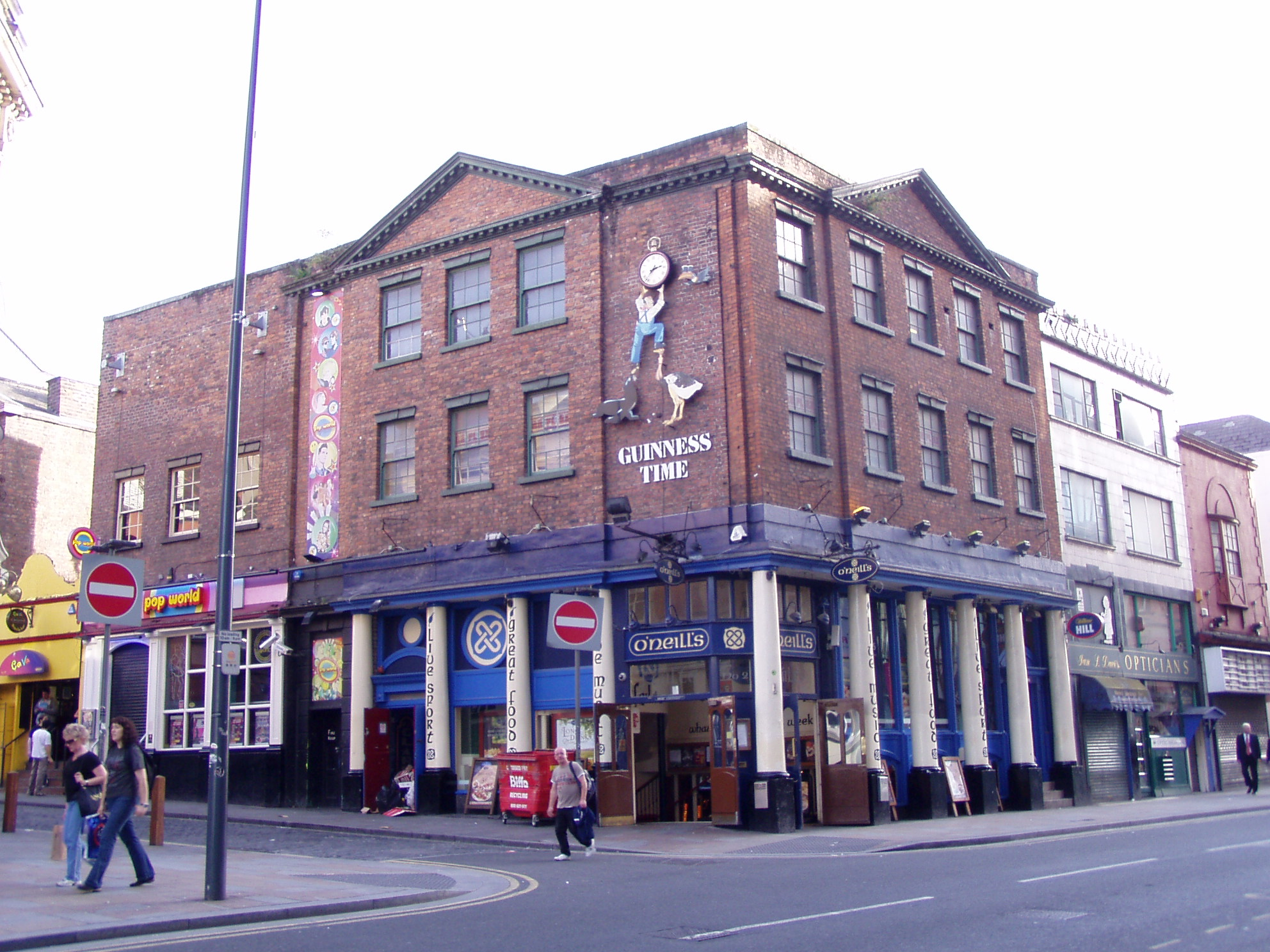
O'Neill's on Hannover Street in Liverpool

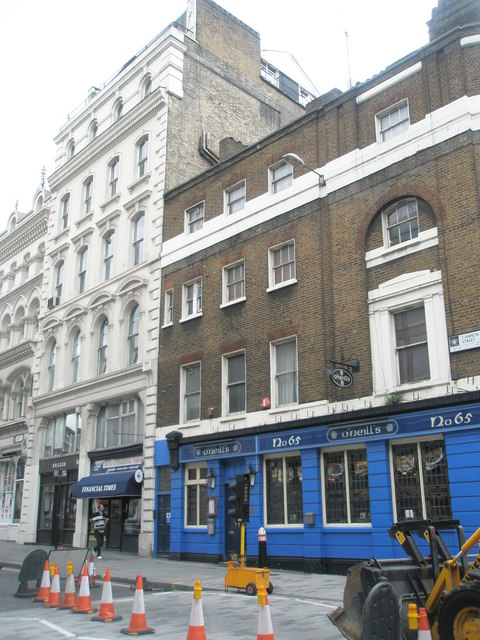
O'Neill's on Cannon Street in the City of London

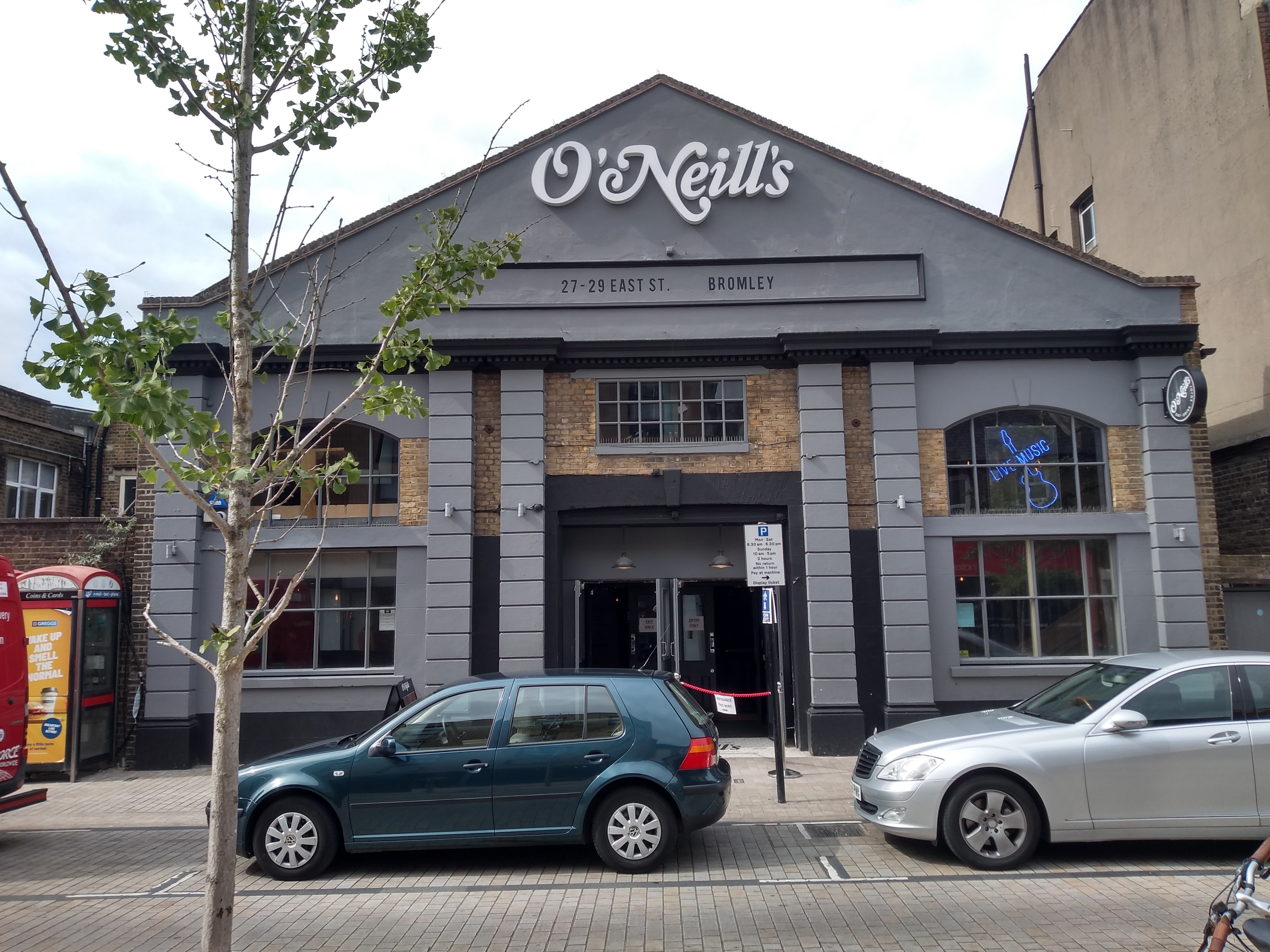
O'Neill's in Bromley

== See also ==
- List of Irish restaurants
