= Beefeater (restaurant) =

British pub-restaurant chain

- Logo used from 2015 to 2020.
- Type: Subsidiary
- Founded: 1974
- Defunct: 10 September 2026
- Headquarters: Dunstable
- Owner: Whitbread
- Website: beefeater.co.uk

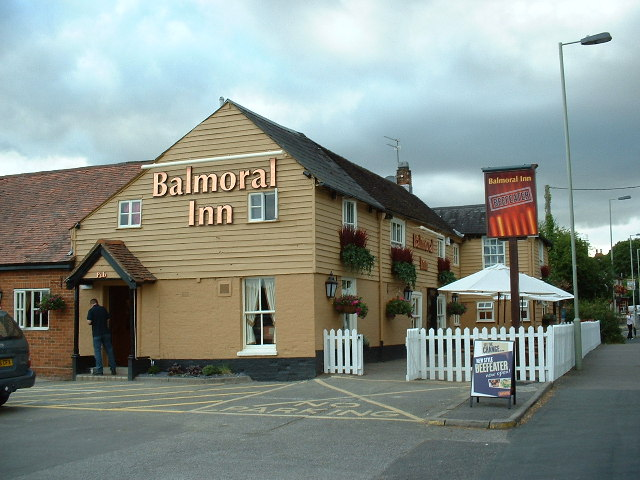
Beefeater, Balmoral Inn, Southampton

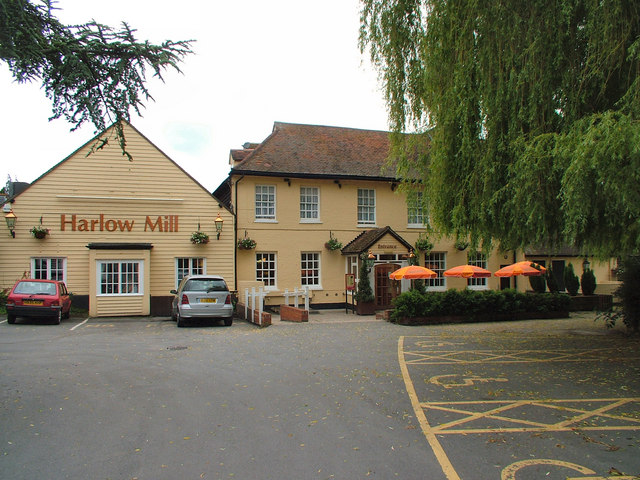
Harlow Mill Beefeater, Harlow

Beefeater was a British pub-restaurant chain, founded by Whitbread in 1974.

The chain expanded significantly in 1995 when Whitbread acquired and rebranded the rival Berni Inn chain to Beefeater, which had 115 locations. As a result, Beefeater would have over 250 locations by the late 1990s; becoming Whitbread's flagship restaurant brand, alongside Brewers Fayre.

In April 2026, Whitbread announced the closure of all Beefeater and Brewers Fayre restaurants. The chain was closed down on 10 September 2026.

== History ==
=== Beginnings and national expansion (1974–2005) ===
Beefeater was set up by the then Whitbread Brewery in 1974 with the opening of its first restaurant, The Halfway House, in Enfield. The premise was for simple food, such as prawn cocktails and char-grilled steaks. In 1995, Whitbread acquired the Berni Inn chain, rebranding all Berni Inn sites to Beefeater.

In its 1998/9 accounts, Whitbread confirmed there were 256 Beefeater outlets.

In August 1999, celebrity chef Brian Turner was recruited to advise on the remaining Beefeaters, and his signature dishes and face were featured on the menu.

=== Whitbread consolidation (2006–2023) ===
In 2006, Whitbread divested the majority of its standalone Beefeater and Brewers Fayre sites (excluding those with a Premier Inn) to market rival Mitchells & Butlers, who would rebrand the locations.

In 2008, Whitbread opened a Beefeater in Llanelli, the first new site to open in the 2000s. In the same year, Whitbread would rebrand various Brewers Fayre locations as Beefeater.

In July 2008, Mitchells & Butlers acquired 44 additional standalone Beefeater and Brewers Fayre pubs, such as the Park Place in Mitcham, in exchange for 21 Express by Holiday Inn hotels.

In February 2016, Beefeater opened a new restaurant concept in Birmingham, titled "Bar + Block," bringing Beefeater to the high street locations.

=== Disposals (2024–2026) ===
In April 2024, it was announced that 112 restaurants would close, with the space being converted into "more profitable" Premier Inn hotel rooms. 126 of Whitbread's "less profitable" restaurants would also be put up for sale, with the loss of 1,500 jobs. Batches of restaurants were sold off over a 2 year period, with at least 15 (such as Coombe Lodge, Croydon) being bought by the Papa's Group, which re-opened as a JD Wetherspoons pub as part of a franchise agreement in late December 2025.

In April 2026, Whitbread announced the closure of all 197 remaining restaurants (including Beefeater, Brewers Fayre and Bar + Block), with the loss of around 3,800 jobs. Many of the restaurants are to be converted into "highly profitable" Premier Inn hotel rooms.

In August 2026, it was announced that Queensway, a hospitality group, would acquire 53 Brewers Fayre and Beefeater sites. At the time of announcement, Queensway did not confirm the new brand name, pricing or when the sites would reopen. However, it was later announced that these sites would be called Queensway Inns, and would be reopened gradually.

On 10 September 2026, the remaining Beefeater locations traded for the last time.

In October 2026, it was announced that Common Table Group had acquired 57 former Beefeater and Brewers Fayre sites.
