= Charles Bamforth =

English scientist

Charles Bamforth FRSB, FCIBD
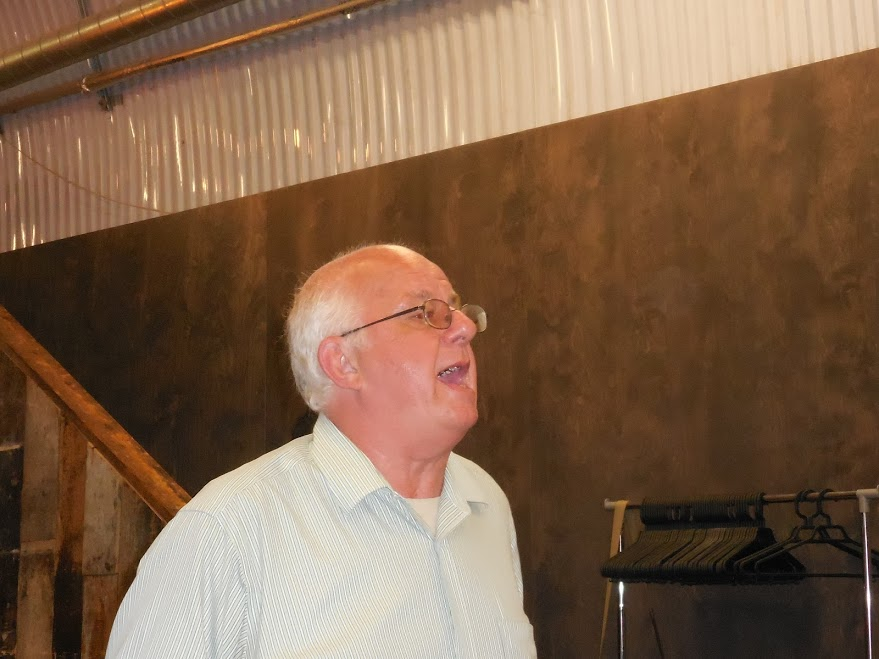
- Charlie Bamforth speaking at an IBD meeting in London, 2016
- Born: Charles William Bamforth; June 1952 (age 74)
- Occupation: Scientist

Charles William Bamforth, FRSB, FCIBD (born June 1952), known as Charlie Bamforth, is an English scientist who specialises in malting and brewing. He is a former president of the Institute of Brewing and Distilling and was also Anheuser-Busch Endowed Professor of Malting and Brewing Sciences at University of California, Davis between 1999 and 2018. Following retirement from the university as Distinguished Professor Emeritus, he became Senior Quality Adviser to the Sierra Nevada Brewing Company.

In addition to a career in the world of beer, Bamforth is also an extensively published author in English association football. He wrote regularly in the match day programmes of Wolverhampton Wanderers, Birmingham City, Walsall and Shrewsbury Town, but also has penned numerous magazine articles and conducted many interviews for the nostalgia site Wolvesheroes.com. He has written two soccer books, most recently the autobiography of Wolves, Nottingham Forest, Derby County and England winger Alan Hinton, who became a North American legend as a player with Vancouver Whitecaps and as a coach with Seattle Sounders.

== Life ==
=== Career ===
Charles Bamforth was born in Upholland, outside Wigan in Lancashire in 1952. His father (who died four months before Charlie was born) was a head teacher. Following schooling at Upholland Grammar School, Charlie graduated from the University of Hull with a Bachelor of Science degree in biochemistry in 1973 and went on to receive a PhD from the same institution in 1977. After a period as a postdoctoral fellow at Sheffield University, he joined Brewing Research International, but in 1983, he went to work at Bass Brewers, where he was Research Manager and Quality Assurance Manager. In 1991, Bamforth became director of research at Brewing Research International. Two years later, he received a Doctor of Science degree from Hull University. In 1999, he took up the post Anheuser-Busch Endowed Professor of Malting and Brewing Sciences at UC Davis. Bamforth retired from UC Davis in 2018 and was appointed Distinguished Professor Emeritus. From January 2019 to December 2025 he was Senior Quality Advisor at the Sierra Nevada Brewing Company.

Between 2014 and 2016, he was President of the Institute of Brewing and Distilling (IBD). He is also a Fellow of the IBD, as well as a Fellow of the Society of Biology and Fellow of the International Academy of Food Science and Technology, and was the Editor-in-Chief of the Journal of the American Society of Brewing Chemists for 18 years. He was visiting professor of Brewing at Heriot-Watt University and has been Honorary Professor at the University of Nottingham since 2006.

=== Research ===
Bamforth's research interests in malting and brewing are diverse and have embraced all raw materials, process stages and product. His work has included studies on the wholesomeness of beer and the psychophysics of beer perception. As a biochemist much of his work has focused on the enzymology of the brewing process, foam stability, preventing oxidation in wort and beer and even alternative paradigms for beer production.

== Honours and awards ==
In 2018, Bamforth received the Recognition Award from the Brewers Association, the Institute of Brewing and Distilling's Horace Brown Medal, and the Award of Honor by the Master Brewers Association of the Americas. He has also received an honorary doctorate from Heriot-Watt University in 2015; the Award of Distinction from the American Society of Brewing Chemists (2011); and the Cambridge Prize from the Institute of Brewing (1984). In 2022, he was made an Honorary Life Member of the Master Brewers Association of the Americas.In 2019 in recognition of his years of service to the brewing industry, the American Society of Brewing Chemists, and his students around the globe, the American Society of Brewing Chemists announced the creation of the Charlie Bamforth Student Travel Award. The award recognizes Dr. Bamforth's teaching, research, and publications by providing a contribution to young researchers. In 2021, the Institute of Brewing and Distilling unveiled the Stewart-Bamforth Educators Award, a competitive prize seeking to “identify malting, brewing, distilling, packaging and cider educators who have made sustained and significant contributions to the global education of brewers and distillers”. In March 2023, Bamforth received the award of Craft Beer Pioneer from the Brewers Cup of California as “an individual who has propelled the craft beer industry over the years and helped shape it into what it is today”. In 2023 he was made an Honorary Life Member of the American Society of Brewing Chemists. In 2026 he was inducted into the American Craft Beer Hall of Fame.

== Bibliography ==
A selection of recent works is included below:

- Bamforth, C.W. Fermentation for Your Culinary Delight (Oxford University Press, 2026).
- Bamforth, C.W. Beer: Tap into the Art and Science of Brewing, 4th ed. (Oxford University Press, 2023).
- Bamforth, C.W. and Fox, G.P. Scientific Principles of Malting and Brewing, Second Edition (American Society of Brewing Chemists, 2023).
- Bamforth, C. W., Practical Guides for Beer Quality: Beer Safety and Wholesomeness (American Society of Brewing Chemists, 2021)
- Bamforth, C. W., In Praise of Beer (Oxford University Press, 2020).
- Bamforth, C.W. 'Everyday Guide To Beer', (Great Courses, 2020)
- Bamforth, C. W., Practical Guides for Beer Quality: Quality Systems (American Society of Brewing Chemists, 2019)
- Bamforth, C. W., Practical Guides for Beer Quality: Color and Clarity (American Society of Brewing Chemists, 2018)
- Bokulich, N. A. and C. W. Bamforth (eds), Brewing Microbiology: Current Research, Omics and Microbial Ecology (Caister Academic Press, 2017).
- Bamforth, C. W, Practical Guides for Beer Quality: Freshness (American Society of Brewing Chemists, 2017).
- Bamforth, C. W. (ed.), Brewing Materials and Processes: A Practical Approach to Beer Excellence (Elsevier, 2016).
- Bamforth, C. W. and R. E. Ward (eds), Oxford Handbook of Food Fermentations (Oxford University Press, 2014).
- Bamforth, C. W., Practical Guides for Beer Quality: Flavor (American Society of Brewing Chemists, 2013).
- Practical Guides for Beer Quality: Foam, American Society of Brewing Chemists, 2012.
- Beer is Proof God Loves Us, FT Press, 2010).
- (ed.), Beer: A Quality Perspective, Handbook of Alcoholic Beverages series, Elsevier, 2008).
- Grape versus Grain (Cambridge University Press, 2008)
- (ed.), Brewing: New Technologies (Woodhead Publishing, 2006)

Preceded by Alan Barclay	President of the Institute of Brewing and Distilling; 2014–2016	Succeeded by Katherine Smart
