= Geoff Palmer (scientist) =

Academic and human rights activist (1940–2025)

Sir Geoff Palmer KT OBE CD
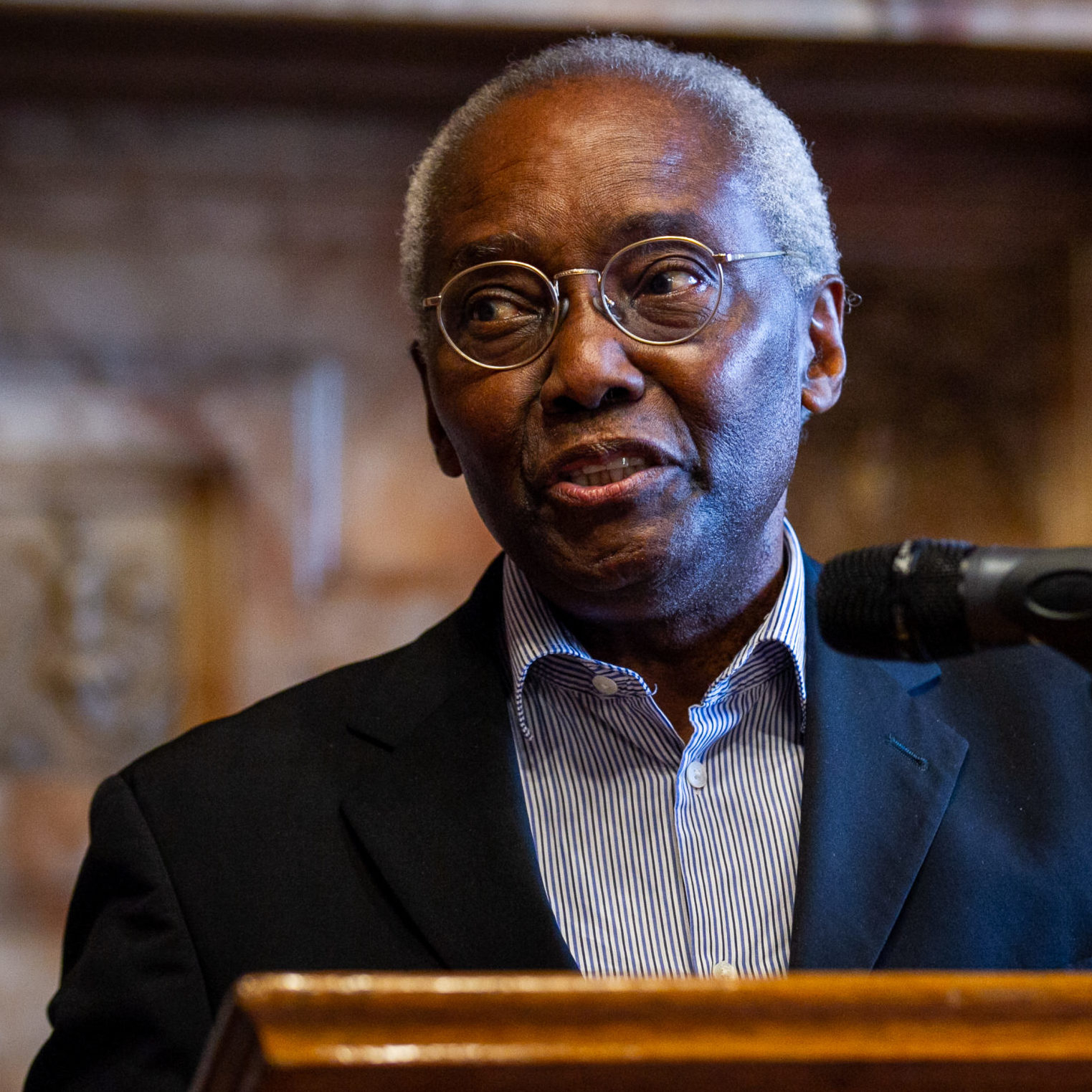
- Photograph of Palmer from November 2019
- Born: Godfrey Henry Oliver Palmer; 9 April 1940; St Elizabeth, Cornwall, Jamaica
- Died: 11 June 2025 (aged 85); Edinburgh, Scotland
- Education: University of Leicester; University of Edinburgh; Heriot-Watt University
- Known for: First black professor in Scotland; Barley abrasion process
- Scientific career
- Doctoral advisor: Edmund Hirst
- Other academic advisors: Anna Macleod
- Notable students: Dawn Maskell

Sir Godfrey Henry Oliver "Geoff" Palmer (9 April 1940 – 11 June 2025) was a Jamaican-British academic and human rights activist who was professor emeritus in the School of Life Sciences at Heriot-Watt University in Edinburgh, Scotland.

Palmer discovered the barley abrasion process while he was a researcher at Heriot-Watt University under the guidance of Anna Macleod. In 1998, Palmer was honoured with the American Society of Brewing Chemists Award of Distinction, considered the "Nobel Prize of brewing".

In 1989, he became the first black professor in Scotland, becoming a professor emeritus after he retired in 2005. He was knighted in the 2014 New Year Honours.

== Early life ==
Palmer was born in St Elizabeth, Jamaica, on 9 April 1940. His father left home when Palmer was seven years old; afterwards his mother moved to work as a dressmaker in England in 1948, part of the Windrush generation. Palmer grew up in Kingston, Jamaica, in the care of his eight aunts.

Palmer joined his mother in London in March 1955, shortly before his 15th birthday, living at a house on the Caledonian Road. He told the story as a student at Heriot-Watt University that he was a stowaway on a banana boat from Jamaica to London. Too young to work, he was assessed as educationally subnormal at his first school, and he was sent to Shelborne Road Secondary Modern. His cricketing skill gained him a place on the London Schools' cricket team, and a place at Highbury Grammar School. After leaving school in 1958 with six O-levels and two A-levels, in Botany and Zoology, he found a job as a junior laboratory technician at Queen Elizabeth College, London University, working for Professor Garth Chapman. He gained further qualifications studying one day a week at a local polytechnic.

In 1961, Palmer studied at the University of Leicester, earning a degree (2:2) in Botany in 1964. He sought post-graduate work, and applied to study for an MSc degree at the University of Nottingham, funded by the Ministry of Agriculture, but he was unsuccessful at interview.

== Academic career ==
After an interview with Professor Anna Macleod, in 1964, he secured a place to study for a PhD degree in grain science and technology jointly with Heriot-Watt College and the University of Edinburgh, beginning his doctorate in 1965. His doctoral supervisor at Edinburgh was the chemist Edmund Hirst. After completing his PhD thesis titled Ultra-structure of cereal grains in relation to germination in 1967, he began his research work at the Brewing Research Foundation in Surrey in 1968, where he worked on the science and technology of barley. He eventually became a senior scientist at the foundation before he moved back to Heriot-Watt University in 1977. After the Nigerian government banned the importation of European malt and barley in the 1980s, Palmer advised the government on the uses of local grains. He received a Doctorate of Science in 1985, and was offered a personal chair at Heriot-Watt in 1989 after Macleod had retired.

Palmer specialised in grain science and had extensive expertise with barley, sorghum, other cereals and malt, having written a textbook on the subject titled Cereal Science and Technology. He investigated the processes that turn barley into malt, and he invented the barley abrasion process while at the Brewing Research Foundation. At Heriot-Watt, he and his students worked on brewing using sorghum. He developed a new simple method to detect pre-germination in cereal grains showing difference in amylase actions of individual grains of a barley sample containing different degrees of pre-germination, with results that can be expressed in optical density. In the journal International Brewer and Distiller, it was reported that Palmer had "requested samples of pre-germinated grain as he is developing a new amylase test which will look at the distribution of the enzyme across individual grains in a sample. A small number of grains, with high amylase/pre-germination activity, can cause unexpected storage or processing problems and visual or average analyses do not always identify uneven distribution."

He attracted and received funding to set up the International Centre for Brewing and Distilling at Heriot-Watt University, through initiating contact with the distilling industry. He also contributed to the Encyclopedia of Seeds and the Encyclopedia of Grain Science, writing the foreword for the latter.

On 29 April 2021, it was announced that Palmer had been appointed the Chancellor of Heriot-Watt University, for an initial term of five years. The role was central to promoting Heriot-Watt's prominence and profile in research in the university's campuses in Scotland, Malaysia and Dubai.

== Views ==
=== Human rights and racial equality work ===
Alongside his academic work, Palmer was also a prominent human rights activist and was involved in a considerable amount of charity work in the community. He wrote a series of articles for the Times Educational Supplement from 1969 to 1971 on ways to improve the education of children from ethnic minorities. His book on race relations, titled Mr. White and the Ravens, was first published in 2001, and he contributed an article to The Scotsman titled "Stephen Lawrence analysis: Society is more mixed but racism has not gone away – we still have a long way to go" (5 January 2012). Palmer also authored a book on the history of slavery, The Enlightenment Abolished: Citizens of Britishness (2007), and spoke out extensively against the slave trade. As an accepted world authority on slavery and the Atlantic slave trade, Toronto and the City of Edinburgh Councils have adopted his views rather than new research from T. M. Devine.

In 2007, the Bicentenary of the passage of the Slave Trade Act 1807 by Parliament, which abolished the slave trade, Professor Geoff Palmer was named among the "100 Great Black Britons", as well as on the 2020 updated list.

He served as the Honorary President of Edinburgh and Lothians Regional Equality Council (ELREC), an Edinburgh-based organisation that works to tackle discrimination and promote human rights and equality in the community, specifically with regard to the nine protected characteristics outlined in the Equality Act 2010. Palmer spoke about the Ethnic Coding in NHS Scotland at ELREC's 40th Annual General Meeting.

Presenter of television programme "Slavery and abolition"

Palmer presented a special episode in the second series of the Scottish Television produced People's History. The programme features the story of James McCune Smith, and as part of it Palmer interviewed Stephen Mullen, the author of the book It wisnae us, which centres on Glasgow and slavery.

=== Melville Monument and slavery ===
During the George Floyd protests, Palmer was the leading proponent of calls to reinterpret the Melville Monument, a large column in St Andrew Square, Edinburgh, dedicated to Scottish statesman Henry Dundas, due to his support for "gradual abolition", which delayed the abolition of the slave trade by fifteen years. Noting that he did not support the removal of controversial statues "because [they are] part of black history", Palmer instead called on Scottish society to "take down... racism". On 4 April 2021, Palmer appeared on an episode of the BBC's Antiques Roadshow, presenting his antique collection of silver sugar bowls and tongs. On the programme, he described the significance of these items to slavery: "After the 200-year commemoration of the abolition of the slave trade, I decided to look at sugar, because it was one of the main reasons for slavery. I thought I would find some evidence of this and acquired these silver items. While slaves were working and dying, people... were consuming the sugar, in those bowls, and with those tongs. To me, those silver bowls tell us the sort of things we do in order to make money, and to have a lifestyle that we think we deserve."

== Awards and honours ==
In recognition of his work and achievements in the field of grain science, Palmer was appointed Officer of the Order of the British Empire (OBE) in the 2003 Birthday Honours.

In 1998, Palmer became the fourth individual, and first European, to be honoured with the American Society of Brewing Chemists (ASBC) Award for distinction in scientific research and good citizenship: he received the award in Boston, Massachusetts, in 2008. Palmer was awarded honorary doctorates by Abertay University in 2009, The Open University in 2010, the University of the West Indies in 2015, and Heriot-Watt University in 2015.

He was knighted in the 2014 New Year Honours for services to human rights, science, and charity.

In August 2015, Palmer was the guest of interviewer Jim Al-Khalili on the BBC Radio 4 programme The Life Scientific.

In 2020, Palmer was awarded Commander of Order of Distinction in the Jamaican national honours. In December 2021, the Citizens Advice building in Penicuik was named "Palmer House" in his honour.

On 14 November 2022, Palmer received the Edinburgh Award from the Edinburgh City Council. In December 2022, with Lord Carloway, Lord President of the Court of Session, Palmer unveiled a plaque commemorating the 1778 Knight v Wedderburn case, which ruled that slavery was incompatible with Scots law.

In March 2024, King Charles III appointed Palmer a Knight of the Most Ancient and Most Noble Order of the Thistle (KT), the highest order of chivalry in Scotland.

== Personal life and death ==
Palmer lived in the town of Penicuik in Midlothian from 1977 onwards. He was married to educational psychologist Margaret Palmer and had three children.

Palmer died on 11 June 2025, at the age of 85.

== Works ==
- 2001: Mr White and the Ravens, Gopher, novel
- 2007: The Enlightenment Abolished: Citizens of Britishness, Henry Publishing, memoir and articles
