= Ewart Boddington =

English brewing executive (1927–2015)

Ewart Agnew Boddington JP DL (7 April 1927 – 3 December 2015) was an English brewing executive, who served as chairman and President of Boddington's and President of the Institute of Brewing.

== Life ==
=== Early life and family ===
Boddington was born on 7 April 1927, the second son of Charles Geoffrey Boddington of Heawood Hall. He was educated at Stowe School and then Trinity College, Cambridge, where he was an organ scholar in 1945; he graduated with a Bachelor of Arts degree in 1947, and proceeded to a Master of Arts degree in 1951.

In 1954, he married Anne Clayton Vine and had three children, two sons and one daughter: Jane (born 1956), Ian Geoffrey (born 1959) and Edward Louis Agnew (born 1965).

=== Boddington's ===
Boddington became joint managing director of Boddingtons Brewery in 1957 and took over as chairman in 1970; he served until 1988, when he became President of the company (now The Boddington Group Plc) and remained in that position until 1995. The brewery had been taken over by his great-great-grandfather, Henry Boddington, in 1853 and remained in the family. In 1971, sales of Boddingtons's ales increased by 5.2%, nearly double the national average. Beer sales continued to rise and in 1974 they were marked by a "significant increase" on the previous year and the percentages were higher than the national average. In 1977, Boddingtons increased its beer sales by 24%, despite national beer sales stagnating.

This occurred at a time when lager sales continued to grow and absorb a larger market share. Boddington himself had said that he thought people visiting his pubs wanted ales, rather than lager, and the company would continue to develop its traditional beers. It also planned to increase ale prices by 1p, while a development programme which included the creation of a new laboratory on its Strangeways site, was due to be completed in 1978. In 1981, the company made a 19.8% increase on pre-tax profits, but Boddington announced that prices would have to increase due to rising costs.

In 1982, Boddingtons took over Oldham Brewery at a cost of £23 million, but still made a pre-tax profit and bucked the national trend of decreasing beer sales. But, by April 1984, beer sales at the company were staying "around its 15-month low-point", despite optimism from Boddington.

Boddingtons invested £4.7 million in the business in 1984, which Boddington suggested was partly responsible for an increase in profits. The company had grown despite stagnant beer sales owing to high unemployment; instead growth in the retail, catering and managed homes operations added to the profit margin. In 1985, Boddingtons took over Higson's, a Liverpool-based lager brewer with 160 pubs in the Merseyside area, for £27 million; the combined annual sales would amount to £65 million. The Guardian reported that "The deal will give Boddingtons the presence it wants in the lager market, helped by Higsons' new [£6 million] lager brewery in Liverpool." Boddington said it offers "the chance to develop sales of own-produced lager and to position itself for the future in this growing and higher margin sector of the beer market". This enlarged share of the lager market contributed to a rise in profits which saw the company's shares increased by 3p in September 1985; the amount of beer sold continued to fall, but lager sales increased by 10% over the previous six months.

In October 1987, Midsummer Leisure, a rapidly growing company owning fun pubs, disco halls and snooker halls, offered a share swap; the terms valued each Boddington share at 228p (a sharp rise on 61p, which they were valued at prior to the offer) and the whole business at £270 million. The offer was dropped, however, after Whitbread and Britannic Assurance, Boddington shareholders with a combined 34% of the stock, rejected the offer.

The following January, it was announced that 200 jobs would be cut and the Oldham Brewery, which Boddingtons had acquired in 1982, would be closed as part of an "efficiency drive"; directors blamed the poor state of the beer market, and Boddington himself said: "The industry is, at best, static and it is very competitive". That March, end of year profits were found to be up less than 1%, blamed in part on rationalisation costs and a "sluggish" regional economy. As The Times summarised, "a brewer best known for its traditional ales, Boddington is still struggling to climb aboard the lager bandwagon." The company was also diversifying: in 1987 it secured an 80% holding in Village Leisure Hotels, which was adding profit, and a gastropub chain called Henry's Table, which the company was developing and expanding. Boddington was asked about whether Whitbread's shareholdings protected Boddington's from a hostile take-over and he replied "There is some sense of security but you have to perform if you are to remain independent. That we intend to do".

Despite pre-tax increases in profit in the six months up to July 1988, Boddington stepped down as Chairman that September, with Dennis Cassidy succeeding him. According to The Independent, "The move signals a shift of emphasis by Boddington, hampered by an old fashioned 'ale house' image for several years."

=== Other work and later life ===
Boddington was President of the Institute of Brewing from 1972 to 1974, and Chairman of the Brewers' Society in 1984–85; as chairman of the latter group, he lobbied Nigel Lawson, the Chancellor of the Exchequer, to reduce taxation on beer in his 1985 budget. He was commissioned as a Justice of the Peace for Chester in 1959, served as High Sheriff of Cheshire in 1978–79, and was a Deputy Lieutenant for the county from 1993 till his death. He died on 3 December 2015.

Preceded by Anna Macleod	President of the Institute of Brewing; 1972–1974	Succeeded by Anthony John Richard Purssell
