= Dawn Maskell =

British brewer and professor

Dawn Louise Maskell
- Education: Oxford Brookes University
- Scientific career
- Workplaces: Heriot-Watt University
- Thesis: Influence of stress on replicative longevity in saccharomyces cerevisiae (syn. S. pastorianus) (2003)
- Academic advisors: Geoff Palmer

Dawn Louise Maskell is a British brewer who is Professor of Brewing and Distilling at Heriot-Watt University. She is Director of the Centre for Sustainable Brewing and Distilling. Maskell is a Fellow of the Chartered Institute of Brewers and Distillers, an honorary liveryman of the Worshipful Company of Brewers and holds the Freedom of the City of London.

== Early life and education ==
Maskell studied brewing and distilling as an undergraduate at Oxford Brookes University. She completed her doctorate in yeast physiology, investigating how stress impacted replicative longevity in saccharomyces cerevisiae. She completed a Diploma in brewing at the Institute of Brewing and Distilling. Maskell was trained by Geoff Palmer, who became chancellor of Heriot-Watt University.

== Research and career ==
Maskell started her career as a yeast physiologist, and has studied the production of gin, vodka and whisky. She has studied the applications of co-products of alcohol production, including as high protein food ingredients and animal feed. She was appointed Director of the International Centre for Brewing and Distilling. She helped to establish the Centre for Sustainable Brewing and Distilling, a £35 million centre centre dedicated to responsible innovation in the drinks sectors. The Centre is developing a pilot brewery and distillery powered by renewable energy.

In 2025, Maskell was appointed Vice President of the American Society of Brewing Chemists. Later that year, she was made a Fellow of the Chartered Institute of Brewers and Distillers and Chair for the Scottish Beer Awards. At the Women in Beer awards, Maskell was named Mentor of the Year in recognition of her commitment to the development of a future generation of brewers.

== Selected publications ==
- Jane S White; Kelly L Stewart; Dawn L Maskell; Aboubakry Diallo; Julio E Traub-Modinger; Nik A Willoughby (16 March 2020). "Characterization of Pot Ale from a Scottish Malt Whisky Distillery and Potential Applications". ACS Omega. 5 (12): 6429–6440. doi:10.1021/acsomega.9b04023. ISSN 2470-1343. PMC 7114139. PMID 32258878. Wikidata Q91657524.
- Dawn L Maskell; Alan I Kennedy; Jeff A Hodgson; Katherine A Smart (1 April 2003). "Chronological and replicative lifespan of polyploid Saccharomyces cerevisiae (syn. S. pastorianus)". FEMS Yeast Research. 3 (2): 201–209. doi:10.1016/s1567-1356(02)00199-x. ISSN 1567-1356. PMID 12702453. Wikidata Q44408300.
- Struan James Reid; Robert Alexander Speers; Nik Willoughby; William Bain Lumsden; Dawn Louise Maskell (12 March 2020). "Pre-fermentation of malt whisky wort using Lactobacillus plantarum and its influence on new-make spirit character". Food Chemistry. 320 126605. doi:10.1016/j.foodchem.2020.126605. ISSN 0308-8146. PMID 32229395. Wikidata Q90764750.
