= Arthur Harold John Brook =

Former English brewer and brewing executive (1907 – 1985)

- Born: 1907; Manchester
- Died: 20 January 1985 (aged 77–78)
- Occupation: brewer

Arthur Harold John Brook (1907 – 20 January 1985) was an English brewer and brewing executive who served as President of the Institute of Brewing.

== Life ==
Arthur Harold John Brook was born in Manchester in 1907, the son of Samuel Brook, a sugar merchant. He went to Berkhamsted School in Hertfordshire between 1919 and 1925 and then spent a year at the Cotton Exchange in Manchester, before entering Duttons Brewery as a pupil in 1926. He was the assistant brewer there by 1934, when he took up an equivalent post at Oldham Brewery. By the end of the year, he was its Head Brewer. In 1938, he became a director at a company of maltsters called Edward Sutcliffe. In 1947, he returned to Duttons as a director and took up the same post at Oldham in 1956; that year, he also became the latter's Chairman. In 1982, Oldham merged with Boddington's and he was given a seat on their Board, but retired two years later.

Brook was National Chairman of the Allied Brewery Traders' Association in 1961 and became President of the Institute of Brewing three years later. Between 1971 and 1982, he was President of the Manchester Brewery School, having long served it as Honorary Treasurer.

Brook married Helen Margaret "Margie" in 1936 and the couple had three sons—Patrick, Paul and Philip—and one daughter, Elizabeth. His wife predeceased him, and he died on 30 January 1985, survived by his children.

Preceded by Francis Northey Richardson	President of the Institute of Brewing; 1964 – 1966	Succeeded by Norman Bryce Smiley
