= Cecil Ernest Wells Charrington =

Cecil Ernest Wells Charrington, MC, JP (31 March 1885 – 24 October 1962) was an English brewing executive, who served for 26 years as Chairman of Charrington and Co. and was twice President of the Institute of Brewing.

== Life ==
Cecil Ernest Wells Charrington was born on 31 March 1885, the only son of Ernest Charrington (1853–1894) and his wife Joanna Margaret, younger daughter of the portrait painter Henry Tanworth Wells (1828–1903). In 1919, he married Dorothy Mary Cecilia Jameson, daughter of Rev. Canon Frederick Gosnal Jameson Page, master of Lord Leycester Hospital; they had one son and two daughters.

Charrington was educated at Eton College between 1898 and 1904, before going up to New College, Oxford; he gained third-class moderations in Classics in 1906 and left with a second class Modern History degree two years later. His ancestor John Charrington had founded a brewery in 1757; by the early 20th century, this was called Charrington and Company Limited. Charrington served as a director of the company for "nearly 50 years" before retiring in 1960. His career was interrupted by the First World War, when he served with the South Staffordshire Regiment in France and Belgium, was wounded and received the Military Cross (1918).

In 1923 he became Chairman of Charrington's, retiring in 1949, and took an active role in various brewing associations. He was Master of the Brewers' Company in 1930 and Chairman of the Brewers' Society three years later; he joined the Institute of Brewing in 1909, became a Council member in 1933, was twice its President, in 1937 and 1944 (in the former term, he applied for a grant of arms for the Institute, and paid the costs himself), and served as a Trustee from 1941 to 1950, when he was involved in the establishment of the Brewing Industry Research Foundation and helped to find new offices for the Institute. Other positions included President of the London Central Board in 1928 and 1946, President of the Licensed Victuallers' School between 1928 and 1929, President of the Beer and Wine Trade Benevolent Society in 1936 and President of the Licensed Victuallers National Homes in 1938.

Charrington was involved with several charitable institutions and served as a Justice of the Peace. In work, he was described in his obituary as "tireless ... a stimulating and staunch friend"; although in person he was "a little shy ... he was in all the vicissitudes of life a man of outstanding courage". He died on 24 October 1962, survived by his wife and children.

== Likenesses ==
- Cecil Ernest Wells Charrington by Bassano Ltd (half-plate film negative), 8 January 1948. National Portrait Gallery, London (Photographs Collection, NPG x71765; given by Bassano & Vandyk Studios, 1974).

Preceded by Sydney Oswald Nevile	Master of the Brewers' Company; 1930	Succeeded by Horace Legard Grimston
Preceded by Harold Wallis Harman	President of the Institute of Brewing; 1937 – 1938	Succeeded by Thomas Edward Grant
Preceded by Harold Wallis Harman	President of the Institute of Brewing; 1944 – 1945	Succeeded by Walter Scott
