= Anna Macleod =

Scottish biochemist

Anna MacGillivray Macleod
- Born: 15 May 1917; Kirkhill, Scotland
- Died: 13 August 2004 (aged 87); Edinburgh, Scotland
- Education: Invergordon Academy; Edinburgh Ladies' College
- Alma mater: University of Edinburgh
- Known for: authority on brewing and distillation world's first female Professor of Brewing and Biochemistry
- Awards: Horace Brown medal
- Scientific career
- Fields: biochemistry, botany, brewing
- Institutions: Heriot-Watt University
- Doctoral students: Geoff Palmer

Anna MacGillivray Macleod (15 May 1917 – 13 August 2004) was a Scottish biochemist and academic, an authority on brewing and distilling. She was a professor at Heriot-Watt University in Edinburgh. She was the world's first female Professor of Brewing and Biochemistry.

== Family ==
Born in Kirkhill, she was the daughter of Margaret Ingram Sangster and Rev. Alasdair MacGillivray Macleod. Her family lineage traces to the Isle of Lewis, where her grandfather, Rev. George Macleod, was the Minister of Garrabost. Her father was also born on the Isle of Lewis. She was second cousin to politician and former Chancellor of the Exchequer, Iain Norman Macleod. Her family belongs to the branch of the Macleods of Pabbay and Uig, a branch of the Chiefs of MacLeods of Lewis.

Her father, Rev. Alasdair MacGillivray Macleod, was a Minister of the Church, died at an early age. He and her mother, Margaret Ingram Sangster were both in 1914 graduates of Aberdeen University. Her two brothers were both doctors of medicine: her elder brother was Dr. John George Macleod, editor of Davidson's Textbook of Medicine and the author of Macleod's Clinical Examination, and her younger brother was Dr. Alasdair MacGillivray Macleod, a general practitioner in Linlithgow.

She showed an interest in her family's genealogy, research on which she had started.

== Education and profession ==
Macleod was educated at Invergordon Academy and Edinburgh Ladies' College. In 1939 she graduated from the University of Edinburgh with a BSc with honours in botany and was awarded the Anderson Henry Prize in Botany for her essay on “The plant ecology of Colonsay”. She joined the faculty of Heriot-Watt University in 1945, where she remained until her retirement in 1977. She returned in 1951 to the University of Edinburgh to study for her PhD. In the late 1960s, she was awarded a Doctor of Science, from the university, for a thesis on the germination of barley.

In 1961, together with Leslie Samuel Cobley, she co-edited "Contemporary Botanical Thought", published by Oliver and Boyd. She edited the Journal of the Institute of Brewing from 1964 to 1976, and she was the first female President of that organisation (now the Institute of Brewing and Distilling), from 1970 to 1972. In 1975, she was appointed Professor of Brewing at Heriot-Watt University. In 1976, she was the recipient of the Horace Brown medal. She retired in 1977, as professor emeritus.

During her time at Heriot-Watt University, Macleod supervised the PhD work of Sir Geoff Palmer.

In 1993, Heriot-Watt University awarded her an honorary Doctorate of Science for her discovery of gibberellic acid, which was a great advantage for the maltsters, as it shortened the malting process. At that occasion, the Dean of the Faculty of Science, Professor Philip G. Harper, mentioned that Macleod's association with the brewing industry puts her in the same fraternity as other scientists, such as James Watt (power), Louis Pasteur (pasteurisation), Peter Griess (colour chemistry), Joseph Williams Lovibond (colour physics), Gosset (statistics) and the man after whom the medal was named. He said that she was recognised nationally and internationally with distinction as a university teacher, scholar, scientist, technologist and as a brewer.

== Death and legacy ==
Anna Macleod died at St Raphaels, Edinburgh on 13 August 2004, possibly of sepsis.

Heriot-Watt University's Edinburgh campus has a residence hall named in her honour.

Heriot-Watt University's International Centre for Brewing and Distilling (ICBD), as it is now called, started the Anna Macleod Scholarship with a financial gift she had bequeathed to that University in her will.

Preceded by Clifford Furness Mackay	President of the Institute of Brewing; 1970–1972	Succeeded by Ewart Agnew Boddington
