= Charles Tidbury =

English brewing executive

Sir Charles Henderson Tidbury, DL (26 January 1926 – 3 July 2003) was an English brewing executive who was Chairman of Whitbread and President of the Institute of Brewing.

== Early life and military career ==
Charles Henderson Tidbury was born in Camberley, Surrey, on 26 January 1926, the son of Brigadier O. H. Tidbury, MC, and his wife Beryl, née Pearce. Following schooling at Eton College, he joined the King's Royal Rifle Corps in 1944 and served in Palestine from 1946 to 1948 during the Palestine Emergency. When he returned from Palestine, he learnt Russian at London University and trained to be an interpreter, working thereafter in GCHQ and Germany, before leaving the Army in 1952. He signed up to the Territorial Army (TA) once he left active service, and stayed with the Queen's Westminsters until 1960.

== Brewing ==
In 1950, Tidbury married Anne, daughter of Brigadier H. E. Russell, DSO; she was the niece of Colonel Bill Whitbread, who was the long-serving Chairman of Whitbread & Co. Ltd, the brewers. After being discharged from active service, Tidbury started work for the firm; he trained at their Mackeson brewery in Hythe, Kent, before training in rotation at the company's Head Office in London. The following year, he informally became an assistant director and was formally appointed to the position in 1957. In 1959, he was appointed managing director, a role in which he served until his promotion to chief executive officer in 1974. Three years later, he became the company's Deputy chairman and between 1978 and 1984 he was its chairman, remaining on the board until 1988. He also served as director of Whitbread Investment Co. Plc (1975–93) and Gales Brewery in Horndean (1989–96).

By the 1960s, some larger competitors were beginning to take over and amalgamate with smaller breweries; at first, Whitbread's had provided capital exchanges as part of an "umbrella" to protect smaller brewers from takeovers, and in 1966 Tidbury was appointed Chairman of one such firm, Brickwoods Brewery Ltd., a post he held until 1971. But many of these smaller breweries would eventually be taken over by Whitbread's over the course of the 1960s as competition intensified. This left Whitbread one of the "Big Six" brewing companies in the country, but also prompted a rationalisation of the business structure. As the Times summarised, Tidbury's work at the top-tier of this re-organisation "helped to steer Whitbread through a difficult period for both the company and the industry as a whole". Despite beer and spirit sales decreasing during his Chairmanship, Whitbread increased its sales of soft-drinks, introduced more efficient means of production, formed links with Heineken and supermarkets, bought up hotels and developed the Beefeater gastropub chain. This new management plan saw overall sales increase, but meant 1,800 jobs were cut and several breweries closed, decisions which, according to the Times, were not easy for Tidbury, who as "a member of the old school [who] always adhered to rather paternalistic principles of loyalty ... [he] knew his pubs and his people."

Tidbury was also involved in his industry's professional associations. He served as President of the Institute of Brewing from 1976 to 1978, and Chairman of the Brewer's Society between 1982 and 1984, after which he was its Vice-President. He was Master of the Brewer's Company in 1988. Other positions included President of the British Institute of Innkeeping (1985–92) and President of the Brewing Research Foundation International from 1993 (having previously been its chairman since 1985).

== Later life ==
Away from brewing, Tidbury was a Conservative supporter and donor; between 1988 and 1993, he was a Director of the Centre for Policy Studies. In 1986, he was asked by Sir Geoffrey Howe to be Chairman of the William and Mary Tercentenary Trust, which would raise money and organise celebrations to mark the 300th anniversary of the Glorious Revolution of 1688. This made him a potential target for the Provisional Irish Republican Army, and his name was found on an IRA list of targets in 1988. Two years later, two intruders (Pearse McAuley and Nessan Quinlivan) were spotted in the garden of Tidbury’s house by an armed police protection team. They were later arrested at Stonehenge in Wiltshire by a police armed response unit and subsequently charged with conspiracy to murder him, although they escaped prison before their trial.

Tidbury also held directorships on Barclays, ICL Europe, Mercantile Group, Nabisco Group, Pearl Assurance and Vaux Group. On a local level, he was a Governor of Portsmouth University from 1988 to 1996 and chaired the Governing Body at Portsmouth High School from 1992 to 1996, during which time he also served on the Portsmouth and South East Hampshire Health Committee. He was appointed a Deputy Lieutenant for Hampshire in 1989, the same year he received a knighthood. He took a keen interest in sailing and maritime history, and was a Trustee of the National Maritime Museum. Tidbury died on 3 July 2003.

== Arms ==
Coat of arms of Charles Tidbury

Notes
Granted 29 March 1991 by Cole (Garter) and Wagner (Clarenceux).
Crest
Issuant from water barry wavy Azure and Argent a demi grey Shire Horse Proper Sable resting its sinister hoof on a Maltese Cross Vert.
Escutcheon
Argent two barrulets dancetty interlaced Azure between in chief the head of a spear point upwards surmounted by its shaft and base saltirewise fracted Proper and banded Gules between two tuns Sable hooped Or and in base a rose Gules barbed and seeded Proper.
Motto
Promptus Et Volens

Preceded by Anthony John Richard Purssell	President of the Institute of Brewing; 1976–1978	Succeeded by Peter Beal Hossell
Preceded by Sir Derrick Holden-Brown	Master of the Brewers' Company; 1988	Succeeded by Michael Noel Francis Cottrell
