= Gerard Tuite =

Irish Republican

Gerard Tuite (born 1955) was a senior member of the Provisional Irish Republican Army. Upon his escape from Brixton prison during the hunger strike in the winter of 1980, he was declared "Britain's most wanted man". Following his capture, at 26 years of age, in the spring of 1982 he made Irish legal history as the first citizen of the Republic of Ireland to be charged with an offence committed in another country. His prosecution in the Republic of Ireland, for offences committed in the United Kingdom, was a landmark in international law.

== Background ==
Tuite was born into a staunchly republican family in Mountnugent, County Cavan, one of the nine sons and two daughters born to Michael Tuite, a small farmer, and Jane (née Dermody) Tuite.

His parents' wedding day on 30 September 1942 made national headlines when the wedding party was stormed by the Garda Síochána. According to the family the Garda shot a traditional musician called Finnegan in the leg and this was followed by a gun battle reminiscent of the Irish Civil War. The Garda were seeking the bride's brother, Patrick Dermody, a commanding officer of the IRA's Eastern Command who was on the run at the time. By the end of the battle Patrick Dermody was dead and Detective Garda M. J. Walsh was fatally wounded and died later in hospital.

Gerry Tuite attended Kilnacrott Abbey secondary school in Ballyjamesduff, County Cavan. In 1982 a fellow student remembered him thus: 'The only thing remarkable about him in those days was that he was unremarkable. He was a very inoffensive person – a nice quiet fellow.' He was viewed locally as the one member of the family most likely to stay out of politics, and was better known as a motorcycle enthusiast. In his late teens he became a merchant sailor. Little is known about him from this point until 1978.

== IRA activity ==
In 1978, he was using the nom de guerre David Coyne and was believed to be a young businessman of German-Irish extraction when he met a nurse called Helen Griffiths at a party in London in the summer of 1978. Within a short time he had moved into Griffiths' flat in 144 Trafalgar Road, Greenwich. Her work allowed him much time in the flat on his own. Before the end of the year he was found guilty of possession of explosives with intent to endanger life. A sawn-off shotgun and Armalite rifle were also found at the flat. These and other items, including car keys and voice recordings, linked him to other bombings as well as the targeting of senior British Conservative and royal figures. According to historian J. Bowyer Bell, he had been involved in no fewer than eighteen bombing attacks in five British cities with Patrick Magee, the Brighton bomber, alone.

Tuite served his sentence in Brixton Prison. On 16 December 1980 he escaped with two British inmates, Jimmy Moody and Stan Thompson. They cut through the brickwork of their cells in the remand wing, dropping into a yard, where builders' planks and scaffolding were used to climb the wall. Coming during a major IRA hunger strike this was a boost to the morale of the movement, and consequently his escape was deemed to be a political emergency. The escape led the British police to immediately issue 16,500 posters of him under the heading "Terrorist Alert. This Man Must Be Caught." On 4 March 1982 Tuite was finally discovered, during a Special Branch raid on a flat in Drogheda, Ireland. In July 1982 he made Irish legal history when he became the first man sentenced in the Republic of Ireland for offences committed in the United Kingdom. He was sentenced by the Special Criminal Court to 10 years imprisonment for possessing explosives in London.
