= George Mesnard Parsons =

George Mesnard Parsons (1890 – 26 February 1963) was an English brewer who served as President of the Institute of Brewing.

== Career ==
Parsons was born in 1890. He entered the brewing industry as a pupil at the Swan Brewery in Fulham in 1910. He later worked at two London breweries, rose to be a junior brewer and received the Silver Medal in Malting and Brewing from the City and Guilds of London Institute. His career was interrupted by service in the First World War, during which he was stationed in France.

On demobilisation, he returned to his old profession, this time as second brewer at Young & Co.'s Brewery Ltd. in Wandsworth. In 1935, he took up the post of Head Brewer at Eldridge Pope & Co. While there, he became involved in the Institute of Brewing's London Section Committee. He went on to serve on IOB's Examination Committee before being elected an Ordinary Member of the IOB's Council in 1953. The following year, he was appointed its deputy president and in 1956 became president, in which role he served for two years. In 1962, he became its vice-president. He also served on Incorporated Brewers' Guild's Committee on Brewing Careers in 1952 and 1957. Parsons was also involved in several masonic circles.

Parsons died on 26 February 1963 leaving a widow, two sons and a daughter. According to his obituary in the IOB's journal, he "served whole-heartedly so many sections of our Industry".

Preceded by John Edmund Martineau	President of the Institute of Brewing; 1956 – 1958	Succeeded by Maurice Arthur Pryor
