= Pearse McAuley =

Provisional IRA member (1964/1965 – 2024)

- Born: 9 November 1964 Strabane, County Tyrone, Northern Ireland
- Died: 18 March 2024 (aged 59) Strabane, County Tyrone, Northern Ireland
- Paramilitary: Provisional IRA
- Conflicts: The Troubles; Killing of Jerry McCabe
- Spouse: Pauline Tully (m. 2003; sep. 2014)
- Children: 2

Pearse McAuley (9 November 1964 – c. 18 March 2024) was a Provisional IRA member, who escaped from Brixton Prison in London on 7 July 1991 along with his cellmate Nessan Quinlivan, while awaiting trial on charges relating to a suspected plot to assassinate former brewery company chairman, Sir Charles Tidbury.

McAuley fled to Ireland, where he was granted bail while contesting extradition to Britain.

== Manslaughter conviction ==
In 1999, McAuley was convicted of manslaughter in Dublin's Special Criminal Court for his role in the killing of Detective Garda Jerry McCabe in the course of an armed robbery. He was sentenced to 14 years in prison.

McAuley was released from prison in August 2009, having served ten-and-a-half years of his sentence. The Crown Prosecution Service announced it would not seek his extradition on charges related to the Brixton escape. His release prompted adverse commentary in the Irish press, with McAuley being described as a "psychopathic gun nut".

== Marriage and separation ==
In 2003, he married Pauline Tully, a Sinn Féin councillor on Cavan County Council and was granted day release from prison to attend the wedding. The couple had two sons, and separated in February 2014.

== Conviction for stabbing wife ==
On Christmas Eve 2014, McAuley was arrested for stabbing Tully thirteen times in front of their two children at their home in Kilnaleck, County Cavan. He was found guilty on 28 November 2015, and on 2 December 2015 was sentenced to 12 years' imprisonment, the final four suspended.

In her victim impact statement, Tully said "I am in absolute fear of him and fear that someday he will make another attempt on my life. I do not ever expect to enjoy a peaceful mind, but will live a life haunted by what happened to me."

McAuley was released from prison on 24 June 2022.

McAuley was found dead at his home in Strabane on 18 March 2024. He was 59. It is suspected that he died of natural causes a number of days before his body was found. He was buried in Strabane Cemetery on 21 March 2024.
