= Harold Wallis Harman =

English brewer and brewing executive

Harold Wallis Harman (1875 – 31 January 1959) was an English brewer and brewing executive.

== Life ==
Harold Wallis Harman was born in Brixton in 1875, the son of "a medical man". He attended the Merchant Taylors' School and the Royal College of Science before working at a sugar refinery in Greenock. He later went to work in the laboratory of Lawrence Briant in London, before taking up a position in the laboratory of the Southwark brewery belonging to Barclay, Perkings and Co. Ltd. In 1906 he resumed working for Briant and married his daughter, Phyllis. He became a partner in the firm; when Briant died in 1923, Harman took over as senior partner.

Harman became a member of the Institute of Brewing in 1905 and served as its President in 1936–37 and 1943–44, having been chairman of the London Section in 1929–30, chairman of the Institute's Analysis Committee for 18 years, and a long-term Council member. In 1923 he gave evidence to the Ministry of Health about the use of preservatives and colourings in food. Later in the 1920s and 1930s, he chaired the Institute's Hops Advisory Sub-Committee (from 1923) and the equivalent for Yeast (from 1924). In 1936–38 he chaired the Research Fund Committee.

Outside of Brewing, Harman spent much of his time on his farm in Leith Hill, Surrey, and the surrounding countryside, where he enjoyed fly-fishing. He was also committed to the YMCA and served on the Central Council of its Metropolitan branch. A "distinguished yet unassuming man", Harman died on 31 January 1959.

Preceded by Christopher George	President of the Institute of Brewing; 1936 – 1937	Succeeded by Cecil Ernest Wells Charrington
Preceded by George Thomas Cook	President of the Institute of Brewing; 1943 – 1944	Succeeded by Cecil Ernest Wells Charrington
