= James Herbert Porter =

English brewer and brewing executive

Lieutenant-Colonel James Herbert Porter, CBE, DSO*, (died 22 March 1973) was an English brewer and brewing executive.

== Life ==
James Herbert Porter was born in Burton upon Trent, the son of a master brewer. He began working for Newcastle Breweries in 1909, but his career was interrupted by the First World War, during which time he received the Distinguished Service Order twice for gallantry.

After the war, Porter returned to Newcastle Breweries. The company's directors became aware of the rising demand for bottled beer in the early 1920s and they asked their brewers to begin developing a new product. As assistant brewer, Porter worked alongside the firm's chief chemist, Archie Jones, to create a new formula: Newcastle Brown Ale. First advertised in 1927, it won all seven major awards at the 1928 Breweries Exhibition. Porter became managing director of Newcastle Breweries in 1931; five years later, he was appointed to the Institute of Brewing's Council, and he served as its president between 1939 and 1941. In 1948 he was appointed a vice-chairman of the institute's Research Fund Committee and served on the council until 1951. Having been a member of the IOB since 1915, he received life membership in 1965.

In 1953 Porter was appointed vice-chairman of Newcastle Breweries and two years later became its chairman. Following the company's merger with Scottish Breweries in 1960, he became the latter group's vice-chairman and subsequently its vice-president. He died on 22 March 1973, aged 81, leaving a widow, two daughters and one son, Henry, who became chairman of Newcastle Breweries and a director at Newcastle and Scottish Breweries.

Preceded by Thomas Edward Grant	President of the Institute of Brewing; 1939 – 1941	Succeeded by George Thomas Cook
