= Simon Levy case =

British sexual sadist and murderer (born 1985)

Simon Levy (born 14 August 1985) is a British convicted sex offender, sexual sadist and double murderer from Tottenham, north London, serving a whole-life sentence for the murders of Carmenza Valencia-Trujillo and Sheryl Wilkins, two women who were killed in March and August 2025, as well as two life sentences for the rape of a third woman. Levy was on bail and being monitored by the Metropolitan Police Service at the time he committed the offences. Levy killed two women in the span of months during violent, sexually motivated attacks while under investigation for a series of assaults on the London Underground. He was convicted in August 2026, and sentenced at the Old Bailey. Police and the Crown Prosecution Service have apologised for the handling of the case, while the Independent Office for Police Conduct (IOPC) have launched an investigation into the matter.

== Background ==
Levy, described as an unemployed loner who lived with his mother, first came to the attention of police in 2017 when a woman complained she had been sexually assaulted by him at an event in south London. However, the case was not prosecuted. He was first convicted of sexual offences against women in September 2021, when he was sentenced to three years in prison for assaults committed against two women in 2018. The presiding judge decided against issuing a Sexual Harm Prevention Order, which would have placed limits on his activity upon release, but noted that upon his release he would be "subject indefinitely" to the monitoring requirements for convicted sex offenders. In April 2022, and while an inmate at HMP Brixton, he sexually assaulted a female prison officer, but was not questioned about the incident until five months after his release in February 2023. He was returned to custody in May 2024 to complete his sentence following an allegation of rape. Also in May 2024, Levy sustained injuries during an attack by another prisoner that left him with partial sight in one eye, and would claim this had left him unsteady on his feet. Following his release in August 2024, the Metropolitan Police downgraded Levy's potential risk to women from high-risk to medium-risk.

Between October 2023 and May 2025, Levy committed a series of sexual offences against women on the London Underground. He was arrested by British Transport Police in November 2024, but delays in organising an identity parade led to him being free for a further six months. During the time between his arrest for the London Underground offences and his arrest for murder, Levy was granted bail by two separate court hearings, and failed to appear at Crown Court on three occasions, one of them less than two weeks before he killed his second victim. However, in spite of his repeated failure to attend court, no warrant was issued for Levy's arrest.

== Murders of Carmenza Valencia-Trujillo and Sheryl Wilkins ==
In January 2025, and while on bail for some of the offences committed on the London Underground, Levy raped a woman in a car park near the Tottenham High Road. His victim reported the incident to police, and told them where Levy resided, but she was not interviewed until after the killings. In March 2025, Levy killed Carmenza Valencia-Trujillo, a 53-year-old grandmother. Her body was found in the stairwell of a semi-derelict block of flats on the Aylesbury Estate in south-east London on 17 March, but police did not initially treat her death as murder. Levy was arrested as a suspect on 1 April, but released due to lack of evidence linking him to the death. Sheryl Wilkins, a 39-year-old mother-of-four, was killed in August 2025, a day short of her 40th birthday. Her remains were found on 24 August, behind a wall at the same car park where Levy had committed the offence in January.

Police used face-recognition technology to match CCTV images of Levy, and he was arrested on suspicion of murder on 5 September 2025. Detectives then examined several hundred hours of CCTV footage to track Levy's movements, while Wilkins' DNA was found on a jacket belonging to him. In September 2025, Levy was charged with the murder of Wilkins, as well as the rape committed in January, and remanded in custody. He was charged with the second murder, that of Valencia-Trujillo, in November. In February 2026, and following a trial for a number of previous assaults, he was convicted of 10 assaults against women on the London Underground, as well as the 2022 assault against the prison officer. At a hearing at Inner London Crown Court on 16 June, he was sentenced to six years in prison, along with a further three years of supervision following release. Details of this trial were not made public until after his murder conviction later that year.

== Trial and conviction ==
Levy's trial for the two murders, as well as for the rape of the surviving victim, opened at the Old Bailey in June 2026, and was presided over by Judge Mark Lucraft KC. The case was prosecuted by Tom Little KC, and defended by Siobhan Grey KC. Levy pleaded not guilty to the two counts of murder, as well as two counts of rape, grievous bodily harm with intent, and non-fatal suffocation against his surviving victim. He declined to give evidence. The trial was told that Levy targeted the three women, who were all street sex workers attempting to support drug habits, and that both murder victims were suffocated in sexually motivated attacks. The court also heard that the surviving victim, who had been trafficked to the UK, was attacked after asking Levy for payment following sexual intercourse. It was said Levy had offered to take her for a drink and dinner, then attacked her with such force that she sustained a broken clavicle, and was left unconscious and for dead. It was also said that DNA evidence linked Levy to the killing of Valencia-Trujillo, while CCTV footage showed Levy and Wilkins together at the car park, before they disappeared behind the wall. Levy admitted he had sex with all three women, but said that he did not harm them. On 7 August, and following a 13-hour deliberation, the jury convicted Levy on all counts. Judge Lucraft adjourned sentence until 12 August, and remanded Levy in custody.

On 12 August, Levy was sentenced to a whole-life order for the killings, meaning he will never be eligible for parole. He was additionally sentenced to two life sentences for the rapes, which would run alongside the whole-life term, as well as four years for GBH and two-and-a-half years for intentional smothering. Passing sentence, Lucraft told Levy "You are clearly someone who ruthlessly exploits others for your own personal sexual satisfaction", and described him as "someone who appears to have a morbid fascination with sex, rape, and crime".

== Post-conviction events ==
Following Levy's conviction, the Metropolitan Police said that it believed Wilkins' death could have been prevented, and said it had apologised to her family. Metropolitan Police Deputy Chief Commissioner Kevin Southward described the handling of the case as a "collective system failure". Detective Chief Superintendent Pete Fulton of British Transport Police said the delay in their enquiries "absolutely wasn't good enough". The Crown Prosecution Service apologised for "shortcomings" in having Levy remanded in custody. The Independent Office for Police Conduct also launched an investigation into the handling of the case.
