= Campden tablet =

Alcohol sterilization method

Campden tablets (potassium or sodium metabisulfite) are a sulfur-based product that are used primarily to stabilize wine, cider and in beer making to kill bacteria and to inhibit the growth of most wild yeast. They are also used to eliminate both free chlorine and the more stable form, chloramine, from water solutions (e.g., drinking water from municipal sources). Campden tablets allow the amateur brewer to easily measure small quantities of sodium metabisulfite, so they can be used to protect against wild yeast and bacteria without affecting flavour. Untreated cider must frequently suffers from acetobacter contamination causing vinegar spoilage. Yeasts are resistant to the tablets but the acetobacter are easily killed off, hence treatment is important in cider production.

In beer- and wine-making, one crushed Campden tablet is typically used per US gallon (3.8 L) of must or wort. This dosage contributes 67 pm sulfur dioxide to the wort, but the level of active sulfur dioxide diminishes rapidly as it reacts with chlorine and chloramine, and with aldehydes (particularly in wine). Therefore, the concentration of free sulfur dioxide is greatly diminished by the time the beer or wine is consumed. When used to dechlorinate tap water, one tablet will effectively treat 20 US gallons (75 L) of water. Campden tablets are also used as an anti-oxidizing agent when transferring wine between containers. The sodium metabisulfite in the Campden tablets will trap oxygen that enters the wine, preventing it from doing any harm.

It is a common misconception that Campden tablets can be used to halt the ferment process in wine before all the available sugars are converted by the yeast, hence controlling the amount of residual sweetness in the final product. In order to halt fermentation, the number of Campden tablets needed would render the wine undrinkable. Alternatively, when used in conjunction with potassium sorbate, the yeast population will be greatly reduced and prevented from reproducing. Without the addition of potassium sorbate the yeast population will only be stunned and eventually repopulate if provided with enough fermentable sugars.

A typical Campden tablet contains 0.44 g of sodium metabisulfite, plus filler; eight of these are equivalent to one-half level teaspoon (2.5 mL) of sodium metabisulfite. Other Campden tablet formulations use potassium metabisulfite. Both are referred to, interchangeably, as sulfites, and the 'bi' can be found as 'di'. The related sodium thiosulfate also dechlorinates water.

Campden tablets are also useful for decontamination and neutralization after exposure to tear gas. The molar mass (commonly called molecular weight or MW) of potassium metabisulfite is 222 g/mol, and that of sodium metabisulfite is 190 g/mol.

== History ==
The name Campden tablet comes from the town of Chipping Campden in Gloucestershire, England, where the original solution was developed in the 1920s by the Fruit and Vegetable Preserving Research Station, now Campden BRI. The idea was then taken up by the Boots Co., which developed the tablet.

== Health effects ==
Some people have allergies or intolerance to sulfites. Allergies are less common than intolerance, but in rare cases may cause life-threatening anaphylactic reaction. Products containing residual amounts of sulfites, including potassium metabisulfite and sodium metabisulfite, should be labelled.
