= Jimmy Moody =

Armed robber, contract killer and prison escapee

- Born: James Alfred Moody; 27 February 1941; Looe, Cornwall, England
- Died: 1 June 1993 (aged 52); Royal Hotel, Hackney, London, England
- Other names: Mick, Big Jim
- Occupation(s): Gangster, hitman

James Alfred Moody (27 February 1941 – 1 June 1993) was an English gangster and hitman whose career spanned more than four decades and included run-ins with Jack Spot, Billy Hill, Frankie Fraser, the Krays, the Richardsons and the Provisional IRA. Described by police detectives as "extremely professional" and "extremely intimidating", Moody's speciality was robbing armoured trucks and he used a chainsaw to saw through the side of security vehicles.

Moody was born to a mother who was a wartime evacuee from Camberwell, London. His father was killed during World War II after his ship was torpedoed by a German U-boat. Moody was an enforcer for the Richardsons and did freelance "work" for the Krays. He was considered by many of his peers to be "the hardest man in London". In the 1970s, he joined a team of criminals to form the Chainsaw Gang who went on to become that decade's most successful group of armed robbers.

Moody was convicted, along with his brother Richard, of manslaughter in 1967 for the killing of William Day, a young merchant navy steward. He was released in 1972, but sent in 1979 on remand to Brixton Prison to await trial for armed robbery. His cellmate was Provisional IRA member Gerard Tuite. The two men and fellow-robber Stan Thompson escaped Brixton Prison on 16 December 1980, which put them to the top of Scotland Yard's most wanted list. It was alleged that Moody had been paid £10,000 by the IRA to help get Tuite out of prison.

Fleeing to Northern Ireland, Moody worked with the Provisional IRA. It was there that Moody coined the expression of "awarding someone an OBE" ("one behind the ear"; a shot in the head), a play on an OBE Award. The expression was reportedly used by killers in Belfast for the next decade or so. Tuite was later arrested in Dublin.

Still on the run, Moody returned to London in the late 1980s where he was now known as "Mick the Irishman". Now he was also wanted by the Royal Ulster Constabulary and the British security services. He was shot dead on 1 June 1993 in the Royal Hotel (now Royal Inn on the Park) in Hackney, East London by an unknown assailant, who was described as being in his late forties and wearing a leather bomber jacket. The assailant fled in a stolen Ford Fiesta.

Following his death, Moody was linked to multiple unsolved murders including that of gangster David Brindle in August 1991, of businessman Terry Gooderham and his girlfriend Maxine Arnold in Epping Forest, and that of a couple, the Dixons, walking the Pembrokeshire coast in June 1989 who were thought to have inadvertently unearthed a cache of Provisional IRA weapons. There was speculation that he was involved in the murder of car dealer Nick Whiting, found in Rainham, Essex, in 1990.

However, Pembrokeshire-based serial killer and rapist John Cooper was found guilty of the murder of the Dixons in May 2011. The police were unable to establish what Moody had been doing since his return to England, nor who had arranged a council flat for him. His flat was only traced three weeks after his death, by which time it had been emptied.

== Sources ==
- Clarkson, Wensley, Moody. Mainstream Publishing. London; ISBN 1-84018-744-1
- "Telegraph.co.uk - Telegraph online". telegraph.co.uk. 25 March 1997. Archived from the original on 17 May 2003.
