= HM Prison Brixton =

Men's prison in south London

HMP Brixton
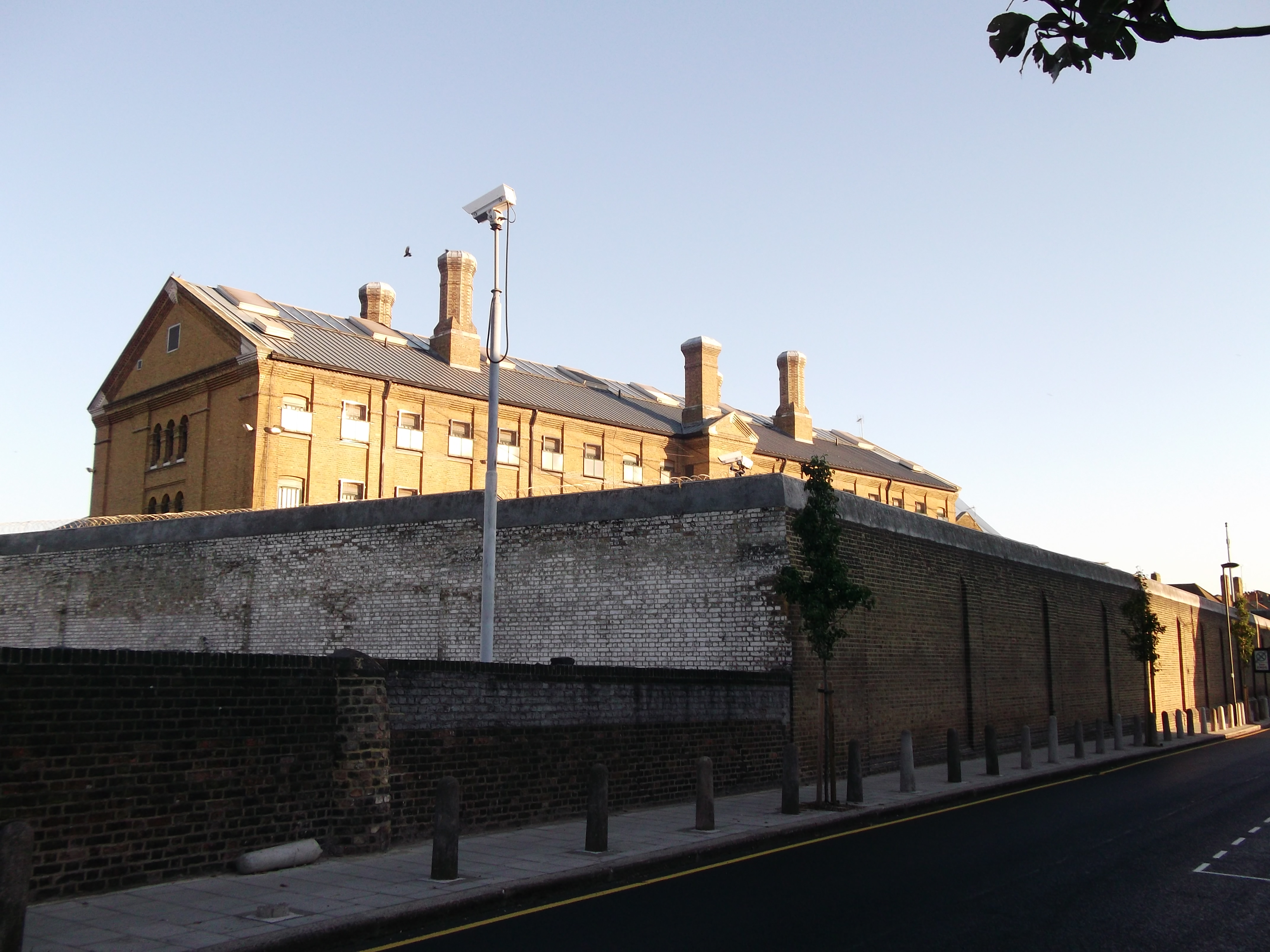
- Interactive map of HMP Brixton
- Location: Brixton, London, SW2; 51°27′05.8″N 00°07′30.9″W
- Security class: Adult Male/Resettlement
- Population: 798 (August 2008)
- Opened: 1820; 206 years ago
- Managed by: HM Prison Services
- Governor: Mia Wheeler
- Website: Brixton at justice.gov.uk

HM Prison Brixton is a Category C training establishment men's prison, located in Brixton area of the London Borough of Lambeth, in inner-South London. The prison is operated by His Majesty's Prison Service. Before 2012, it was used as a local prison.

== History ==
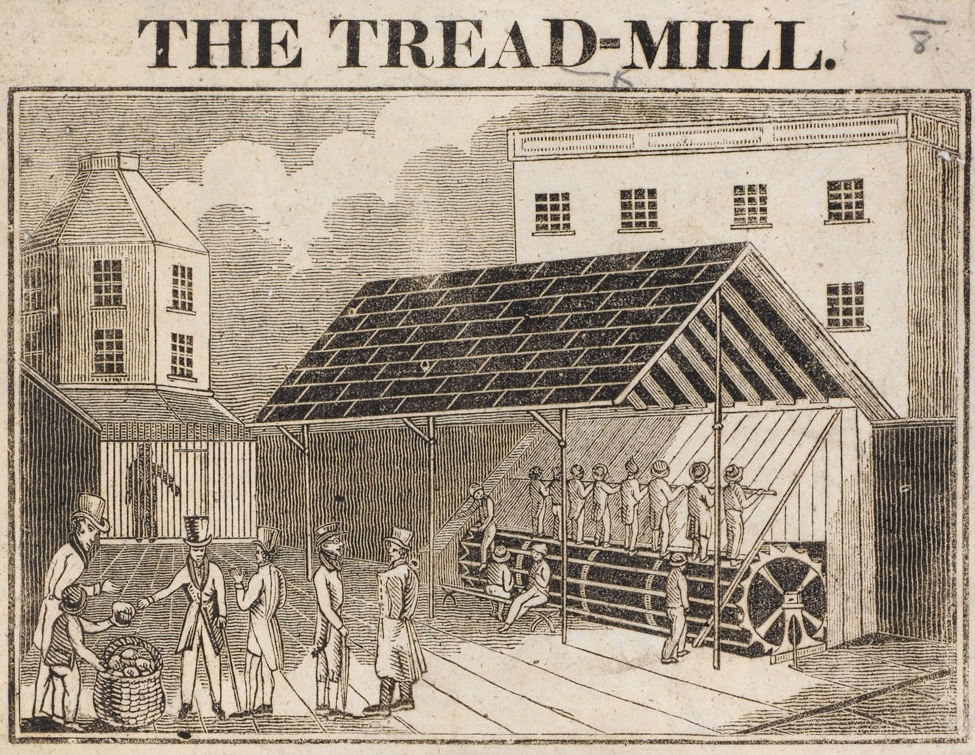
Treadmill at Brixton Prison in London designed by William Cubitt, c1817

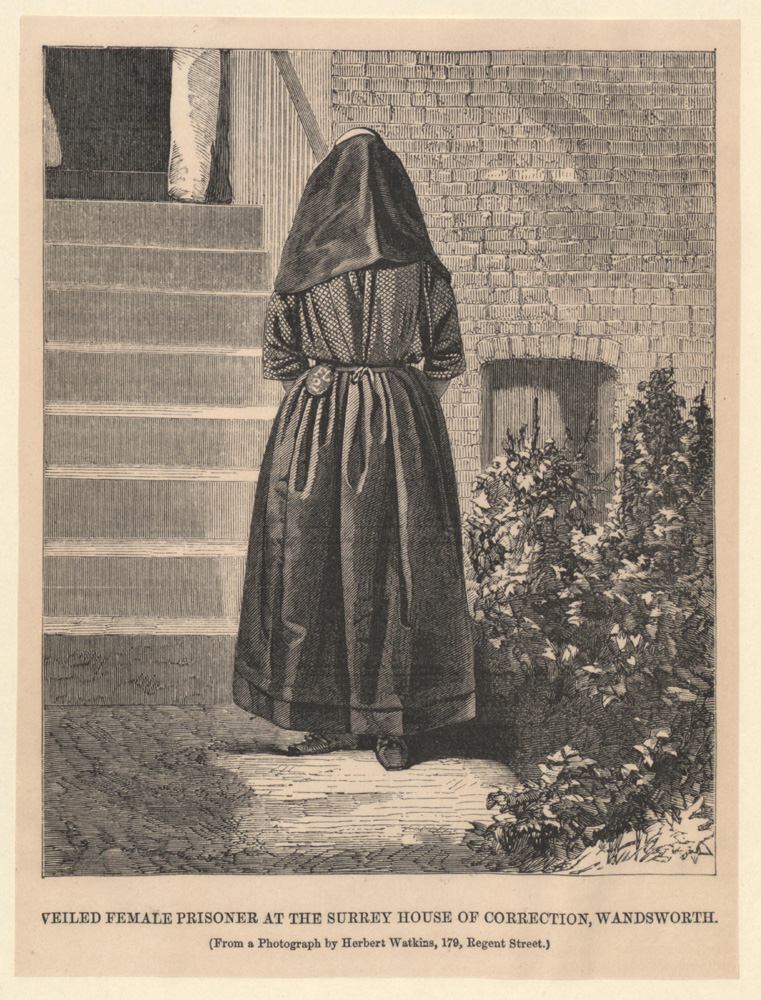
Female prisoner at the Surrey House of Correction in the 1860s

The prison was originally built in 1820 and opened as the Surrey House of Correction, Brixton Prison was intended to house 175 prisoners. However, by regularly exceeding its capacity and containing over 200 prisoners, overcrowding was an early problem which, along with its small cells and poor living conditions, contributed to its reputation as one of the worst prisons in London, which was worsened when Brixton became one of the first prisons to introduce penal treadmills in 1821. There is an illustration of prisoners on the 1821 treadmill used to mill corn in Surrey House of Correction.

Conditions for women were especially harsh as newly arrived female inmates were made to spend four months in solitary confinement and, following their introduction into the general prison population, would be required to maintain a condition of silent association. Female inmates were allowed over time to earn privileges, which included limited conversation, payment for labour, the right to receive letters and visitation rights.

Eventually the problem of overcrowding was addressed, with the prison expanding to house over 800 prisoners and, in 1852, the British government converted Brixton into a women's correctional facility after Van Diemen's Land (modern day Tasmania) became the final colony to refuse to accept women prisoners from England, under the penal transportation process.

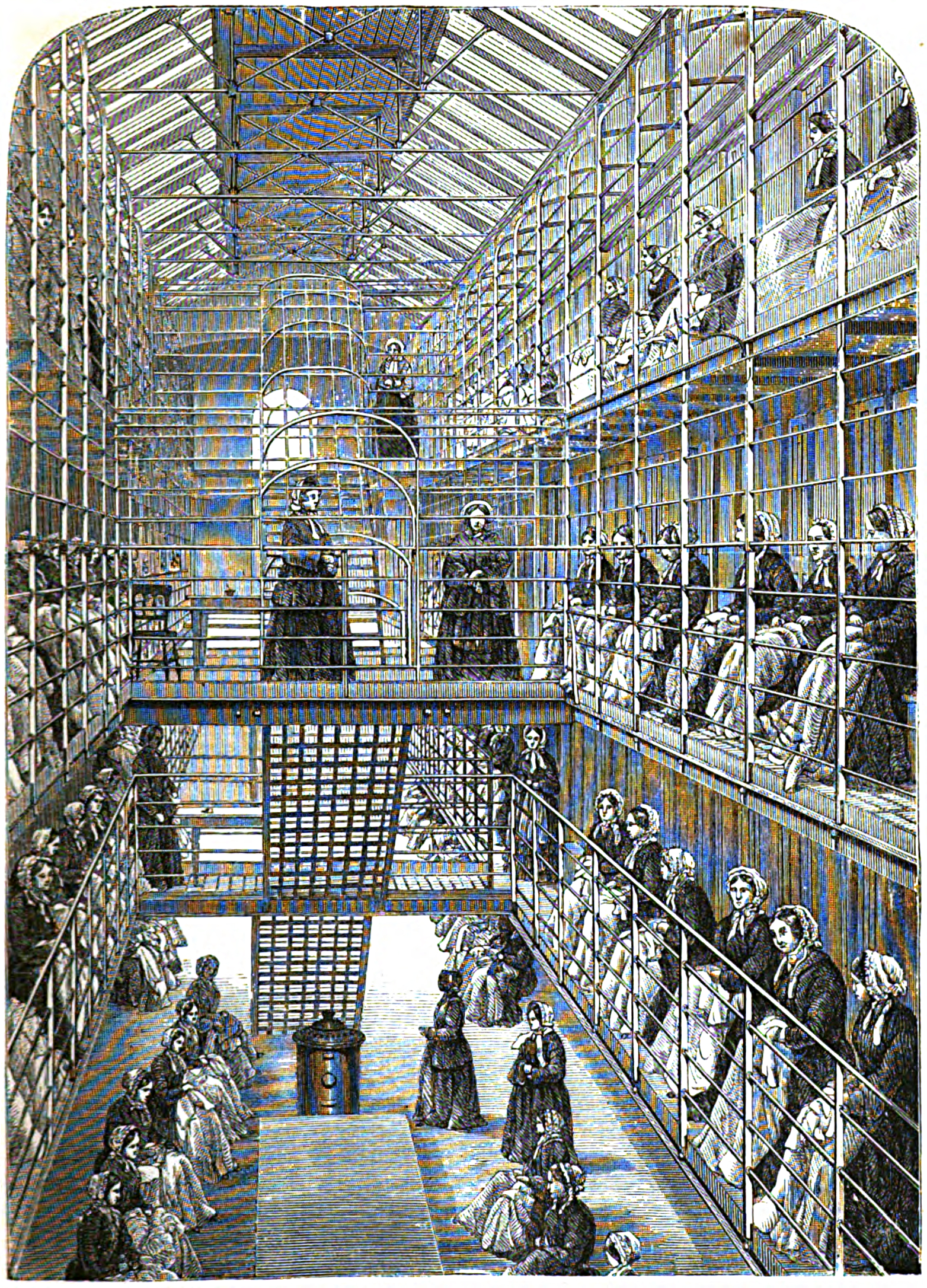
Brixton Women's Prison in 1862

Conditions in the prison gradually improved during the mid-19th century as a nursery was opened in the prison for children under the age of four and by 1860 inmates were allowed to keep their children with them until the end of their prison sentences. Brixton became a military prison from 1882 until 1898 and then became a trial-and-remand prison for London and the Home Counties until 2012. The footings for the treadmill remain visible and the former condemned cell is now an enlarged cell with six beds. A 1902 photograph shows the newly-built execution shed, which was never used and was repurposed as a staff gym.

On 7 July 1991 two Provisional IRA prisoners, Pearse McAuley and Nessan Quinlivan, escaped from the prison by subduing a guard. They managed to scale the walls and hijack the car of a passing member of the public before reaching the Baker Street Underground station. They managed to flee to Ireland.

=== Recent history ===
In October 1999, Prisons Minister Paul Boateng had to make an emergency visit to Brixton Prison after a spate of multiple suicide attempts by inmates being held in its medical wards. The minister subsequently promised more nurses and staff for the unit. A month later, Boateng threatened to privatise Brixton Prison if improvements were not made by management to the regime and conditions. In the spring of 2000 a surprise inspection by HM Inspectorate of Prisons resulted in the Director of the Prison Service being summoned to see the appalling conditions in which prisoners with mental health issues were being kept. The governor was removed the same day, only to be reappointed to run HM Prison Downview a few weeks later. It was also noted that cell call buzzers had been sabotaged by prison officers so as not to be disturbed during their shifts, only a small light remaining operational to indicate activation of a cell emergency call. In August 2000, prison officers from all over the UK staged an illegal strike after the government released proposals confirming its intentions to privatise Brixton Prison. The privatisation plans were subsequently dropped, and Brixton Prison has remained in the public sector.

In January 2001, an inspection report from the Chief Inspector of Prisons severely criticised conditions at the prison. The report claimed that staff had falsified records and tried to sabotage the inspection. Standards of healthcare and race relations within the prison were also criticised.

In June 2004, a further inspection report praised the prison for improving standards. The report highlighted the prisons good staff-prisoner relations and improved support for new prisoners. However, inspectors highlighted overcrowding as a major issue that was hampering further improvements at the jail. Another inspection report in July 2006 stated that poor facilities were holding back improvements. The prison's kitchens, healthcare and sports facilities were highlighted as being particularly inadequate.

In October 2008, the Chief Inspector of Prisons warned that many inmates held at the prison were taking drugs, and this was leading to violent attacks amongst inmate gangs. The inspector also stated that the prison was infested with vermin.

A further inspection was carried out in 2014. The report stated that conditions had improved although there were still concerns regarding levels of violence, incidents of self-harm, overcrowding and offender management.

== The prison today ==
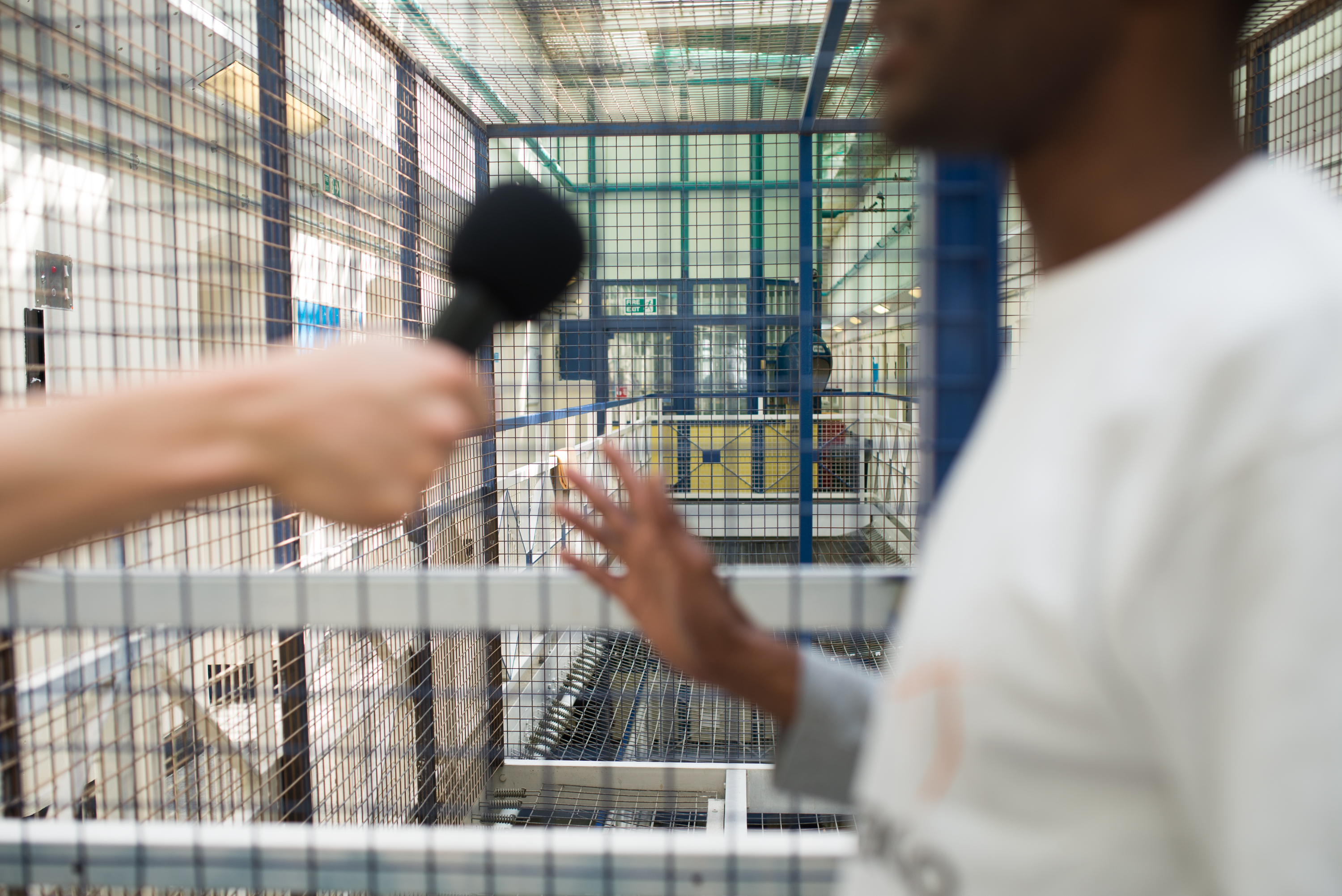
A radio interview recording in HMP Brixton

HMP Brixton no longer acts as a local prison, having been changed to a Category C training establishment in 2012. Accommodation at Brixton comprises four main residential units, plus a health care unit. A new kitchen has been built and plans are in discussion to replace the reception, healthcare, and sports complex.

Inmates can pursue a range of education courses at the learning and skills centre. These courses include information technology, English, maths, social and life skills and a varied art programme. Most courses lead to nationally recognised qualifications. The gym also offers physical education and accredited programmes. The Windmill Centre is a traditional workshop located where the old kitchens were.

The Family and Visitor's Centre at Brixton is run by the Prison Advice & Care Trust (pact), an independent charity.

HMP Brixton is no longer the remand prison for Southwark Crown Court. This is now the job of HMP Wandsworth. Nor does it temporarily lodge prisoners appearing at the Court of Appeal Criminal Division (COACD) held at the Royal Courts of Justice (RCJ). That is now done at HMP Pentonville.

HMP Brixton was the setting of Gordon Ramsay's 2012 British television series Gordon Behind Bars, where he teaches a brigade of 12 inmates to cook, cater and, after the first four weeks, give back to society by selling on the produce. It was shown on Channel 4 in June and July 2012.

== Notable former inmates ==
- Bertrand Russell, philosopher, mathematician and advocate of social reform
- Terence MacSwiney, former Lord Mayor of Cork. MacSwiney subsequently went on hunger strike and died at the prison.
- Roger Casement, civil rights investigator, diplomat, Irish nationalist
- Oswald Mosley, Barry Domvile, Neil Francis Hawkins, Archibald Maule Ramsay and Alexander Raven Thomson, fascists interned in 1940 under Defence Regulation 18B
- George Lansbury, a Socialist politician and eventual leader of the Labour Party
- Brian Behan, a trade unionist
- Simon Dee, a television interviewer and radio disc jockey
- Gerard Tuite, formerly a senior member of the Provisional IRA escaped from Brixton in 1980
- Jimmy Moody, a gangster and hitman escaped with Tuite in 1980.
- Nessan Quinlivan and Pearse McAuley, suspected members of the Provisional IRA escaped from Brixton in 1991
- Cahir Healy M.P. Irish nationalist,
- Dolours Price and Marian Price, sisters, Irish nationalists.
- Mick Jagger, singer from the Rolling Stones.
- Bertrand Gachot, former Formula One driver.
- Hugh Hambleton, Professor at Université Laval, Quebec City
- Giggs, rapper from Peckham.
- Udham Singh, assassinated Sir Michael Francis O'Dwyer (13 March 1940), to avenge the Amritsar Massacre.
- The Kray twins, remanded in Brixton from late 1968 to early 1969, when they were convicted.
- Denis MacShane
- Glenn Danzig and Bobby Steele of punk rock band The Misfits spent two nights in the prison following a street fight. They wrote and recorded the song 'London Dungeon' about the experience.
- Imran Ahmad Khan, former MP.
- Stephen Bear, reality TV star
- Simon Levy, murdered two women, raped another and committed various other sex offences.
