= John George Macleod =

Scottish physician and writer of medical textbooks

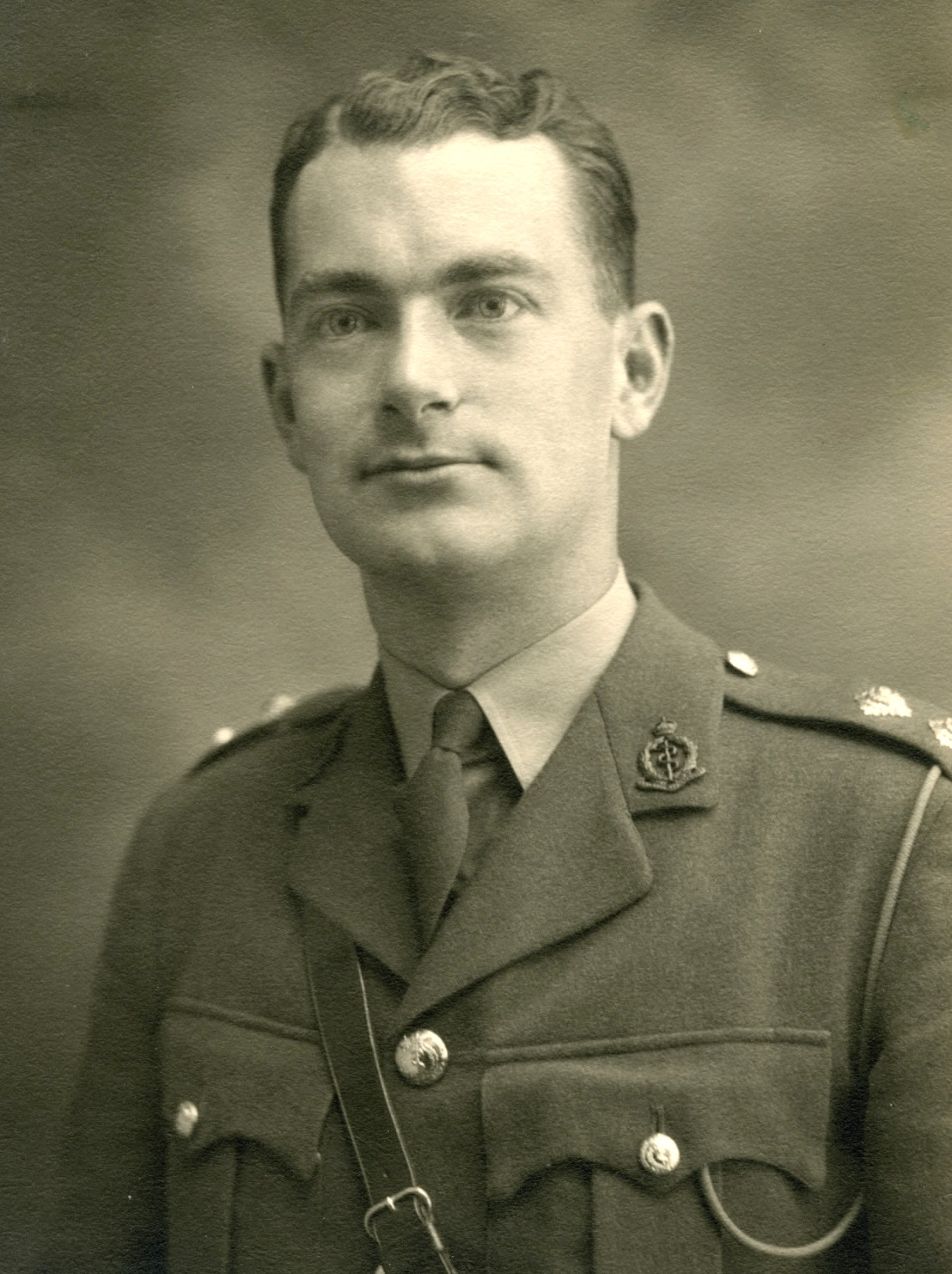
- Born: 8 May 1915
- Died: 4 April 2006 (aged 90)
- Education: University of Edinburgh
- Occupation: Physician

John George Macleod (8 May 1915 in Kirkhill – 4 April 2006 in Edinburgh) was a Scottish physician and a writer of medical textbooks.

== Family ==
Macleod was the elder brother of Professor Dr Anna MacGillivray Macleod, the world famous professor of Brewing at Heriot-Watt University in Edinburgh. His younger brother was Dr Alasdair MacGillivray Macleod, a general practitioner in Linlithgow. He was the son of Margaret Ingram Sangster, MA, and Rev. Alasdair MacGillivray Macleod, who both graduated in 1914 at Aberdeen University. He was the grandson of Rev. George Macleod of Garrabost, Isle of Lewis and Anna MacGillivray of Greenock, Renfrewshire. He was second cousin to the Right Hon. Iain Norman Macleod, who served as Chancellor of the Exchequer in 1970. This branch of the Macleods of Pabbay and Uig belongs to the family of the Chiefs of MacLeod of Lewis.

On 21 December 1942, John George Macleod married in Edinburgh Nancie Elizabeth Clark. Their issue are two sons, Peter John Macleod, married Braid Church, Edinburgh 1966 Geraldine Finlay, who both died in 2022 and Keith Roderick Macleod, who died in 2010 and married Yvonne Ann Hay. In addition to the two sons, they also had one daughter, Gillian Lesley Macleod, born Edinburgh 18 Oct.1945, who married Edinburgh 7 Dec. 1968 at Magdalen Chapel, Cowgate, Edinburgh and a reception afterwards at Prestonfield House, Edinburgh Gerard Willem Charles Lemmens, born Surabaya, Dutch East Indies, 24 April 1940, B.Sc.in Trop Agr. 1963, Knight in the Order of the Hop 2007, they live in Wadhurst, East Sussex and have two sons (Michael Adriaan McGillivray Lemmens and Hamish Johan Lemmens) and one daughter (Claire-Louise Catharine Lemmens. who is married to Dr. Jon Symonds).

== Education and career ==
Macleod was educated at George Watson's College and studied medicine at the University of Edinburgh, where he graduated in 1938. During the Second World War, from 1939 to 1945, he was a major in the army at the Royal Army Medical Corps. In 1941, he obtained a post at the University of Edinburgh and, in 1947, was asked to become a member of the Royal College of Physicians of Edinburgh. In 1950, he became a consultant physician at Edinburgh's Western General Hospital.

== Medical textbook ==
In 1964, Macleod wrote the medical handbook Clinical Examination (later renamed Macleod's Clinical Examination), which is still (in 2023) in print in its 19th Edition and has sold worldwide over a million copies. In 1964, the physician Sir Stanley Davidson offered him the opportunity to update Davidson's Principles and Practice of Medicine, which sold more than two million copies worldwide and of which Macleod contributed to six editions.

These two textbooks played a crucial part in keeping Edinburgh on the world map of medicine and were translated into many languages such as Japanese and Russian. In 1971, he was appointed vice-chairman of the University Department of Medicine of the Western General Hospital. He died in Edinburgh in April 2006, aged 90.

== Personal note ==
He was interested in art and gave lectures on Art in Medicine with slides he had collected. He also was an enthusiastic supporter of the Traverse Theatre, and a keen gardener and garden designer. During State visits Macleod sometimes was the duty physician at Holyrood Palace and on one occasion received a gift from the French president Giscard D'Estaing ( a dish with his initials).
