= Norman Bryce Smiley =

English brewer (1909–1968)

Norman Bryce Smiley (30 March 1909 – 9 October 1968) was an English brewer and brewing executive who served as President of the Institute of Brewing.

== Life ==
Norman Bryce Smiley was born on 30 March 1909, the son of Thomas Bryce Smiley and Edith Ann née Bardsley. In 1936, he married Elsie Marion Steen, and they had two sons and two daughters. He was educated at Denstone College and New College, Oxford, whence he graduated with a degree in Natural Science. He became a brewer at Messrs. Arthur Guinness in 1931; he was transferred to the company's new brewery at Park Royal four years later, before he was appointed a Director in 1942. In 1956, he was promoted to Joint Managing Director of the Park Royal company which oversaw the brewery; ten years later he was appointed Deputy Managing Director of Arthur Guinness and the following year was promoted to full managing director.

Smiley served on several committees of the Brewers' Society, and was appointed to its Council in 1944. He was also Chairman of the Institute of Brewing's (IOB) Research Board from 1952 to 1962, and was involved with the development's Research Scheme and the inception of its research centre at Lyttel Hall. He was the British representative on the Council of the European Brewery Convention (EBC) from 1948 to his death; he served as vice-president of the EBC from 1963 to his death, and was the President of the IOB between 1966 and 1968. Other appointments included Membership of the Egg Marketing Board (from 1957) and Member of the Council of the Confederation of British Industry (from 1965). He died on 9 October 1968, and was survived by his wife.

== Likenesses ==
- Norman Bryce Smiley by Rex Coleman, for Baron Studios (5x4 inch film negative), 27 March 1963. National Portrait Gallery, London (Photographs Collection, NPG x191569; given by Godfrey Argent, 1999).

Preceded by Arthur Harold John Brook	President of the Institute of Brewing; 1966 – 1968	Succeeded by Clifford Furness Mackay
