= Ord Tidbury =

Brigadier Ord Tidbury MC
- Born: 10 December 1888
- Died: 14 July 1961 (aged 72)
- Military career
- Allegiance: United Kingdom
- Branch: British Army
- Service years: 1907–1944
- Rank: Brigadier
- Service number: 4096
- Unit: Middlesex Regiment
- Commands: 14th Infantry Brigade (1940–1941); 18th Infantry Brigade (1938–1940); 1st Battalion Middlesex Regiment (1936–1938)
- Conflicts: First World War; Arab revolt in Palestine; Second World War
- Awards: Military Cross; Mentioned in despatches (3); Officer of the Order of the Crown (Belgium); Knight of the Order of the Crown of Italy

Brigadier Ord Henderson Tidbury, MC (10 December 1888 – 14 July 1961) was a senior officer in the British Army.

== Early life and family ==
Ord Henderson Tidbury was born on December 10, 1888, the son of Lieutenant Colonel James Tidbury (died 1936), of North Bend, Woking in Surrey, an officer in the Royal Army Medical Corps, and his wife Agnes (died 1945), daughter of Robert Henderson of Glasgow and Leghorn. In 1924, he married Beryl Marjorie, only daughter of C. M. Pearce of Dundarach, Camberley (formerly of Calcutta), and had at least one son, Sir Charles Henderson Tidbury (1926–2003), who married Anne, daughter of Brigadier H. E. Russell. Beryl Tidbury was a founder of the Hong Kong Fellowship for supporting relatives of British prisoners of war; she died in 1955. Four years later, Ord Tidbury married Joan Windham, the daughter of Ashe Windham. After her husband's death, she married Major Hugh D'Oyly Lyle (died 1977), son of Colonel Thomas Lyle and a descendant of the D'Oyly baronets, and died in 1990.

== Military career ==
Tidbury was gazetted a second lieutenant in the Middlesex Regiment on October 9, 1907. Promotion to lieutenant followed on February 1, 1911, and he was a temporary captain between October 8 and December 10, 1914. The following day, he became a substantive captain. He was a staff captain in France between May 1915 and December 1916, before serving as deputy assistant adjutant, quartermaster general, and DAAG for France and Italy, which office he held until May 17, 1918. He was then posted as DAAG in France until January 19, 1920, when he transferred to the British Military Mission in Berlin as assistant quartermaster general. On June 3, 1918, he was promoted to brevet major, a rank he held until he was made a full major on May 5, 1927. Tidbury was twice wounded during the First World War; he was mentioned in dispatches three times, received the Belgian Order of the Crown (4th Class) and the Italian Order of the Crown (5th Class).

After his work in Germany, Tidbury was employed by the Foreign Office as part of the North Silesian Plebiscite Commission until 1922. He held various postings as a general staff officer between then and 1935 at the War Office and in Egypt. Promoted to brevet lieutenant colonel in July 1937, Tibury received the full rank on New Year's Day 1936 and exactly seven months later became a colonel. In these capacities, he commanded the 1st Battalion, Middlesex Regiment. On August 22, 1938, he was promoted to the temporary rank of brigadier and given command of the 18th Infantry Brigade, then serving in Mandatory Palestine during the Arab revolt. He held this post until 1940, and between 1940 and 1941 he commanded the British troops in Crete.

He died on July 14, 1961.
