= Nessan Quinlivan =

Provisional Irish Republican Army member

- Born: c. 1965 (age 60–61); Limerick, Ireland
- Military career
- Allegiance: Provisional Irish Republican Army
- Service years: 1983–1997
- Rank: Volunteer
- Conflict: The Troubles

Nessan Quinlivan (born c. 1965), is a former Provisional IRA member who escaped from Brixton Prison in London on 7 July 1991 along with his cellmate Pearse McAuley, while awaiting trial on charges relating to a suspected IRA plot to assassinate a former brewery company chairman, Sir Charles Tidbury.

In April 1993, he was arrested in the Republic of Ireland on firearms charges, and was sentenced to four years in prison. In November 1996, he was released from Portlaoise Prison as part of the Irish government's early release programme for republican prisoners.

In April 2000, the High Court stated that he should be extradited to Britain, to face charges of conspiracy to murder and to cause explosions as well as escaping from prison and wounding with intent. Quinlivan claimed that it would be pointless to extradite him, because under the terms of the Belfast Agreement, he would have had to be freed by July 2001.

In August 2009, the Crown Prosecution Service (CPS) in England and Wales announced it was no longer seeking the extradition of Quinlivan and McAuley.

His brother Maurice is a Sinn Féin TD for Limerick City. In early 2009, the arrest of three women, who were running a brothel in an apartment Nessan Quinlivan owned and was leasing to them, triggered a series of events that led to the resignation of the Minister for Defence, Willie O'Dea.
