= Francis Northey Richardson =

Lieutenant-Colonel Francis Northey Richardson, OBE, TD, JP (1894 – 29 January 1983) was an English Canadian soldier and brewing executive, who served as President of the Institute of Brewing.

== Life ==
Francis Northey Richardson was born in 1894, the son of F. Richardson, of Penticton in British Columbia. His family had emigrated to Canada, but Richardson was educated at Harrow (1908–12), before attending the University of British Columbia. He volunteered for the Canadian Army in 1914, and automatically became a Canadian citizen in the process; he fought with the country's forces in Europe during World War I as a gunner, before receiving a field commission; he was mentioned in dispatches twice and received the Territorial Decoration.

With the war over, in 1919 Richardson joined the hop merchants Wigan Richardson & Company, where two of his uncles worked; he remained connected with the firm for over fifty years, eventually as a consultant. In 1925, he was elected to the Executive Committee of the Allied Brewery Traders Association, and remained on it until 1971. In 1931, he was elected its Chair and actively opposed proposals to increase beer tax; he was asked to continue as chair into 1932. Richardson was also chairman of the Hop Merchants Association and in 1936, he joined the London Section of the Institute of Brewing. His career was interrupted by the Second World War, when, having remained in the Territorial Army after 1918, he was called up as a Lieutenant-Colonel commanding a gunnery regiment in Iceland. He subsequently led a training regiment in Cromer. With the war over, he served as the IOB London Section's Chairman between 1954 and 1955. Having also been a member of its Hop Advisory Committee since 1959 (he served on the committee until 1981), he was elected President of the IOB from 1962 to 1964.

Outside of Brewing, Richardson was active in local politics. He chaired the Southwark Conservative Association, was comptroller of Southwark Cathedral, carried out work with various charities, and served as a justice of the peace. He was appointed an Officer of the Order of the British Empire in recognition of his "public and political service" in 1963. He died on 29 January 1983.

| Preceded by John Gretton, 2nd Baron Gretton | President of the Institute of Brewing; 1962 – 1964 | Succeeded by Arthur Harold John Brook |
