= John Simpson Ford =

Scottish industrial chemist and microbiologist

John Simpson Ford FRSE (1866-17 March 1944) was a Scottish industrial chemist and microbiologist specialising in brewing who served as Technical Director of William Younger & Co. Scottish candidates for a Diploma in Brewing may apply for the J S Ford Award which is named in his honour.

== Life ==
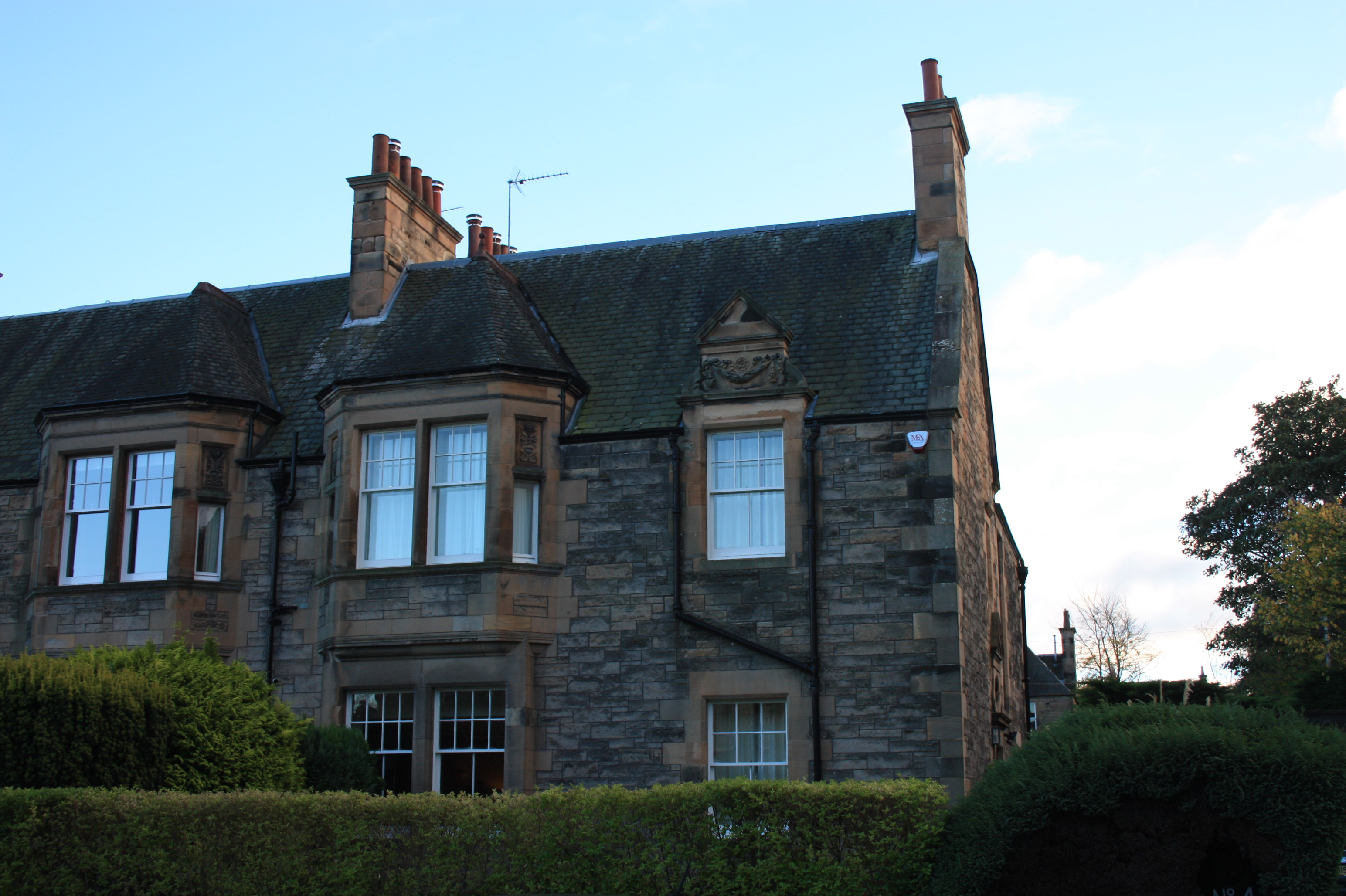
4 Nile Grove, Edinburgh

He was born in Edinburgh in 1866. He studied at the Roya High School then was articled as an apprentice in 1880 under the Public Analyst, Falconer King. He then studied medicine at the University of Edinburgh but having won the Chemistry Medal (the Hope Prize) for his year (chemistry forming part of the medical course) was inspired to concentrate on chemistry instead. This was also partly inspired by the quality of his professor, Alexander Crum Brown.

Following graduation, in 1889 he was employed as a chemist by the brewer William Younger & Co. He remained with the firm for 55 years. During his time in the firm he made an important trip to Denmark to study Danish brewing techniques with Johan Kjeldahl and introduced the Kjeldahl method into British brewing. He also met Emil Christian Hansen and from him introduced new techniques in the use of yeast in beer. He independently worked out the importance of stabilisers and the impact of impurities such as copper or salt leaching during the process. He served as Vice President of the Institute of Brewing.

In 1892 he was elected a Fellow of the Royal Society of Edinburgh. His proposers were Prof Alexander Crum Brown, Hugh Marshall, Leonard Dobbin and John Gibson. He was winner of the Horace Brown Medal.

In the early 20th century he lived at 4 Nile Grove in the Morningside district of southern Edinburgh. He died in Edinburgh on 17 March 1944 (some sources state 27 March).
