= Maurice Arthur Pryor =

Maurice Arthur Pryor (23 June 1911 – 20 December 1969) was an English brewing executive who served as President of the Institute of Brewing.

== Life ==
Pryor was born on 23 June 1911, the son of John Arthur Pryor. In 1935 he married Veronica Beatrice. They had one son and three daughters.

Following schooling at Stowe, he joined Truman, Hanbury, Buxton & Co. as a director in 1934, a brewery which had merged with the Pryor family brewery in 1816 and where his father was on the board. His career was interrupted by the Second World War, when he joined the Royal Navy Volunteer Reserve. He became a Lieutenant Commander in 1940, serving in Light Coastal forces. After he was demobilised, he returned to his old brewery as a member of the board; in 1964 he succeeded his father (who had been in the post for 19 years) as Chairman. Alongside that post, he was chairman of Daniell & Sons Breweries, Ltd., Haven Inns Ltd., Russell’s Gravesend Brewery Ltd. and The Writtle Brewery Co. Ltd., alongside other directorships.

Pryor was a member for 28 years of the Institute of Brewing, where he was on the Research Board and the Research Policy Committee, and was President between 1958 and 1960. He was also Chairman of the Brewers' Society between 1962–64 and Master of the Brewers' Company in 1962, chairing the three leading professional organisations for the brewing industry.

== Likenesses ==
- Maurice Arthur Pryor by Rex Coleman, for Baron Studios (5 x 4 inch film negative), 25 November 1963. National Portrait Gallery, London (Photographs Collection, NPG x191766. Given by Godfrey Argent, 1999).

| Preceded by George Mesnard Parsons | President of the Institute of Brewing; 1958 – 1960 | Succeeded by Lord Gretton |
| Preceded by Sanders Watney | Master of the Brewers' Company; 1962 | Succeeded by F. O. A. G. Bennett |
