= Stanley Davidson =

British physician, medical investigator and author

Sir Stanley Davidson
- Born: 3 March 1894; Sri Lanka
- Died: 27 September 1981 (aged 87); Colinton, Edinburgh
- Education: Trinity College, Cambridge (BA); University of Edinburgh (MB ChB, MD)
- Scientific career
- Fields: Medicine, Medical Rheumatology
- Workplaces: University of Aberdeen, Royal College of Physicians of Edinburgh, Royal Infirmary of Edinburgh

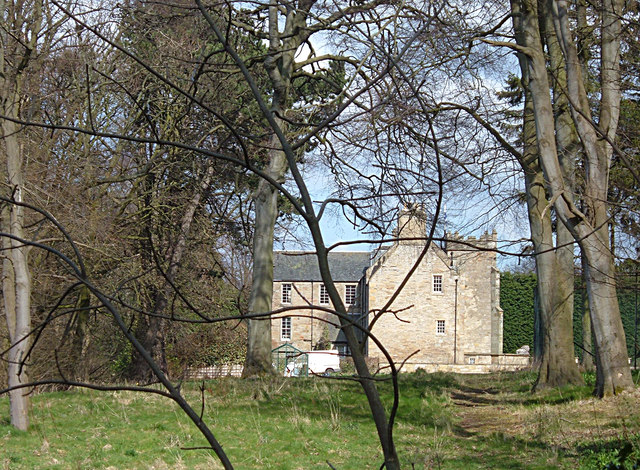
Davidson's home: Woodhall House

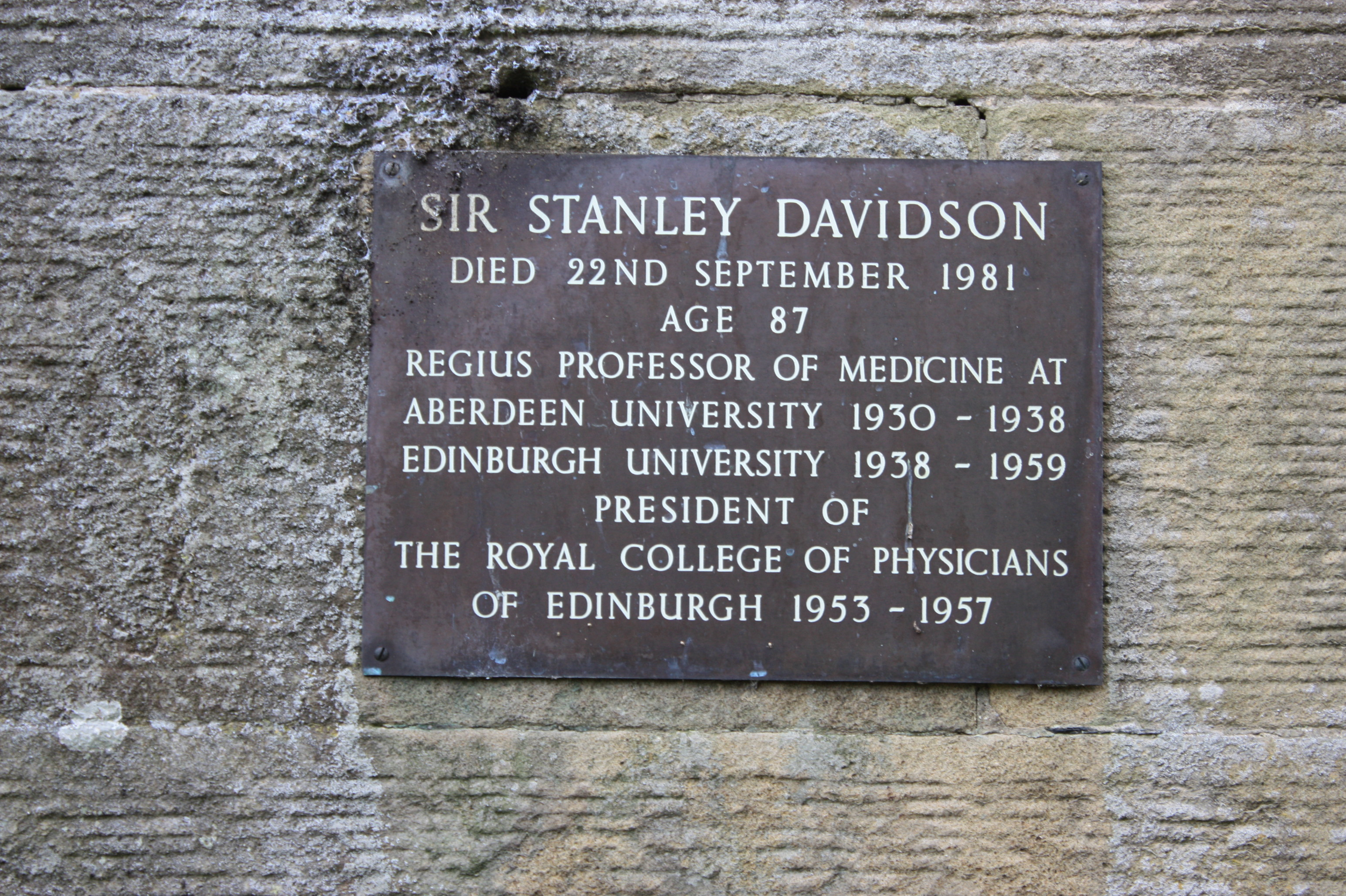
The grave of Sir Stanley Davidson, Currie Churchyard, Edinburgh

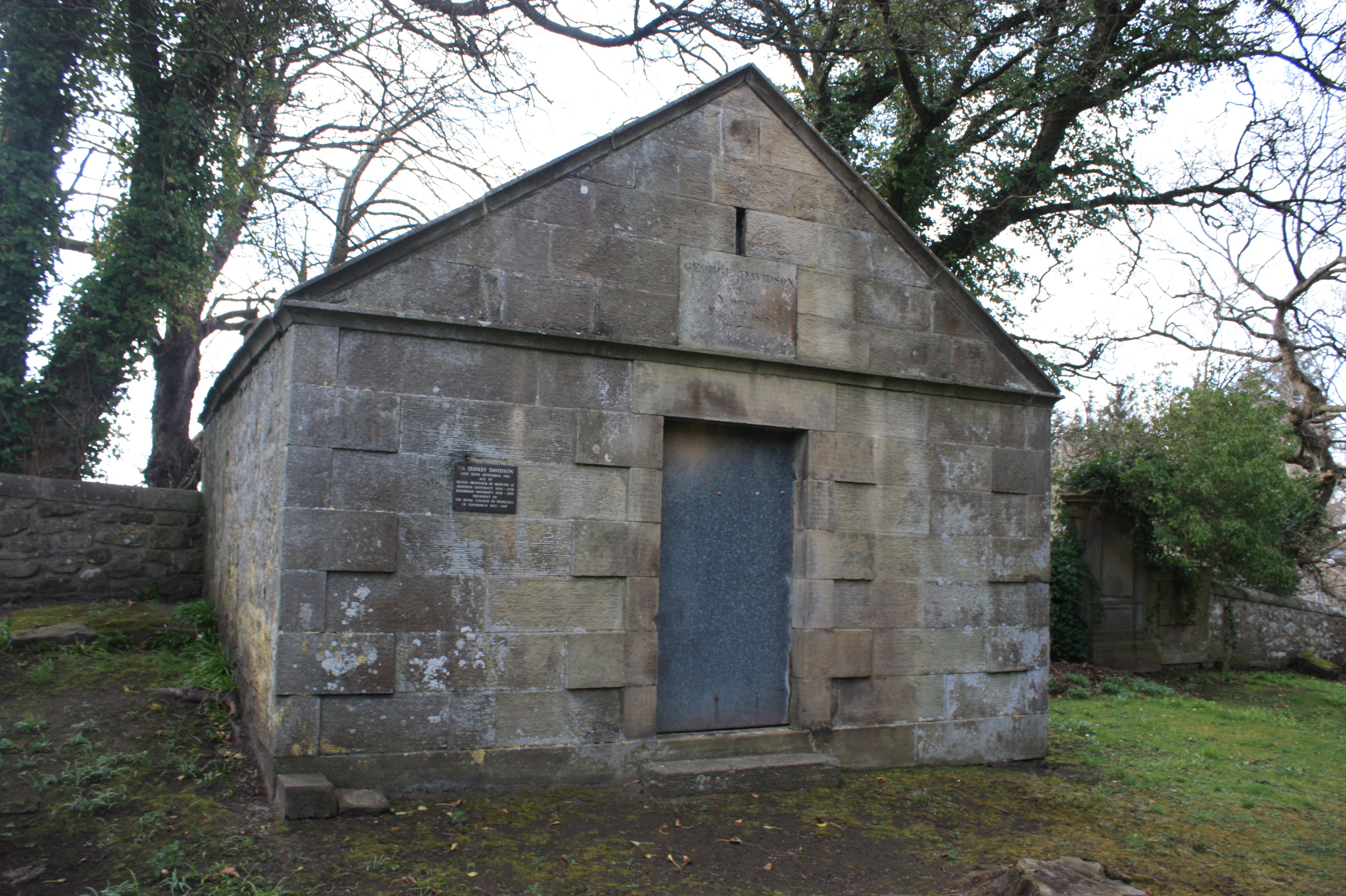
The Davidson vault, Currie churchyard, Edinburgh

Sir Leybourne Stanley Patrick Davidson (3 March 1894 – 27 September 1981) was a British physician, medical investigator and author who wrote the medical textbook Principles and Practice of Medicine, which was first published in 1952.

== Early life and career ==
Davidson was born on 3 March 1894 in Sri Lanka (then known as Ceylon), to Sir Leybourne Francis Watson Davidson and Jane Rosalind Dudgeon Davidson. He had his education at Cheltenham College, England and later at Trinity College, Cambridge, where he began his undergraduate medical education, graduating BA.

At the onset of World War I in 1914, he enlisted in the Gordon Highlanders, and his medical education was interrupted. He was seriously wounded in the war in 1915 while he was fighting in France, and spent the next two years recovering. He then resumed his medical studies at the University of Edinburgh and in 1919 graduated MB ChB with first class honours. He then worked as a house physician at Leith Hospital.

He became a Member of the Royal College of Physicians of Edinburgh in 1921 (proceeding to the Fellowship in 1926), graduated and awarded a Gold Medal for his M.D. thesis on immunisation and antibody reactions in 1925.
In 1928, he was appointed as assistant physician to the Royal Infirmary of Edinburgh. He then was appointed as Professor of Medicine at the University of Aberdeen in 1930, which was one of the first full-time Chairs of Medicine anywhere and the first in Scotland. While working there, he spent his time in hospital work, teaching and research, not preferring private practice. In 1930 he was elected a member of the Harveian Society of Edinburgh.

He was elected a Fellow of the Royal Society of Edinburgh in 1932. His proposers were Arthur Logan Turner, James Ritchie, Thomas Jones Mackie and William Thomas Ritchie.

In 1938, he was given the Chair of Medicine at the University of Edinburgh, in which he remained until he retired in 1959. He was elected to the Aesculapian Club in 1951. He was also the President of the Royal College of Physicians of Edinburgh from 1953 to 1957, and the President of The Association of Physicians of Great Britain and Ireland in 1957. He played an important role in upgrading, modernising and broadening the hospital teaching facilities within Edinburgh area.

== Teaching ==
Davidson taught that "everything had to be questioned and explained". While at the University of Edinburgh, he himself gave most of the systematic lectures in Medicine and also made his lectures notes available to students as typewritten notes. It was these notes which formed the basis of the textbook, "Principles and Practices of Medicine", that he published in 1952. Doctors he has been a teacher to include John George Macleod, Professor Ronald Haxton Girdwood who discovered the link between folate deficiency and Megaloblastic anemia, Sir John McMichael, a pioneer in the field of Cardiology whose works formed the basis of the treatment of cardiac diseases in Britain, and Harold Thomas Swan, who discovered and published two case-notes recording the successful clinical use of penicillin in 1930.

== Research works ==
Davidson was a member of the Empire Rheumatism Council, now known as Arthritis Research UK, and has made significant contributions to developments in the field of Rheumatology. He has published a book on nutrition, "Human nutrition and dietetics", based on his research in the field. He was also interested in the field of hematology.

== Personal life ==
Davidson married Isabel Margaret Anderson (d.1979) on 27 July 1927 in Edinburgh. They had no children.

They lived in Woodhall House in Juniper Green, south-west of Edinburgh from 1953 to 1957. He died on 27 September 1981.

He is buried in the ancient stone vault of his ancestor, George Davidson of Newmills, in Currie churchyard, near his family home.

== Books published ==
Davidson's medical textbook Principles and Practice of Medicine was first published in 1952. His lecture notes that he had previously distributed to students while working in the University of Edinburgh formed the basis of this publication. The book was of "modest size and price" and was well received by medical students. The book is now in its 24th edition, is considered a standard text for undergraduate medical students, and has sold over two million copies altogether.

In 1959 Davidson wrote, with collaborators A.P Meiklejohn and R. Passmore, the book Human nutrition and Dietetics that dealt with nutrition and health. The book has remained a standard reference on nutrition since then.

He co-wrote The Textbook of Medical Treatment with Sir Derrick Dunlop.

Academic offices
Preceded by William Alister Alexander	President of the Royal College of Physicians of Edinburgh; 1953–1957	Succeeded by Alexander Rae Gilchrist

== See also ==
- Sir Robert Hutchison, the original editor of the medical book, "Clinical Methods", which is now known as "Hutchison's Clinical Methods".
