= Horace Tabberer Brown =

British chemist

Horace Brown
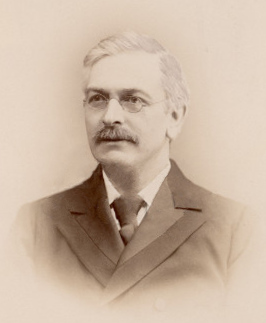
- Born: Horace Tabberer; 20 July 1848; Burton, Staffordshire, England
- Died: 6 February 1925 (aged 76); Kensington, London
- Occupation: Chemist
- Relatives: Adrian John Brown (half brother)

Horace Tabberer Brown FRS (born Tabberer; 20 July 1848 – 6 February 1925) was a British chemist.

== Early life ==
Brown was born in Burton upon Trent, the sixth child of Benjamin Tabberer, a farmer, and Jane Atkin Tabberer. He had four elder sisters – Sophia, Jane, Julia, and Beatrice – and an elder brother, Benjamin. His father died in February 1848, five months prior to Brown's birth. In February 1849, his mother remarried Edwin Brown, a banker and amateur naturalist, which led to Brown's interest in science around age 12. His younger half brother was Adrian John Brown.

He was educated at Burton and Atherstone Grammar Schools and at the Royal College of Chemistry.

== Career ==
Brown started work at the Worthington Brewery in 1866. His focus was to solve practical brewing problems by employing and developing fundamental scientific principles. His research work considered barley germination, beer microbiology, water composition, oxygen and fermentation, beer haze formation, wort composition and beer analysis.

A true polymath, he left his mark on virtually all areas of science as applied to brewing, in a career which lasted over 50 years. His earliest work concerned treatment of sewage and analyses of the Burton waters. Later he took up study of geology, being led to it by pressing requirements in connection with the water supply of Burton. This entailed a good deal of field surveying, which was embodied in a paper on the Permian Rocks of the Leicestershire Coalfield.

He was elected a Fellow of the Royal Society in 1889. From 1890 onward studied the assimilation of Carbon dioxide in plants. He also established the Guinness Research Laboratory in Dublin in 1901.

He died at 5 Evelyn Gardens, Kensington.

== Awards ==
He was awarded the Longstaff Medal of the Chemical Society in 1894, a Royal Medal of the Royal Society in 1903 and the Copley Medal in 1920.

== The Horace Brown Medal ==
The Institute of Brewing and Distilling awards the Horace Brown Medal to eminent scientist every three years. The winner is invited to give a lecture, called the Horace Brown Medal lecture.

Winners include:

- Henry Edward Armstrong (the first recipient in 1926)
- Ernest Stanley Salmon (1955)
- John Simpson Ford
- D E Briggs (1999)
- Lionel D Maule (2005)
- Graham Stewart (2008)
- Tim Dolan (2011)
- Charlie Bamforth (2018)
