= Campden BRI =

Food and drink research organisation in the UK

- Formation: 1919; 107 years ago
- Location: Chipping Campden, UK
- Website: www.campdenbri.co.uk

Campden BRI, formerly known as the Campden Food and Drink Research Association (CFDRA), is a research organisation that worked to advance the technologies and techniques related to food and drink preparation.

== History ==
The origins of Campden BRI can be traced back to the First World War, during which the British government keenly sought new preservation techniques to bolster food security. It was decided to create a new organisation to conduct research into this matter that would be based in an existing milling facility for pheasant feed adjacent to Chipping Campden railway station. The newly created organisation had links to the Ministry of Agriculture and Fisheries as well as the University of Bristol. The conflict ended before the Campden Experimental Factory became operational in 1919.

Early research endeavours were primarily related to the emerging practice of canning and the principles of thermal processing. In the 1920s, it developed the Campden tablet. In the 1930s, the Campden site was expanded via the addition of chilling and freezing rooms, which were used to produce frozen packaged foods. During the interwar period, funding for the organisation was limited, requiring frequent improvisation in its research processes as well as requiring visitors to camp on the grounds. Government funding was progressively withdrawn; in its place, contributions from the food industry became increasingly important, and the organisation became entirely self-funded in the early 1950s.

In August 1952, it was reorganised as a research association, and adopted a new name as the Campden Food Preservation Research Association. In the 1960s, clients of the Association included virtually all of the canned fruit and vegetable producers in Britain, as well as many of the businesses comprising the domestic quick-freeze industry. Accordingly, much of its research was centred upon prospective improvements into the canning and freezing processes, along with efforts into process monitoring and packaging sterilisation techniques. The 1960s saw rapid expansion of activity at Campden into all aspects of food and drink processing and preservation, performing chemical and microbiological analysis, consumer and sensory studies, hygienic-oriented design of both facilities and equipment, publishing guidance, and the training of food industry workers.

In the 1980s, the Association studied early microwave processing technologies and formed the Campden computer control club to encourage use of computing in food process management. In January 1995, the organisation became the Campden and Chorleywood Food Research Association following its integration of the Flour Milling and Baking Research Association.

By the 2020s, Campden BRI reportedly had in excess of 2,500 companies across 80 countries that maintain membership of the company; it interacts with the industry via 14 technical advisory panels and numerous industrial working parties. It has been engaged in consultancy work on behalf of various organisations, including its subscribing members within the industry and governmental bodies, including the European Union. Campden BRI facilities include three food processing halls, a dedicated sensory analysis suite, along with several laboratories equipped to perform microbiology, chemistry, and biochemistry research.

== See also ==
- Brewing Industry Research Foundation
