= Anthony Purssell =

English rower and businessman (born 1926)

Personal information
- Born: Anthony John Richard Purssell; 5 July 1926 (age 100) Shimla, British India

Sport
- Sport: Rowing

Anthony John Richard Purssell (born 5 July 1926), known as Tony Purssell, is an English brewing executive, businessman and Olympic rower. He was President of the Institute of Brewing.

== Biography ==
Purssell was born in Shimla, India, on 5 July 1926. In 1952, he married Ann Margaret Batchelor and with her had two sons and one daughter.

Purssell graduated from Oriel College, Oxford, with a Bachelor of Arts honours degree in chemistry in 1948. While at Oxford, he gained three blues for rowing, representing the university in the boat race between 1946 and 1948. He rowed for Great Britain in the 1948 Summer Olympics in the coxed four and they were eliminated in the quarter-final. He joined Guinness's Park Royal site as a brewer in 1948. Seven years later, he became head of its research laboratory and then in 1960 became brewer in charge of brewing. Three years later, he became director of Arthur Guinness Son & Co. (Park Royal) Ltd. and was appointed the company's Director of Personnel. In 1968, Purssell became the firm's Managing Director and in 1973 took the same position at Arthur Guinness Son & Co. (Dublin) Ltd. He held that post until 1975, when he took up the equivalent position at Arthur Guinness & Sons Plc between 1975 and 1981. He became that company's Joint Deputy Chairman in 1981, serving for two years.

Purssell was a member of the Independent Broadcasting Authority (1976–81), the Civil Aviation Authority (1984–90), and the Thames Valley and South Midlands Regional Board; he was also a Regional Director (1982–91) and Chairman (1989–91) of Lloyds Bank Plc. He was a Trustee and Honorary Treasurer of Oxfam between 1985 and 1992; the following year, he became Trustee for the National Society for Epilepsy; he was the organisation's Chairman between 1995 and 1998, ceased to be a Trustee in 2008, and was appointed vice-president in 2010. Purssell was also on the Council of the Institute of Brewing between 1960 and 1963, and again between 1968 and 1972, when he was elected its Deputy President. In 1974, he became its president for a two-year term, and later served as a vice-president. He is also fellow of the institute, and of the Incorporated Brewers' Guild, as well as a Companion of the British Institute of Management.

On 5 July 2026, Purssell turned 100.

Preceded by Ewart Agnew Boddington	President of the Institute of Brewing; 1974–1976	Succeeded by Charles Henderson Tidbury
