= American Society of Brewing Chemists =

- Abbreviation: ASBC
- Formation: 1934
- Legal status: Non-profit company
- Purpose: To improve and bring uniformity to the brewing industry on a technical level.
- Location: 3340 Pilot Knob Road St. Paul, MN 55121 USA
- President: Scott Britton
- Website: www.asbcnet.org

The American Society of Brewing Chemists (ASBC) is a professional organization of scientists and technical professionals in the brewing, malting, and allied industries. It publishes a journal, the Journal of the American Society of Brewing Chemists.

Multiple books have used data conducted by the ASBC.

Rebecca Newman, one of past presidents of the organization, was a member of the Master Brewers Association of the Americas. Newman also worked for various breweries, like Anheuser-Busch and Boston Brewing Company. She became the quality manager of the Summit Brewing Company (St. Paul) in December 2015.
