= Master Brewers Association of the Americas =

The Master Brewers Association of the Americas (MBAA) was founded in 1887. It publishes the Technical Quarterly, a technical journal; some of the articles are peer-reviewed.

One of the original officers elected at the Association's first convention in March 1887 was William Gerst Sr. who would serve as its second president 1889–1891. A widely respected brewer in Nashville, Tennessee, Gerst is also remembered for winning the 1910 Kentucky Derby with his horse Donau.

== See also ==
Master Brewers Association of the Americas District Northwest Records, 1935-2016

Institute of Brewing and Distilling
