= Adrian John Brown =

British Professor of Malting and Brewing

- Born: 27 April 1852; Burton, Staffordshire, England
- Died: 2 July 1919 (aged 67)
- Education: Royal College of Science, London
- Known for: Explaining enzyme action in terms of saturation
- Relatives: Horace Tabberer Brown (half-brother)
- Scientific career
- Fields: Malting and brewing, fermentation, enzyme action
- Workplaces: Burton-on-Trent; St Bartholomew's Hospital, London; Mason University College, now University of Birmingham

Adrian John Brown, FRS (27 April 1852 – 2 July 1919) was a British Professor of Malting and Brewing at the University of Birmingham and a pioneer in the study of enzyme kinetics.

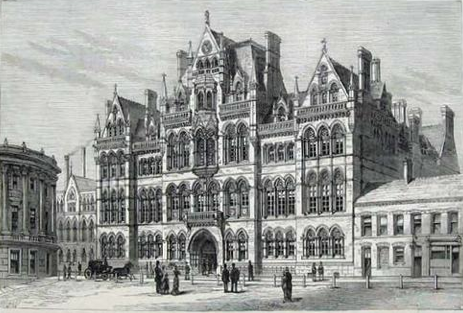
Mason University College, now the University of Birmingham

He was born at Burton-on-Trent, Staffordshire to Edwin Brown, a bank manager in the town. His elder brother was Horace Tabberer Brown. He attended the local grammar school and then went up to study chemistry at the Royal College of Science in London. He became private assistant to Dr Russell at St Bartholomew's Hospital Medical School. In 1873 he returned to Burton to work as a chemist in the brewing industry for the next twenty-five years. In 1899 he left to become Professor of Brewing and Malting at Mason University College (which became Birmingham University in 1900).

He studied the rate of fermentation of sucrose by yeast and suggested in 1892 that a substance in the yeast might be responsible for speeding up the reaction. This was the first time enzymes were suggested as separate entities from organisms and talked about in chemical terms. He later studied the enzyme responsible and made the striking suggestion that the kinetics he observed were the result of an enzyme–substrate complex being formed during the reaction, a concept that has formed the basis of all later work on enzyme kinetics. Similar ideas had been put earlier by German chemist and Nobel laureate Hermann Emil Fischer by comparing substrate and enzyme with a key and a lock.
