= Brewing Industry Research Foundation =

English research association

Coordinates: 51°13′49″N 0°07′20″W

Campden Brewing Division BRI
- Abbreviation: BRI
- Formation: 1946
- Purpose: Brewing research in the UK
- Location: Centenary Hall, Coopers Hill Road, Nutfield, Surrey, UK, RH1 4HY
- Region served: Worldwide
- Members: 55 staff
- Affiliations: DEFRA
- Website: Campden BRI

The Campden Brewing Division BRI (formerly known as the Brewing Industry Research Foundation) is a beverage research organisation. It is a subsidiary of Campden BRI, a UK-based research association serving all sectors of the food and drink industry. Between 1951 and 2024, the Brewing Division was primarily based next to the M23 at Nutfield. Much of its activities are presently located in Chipping Campden, Gloucestershire.

Orginally established in 1946 at the direction of the Institute of Brewing, the Foundation promptly acquirred Lyttel Hall in Nutfield; it was formally opened as its primary research site in late 1951. It underwent substantial reorganisation during the 1970s, becoming commonly known as BRI around this time. In October 2008, through the merger of Brewing Research International with the Campden & Chorleywood Food Research Association (CCFRA), Campden BRI was created.

== History ==
In 1946, the Institute of Brewing recommended the setting up of an experimental research station, the Brewing Industry Research Foundation (BIRF). It had a full-time Director of Research; in 1947, Dr J. Masson Gulland (Professor of Organic Chemistry at the University of Nottingham) was appointed to that position, however, Dr Masson Gulland was killed in a train crash before taking up his position and hence Sir Ian Heilbron (Imperial College London) agreed to become the second Director of Research at the BIRF in 1949.

In 1948, Lyttel Hall, Nutfield in Surrey was purchased and the premises adapted to serve as its main base. Specifically, the main hall was converted into laboratories, the squash court into a pilot brewery, and various new buildings built to contain workshops, conference facilities, restaurant, and ancillary apparatus. In late 1951, the formal opening of the site was officiated by the Duke of Edinburgh Prince Philip.

Early on, the BIRF focused on fundamental and applied research on behalf of Brtain's malting and brewing industries. By September 1952, it had been involved in the provision of technical services, undertaken several exploratory chemical investigations, the monthly issuing of a bulletin of current literature, and the operation of the National Collection of Yeast Cultures amongst other activities. Furthermore, by the mid 1950s, staff at the Foundation had made useful contributions in the areas of barley germination and yeast physiology.

In the early to mid 1970s, the Foundation underwent reorganisation; accordingly, the BIRF became The Brewing Research Foundation, BRF International, Brewing Research International and (until its merger with CCFRA) was simply known as BRI.

In 1976, control of Brewing Patents Ltd was transferred from the Brewers' Society to the BRI.

Over time, the Foundation's role evolved towards being increasingly service-orientated, offering analysis, food safety and information packages that serve an international client base.

In February 1992, BRF International was incorporated; it was renamed Brewing Research International five years later.

In October 2008, Campden BRI was formed by the merger of Brewing Research International with the Campden & Chorleywood Food Research Association (CCFRA), which was based at Chipping Campden and had become the largest membership-based food research organisation in the world. Since this merger, it has operated at a division of Campden BRI and continued to actively work with its traditional clients across the brewery industry.

In June 2024, the Brewing site in Nutfield was perminantly closed, after which it was put up for sale.

== Functions and impact ==
Its services are used by the vast majority of the world's brewing companies.

Many young scientists of the Brewing Industry found initial employment at this Foundation to become important contributors elsewhere in the Brewing and allied industries.
