= Oldham Brewery =

Brewery based in Oldham, England

Oldham Brewery Ltd was an English brewery based in Oldham, Lancashire. It was founded in 1873.

== History ==
The Brewery (Albion Brewery, Coldhurst Street, Oldham) was built close to the town centre by the Stott family of architects. Previously a hat factory, brewing started on the site in 1868. The brewery company itself was formed 5 years later, in 1873. There were numerous OB tied public houses in and around the Oldham area.

The brewery was sold to Boddington's in 1982, and brewing in Oldham stopped soon afterwards. Boddingtons itself was sold to Whitbread in the 1990s and the OB Brand disappeared from sale.

Robinson's Brewery bought the brand in 2006 and OB Bitter can be found on sale in some Robinson's pubs, and as a guest beer in some others.

== Beers ==
The company brewed and sold OB branded beers:

- OB Bitter
- OB Mild
- OB Pale Ale
- OB Old Gold
- OB Brown Ale
- OB Oldham Stout
- OB Old Tom
- Kaltenberg Lager
- Rhinegold Lager
