= Institute of Brewing and Distilling =

Industry trade association

The Institute of Brewing & Distilling
- Abbreviation: IBD
- Formation: 1998; 28 years ago
- Legal status: Non-profit company
- Location: London, SE1
- Region served: United Kingdom
- Website: IBD.org.uk

The Institute of Brewing and Distilling (IBD) is an industry trade association for brewers and distillers, both in the United Kingdom and internationally. The IBD had its headquarters at Clarges Street in London London until 2014 at which time the Institute moved to its current location in Curlew Street, south of the River Thames.

== History ==
The institute can trace its roots back to 1886 when a group of ten scientists with interests in malting and brewing science formed The Laboratory Club, which later became the Institute of Brewing (IoB). In October 1906 a group of Yorkshire brewers established the Operative Brewers' Guild, which changed its name to the Brewers' Guild in 1929. The Guild and the Institute merged to form the Institute and Guild of Brewing (IGB) in 2001, which was later renamed as the Institute of Brewing and Distilling in 2005.

== Publications of the IBD ==
The Brewer and Distiller International is a full colour monthly publication that is sent out to full IBD members.

The Journal of the Institute of Brewing is a quarterly academic journal of peer-reviewed published research articles, with ISSN 0046-9750 and indexed in Scopus.

== Presidents ==
This list is incomplete:

=== Institute of Brewing ===
- 1904-05 Charles Hagart Babington
- 1905-06 Sir William Waters Butler, 1st Baronet
- 1906-07 Montagu Martin Weller Baird
- 1907-08 Alfred Gordon Salamon, ARSM, FIC
- 1908-09 James Grimble Groves, DL, JP
- 1909-10 Edwyn Frederick Barclay
- 1910-11 Henry Herbert Riley-Smith
- 1911-13 Alfred Chaston Chapman, FRS, FIC
- 1913-15 Francis Pelham Whitbread
- 1915-17 Thomas Watson Lovibond, FIC
- 1917-19 Adrian John Brown, MSc, FIC, FRS
- 1919-21 Sydney Oswald Nevile
- 1921-23 Henry Edmund Field
- 1923-24 Edward Ralph Moritz, FIC
- 1924-26 Robert Valentine Reid
- 1926-28 Francis Pelham Whitbread
- 1928-30 Robert John Baker Storey
- 1930-32 Percy Gates
- 1932-34 James Stonehouse, ACGI
- 1934-36 Christopher George
- 1936-37 Harold Wallis Harman
- 1937-38 Cecil Ernest Wells Charrington, MC
- 1938-39 Thomas Edward Grant
- 1939-41 Lt-Col. James Herbert Porter, CBE, DSO
- 1941-43 George Thomas Cook
- 1943-44 Harold Wallis Harman
- 1944-45 Cecil Ernest Wells Charrington, MC
- 1945-47 Walter Scott, JP
- 1947-52 Maurice Vandeleur Courage
- 1952-54 John Morison Inches
- 1954-56 John Edmund Martineau, MA
- 1956-58 George Mesnard Parsons
- 1958-60 Maurice Arthur Pryor
- 1960-62 John Gretton, 2nd Baron Gretton, OBE
- 1962-64 Lt-Col. Francis Northey Richardson, TD, JP
- 1964-66 Arthur Harold John Brook
- 1966-68 Norman Bryce Smiley, MA
- 1968-70 Clifford Furness Mackay
- 1970-72 Prof. Anna Macgillivray MacLeod, DSc, PhD, FIBiol, FRSE
- 1972-74 Ewart Agnew Boddington, MA, JP
- 1974-76 Anthony John Richard Purssell, MA
- 1976-78 Charles Henderson Tidbury
- 1978-80 Peter Beal Hossell
- 1980-82 Michael Henry van Gruisen, TD, MA
- 1982-84 Michael Chalcraft
- 1984-86 Norman Sydney Curtis, BSc, CChem, FRSC
- 1986-88 Peter Edward Ashworth, MA
- 1988-90 R. W. Ricketts
- ...
- -1994 A. L. Whitear
- 1994-96 R. Summers, FIBrew
- 1996-97 R. Summers, DUniv, FIBrew
- 1997-98 P. A. Brookes, MA, PhD, FIBrew
- 1998-99
- 1999-2000 Graham Stewart
- 2000-01

=== Institute and Guild of Brewing ===
- 2001-02 Adrian Gardner
- 2002-03 Dr J. Andrews
- 2003-04 G. Den
- 2004-05 W. J. Taylor

=== Institute of Brewing and Distilling ===
- 2005-07 Dr F. H. White
- 2007-08 Dr D. S. Ryder
- 2008-10 P. Ward
- 2010-11 Alastair Kennedy
- 2011-12 Donald Nelson
- 2012-14 Alan Barclay
- 2014-16 Prof. Charles W. Bamforth

Up to 1926-27: "Past Presidents". Journal of the Institute of Brewing. 32:7 (December 1926). p. 6;
Up to 1984-85: The Institute of Brewing (c. 1985). Institute of Brewing. p. 11

== Arms ==
Coat of arms of Institute of Brewing and Distilling

Notes
Granted 5 January 1928.
Crest
Issuant out of a coronet composed of four hop cones and as many hop leaves alternately set upon a rim Or a demi griffin Sable supporting a malt shovel Gold.
Escutcheon
Gules two garbs of barley in saltire between three tuns fessewise Or.
