= Samuel Whitbread =

Samuel Whitbread may refer to:

- Samuel Whitbread (1720–1796), English brewer and Member of Parliament
- Samuel Whitbread (1764–1815), his son, English politician
- Samuel Charles Whitbread (1796–1879), his son, British Member of Parliament for Middlesex, 1820–1830
- Samuel Whitbread (1830–1915) (1858–1944), his son, British Member of Parliament for Bedford, 1852–1895
- Samuel Whitbread (Liberal politician) (1858 – 1944), his son, British Member of Parliament for Luton, 1892–1895, and Huntingdon, 1906–1910
- Sir Samuel Whitbread (businessman, born 1937) (1937–2023), his grandson, former chairman of Whitbread & Co. and Lord Lieutenant of Bedfordshire

== See also ==
- Samuel Whitbread Academy, a secondary school in Shefford, Bedfordshire
