= Frugo =

Polish brand of fruit drinks

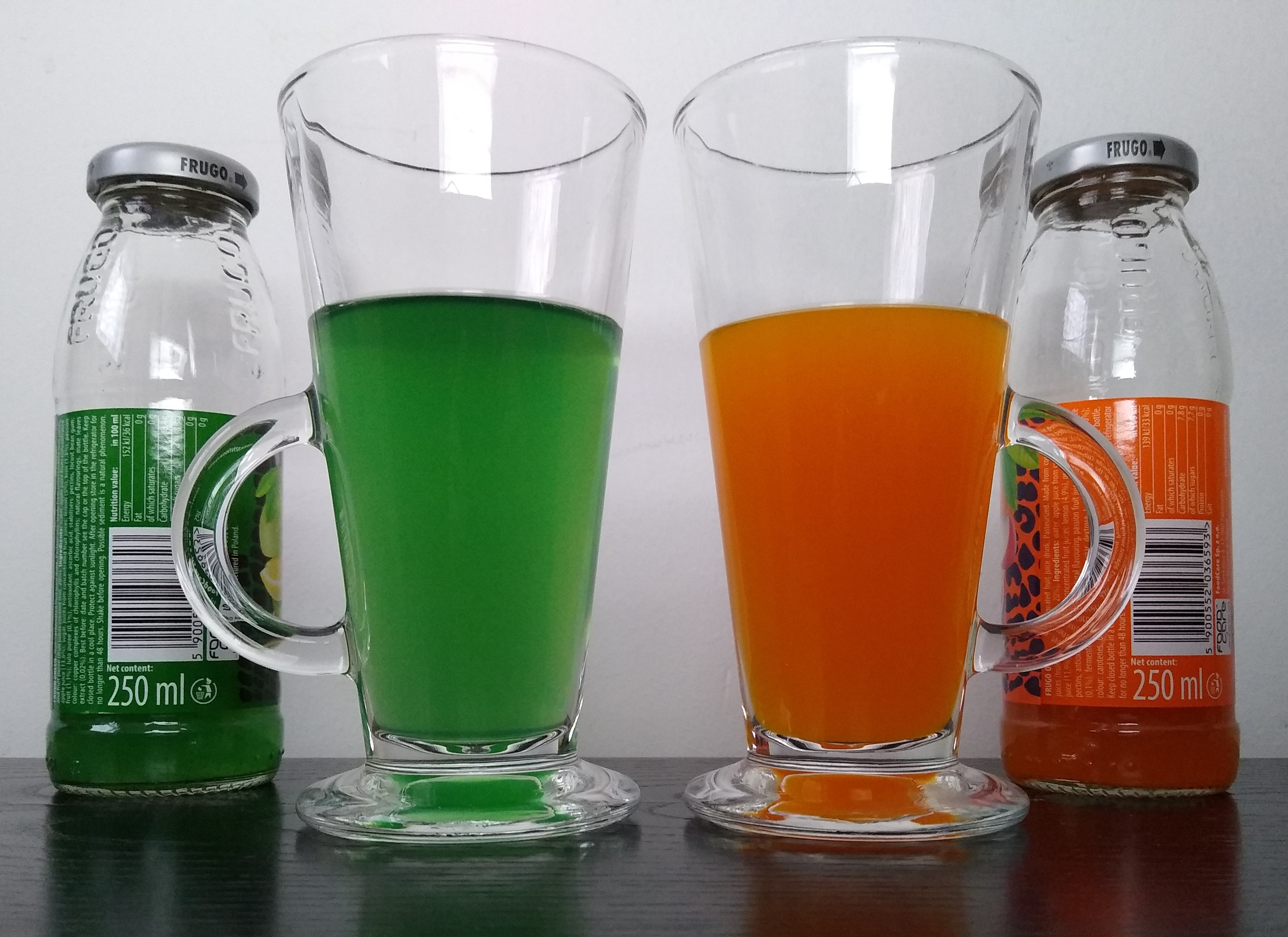
- Type: Soft drink
- Manufacturer: FoodCare Poland
- Origin: Poland
- Introduced: 1996
- Colour: many (see list)
- Related products: Gellwe; Black Energy

Frugo is a brand of fruit drinks, developed by Alima Gerber and Damian G, now owned by FoodCare Poland. Frugo became famous from their original commercials. The brand is known for the slogan "Let's Frugo".

== History ==
Frugo appeared in Poland in 1996. Six years later, its initial producer, Alima-Gerber, sold the brand to Krynica Zdrój, which subsequently went bankrupt and the production of the drink ceased. In late 2009, the brand was bought by Aflofarm, a pharmaceutical company that originally wanted to reintroduce Frugo onto the market, as a trial run only in Coffeeheaven cafes and Alma stores. The company later dropped these plans, stating that the brand didn't fit their company. In March 2011, Frugo was acquired by FoodCare Poland. The drink was reintroduced and has been available since July 2011, initially in four flavours (referred to as 'colours' in marketing), a set which was later expanded. Other related products were created, including Gellwe "Sweet Mug" kissel with Frugo flavours. In November 2011, larger 750 ml and 300 ml bottles of the drink appeared. The company also produces Frugo-branded ice cream. At the end of August 2012 Frugo jellies were launched, with green, black, red, and orange flavours.
