= Brickwood =

Brickwood is both a surname and a given name. Notable people with the name include:

- Edwin Brickwood (1837–1906), British rower
- John Brickwood (disambiguation)
- Brickwood Galuteria, member of the Hawaii State Senate

== See also ==
- Brickwood baronets, a British baronetcy
