= John Brickwood =

John Brickwood may refer to:

- Sir John Brickwood, 1st Baronet (1852–1932), of the Brickwood baronets and first chairman of Portsmouth F.C.
- John Brickwood (businessman) (1721–1786), associate of John Strettell

== See also ==
- Brickwood
