= Costa Coffee =

British coffeehouse company

Costa Limited
- Trade name: Costa Coffee
- Formerly: C. B. Costa Bros. Coffee Co. Limited (1976–1997)
- Type: Subsidiary
- Industry: Coffee shop
- Founded: 1971; 55 years ago; London, England, UK
- Founder: Bruno Costa; Sergio Costa
- Headquarters: Loudwater, Buckinghamshire, England, United Kingdom
- Number of locations: ▲4,000 (2025)
- Area served: Worldwide
- Key people: Philippe Schaillee (CEO)
- Products: Coffee; Tea; Sandwiches; Wraps; Sweet snacks; Iced drinks
- Revenue: ▲£1.168 billion (2016)
- Net income: ▲£153 million (2016)
- Number of employees: 17,809 (2022)
- Parent: The Coca-Cola Company (2019–present)
- Website: costa.co.uk

Costa Limited, trading as Costa Coffee, is a British coffeehouse chain with headquarters in Loudwater, Buckinghamshire, England. It operates in the United Kingdom and 37 other countries.

Costa Coffee was founded in London in 1971 by the brothers Bruno and Sergio Costa as a wholesale operation supplying roasted coffee to caterers and specialist Italian coffee shops. It was acquired by Whitbread in 1995, then sold to The Coca-Cola Company in January 2019 in a deal worth $4.9 billion, and has grown to over 4,000 stores across 31 countries and 18,412 employees. As of 2016, the business had over 2,700 cafes in the UK and Ireland, over 14,200 Costa Express vending facilities and a further 1,300 outlets overseas, including 460 in China.

Costa is the second largest coffeehouse chain in the world, and the second largest in the UK.

== History ==
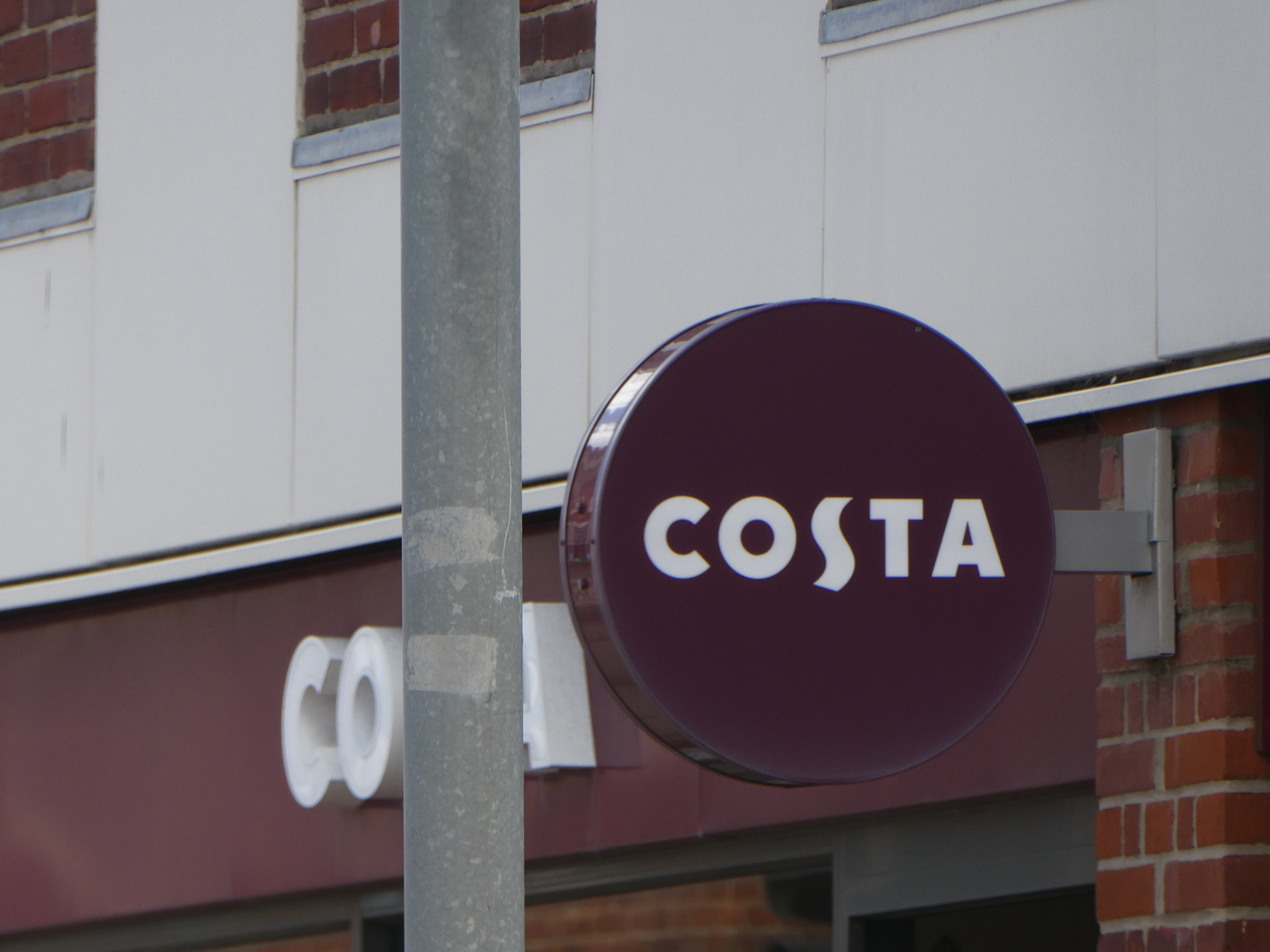
Signage outside a branch in Cromer, Norfolk

Bruno and Sergio Costa founded a coffee roastery in Fenchurch Street, London, in 1971, supplying local caterers. The family had moved to England from Parma, Italy, in the 1950s. Costa branched out to selling coffee and opened their first store in Vauxhall Bridge Road, London in 1981.

By 1995, the Costa Coffee chain had 41 stores in UK, and was acquired by Whitbread, the UK's largest hotel and coffee shop operator, becoming a wholly owned subsidiary. In 2009, Costa opened its 1,000th store, in Cardiff. In December 2009, Costa Coffee agreed to acquire the Polish chain Coffeeheaven for £36 million, adding 79 stores in central and eastern Europe.

The company's products (such as its coffee and drinks) were sold in Brewers Fayre and Beefeater until it was subsequently purchased by the Coca-Cola Company from Whitbread.

In 2018, Whitbread faced pressure from two of its largest shareholders, activist group Elliott Advisers and hedge fund Sachem Head, to sell or demerge Costa Coffee, the theory being that the individual businesses would be worth much more than the one company alone. On 25 April 2018, Whitbread announced its intention to fully demerge Costa within two years. On 3 January 2019, the Coca-Cola Company purchased Costa Coffee for $4.9 billion.

In March 2020, all UK coffee shops were closed indefinitely due to the COVID-19 pandemic. In late May some branches reopened for takeaway or drive-through orders. In 2022, Costa Coffee discontinued the Costa Book Awards that Whitbread had started 51 years earlier. At the end of July 2022 Jill McDonald stepped down as CEO of the company, and was succeeded by Philippe Schaillee in April 2023.

In August 2025, it was reported that Coca-Cola was exploring the sale of Costa due to sharply rising costs and competition. Coca-Cola would, however, keep its canned coffee range.

== Products ==
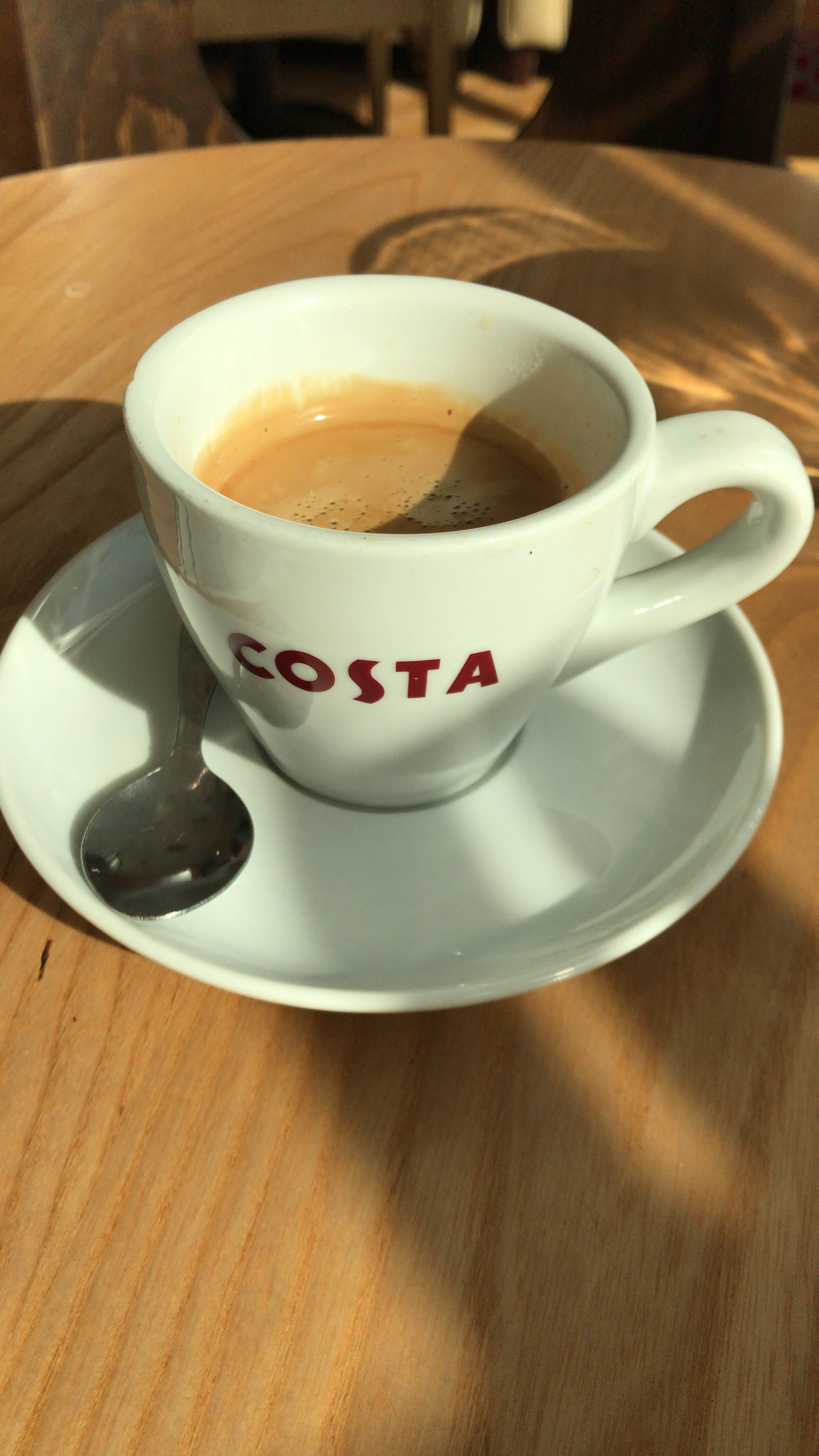
A Costa espresso served at Queen Elizabeth Hospital Birmingham.

Costa branches sell hot and cold drinks, sandwiches, cakes and pastries, and snacks. In 2020, the brand collaborated with three Nestlé chocolate brands (Quality Street, After Eight and Terry's) for some of their limited-edition Christmas drinks.

Costa moved its roastery from Lambeth to Basildon, Essex, in May 2017 with an investment of £38 million, increasing their annual coffee-roasting capacity from 11,000 to 45,000 tonnes (12,000 to 50,000 short tons).

In 2019, Costa Coffee committed to sourcing 100% cage-free eggs globally by 2025. Following this, the company has reported that approximately 75% of the eggs used in its global operations are cage-free, with full compliance already achieved in the United Kingdom and the United States. In 2025, the International Council for Animal Welfare (ICAW) started a campaign in support of Costa Coffee's cage-free pledge.

In February 2022, an investigation by BBC's Panorama found dairy cows supplying milk to Costa were being abused on a farm in Wales. Workers kicked and punched cows in the face and stomach, twisted their tails, and hit them with sharp metal shovels. Cows were left to die overnight and medical care was not provided when required.

In January 2023, an investigation by animal rights group Viva! reported the poor treatment of dairy cows at a farm that supplies Costa and various other customers. The animals were also handled roughly, with one being hit in the udder and others being slapped or having their heads pushed, footage suggested. Costa responded to say they had investigated the supplier and found that it complies with Red Tractor standards on animal welfare.

Costa Coffee employs Gennaro Pelliccia as a coffee taster, who had his tongue insured for £10m with Lloyd's of London in 2009.

In 2020, Costa Coffee introduced canned coffee and iced coffee.

== Operations ==
=== Management ===
On 19 August 2019, Costa Coffee attracted media attention due to claims of unfair deductions from the pay of its employees. Costa said contracts for franchise stores were managed by franchisees, and that some staff contracts did have "clauses relating to deductions".

Four days later, additional claims appeared in the media that Costa Coffee franchise workers were "not treated like humans". The report included managers' alleged refusal to pay for sickness, annual leave, or working outside contracted hours, and retaining tips. It cited an anonymous former employee at a store under Goldex Essex Investments Ltd who claimed that almost £1,000 of their holiday pay was deducted from their salary, despite being contracted to work 48 hours a week. The report said that baristas and employees at managerial level had complained about the numerous deductions outlined in Costa Coffee franchisees' contracts. A Costa Coffee spokesperson responded that an independent audit had been launched.

In February 2023, a 13-year-old girl died after drinking a hot chocolate from a Costa in East London. She suffered a severe allergic reaction and died in hospital despite being treated with an EpiPen. The inquest found that there had been a failure of communication between the girls' mother, who ordered the drink, and the Costa staff, causing the drink to be made with dairy milk. It also ruled that training provided to Costa staff on food allergies was not sufficient at the time, only consisting of a "tick-box exercise".

=== Promotion ===
In July 2023, a Costa Express van had art depicting a trans man with top surgery scars, as part of a mural designed for Pride Month. The design provoked backlash from gender-critical commentators James Esses, Maya Forstater, and Helen Joyce. Costa defended the art, saying that it "showcases and celebrates inclusivity".

Costa Coffee was the sponsor of the Costa Book Awards (formerly the Whitbread Book Awards) from 2006 to 2022.

=== Locations ===
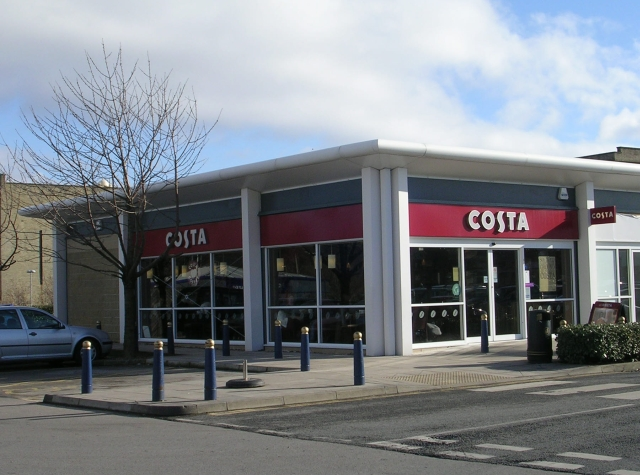
A Costa Coffee branch in Forster Square Retail Park, Bradford, West Yorkshire

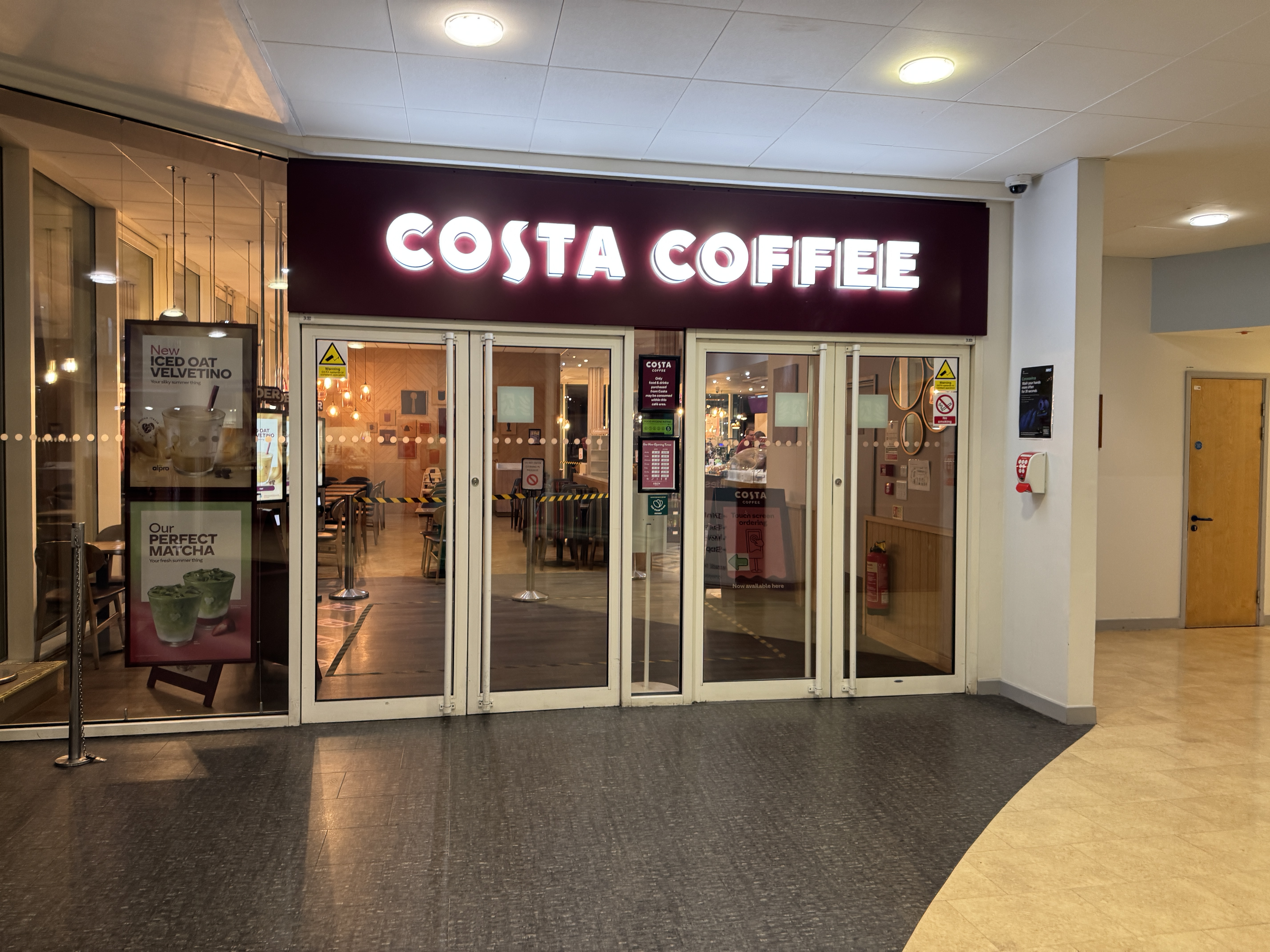
Costa Coffee in Kent, South East England

Costa Coffee operates 2,467 outlets in the United Kingdom as of October 2019. Overseas, it operates 1,413 stores in 32 countries. The first Costa store outside the UK opened in the United Arab Emirates in 1999, and, in September 2017, was the first coffee shop worldwide to start delivering coffee via drones.

Costa Coffee's headquarters are in Loudwater in the UK, with the Costa Roastery being located in Basildon, Essex.

The following table shows the amount of stores, when they entered and who they're operated by

Country	Entered	Stores	Operated by
Bahrain	2008	20	Zayani Foods
Belgium	2010	1	Lagardère Travel Retail
Bulgaria	2006	23	Coffee Life Ltd
China	2006	380	Beijing Hualian Group | Costa Coffee
Croatia	2012	7	Vlamanda Group + Delta Holding
Cyprus	2005	22	Symeonides Coffee Cyprus
Czech Republic	2008	48	Lagardère Travel Retail
Egypt	2010	55	Americana Group
France	2013	2	Costa Coffee
Germany	2010	1	Costa Coffee
Greece	2007–2012	10	Costa Coffee
Hungary	2008–2021	1	L-Coffee
India	2005	292	Costa Coffee
Indonesia	2017	1	Avolta
Ireland	2005	150	MBCC Foods Ireland
Isle of Man	2001	7	Fancy a Coffee Limited
Italy	2024	2	Avolta
Japan	2023	10	Sojitz Royal Café Corporation
Jordan	2011	4	Costa Coffee
Kuwait	2008	100	Alghanim Industries
Latvia	2011	11	Lagardère Travel Retail
Malaysia	2018	15	Gapurna Permai Sdn Bhd
Malta	2011	12	Corinthia Group
Mexico	2025	4	Costa Coffee
Montenegro	2012	1	Sojitz Royal Cafe Corporation
Morocco	2013	7	Goldex Morocco
Oman	2009	6	Alghanim Industries
Pakistan	2022	10	Gerry’s Group
Philippines	2018	16	Robinsons Retail Holdings, Inc
Poland	2007	117	Lagardère Travel Retail
Portugal	2013	50	Costa Coffee
Qatar	2009	6	Alghanim Industries
Romania	2006–2011	12	Coffee Management
Saudi Arabia	2019	100	Alghanim Industries
Singapore	2014–2018	8	Costa Coffee
South Africa	2020	23	Coca-Cola Beverages
Switzerland	2020	1	Costa Coffee
Thailand	2013	1	Express Food Group
Turkey	2012	4	Boyner Büyük Mağazacılık
United Arab Emirates	1999	160	Emirates Leisure Retail
United Kingdom	1971	2,596	Costa Coffee
United States	2022	5	Costa Coffee
Vietnam	2019	1	Avolta
Total (Including UK)	4,198		
Total (Excluding UK)	1,602		

=== Costa Express ===
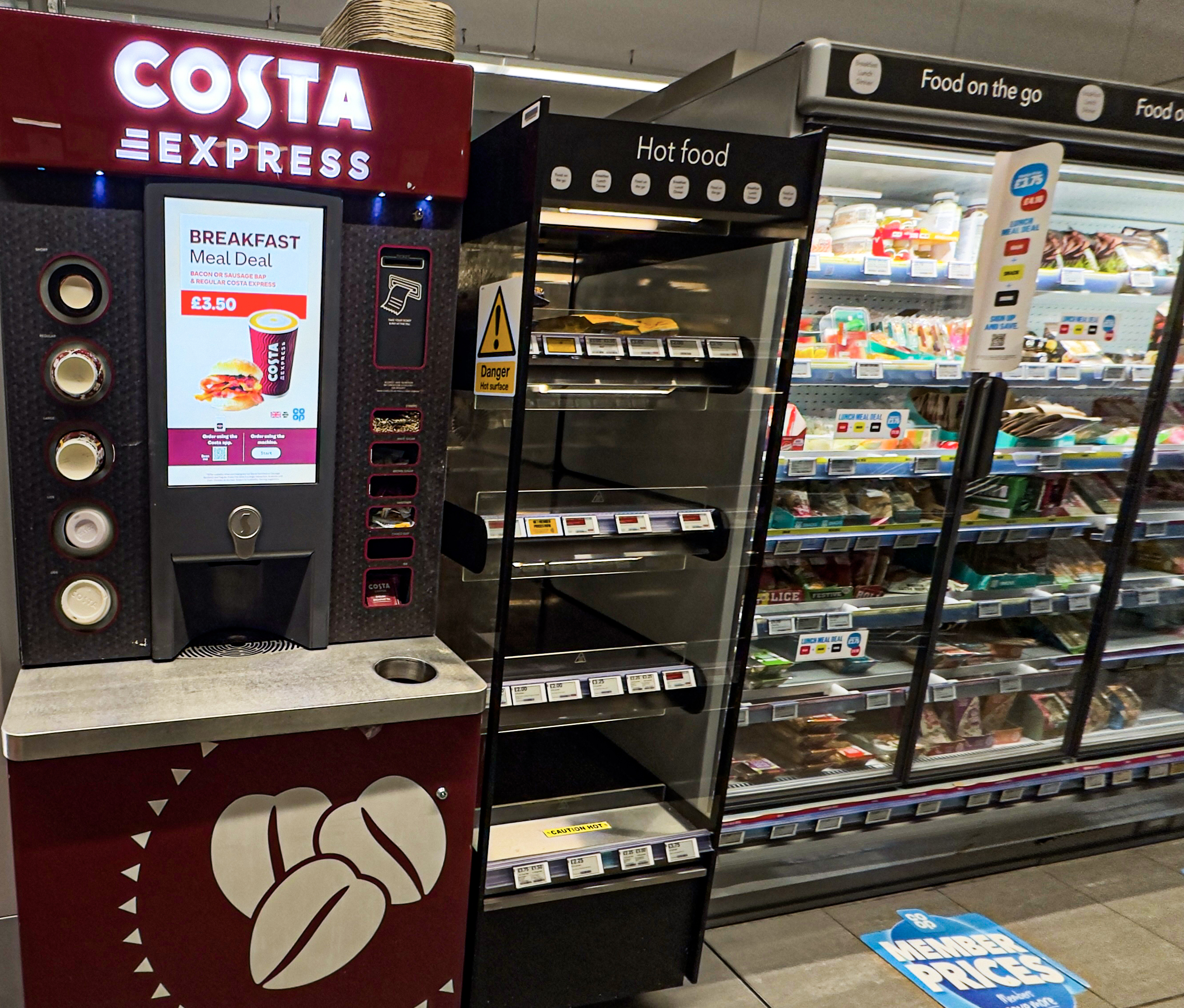
A typical Costa Express machine inside of a Co-Op Food store in Rochester Riverside, Kent, England

Following Whitbread's £59.5m acquisition of Coffee Nation, a chain of coffee machines, the machines were re-branded as Costa Express. The company planned to expand to hospitals, universities and transport interchanges. In Denmark, Costa Express machines are located in Shell stations; they had previously also been in Shell Canada. In the UK, many SPAR grocery stores petrol station stores have Costa Express machines.

=== World distribution ===
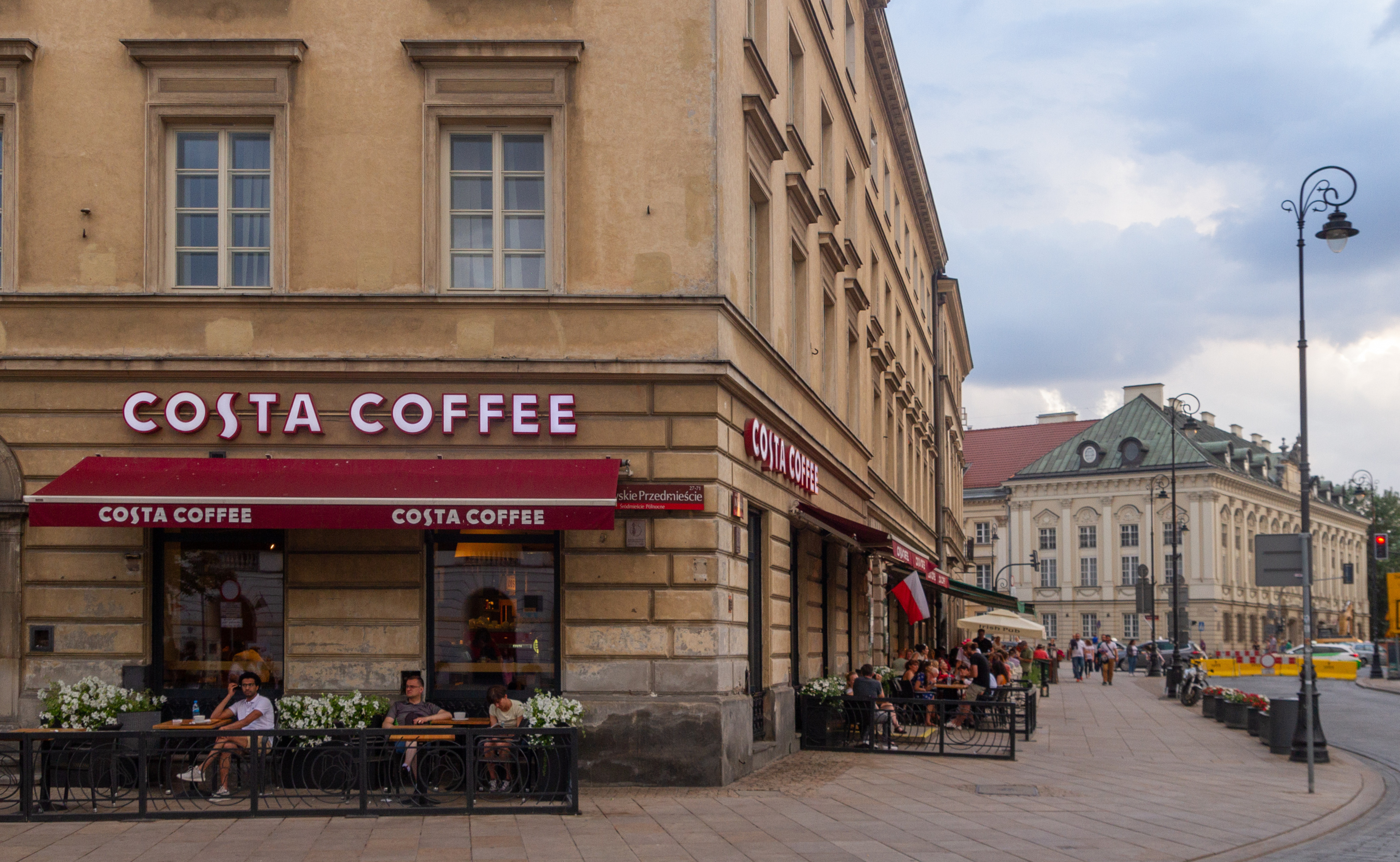
Costa Coffee in Warsaw, Poland

As of January 2022, Costa Coffee was available on four continents in 38 countries, with 3,884 locations in total.

== See also ==
- List of coffeehouse chains
