= John Morison Inches =

Scottish brewer

John Morison Inches (27 February 1903 – 15 November 1985) was a Scottish brewer and brewing executive, who served as President of the Institute of Brewing.

== Life ==
John Morison Inches was born in Edinburgh on 27 February 1903, the son of J. Morison Inches, who was chairman of the Edinburgh-based brewery J. & J. Morison. Inches was educated at the Edinburgh Academy; while he was studying there, his father died and control of the business was taken over by Inches's mother. Inches subsequently attended the Heriot Watt Brewing School before becoming Head Brewer at J. & J. Morison at the age of 22. He became is chairman in 1946, when it was registered as a Limited Liability Company. Along with several other breweries, the company amalgamated with Scottish Brewers Ltd. in 1960, which became Scottish and Newcastle Brewers Ltd.; after the merger, J. & J. Morison stopped operations. Inches sat on the new company's board and supervised the William Younger Brewery, located next door to his former brewing house.

Inches was Moderator of the High Constables at Holyrood Palace from 1943 to 1945. He was President of the Brewers' Association of Scotland from 1947 to 1949, President of the Institute of Brewing between 1952 and 1954, and co-founded the Heriot Watt Brewing Students Association, before becoming an Honorary Fellow the College in 1952; he became a member of its Court when it became a University in 1966. Two years later, he retired from Scottish and Newcastle and went to live in Bury St Edmunds with his second wife, Pamela, elder daughter of J. G. Moore Bell, of Sutton in Surrey, whom he had married in 1969. During his time at J. & J. Morison, the brewers were known for their high-quality training. According to his obituary in the Journal of the Institute of Brewing, when Inches took up a new role at Scottish and Newcastle, "His natural charm and experience did much to facilitate the integrations which followed, particularly in the field of industrial relations and to support the newer band of technologists of narrower training and experience." He died on 15 November 1985.

Preceded by Maurice Vandeleur Courage	President of the Institute of Brewing; 1952 – 1954	Succeeded by John Edmund Martineau
