= Sachem Head Capital Management =

Investment management firm

- Type: Private company
- Industry: Financial services Hedge funds
- Founded: 2012; 14 years ago
- Founder: Scott Ferguson
- Headquarters: New York City, United States
- Services: Investment management
- AUM: US$3.4 billion (April 2024)
- Website: www.sachemhead.com

Sachem Head Capital Management is an American value-oriented investment management firm based in New York City, managed by Scott Ferguson.

The fund was founded in 2012. According to Fortune, Ferguson "tends to be less combative than other activists."

== History ==
Ferguson, a protégé of Bill Ackman at Pershing Square Capital Management, founded Sachem Head in 2012. The name derives from Sachem Head, an overlook in the Pocumtuck Range in New England.

Ernesto Cruz, formerly of JAT Capital and Highline Capital Management, joined Sachem Head in 2013, becoming a partner and an analyst of technology stocks. In February 2017, he left Sachem Head to become a portfolio manager for GIC Private Ltd., Singapore's sovereign wealth fund.

A 2016 article in Fortune noted that while other protégés of Bill Ackman were "struggling," Ferguson was "doing well," outperforming not only Ackman but the market. In 2014, Sachem Head's fund returned 20.5%.

As of January 2024, Sachem Head had approximately $3.4 billion in assets under management.

== Investments ==
Sachem has taken positions in Zoetis Inc., an animal health-care group. A month after CDK Global, an IT provider, went public in early October 2014, Sachem Head became its biggest investor. As of 2016, CDK's stock had risen by more than 80%.

In February 2017, Sachem Head's largest position was in Autodesk, which manufactures 3D computer-aided design (CAD) software, and which returned 7.7% in 2016.

In January 2018, Sachem Head asked Whitbread, owner of the Premier Inn chain in the United Kingdom, "to consider a break up of its Costa Coffee chain from its hotels and restaurant businesses." Sachem Head believed that such an action would "boost the value of its individual businesses."

In February 2022, Sachem Head began a proxy battle with Performance Food Group, which the firm owned an 8.7% stake of. Sachem nominated seven directors to the food distributor's 11-member board, seeking greater influence over the company. In September 2025, Performance Food Group appointed Scott Ferguson to its board following a settlement agreement. Ferguson joined the Audit and Finance Committee amid Sachem Head's calls for the company to explore strategic alternatives, including a potential merger with US Foods.

In 2026, Sachem Head owns 9.9% of IonicDigital, a high-performance data centres company, which rents its digital infrastructure to AI hyperscalers such as Microsoft.
