= Kirby Building Systems =

Company of India

- Industry: Pre-engineered buildings, pre-fabricated steel buildings
- Founded: 1976
- Number of locations: 70
- Owner: Alghanim Industries
- Website: www.kirbyinternational.com

Kirby Building Systems is a manufacturing company specialising in pre-engineered buildings. It was established in 1976 and is a wholly owned subsidiary of Alghanim Industries. Kirby has manufacturing facilities in Kuwait, Ras Al Khaimah, Hyderabad, Haridwar and Vietnam with a production capacity of over 400,000 MT per year. It has sales offices in 70 countries.

== History ==
Kirby was established as a joint venture between Alghanim and Kirby Building Systems Inc. (Nucor), USA in 1976 with a production plant in Kuwait. In 1981, it built the largest textile complex in the world in Alam, Egypt. In 1996, it received ISO 9001:2000 quality certification. In 2000, the plant in Hyderabad was opened; one year later Kirby India received ISO 9001:2000 certification. In 2006, a plant in Haridwar was inaugurated with a capacity of 60,0000 MT. The plant had an investment of Rs 50 crore (500 million Rupees). A year later, another plant was inaugurated in Ras Al Khaimah and construction started on a plant in Vietnam. In 2009, the company reintroduced curved steel structures, an alternative style to other PEB buildings.

== Engineering & Manufacturing Capabilities ==
Kirby centralized its systems, performance, people and products. Kirby has over 500 people using software for designs and structural detailing as part of the Center of Engineering Excellence (CEE) in Hyderabad in India. Kirby has a total of five manufacturing facilities located in Kuwait, Ras-Al-Khaimah (UAE), Vietnam and India, with a total annual capacity of approximately 400,000 MT, supported by over 4,000 employees. The company operates through 70 sales offices located across six geographical regions, including the Gulf Cooperation Council (GCC), the rest of the Middle East, the Indian subcontinent, Africa, Eastern Europe and South East Asia. Globally, Kirby has more than 300 certified builders for the installation of steel buildings. Kirby has manufactured more than 65,000 buildings across the globe, including the world's single largest PEB building, the Renault Nissan factory in India.

== Gallery ==
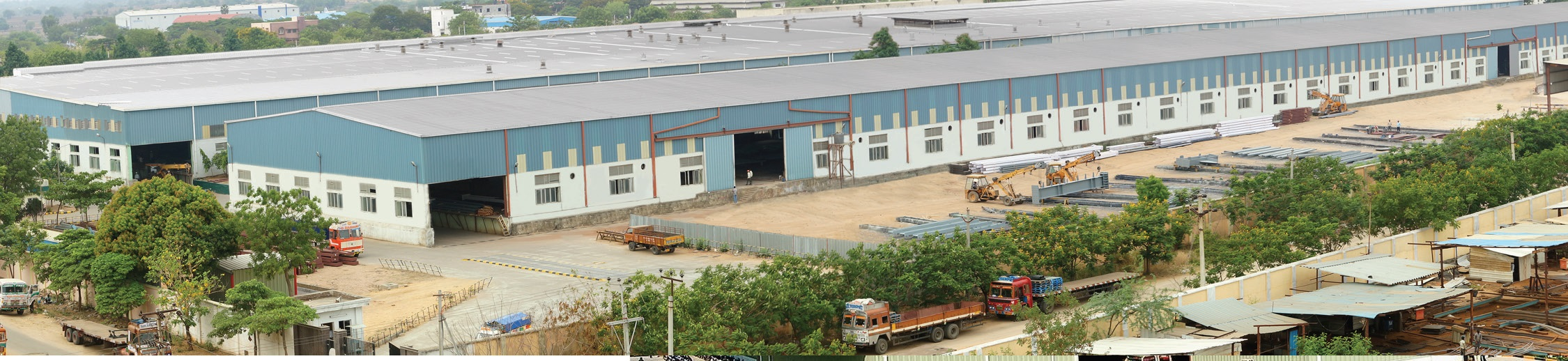
Kirby Hyderabad Manufacturing Plant

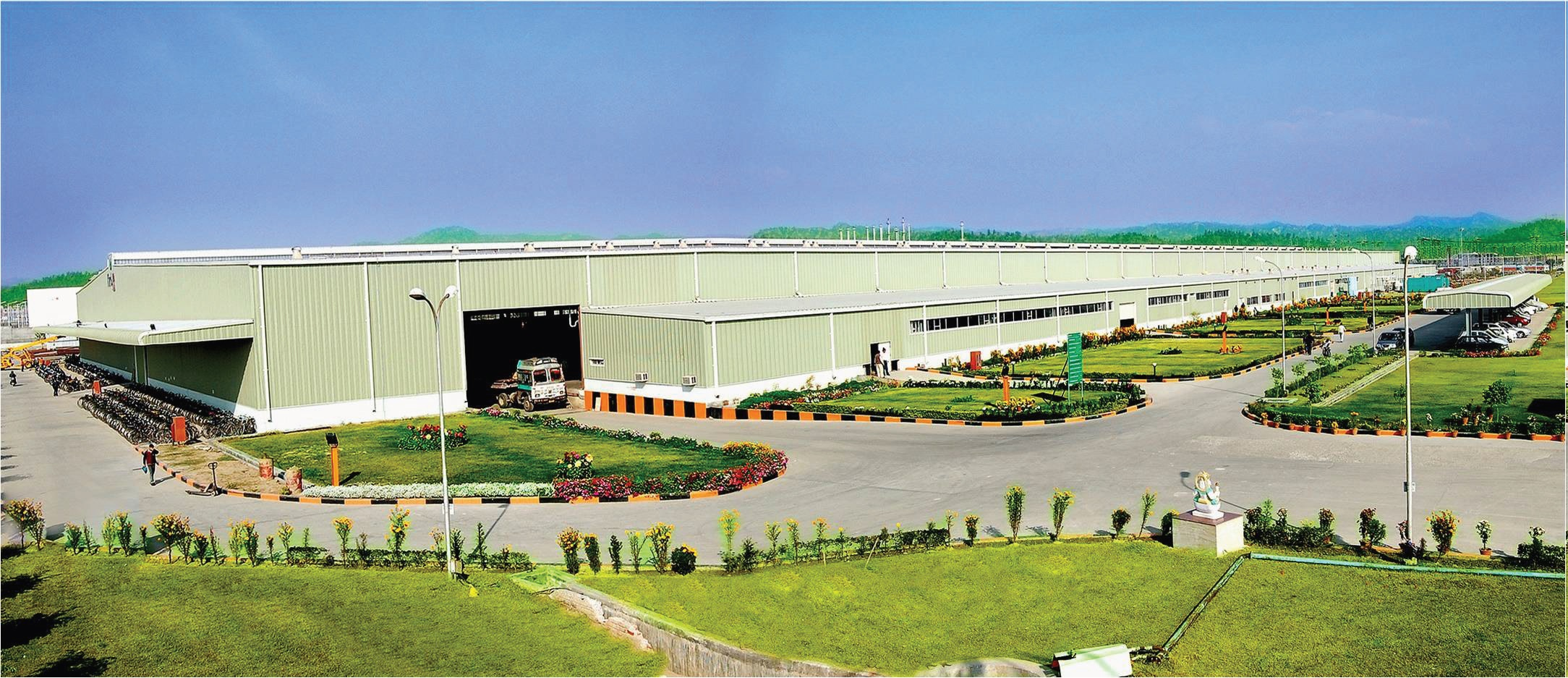
Kirby Haridwar Manufacturing Plant

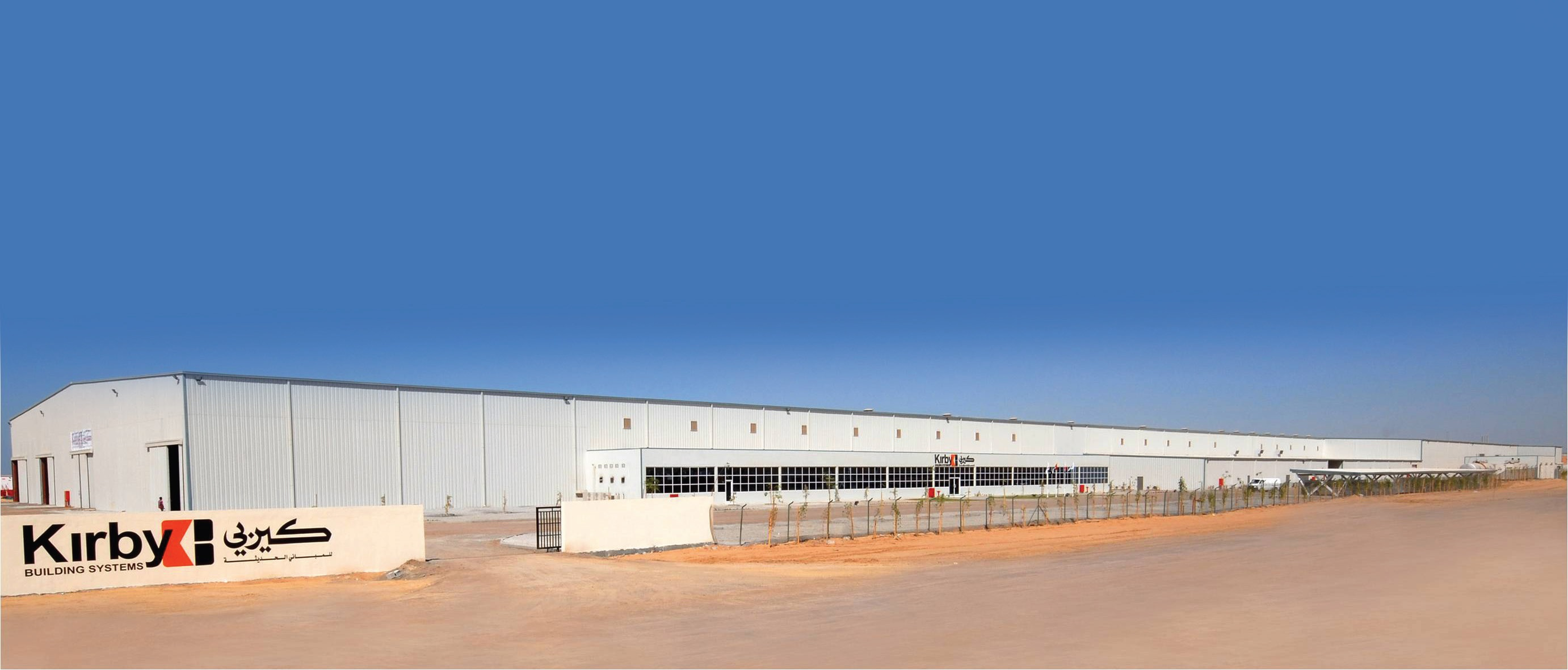
Kirby Ras-Al-Khaimah Manufacturing Plant

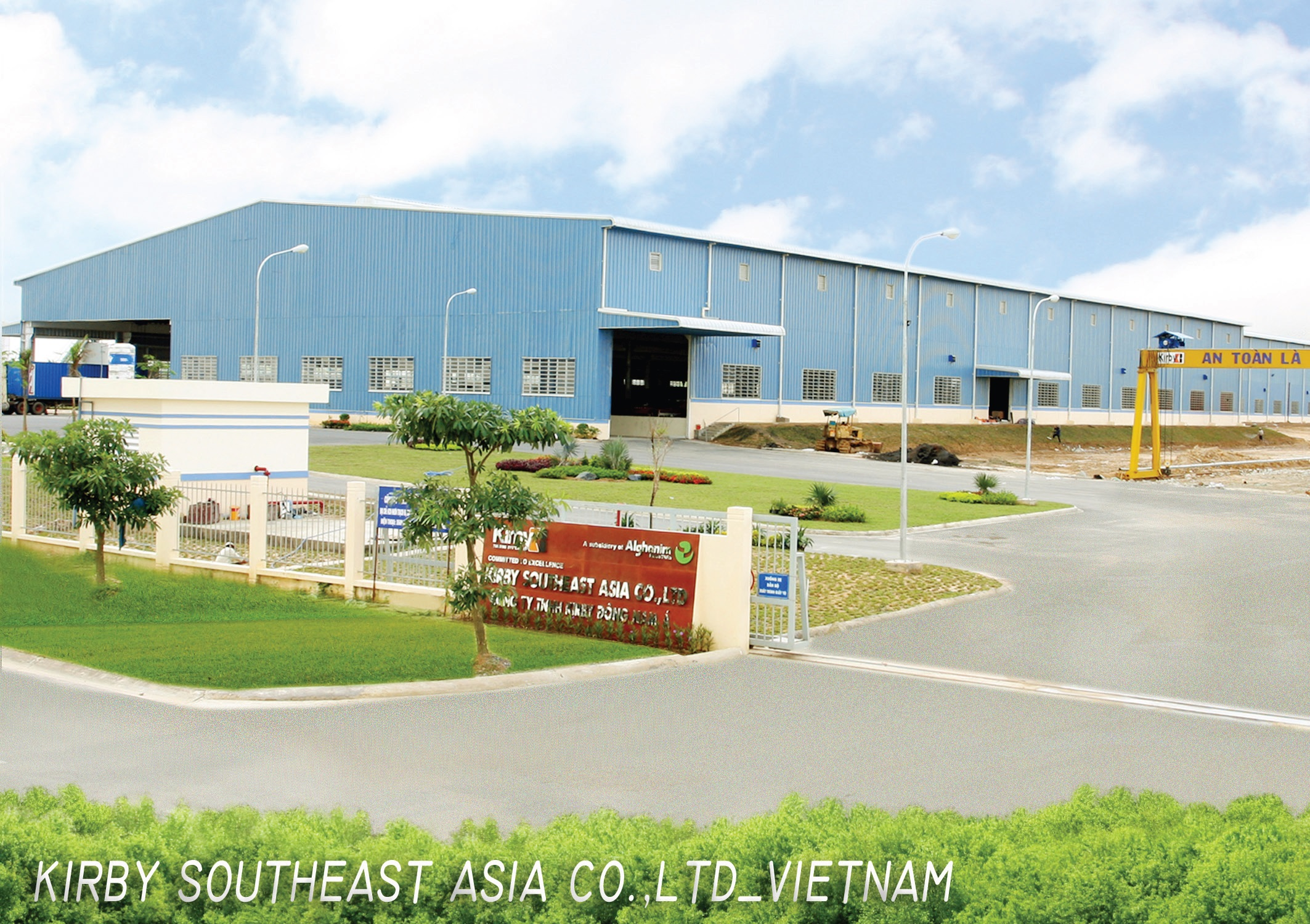
Kirby Vietnam Manufacturing Plant
