= Jill McDonald (businesswoman) =

British businesswoman (born 1964)

- Born: 15 May 1964 (age 62); Birmingham, England
- Education: Sevenoaks School; University of Brighton
- Occupation: Businesswoman
- Known for: Former CEO of Halfords; Former CEO of McDonald's UK; Former CEO of Costa Coffee
- Title: Executive Vice President – Global Chief Restaurant Experience Officer, McDonald's
- Children: 2

Gillian Clare McDonald (born 15 May 1964) is a British businesswoman. She has previously been the CEO of Costa Coffee, CEO of Halfords, CEO of McDonald's UK and head of Marks & Spencer's non-food business, overseeing clothing, home and beauty. She is the current Executive Vice President – Global Chief Restaurant Experience Officer of McDonald's.

== Early life and education ==
McDonald was born on 15 May 1964 in Birmingham, and grew up in Sevenoaks. She was educated at Sevenoaks School and graduated from the University of Brighton with a first class degree in business studies.

== Career ==
She began her career as a graduate marketing trainee with Colgate Palmolive. In 1990, she joined British Airways as a brand manager, and worked there for 16 years, rising to head of global marketing, before joining McDonald's in 2006.

In 2006, she joined McDonald's as chief marketing officer for the UK and northern Europe, and in 2010, was promoted to CEO of McDonald's UK and president of North West Europe. She was appointed to the board of InterContinental Hotels Group in 2013. In May 2015, McDonald replaced Matt Davies (who left to join Tesco), as CEO of Halfords, on a basic salary of £500,000 plus bonuses. In May 2017, McDonald was announced to be taking over Marks & Spencer's non-food business in the autumn, and in her role reported to CEO Steve Rowe.

In July 2019, McDonald left Marks & Spencer after failing to secure an uplift in clothing sales, with Rowe assuming responsibility of the clothing and home division. In November 2019, McDonald was named CEO of Costa Coffee, and started on 2 December 2019. On 13 July 2022, Costa Coffee announced that McDonald was stepping down as CEO of the company to join McDonald's in an international role. Starting on 1 May 2025, she took on a new role as Executive Vice President – Global Chief Restaurant Experience Officer.

== Personal life ==
McDonald is twice married and has two sons.
