= John Edmund Martineau =

English brewer (1904–1982)

John Edmund Martineau FSA (9 December 1904 – 3 June 1982), commonly known as Jack, was an English brewing executive of the Martineau family, who served as President of the Institute of Brewing and as Master of the Brewers' Company.

== Family background ==
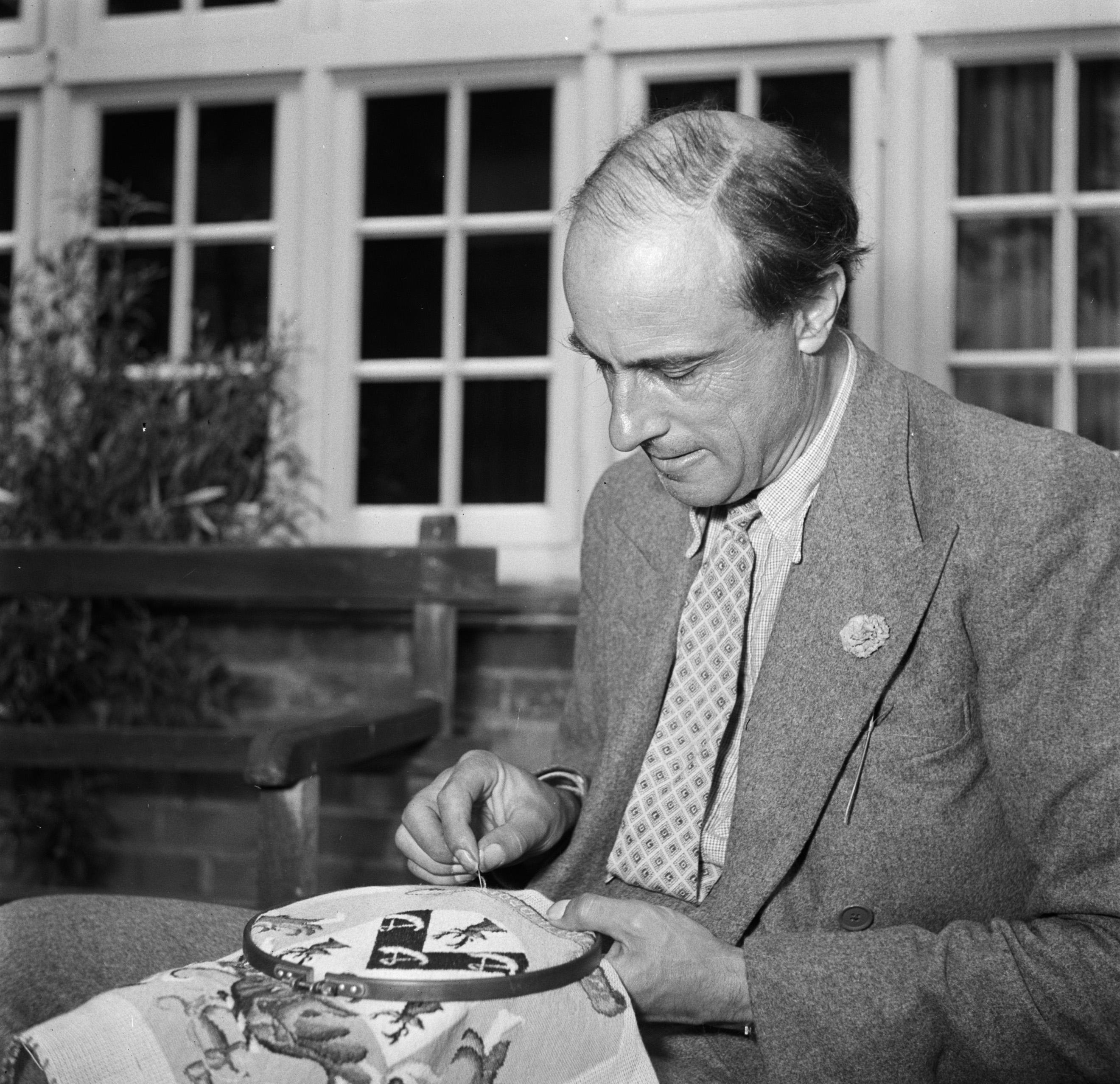
Jack Martineau in 1954 at home, Old Lodge, Taplow, Buckinghamshire

Born in 1904, he was the eldest son of brewer Maurice Richard Martineau JP (1870–1943), of Walsham-le-Willows, Suffolk, and Mary Cator (1868 - 1956), granddaughter of Rear-Admiral Sir Ralph Cator and sister of Sir Ralph Cator, the jurist.

His great-great-great grandfather, surgeon David Martineau (1726–1768), married Sarah née Meadows (died 1800), daughter of Alderman Philip Meadows, Mayor of Norwich, and was father of John Martineau (1758–1834) an early co-owner of Whitbread's after the family breweries merged in 1812. However, John Martineau died in an industrial accident by falling into a yeast vat at the Chiswell Street Brewery in 1834 and his shares in Whitbread passed to his son Master Brewer Richard Martineau JP (1804–1865), who bought the Walsham-le-Willows estate in 1854 and helped found St Mary's Hospital, London.

== Education and career ==
Martineau was educated at Eton and New College, Oxford, where he completed a classics degree. He worked at Mure's Brewery in Hampstead, before joining Whitbread & Co. in 1925 and became managing director in 1931, making him the fifth member of his family to sit on Whitbread's board since it took over the family business, Martineau & Bland, in 1812.

During the Second World War, he served in the Royal Air Force, being promoted Wing Commander and posted to the Directorate of War Organisation in the Air Ministry. After the war, he returned to Whitbread's and was responsible for overseeing research and technical affairs, including the re-opening of its laboratory in 1946. Martineau worked closely with the Head Brewer, Bill Lasman, and the pair tried to apply scientific advances to brewing. According to his obituary, Whitbread's Luton brewery "would never have been built in that matter if not for the training and encouragement they gave to the technical staff".

In 1950, Martineau joined the Council of the Brewers' Society, an appointment which would last for sixteen years. He was Chairman of the Publications Committee at the Institute of Brewing from 1950 until 1954, then between 1954 and 1956, he served as its President and as Master of the Worshipful Company of Brewers for 1955/56. He had overseen the reconstruction of the war bomb-damaged Brewers' Company livery hall as Chairman of the Brewers' Hall Committee. Outside business, Martineau was elected FSA in 1955, and also served as Chairman of the Governors of Dame Alice Owen's School and Aldenham School.

== Personal life ==
In 1936, Martineau married Catherine Makepeace Thackeray Ritchie (1911–1995), second daughter of William Thackeray Denis Ritchie (1880–1964), of Woodend House, Marlow, Buckinghamshire, the only son and heir of Sir Richmond Thackeray Ritchie. Her paternal grandmother was Anne Isabella Thackeray, the elder surviving daughter and co-heiress of the novelist William Makepeace Thackeray, and her maternal grandfather was pioneering social reformer the Rt Hon. Charles Booth.

Dividing their time between homes in Suffolk, Buckinghamshire and London, they had 3 sons and two daughters.

His obituary in the Journal of the Institute of Brewing records that "his heart was especially close to research and to education" in the brewing industry; Martineau was described as don-like and an intellectual. He died on 3 June 1982.

Preceded by John Morison Inches	President of the Institute of Brewing; 1954 – 1956	Succeeded by George Mesnard Parsons
Preceded by Simon Harvey Combe	Master of the Brewers' Company; 1955/56	Succeeded by Peter Pryor
