= Sergio Costa (businessman) =

British businessman (1949–2022)

- Born: 23 April 1949; Borgo Val di Taro, Italy
- Died: 24 March 2022 (aged 72); Monte Carlo, Monaco
- Occupation: Businessman
- Known for: Co-founder, Costa Coffee
- Spouse: Iolande Bertorelli
- Children: 3

Sergio Costa (23 April 1949 – 24 March 2022) was an Italian-born British businessman. In 1971, he founded the coffeeshop chain Costa Coffee with his brother Bruno.

== Career ==
In 1959, Oreste Costa and his family moved from Borgo Val di Taro, Italy to Britain, and brought a traditional coffee bean drum roaster with them.

In 1971, Sergio and his brother Bruno opened a small coffee roastery in London's Fenchurch Street, supplying coffee shops and specialist retailers. In 1978, they built a much larger roastery on Old Paradise Street, Lambeth, where they remained until 2017.

In 1981, they opened their first Costa Coffee shop in London's Vauxhall Bridge Road. By 1995, the chain had grown to 41 UK coffee shops, and was acquired by Whitbread. In 2019, The Coca-Cola Company bought the company for US$4.9 billion, and as of 2023, there are 3,401 coffee shops in 31 countries.

== Personal life and death ==
He was married to Iolande Bertorelli, and they had three children, Monica, Marco and Tania, who have all been involved in the coffee business.

He died at his home in Monte Carlo, Monaco on 24 March 2022, aged 72.
