= Alghanim Industries =

Company in Kuwait

- Type: Joint Stock
- Industry: Advertising and media, Automotive sales and services, Building and home construction products, Consumer credit, Consumer electronics retail, Consumer engineering, FMCG Wholesale and distribution, Food and beverage, Home furnishings retail, Insurance, Insulation manufacturing, Office automation, Oil and gas, Projects engineering, Shipping and transportation, Talent development, Travel
- Founded: Kuwait, (1932)
- Headquarters: Al Hamra Tower, Kuwait City, Kuwait
- Key people: Kutayba Alghanim (Chairman), Mahmoud Samara (CEO).
- Products: Diversified
- Number of employees: 14,000 (2015)
- Website: www.alghanim.com

Alghanim Industries is one of the largest privately owned companies in the Persian Gulf region, predominantly in Kuwait. A multinational company in outlook with operations in 40 countries, Alghanim Industries is a multibillion-dollar company with more than 30 business units under its umbrella. They also fund projects and provide loans for non-UAE/Middle East countries. Alghanim Industries claimed that it collected revenues of $2.5 billion in 2009, although has not disclosed its financial standing since.

The firm has established strongholds in the Middle East, India and Turkey, dealing with over 300 global brands and agencies.

== Alghanim story ==
According to the Kuwait General Department of Residency, the Alghanim family first business was sheep breeding and selling. In the Persian Gulf region, many believed there was the best quality of stock and that is where they gained much popularity and earned enough money to startup a big company. The Alghanim family was among the original families to populate what would become Kuwait and has a long history as merchants in the region.

In 1932, Yusuf Ahmed Alghanim returned to Kuwait from his studies abroad and took over his father's business which he turned into a successful company. By the end of the 1930s, he had established the reputation of the Alghanims throughout the Middle East and was employing a labour force of more than 4000 people. Under the guidance of Yusuf, the organisation grew and diversified over the next 40 years which further entrenched the Alghanim name across the Middle East.

One of the key steps in this expansion was an association with General Motors to introduce American-made vehicles in Kuwait - the genesis of what is today one of the largest GM agencies in the world. During this period, the group became known as Yusuf Ahmed Alghanim & Sons.

From the early 1970s, Yusuf's son, Kutayba, led the organisation and installed a western-style management structure and decentralised decision-making processes. They positioned the company as a diversified multinational corporation, well placed for continued success locally and abroad. In the late 1970s and the early 1980s, the holding company became known as Alghanim Industries with several business units and brands operating under its umbrella. Some of the leading brands that Alghanim associated with include Hitachi, British Airways, Philips, Kirby Building Systems, and Frigidaire.

Throughout the 1990s and following the Iraq War in 2003, the company formed marketing collaborations and strategic alliances with corporate giants such as Xerox, Whirlpool, Haier, Lofra, and American Express. It also continued to open markets within the GCC and expand operations globally.

Yusuf's grandson, Omar Kutayba Alghanim, joined the management ranks of the company in 2002, and served as its CEO from 2005 to 2019. Omar Alghanim was instrumental in driving Alghanim's international growth strategy. Prior to joining Alghanim Industries, Omar Alghanim worked as a financial analyst with Morgan Stanley in London, focusing on corporate finance, mergers and acquisitions in the Middle East. He received his MBA from Harvard and his undergraduate degree from the Stern School of Business.

He was succeeded as CEO of Alghanim Industries by Samir Kasem, a longstanding executive in the company, who served until January 2024. In January 2024, Mahmoud Samara was appointed CEO. Samara brings a wealth of experience from his tenure at General Motors, where he held senior leadership roles across Europe, North America, and the Middle East.

== Today ==
Alghanim Industries holds the agencies for BEKO, Acer Inc, Acer, Yamaha, Sony, Samsonite, Samsung, Siemens, Nokia, Motorola, Kenwood, Fujitsu, IBM/Lenovo, Dell, Casio, Cannon, Daewoo, Electrolux, Compaq, Konica Minolta, Philips, Toshiba, Whirlpool, and Xerox (among others). Brands include Safat Alghanim, Alamana, Yusuf Alghanim Automotives, Wansa, X-cite by Alghanim Electronics, Bumper-to-Bumper, Cruzer, Kirby, Kimmco, Rockwool (India) Ltd, Alghanim Freight, Impact & Echo, Alghanim Travel. Outside of family business, Bassem Alghanim is board Member of the Kuwait-based Gulf Bank of Kuwait, in which Alghanim Industries holds a stake and also is the CEO of the Middle East Capital Investment Company in U.A.E.

In 2010, Omar and Kutayba were accused of hiring a UK based private security firm to illegally hack Bassam Alghanim's email accounts in order to get an advantage in a lawsuit over how to separate the family's assets.

Alghanim Industry has multiple subsidiary companies across the globe including their Family Service office located in New York, NY.

== See also ==
- Gulf Bank of Kuwait
