= Whitbread =

Multinational hotel company

Whitbread plc
- Formerly: Whitbread Holdings (2000–2001)
- Type: Public limited company
- Traded as: LSE: WTB; FTSE 100 Component
- Industry: Leisure; Hospitality
- Founded: 1742; 284 years ago in London, England
- Founder: Samuel Whitbread
- Headquarters: Houghton Regis, England, UK
- Area served: United Kingdom; Ireland; Germany; United Arab Emirates (with Emirates Group)
- Key people: Christine Hodgson (Chairperson); Dominic Paul (Chief Executive)
- Revenue: ▼£2,920.2 million (2026)
- Operating income: ▲£648.9 million (2026)
- Net income: ▼£212.9 million (2026)
- Number of employees: 34,000 (2026)
- Divisions: Premier Inn; Hub by Premier Inn; ZIP by Premier Inn
- Website: whitbread.co.uk

Whitbread plc is a British multinational hotel company headquartered in Houghton Regis, England. The business was founded as a brewery in 1742 by Samuel Whitbread in partnership with Godfrey and Thomas Shewell, with premises in London at the junction of Old Street and Upper Whitecross Street, along with a brewery in Brick Lane, Spitalfields. Samuel Whitbread bought out his partners, expanding into porter production with the purchase of a brewery in Chiswell Street, and the company had become the largest brewery in the world by the 1780s.

Its largest division is currently Premier Inn, which is the largest hotel brand in the UK with over 785 hotels and 72,000 rooms. Until January 2019 it owned Costa Coffee but sold it to The Coca-Cola Company. Whitbread's brands previously included the restaurant chains Beefeater, Brewers Fayre and Table Table. It has not operated a brewery since 2001.

Whitbread is listed on the London Stock Exchange and is a constituent of the FTSE 100 Index.

== History ==
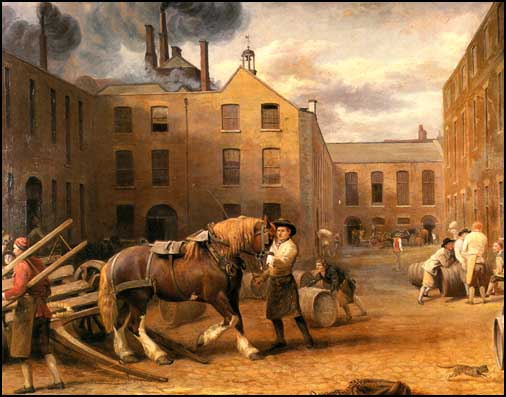
Chiswell Street brewery in 1792

=== Origins ===
The business was formed in 1742 when Samuel Whitbread formed a partnership with Godfrey and Thomas Shewell. They acquired a small brewery at the junction of Old Street and Upper Whitecross Street, along with a brewery in Brick Lane, Spitalfields, which was used for brewing pale and amber beers. Godfrey Shewell withdrew from the partnership as Thomas Shewell and Samuel Whitbread bought the large site of the derelict King's Head brewery in Chiswell Street in 1750. The new brewery was for the specific production of porter, and was renamed the Hind Brewery after the Whitbread family coat of arms.

While not the first to brew porter, Whitbread was the first to exploit it commercially on a large scale. This coincided with an increase in beer consumption in the UK, following regulations to limit the sale of gin owing to the excesses of the Gin Craze. By 1758 production at Chiswell street was 65,000 barrels and the firm had become the largest firm of porter brewers in the UK. From the outset, Whitbread was the leading financial partner, and solely responsible for management, and in 1761, Whitbread acquired Shewell's share of the business for £30,000.

By the 1780s Whitbread had become the largest brewery in the world. In 1796 the company produced 202,000 barrels of porter. The firm struggled after the death of Samuel Whitbread Sr, and saw ownership transfer to his son, also called Samuel Whitbread. The company adopted the name Whitbread & Co. Ltd in 1799.

=== Expansion and social welfare ===
By the 1810s, Samuel Whitbread Jnr (1764–1815) had brought in several new investment partners including his cousin Jacob Whitbread and the Master Brewer John Martineau I (1758-1834). Four generations of Martineau's descendants, father-to-son, would later sit on the board of Whitbread, including John Martineau I's great great grandson, John Edmund Martineau. In 1812, the company merged with the Martineau Brewery holdings and by 1816, leadership was shared between William Henry Whitbread, Joseph Martineau and his father John Martineau I, who died in an industrial accident in a yeast vat in the brewery in 1834. Joseph Martineau became a partner in the business at the time of the merger – the same time as his father John. Three years later, in 1815, annual production reached 161,672 barrels, which at 36 gallons each, equated to over forty-six and a half million pints. Another of John's sons, Richard Martineau, later also became a partner. The business was known as Whitbread, Martineau & Co. until the mid-1840s. By 1860, William Henry Whitbread - nephew of Prime Minister Earl Grey, shared partnership of the firm with John Martineau II (1834-1910) - grandson of John Martineau I and grandson-in-law of Lord Stanley of Alderley.

In her published 1877 autobiography, John Martineau I's niece, author Harriet Martineau, wrote that she had been a guest at "the great Brewery" in December 1831 where she had presented herself "without notice" to her "kind cousin [John's son, Richard Martineau (1804 - 1865)] and his family" at the "great Brewery [where] night after night, the brewery clock struck twelve, while the pen was still pushing on in my trembling hand". She continued: "I was really glad to be alone during those three eventful weeks, - feeling myself no intruder and being under the care of attentive servants".

By 1870, Whitbread had begun producing bottled beers for sale and continued to expand production. On 24 July 1889, the company became a registered limited liability company. In 1914, the firm claimed it was "the largest beer bottler in the world."

By the 1870s, John Martineau II had bought land in Eversley where he had boarded with his tutor Charles Kingsley. This was, as reported by the Bury Free Press in 1902, 'to rebuild cottages and to build fresh ones realising, long before it became the popular cry, that the fundamental basis for improving the health, happiness and morals of England was decent and healthy housing.’

=== Guinness Brewery ===
From 1904, Whitbread was bottling Guinness stout. This cooperation, and rivalry, between the two breweries continued into the 20th century with both firms boasting a Master of the Worshipful Company of Brewers; John Edmund Martineau, the great great grandson of John Martineau, in 1955 and Cecil Edward Guinness, the great great great great nephew of Arthur Guinness, in 1977. In the 1920s Whitbread introduced the Double Brown which was designed to rival Guinness and was almost a recreation of Whitbread's original porter.

In 2000, The Guardian reported that Whitbread was the country's third largest brewer and that Guinness was the largest.

=== 20th century ===
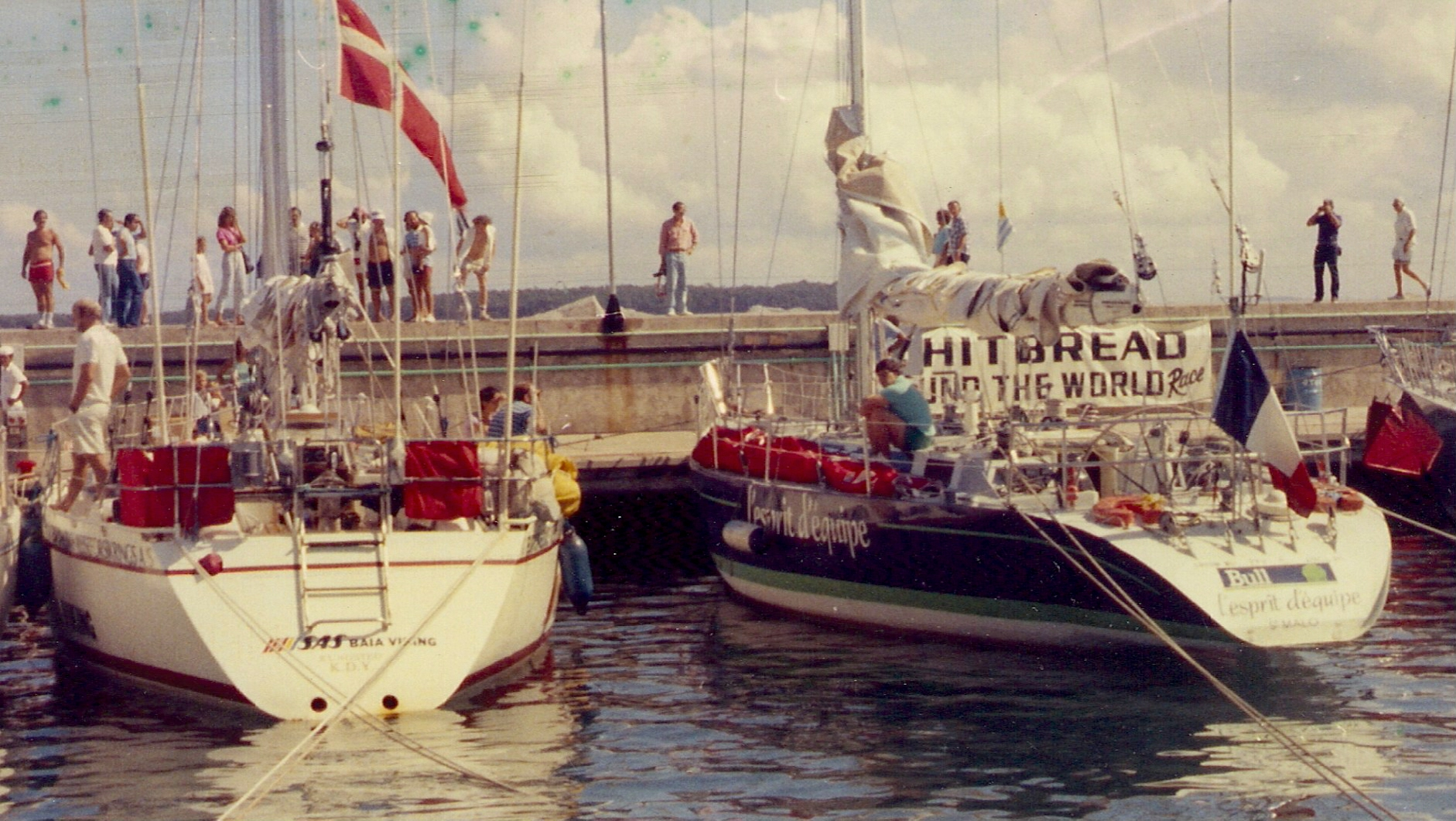
The 1985–86 Whitbread Round the World Race

By 1905, the Chiswell Street brewery reached its largest extent and annual production throughout the company breweries had reached nearly 700,000 barrels. Production decreased during the First World War with Whitbread brewing over 575,000 barrels in 1917.

In the 1920s and 1930s, the company bought out several other brewers, including the Forest Hill Brewery and its pubs, and later the Kent Brewery Frederick Leney & Sons, with 130 of its pubs. The company was also reorganised under the leadership of Sir Sydney Neville and introduced new ales, including Double Brown ale. Whitbread ended regular production of porter in 1940 due to its declining popularity and a need to rationalise its product range following Second World War damage to its brewery sites. 565 Whitbread pubs were also extensively damaged in the war, primarily during the Blitz.

The company was first listed on the London Stock Exchange in 1948 following a decision by the principal owners to take the company public under the direction of WH (Bill) Whitbread. The next three decades saw Whitbreads merged with over a dozen other regional breweries, including Tennant Brothers of Sheffield in 1961 and Brickwoods in 1971. Between 1961 and 1971, Whitbread's output increased from 46 to 160 million imperial gallons (2.1 to 7.4 million hectolitres) and it became Britain's third-largest brewer by output.

In 1971, Whitbread inaugurated the Whitbread Book Awards. The next year, Whitbread became the initiating sponsor of the Whitbread Round the World Race, a sailing yacht race around the world held every three years. Whitbread sponsored the race until 2001. In 1973, the company purchased Long John International, a Scottish distiller whose brands included Laphroaig whisky and Plymouth gin. Later spirit acquisitions, also included the distiller James Burrough and the brand Beefeater Gin which was later sold.

Whitbread acquired a 20% stake in TVS for £6.5M from European ferries in April 1984. By 1982, the company turnover exceeded £1 billion for the first time. In 1984, Samuel Charles Whitbread became chairman and a reorganisation of the company took place into separate divisions; the spirits arm, including Laphroaig was sold to Allied Distillers in 1989.

The company diversified into other hospitality holdings and invested in new ventures in the 1980s and 1990s, including Beefeater, Pizza Hut, Berni Inns, Heineken Steak Bars and TGI Fridays. In the early 1990s, Whitbread was required to sell almost 2,500 pubs, as a result of the Supply of Beer (Tied Estate) Order 1989 (SI 1989/2390).

In July 1996, Whitbread purchased the Pelican Group (comprising 110 restaurants under the Dôme, Mamma Amalfi and, primarily, Café Rouge brands) for £133m, and in November 1996, Whitbread acquired the restaurant group BrightReasons (owner of brands including Bella Pasta and Pizzaland) for £46m.

=== 21st century ===
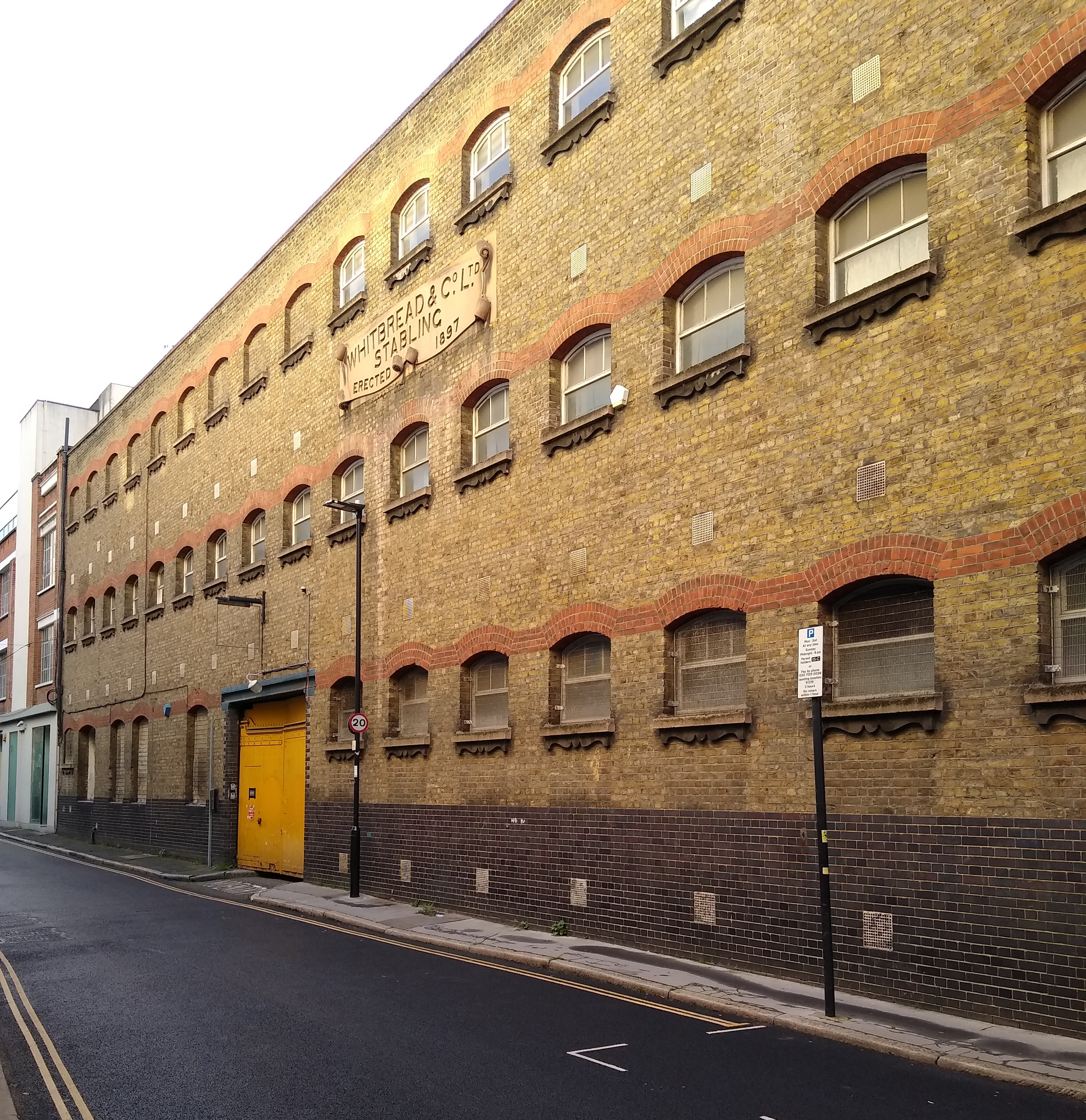
The former stables of the Garrett Street Whitbread Brewery in London (erected 1897)

In 2001, Whitbread decided to sell all its breweries and brewing interests (Whitbread Beer Company) to Interbrew, now known as InBev. Whitbread-branded alcoholic beverages are still available in the UK, such as canned Whitbread bitter, but these are not produced by InBev, but rather under licence by other producers. InBev controls the use of the Whitbread brand and the hind's head logo for use on beverages. In 2002 Whitbread sold its pub estate, known as the Laurel Pub Company, to Enterprise Inns, and sold its Pelican and BrightReasons restaurant groups for £25m to Tragus Holdings (later renamed Casual Dining Group). The Whitbread & Co brewery building at 52 Chiswell Street in London still survives, although beer ceased to be brewed there in 1976 and it is now a conference and events venue. Still named "The Brewery", it was part of the Earls Court and Olympia Group from 2005 to 2012, when it was subsequently sold to a private investor.

In 2005, it moved its core operations from CityPoint in central London, to Oakley House in Luton, and then, in 2006, to larger offices at Whitbread Court in Dunstable. In 2006, it went on to sell 239 of its 271 Beefeater and Brewers Fayre sites to Mitchells & Butlers, who rebranded them into Harvester, Toby Carvery and a selection of other brands.

In 2013, as part of the 2013 horse meat scandal, DNA tests ordered by Whitbread revealed that horsemeat was present in some meat products sold in outlets owned by the company, at the time Britain's biggest hotel group. On 26 February 2013 Whitbread vowed to remedy the unacceptable situation.

In 2018, Whitbread faced pressure from two of its largest shareholders, hedge fund Sachem Head and activist group Elliott Advisors, to break itself up by splitting off the Costa Coffee chain, the theory being the individual businesses would be worth up to 40% more than the current market capital value. On 25 April 2018, Whitbread announced its intention to demerge Costa. On 31 August 2018, it announced that The Coca-Cola Company had agreed to buy Costa Coffee for £3.9bn.

In September 2020, the company announced that they would be cutting jobs, warning that 6,000 staff could lose employment. The company blamed the cuts on a slump in hotel guest numbers since the beginning of the UK's lockdown in response to the COVID-19 pandemic.

Sir Samuel Whitbread died in January 2023 and was the last family chairman of the brewery, who hastened the company’s move from beer to leisure.

In July 2026, Whitbread said that it would close a number of restaurants, including those trading under the Bar + Block, Beefeater, Brewers Fayre, Cookhouse + Pub and Table Table brands, in September 2026. Chief Executive Dominic Paul said the company was forced into this restructure "in light of significant cost increases" including increases in national insurance and business rates. The company expected that 3,800 job roles are to be lost as part of the restructure.

Corvex, an activist investor and hedge fund who as of 2026 owned 6.4% of Whitbread shares, attempted to gain a seat on the company's board, but this was overwhelmingly rejected by shareholders in November 2026.

== Current operations ==
Whitbread's principal current operations are:

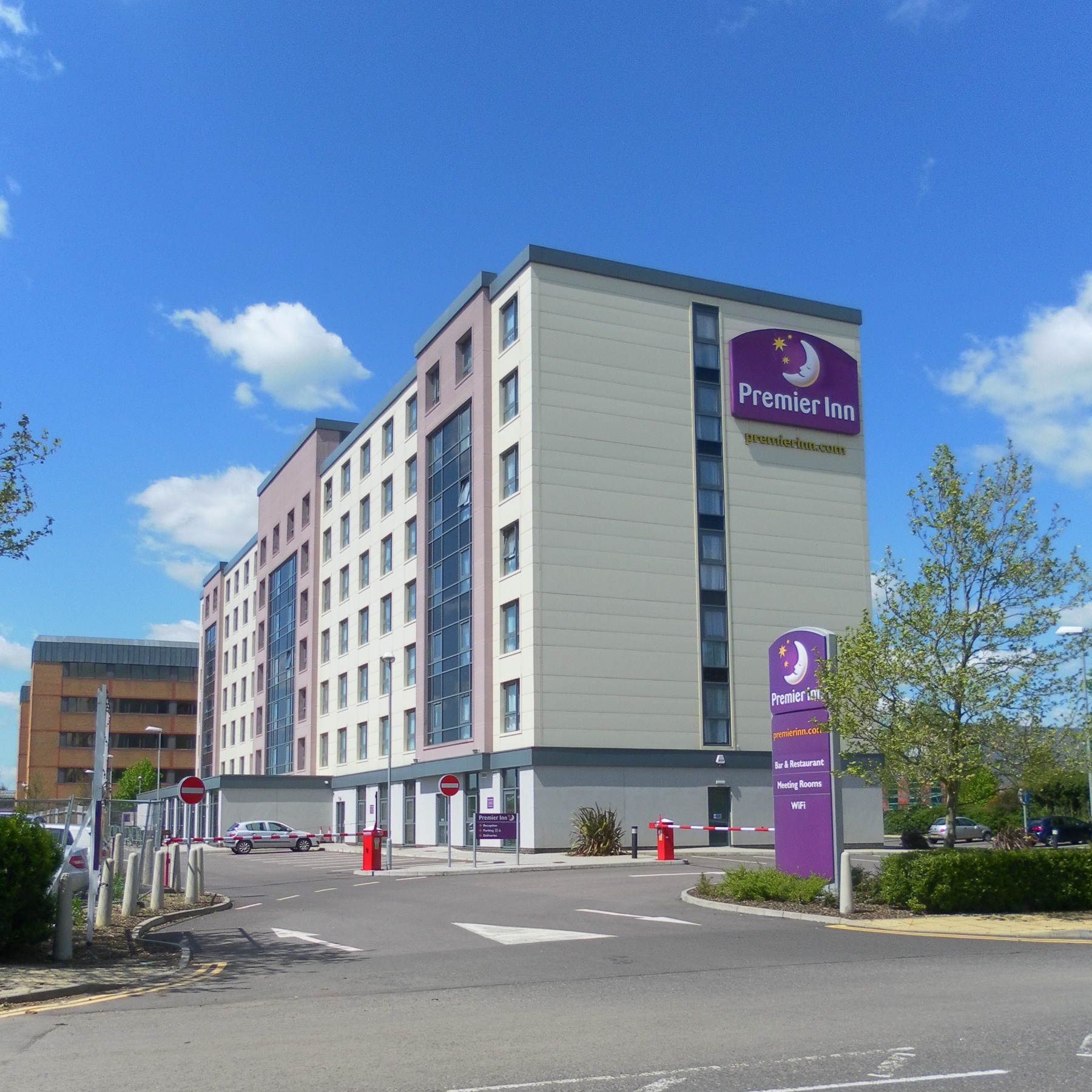
A Premier Inn in Crawley

=== Premier Inn ===
Premier Inn is the UK's largest budget hotel chain, with over 750 hotels.

In January 2026, it was announced that Whitbread had sold nine Premier Inn hotels to LondonMetric Property for £89 million as part of a sale and leaseback transaction. Whitbread continued to operate the hotels under new 30-year lease agreements following the sale. The acquisition increased LondonMetric’s Premier Inn portfolio to 22 hotels.

=== Table Table ===
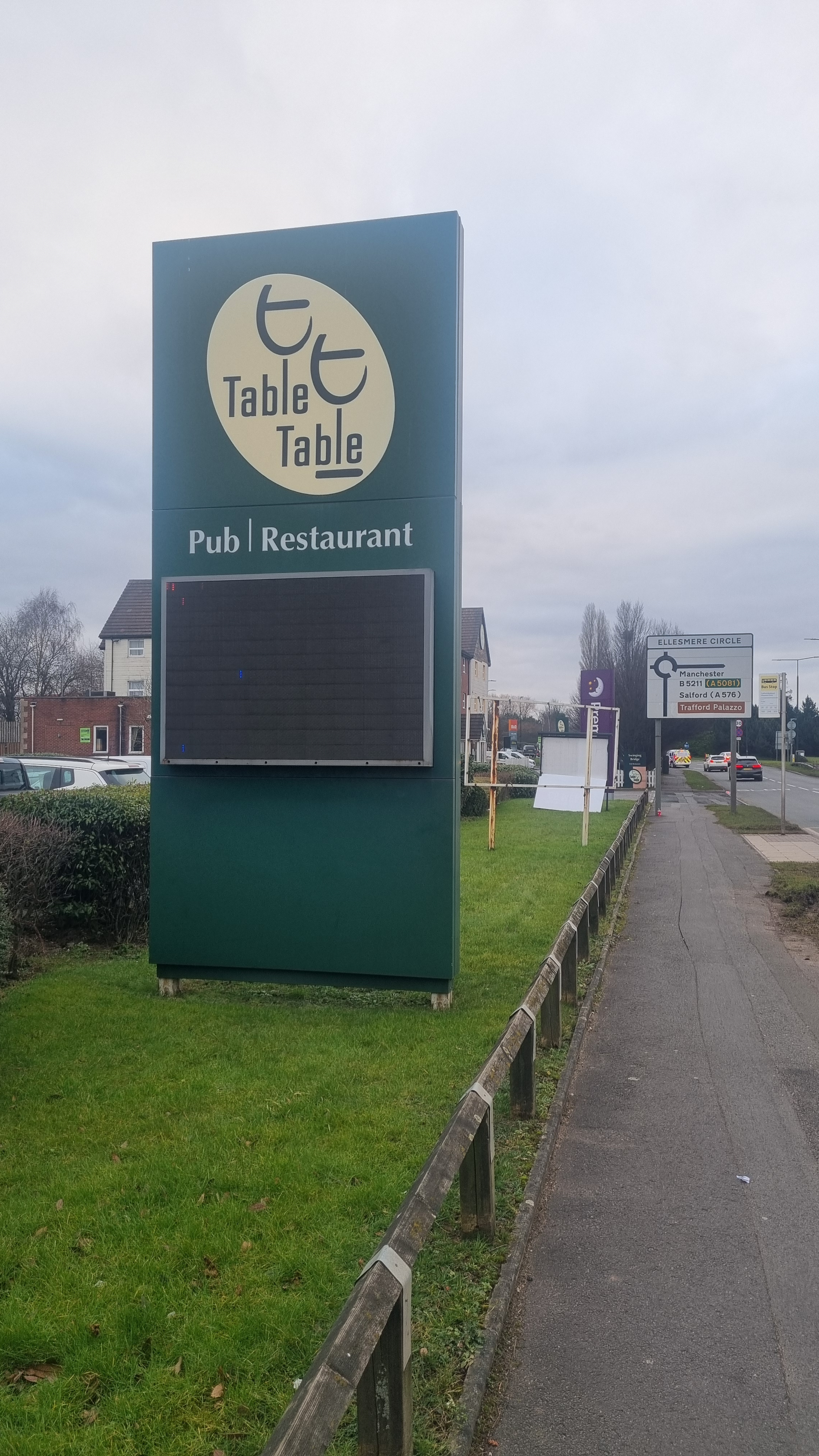
Table Table signage (Swinging Bridge, Urmston, Greater Manchester)

Table Table is a UK restaurant brand. They started as converted Brewers Fayre restaurants. The brand was originally set up, unnamed, in 2006; the name Table Table was launched in May 2008. There are around 100 sites in the UK. All Table Tables closed as part of a restructuring on 4 September 2026.

=== Beefeater ===
Beefeater was launched in 1974. The chain underwent a huge revamp in the early 2000s. It then proceeded to change its name to "Beefeater Grill" for a period but in 2014 reverted to "Beefeater". Beefeater had around 140 restaurants across the UK. In April 2024 Whitbread announced plans to sell 126 unprofitable Beefeater and Brewers Fayre restaurants. It also set out plans to close a further 112 restaurants and convert them into more hotel rooms.

Batches of restaurants were sold off over a two year period, with at least 15 (such as Coombe Lodge, Croydon) being bought by the Papa's Group, and re-opened as a JD Wetherspoons pubs as part of a franchise agreement in late 2025.

In May 2026, Whitbread announced the eventual closure of all their remaining restaurants, including Beefeater. As part of this programme, Mitchells & Butlers acquired a package of seven sites in June 2026. The package included former Beefeater and Brewers Fayre restaurants, which Mitchells & Butlers announced would be converted into Miller & Carter and Toby Carvery restaurants.

All Beefeater pubs are set to close on 10 September 2026 as part of company restructure.

=== Whitbread Inns ===
The Whitbread Inns brand of restaurants was created by Whitbread in 2014. In January 2016 there were 13 pubs (all of which were Table Table) across central and southern England.

== Former operations ==
Whitbread's former operations include:

- Costa Coffee, founded in London in 1971 by the brothers Sergio and Bruno Costa as a wholesale operation supplying roasted coffee to caterers and specialist Italian coffee shops. Acquired by Whitbread in 1995, it had since grown to over 2,861 stores across 30 countries. In August 2018, Whitbread announced that it would sell Costa Coffee to The Coca-Cola Company in a deal worth £3.9bn. The acquisition was completed on 3 January 2019 following a $4.9 billion transaction, with approval from regulatory authorities in the EU and China.
- Brewsters, a brand created in 1999. The emphasis was on families and most sites had been built as Brewers Fayre; this was to give Brewers Fayre a more adult feel.
- Taybarns, an all-you-can-eat American buffet-style restaurant. There were six sites in England and one (the very first site at Swansea) in Wales.
- Britvic, a large UK manufacturer of soft drinks, producing brands such as J2O, Robinson's and Tango as well as Pepsi in the UK and Ireland.
- Marriott hotels and clubs in the UK, sold to brand owner Marriott Corporation.
- TGI Friday's – Whitbread originally held the UK franchise rights to the American restaurant chain TGI Friday's. The restaurants are known for their "over the top" American style and are popular with teenagers for birthday parties. On 17 January 2007 Whitbread announced that the franchise rights for TGI Friday's were being sold to a joint venture between Carlson Restaurants Worldwide Inc and ABN AMRO Capital for £70.4m.
- Pizza Hut UK, sold to brand owner Yum!
- David Lloyd Leisure – Whitbread ran more than 50 David Lloyd Leisure (DLL) clubs in Great Britain and Ireland, with a further number in Spain, the Netherlands and Belgium. DLL is Britain's biggest tennis operator and manages more than 500 tennis courts. On 4 July 2007, Whitbread announced that it had conditionally agreed to sell the David Lloyd Leisure chain to Versailles Bidco Limited for £925 million. Whitbread will initially use the proceeds from its sale to pay off debt.
- Hogshead, a group of town-centre pubs, similar to Wetherspoons, became part of the Laurel Pub Company in 2001.
- Threshers, a chain of off licences.
- Germany: Churasco, owned since 1990, and Maredo, owned since 1994; in 1999 the Churasco restaurants had been transformed into Maredo-branded ones; Maredo was sold in 2005.
- Brewers Fayre, Founded in 1979 and designed to resemble a traditional pub. It was closed in September 2026 alongside all Beefeater restaurants.
