= Coffeeheaven =

European coffee house business

Coffeeheaven International plc
- Type: Public Limited Company (LSE: COH)
- Industry: Coffee stores
- Founded: Poland, 1999; 27 years ago
- Headquarters: Central Europe
- Key people: Michael Ovadenko (Founder)
- Products: Coffee and sandwiches/panini
- Website: www.coffeeheaven.eu

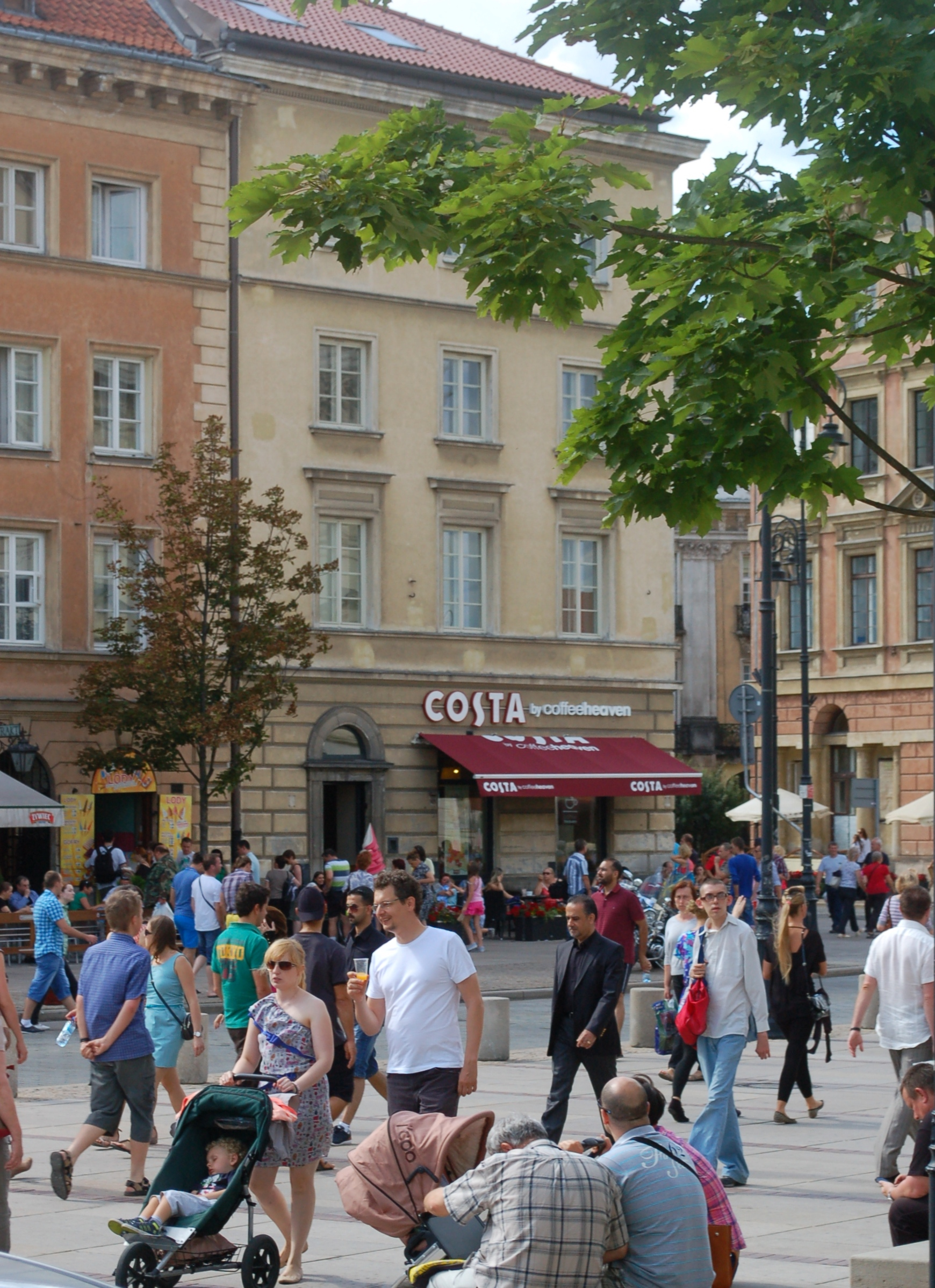
Krakowskie Przedmieście in Warsaw, rebranded "Costa by Coffeeheaven", 2013

Coffeeheaven (stylized as coffeeheaven) is a Central European coffee house business based in Warsaw, Poland. It operated specialty branded coffee/sandwich bars in Poland, Slovakia, Bulgaria and Hungary, with stores in Latvia trading under the brand name Coffee Nation.

== History ==
The company was formed in 1999 in Poland by Michael Ovadenko, with the first store opened in Gdynia the following year.

In December 2001 the company listed on the Alternative Investment Market of the London Stock Exchange, the first Polish-based business to do so. This enabled expansion across Central Europe, with the first store opening in Prague, Czech Republic in 2004, and Latvia in the same year. The company then acquired the seven existing stores of Coffee Nation, expanding to Riga. As of January 2008, the group has 81 stores trading in six countries. Coffeeheaven was one of the first of over 70 leading companies in Poland that are supporters of Foundation for Corporate Social Responsibility.

In December 2009, Whitbread plc subsidiary Costa Coffee agreed to acquire Coffeeheaven group for £36 million. In 2011 all coffeeheaven cafés in the Czech Republic were rebranded to Costa Coffee.

== See also ==
- List of coffeehouse chains
