= Samuel Whitbread (businessman, born 1937) =

British businessman (1937–2023)

Sir Samuel Charles Whitbread KCVO DL JP (22 February 1937 – 17 January 2023) was a British businessman and public servant.

Born in London on 22 February 1937 to Major Simon Whitbread, he joined the board of Whitbread Plc in 1972 and became its chairman in 1984. He stepped down from the chair eight years later and from the board in 2001. He has been chairman of Whitbread Farms Ltd since 1985 and was also a director of Whitbread Investments and Sun Alliance.

Outside of business, Whitbread became a magistrate for Bedfordshire in 1969, served as High Sheriff for the 1973–74 year, and in 1974 was appointed a deputy lieutenant and returned as a county councillor (serving on the council until 1982). He was also chairman and later president of the Mid-Bedfordshire Conservative Association. From 1991 to 2012, Whitbread was also Lord Lieutenant of Bedfordshire, during which time he received three royal visits and two honorary doctorates. He was elected a Fellow of the Linnean Society in 1994 and of the Society of Antiquaries in 2007. In the 2010 Birthday Honours, he was appointed a Knight Commander of the Royal Victorian Order (KCVO).

Whitbread died on 17 January 2023, at the age of 85.
