= Lofra =

Italian company

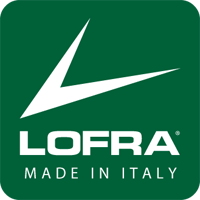
- Company type: Private
- Industry: Home appliances
- Founded: Torreglia, Italy, 1956; 70 years ago
- Founder: Brothers Lovato
- Headquarters: Torreglia
- Area served: Worldwide
- Key people: Reza Salehi (CEO)
- Products: Home appliances
- Website: www.lofra.it

Lofra is an Italian company that manufactures home appliances, freestanding cookers, and built-in ovens and hobs, based in Torreglia in the province of Padua.

== History ==
Founded in 1956 by the brothers Lovato in Padova, Lofra began working producing pots with remnants of war materials.
In subsequent years it started to produce the first heating and wood stoves and finally get to the gas cookers in stainless steel. For a short time, it also produced camping stoves.

From the 80s to the present day the company has produced other than gas ranges cookers, built in hobs and ovens both gas and electric and cooker hoods. Since the beginning of 2010 the company has grown to a new property managed by an Iranian multinational .

Since 2012, after nearly 60 years of production at the historic plant in Teolo, production was transferred to Torreglia, town at the foot of the Euganean Hills.

== Other Activities ==
During the 1970s and 80s Lofra produced prefabricated houses and accessories for the kitchen in addition to home appliances.

== General Company ==
In the past Lofra production was concentrated in Italy in 3 establishments, 2 production and a warehouse of finished products.

Since 2010, as a result of societal problems the company was acquired by a new owner, the historical site was abandoned and now everything is concentrated in a single plant in Torreglia (PD).

== Awards and recognition ==
Lofra sponsors sports events at local level; running, cycling, rugby and volleyball teams.

In 1989 it was awarded of the " Ercole D'oro"; international award in innovation technology.

== See also ==
- List of Italian companies
