= Masters of the Worshipful Company of Brewers =

The Worshipful Company of Brewers is a City livery company, ranking 14th in the Corporation of London's order of precedence. Its origins can be traced back with certainty to 1292, although it probably existed in some form up to a century earlier as the Guild of Our Lady and St Thomas Becket. Its successor, the Mystery of Free Brewers, was granted the right by the Lord Mayor and Aldermen of London to appoint a Master and Wardens in 1406. Henry VI granted the Brewers' Company its first Royal Charter in 1437/38. Until the last century, the Company admitted non-brewers to represent the livery company externally. From the mid-16th century, its Masters have been elected annually; all of those whose names are known are listed below.

== List of masters ==
Below is a complete list of those who have served as Master Brewer since the early 18th century, with most since 1563 being known :

- 1563/64 William Beswicke
- 1565 John Dauldron
- 1566 Thomas Hunt
- 1567 Robert Wood
- 1568 Roger Bellowe
- 1569 Roger Pynder
- 1570 Robert Crippes
- 1571 Thomas Etheridge
- 1572 Thomas Hasilwood
- 1573 Robert Shawe
- 1574 John Harrison
- 1575 Richard Eskridge
- 1576 Richard Platt
- 1577/78 William Beswicke
- 1579 Thomas Hasilwood
- 1580 Humfrey Powell
- 1581 Richard Platt
- 1582 Richard Eskridge
- 1583 Mathieu Merten
- 1584 John Stephens
- 1585 John Treene
- 1586 John Braytofte
- 1587 John Hill
- 1588 Christopher Butler
- 1589 William Freeman
- 1590 John Newnham
- 1591 Robert Ellison
- 1592 Thomas Avery
- 1593 William Maskell (died)
- 1593 John Newnham (succeeded Maskell)
- 1594 Mathieu Merten
- 1595 Robert Ellison
- 1596 Syracke Rose
- 1597 John Newnham
- 1598 Allen Downer
- 1599 William Stratton
- 1600 –
- 1601 Francis Snellinge
- 1602 Thomas Draper
- 1603 –
- 1604 Thomas Hadden
- 1605 James Anyon
- 1606 Henry Draper
- 1607 Thomas Scoles
- 1608 John Hall
- 1608 Henry Draper (elected during Hall's illness)
- 1609 Roger Bellowe
- 1610 Francis Snellinge
- 1611 John Yorke
- 1612 John Willand
- 1613 Thomas Brickwood
- 1614 Peter Browne
- 1615 Jeffrey Spencer
- 1616 Thomas Cutts
- 1617 Thomas Starkey
- 1618 William Harrison
- 1619 John Watts
- 1620 William Stephens
- 1621 Edward Emerson
- 1622 James Desmeistres
- 1623 George Brookeshawe
- 1624 Thomas Blisse
- 1625 Edmounde Morgan
- 1626 Henrie Hodge
- 1627 James Desmeistres
- 1628 William Carpenter
- 1629 William Hoby
- 1630 John Heylyn
- 1631 Samuel Cranmer
- 1632 Francis Zachary
- 1633 John Ridgway
- 1634 Richard Rochdale
- 1635 James Browne
- 1636 Bartholomew Parker
- 1637 Robert Draper
- 1638 Alderman Samuel Cranmer
- 1639 Henry Leake
- 1640 Richard Harford
- 1641 John Garrett
- 1642 Edward Bulkeley
- 1643 John Byde
- 1644 Joseph Jaques
- 1645 John Parsons
- 1646 John Walter
- 1647 Leonard Hamond
- 1648 Stephen Sedgwick
- 1649 Henry Greene
- 1650 Robert Houghton
- 1651 John James
- 1652 Robert Jaques
- 1653 John Box
- 1654 John Parsons
- 1655 Samuel Starling
- 1656 William Hiscocks
- 1657 John Davis
- 1658 Edward Laurence (died)
- 1658 Samuell Starling, senior (succeeded Laurence)
- 1659 Richard Lowton
- 1660 William Carpenter
- 1661 Alderman & Sheriff Samuel Starling
- 1662 William Greene
- 1663 Emery Hill
- 1664 Henry Kettle
- 1665 James Walker
- 1666 Thomas Grimshaw
- 1667 Alderman William Dashwood
- 1668 Alderman John Forth
- 1669 William Bucknall
- 1670 Alderman Daniel Forth
- 1671 Tristram May
- 1672 James Reading
- 1673 Richard Lowe
- 1674 John Collins
- 1675 John Wilcocks
- 1676 Henry Sell
- 1677 Ralph Bowes
- 1678 James Reading
- 1679 Sir Jonathan Raymond
- 1680 John Freeman
- 1681 John Freind
- 1682 Joseph Laurence
- 1683 –
- 1684 William Curtis
- 1685/86 William Carpenter
- 1687 Captain John Perry
- 1688 John Raymond
- 1689 Alderman Sir John Parsons
- 1690 Robert Bredon
- 1691 John Crosse
- 1692 Thomas Eyre
- 1693 James Child
- 1694 John Raymond
- 1695 Matthew Walraven
- 1696/97 Abraham Chitty
- 1698 Major William Woodruff
- 1699 Thomas Freeman
- 1700 Timothy Lannoy
- 1701 John England
- 1702 Edward Godfrey
- 1703 Anthony Bond
- 1704 –
- 1705 Thomas Malyn
- 1706 John Cholmeley
- 1707 Benjamin Green
- 1708 Charles Cox
- 1709 John Clark
- 1710 George Meggott
- 1711 Charles Feltham
- 1712/13 Thomas Cole
- 1714 Sir Robert Bredon
- 1715 Edmund Halsey
- 1716–17 Felix Feast
- 1718 Samuel Mayo
- 1719/20 Joseph Townsend
- 1721 Captain Joseph Bird
- 1722 Thomas Cole
- 1723 Sir Felix Feast (died)
- 1723 Samuel Mayo (succeeded Feast)
- 1724 Joseph Helby
- 1725 Joseph Raymond
- 1726 Rivers Dickinson
- 1727 William Tayleure
- 1728 Joseph Nutt
- 1729 Andrew Crosse
- 1730 Alderman Humphrey Parsons, Lord Mayor
- 1731/32 Henry Johnson
- 1733 John Kroger
- 1734/35 John Wightman
- 1736 Robert Pycroft
- 1737/38 Starkey Mayo
- 1739 Samuel Howe
- 1740 William Pearce
- 1741 Alderman William Calvert
- 1742 William Fuller
- 1743/44 Andrew Hope
- 1745 Charles Osborn
- 1746 Alderman Crispe Gascoyne
- 1747 William Hagger
- 1748 John Scott
- 1749 John Raymond
- 1750 Shardlow Wightman
- 1751 Samuel Dickinson
- 1752 Matthew Dove
- 1753 Joseph Foster
- 1754/55 Henry Willoughby, 16th Baron Willoughby of Parham
- 1756 John Stubbs
- 1757 Daniel Booth
- 1758 Peter Greene
- 1759 Richard Hare
- 1760 Nathaniel Scott
- 1761 William Mason
- 1762 William Raper
- 1763 Charles Hoyle
- 1764/65 William Seward
- 1766 Joseph Dickinson
- 1767 Henry Mason
- 1768 Thomas Curteis
- 1769 John Smith
- 1770/71 Samuel Hawley, 4th Baron Hawley
- 1772 Felix Calvert
- 1773/74 Samuel Hawley, 4th Baron Hawley
- 1775 Andrews Pankeman
- 1776 William Feast
- 1777 Peter Hamond
- 1778 Samuel Hawley, 4th Baron Hawley
- 1779 John Curteis
- 1780 Edward Bond
- 1781 Leonard Hamond
- 1782 John Thornton
- 1783 John Baker
- 1784 Richard Kinnersley
- 1785 John Charrington
- 1786 Edward Barnes
- 1787 Edward Bond
- 1788 Sir Richard Hoare, 2nd Baronet
- 1789 Benjamin Smith
- 1790 Joseph Gascoyne
- 1791 Thomas Richardson
- 1792 Samuel Waring
- 1793 William Truman Read
- 1794/96 Samuel Waring
- 1797 Gideon Combrune
- 1798 Oliver Dickinson
- 1799 Richard Walford
- 1800 Joseph Hale
- 1801 Thomas Smith
- 1802 William Whitmore
- 1803 Joseph Kirkman (died)
- 1803 Joseph Hale (succeeded Kirkman)
- 1804 Harvey Christian Combe
- 1805 James Pulleyne
- 1806 John Martineau
- 1807 Daniel Bell
- 1808 Robert Calvert
- 1809 Sampson Hanbury
- 1810 Robert Kilby Cox
- 1811 John Beardmore
- 1812 Harry Charrington
- 1813 Robert Barclay
- 1814 John Bittleston
- 1815 Joseph Delafield
- 1816 George Hale
- 1817 Timothy Brown
- 1818 Charles Calvert
- 1819 Henry Perkins
- 1820 Nicholas Charrington
- 1821 Charles Cole
- 1822 Joseph Tickell
- 1823 John Vickris Taylor
- 1824 Thomas Fowell Buxton
- 1825 John Forster
- 1826 Charles Barclay
- 1827 Frederick Perkins
- 1828 Nicholas Charrington
- 1829 Thomas Butts Aveling
- 1830 Michael Bland
- 1831 Joseph Martineau
- 1832 Harvey Combe
- 1833 John Donaldson
- 1834 James Goding
- 1835 Joseph Delafield
- 1836 Robert Pryor
- 1837 Robert Hanbury
- 1838 George Matthew Hoare
- 1839 Edmund Sexton Pery Calvert
- 1840 Arthur Kett Barclay
- 1841 Richard Martineau
- 1842 Alfred Head
- 1843 William Delafield
- 1844 Frederick Woodbridge
- 1845 Charles Allen Young
- 1846/47 Samuel Charles Whitbread
- 1848 Charles Charrington
- 1849 John Lettsom Elliot
- 1850 Sir Edward Buxton, 2nd Baronet
- 1851 Henry James Hoare
- 1852 John Manning Needham
- 1853 Hedworth David Barclay
- 1854 Edward Charrington
- 1855 Robert Hanbury
- 1856 Charles Hugh Hoare
- 1857 Charles Addington Hanbury
- 1858 Philip Worsley
- 1859/60 Charles Buxton MP
- 1861 Algernon Perkins
- 1862 James Watney
- 1863 Thomas George Barclay
- 1864 John Samuel Tanqueray
- 1865 Joseph Bonsor
- 1866 Norman Watney
- 1867 Edward Courage
- 1868 Richard Henry Combe
- 1869 William Whitbread
- 1870 Sir Fowell Buxton, 3rd Baronet
- 1871 Robert Barclay
- 1872 Frederick Manning Needham
- 1873 Barclay Field
- 1874 Alfred Henry Bevan
- 1875 Edward North Buxton
- 1876 Augustus Frederick Perkins
- 1877 Charles Combe
- 1878 Spencer Charrington
- 1879 Frederick Lincoln Bevan
- 1880 James Hiscutt Crossman
- 1881 Henry Cosmo Orme Bonsor
- 1882 Richard Worsley
- 1883 John Bagot Scriven
- 1884 Walter Motimer Allfrey
- 1885 George Alexander Bonsor
- 1886 Edgar Lubbock
- 1887 William Hoare
- 1888 Edmund Smith Hanbury
- 1889 Spencer Calmeyer Charrington
- 1890 John Henry Buxton
- 1891 William Musgrave Wroughton
- 1892 Alfred Money Wigram
- 1893 Vernon James Watney
- 1894 Richard Combe
- 1895 George Crafter Croft
- 1896 Sir William Paulin
- 1897 Gerald Buxton
- 1898 Robert Milburn
- 1899 Sir Edward Mann, 1st Baronet
- 1900 Charles Hagart Babington
- 1901 John Mackenzie Hanbury
- 1902 Charles James Phillips
- 1903 Colonel Oswald Pearce-Serocold
- 1904 Claude Watney
- 1905 Hubert Frederick Barclay
- 1906 Granville Bevan
- 1907 Francis Pelham Whitbread
- 1908 Captain Malcolm Cosmo Bonsor
- 1909 Douglas Crossman
- 1910 Colonel Francis Charrington
- 1911 Andrew Richard Motion
- 1912 Henry Fowell Buxton
- 1913–18 Cecil Lubbock
- 1919/20 Edwyn Frederick Barclay
- 1921 Sir John Mann, 2nd Baronet
- 1922 Edward Walter Giffard
- 1923 Percy George Gates, MP
- 1924 John Bradshaw
- 1925 Horace Rowland Hill
- 1926 Major Arthur Bonsor
- 1927 Captain Guy Nicholas Charrington
- 1928 Charles George Field-Marsham
- 1929 Sir Sydney Oswald Nevile
- 1930 Cecil Ernest Wells Charrington, MC
- 1931 Horace Legard Grimston
- 1932 Lieutenant-Colonel Edward North Buxton, MC
- 1933 Charles Armstrong
- 1934 Oliver Vernon Watney
- 1935 Jack Garton Durrant
- 1936 Colonel George Bluett Winch
- 1937 William Henry Whitbread
- 1938 Sir Edwin Venner
- 1939–45 Commander Redmond Walter McGrath
- 1946 John Fowell Buxton
- 1947 Sir Edward Randal Chadwyck-Healey, 3rd Baronet, MC
- 1948 Frederick Hugh Bowyer, MBE
- 1949 Maurice Vandeleur Courage
- 1950 Douglas Peter Crossman, TD
- 1951 Lieutenant-Colonel John Hubert Courage
- 1952 John Arthur Pepys Charrington
- 1953 Walter Pearce Serocold, DSO, TD
- 1954 Simon Harvey Combe, MC
- 1955 John Edmund Martineau
- 1956 Peter Pryor
- 1957 Lieutenant-Colonel William Henry Kingsmill, DSO, MC
- 1958 Alan Lewis Wigan
- 1959 Thomas Brian Bunting
- 1960 Francis George Mann, DSO, MC
- 1961 Sanders Watney
- 1962 Maurice Arthur Pryor
- 1963 Frederick Onslow Alexander Godwyn Bennett
- 1964 Michael George Thomas Webster
- 1965 Edward Raymond Courage, CBE
- 1966 Alan Michael Tritton, DSC
- 1967 Archibald Graham Neale, TD
- 1968 Captain Mason Hogarth Scott, RN
- 1969 Richard Hubert Courage
- 1970 Major Alistair Giles Mann
- 1971 Roger Derek Wise
- 1972 Edward Hamilton Fleetwood Fuller
- 1973 Robert Harold Soames
- 1974 Sir Gerald Bowers Thorley, TD
- 1975 Christopher John Mytton Downes
- 1976 Major Lewis John Turner, TD
- 1977 Cecil Edward Guinness
- 1978 Benjamin John Hanbury
- 1979 Henry Charles Whitbread
- 1980 Roderick Pryor
- 1981 Sir Keith Stanley Showering
- 1982 David John Simonds
- 1983 Stanley Gordon Grinstead
- 1984 Bernard Crook Kilkenny
- 1985 John Staley Fox
- 1986 Anthony Gerard Fleetwood Fuller
- 1987 Sir Derrick Holden-Brown
- 1988 Sir Charles Henderson Tidbury
- 1989 Michael Noel Francis Cottrell
- 1990 Peter Woodgate Lipscomb
- 1991 Thomas fflorance Barrow Young
- 1992 Michael Garwood Delahooke
- 1993 John Henry Morgan
- 1994 Michael John Griffiths
- 1995 Robert Ian Turner
- 1996 Michael Rodney Mordaunt Foster
- 1997 Stephen Hatton Wingfield Digby
- 1998 Christopher John Rolph Pope, TD, DL
- 1999 Robert Harry Beale Neame, CBE, DL
- 2000 John Hayward Wells, DL
- 2001 William Richard Lees-Jones, TD, DL
- 2002 Thomas David Mure Hart
- 2003 Hugh William Whitbread
- 2004 Richard Anthony Spencer Everard, DL
- 2005 Christopher Peter Lees-Jones
- 2006 Timothy James Mortimer Turner
- 2007 Martin Duncan Thomas
- 2008 Christopher Michael Brain, DL
- 2009 Anthony Christopher Mair
- 2010 Nigel John Bewley Atkinson, DL
- 2011 David George Fossett Thompson
- 2012 Mark John Michael Woodhouse
- 2013 Stephen Frederick Goodyear
- 2014 James Rixon Arkell, TD, DL
- 2015 Miles Anthony Jenner, DL
- 2016 Peter Horatio Cecil Furness-Smith
