= Brickwood baronets =

Extinct baronetcy in the Baronetage of the United Kingdom

The Brickwood Baronetcy, of Portsmouth, was a title in the Baronetage of the United Kingdom. It was created on 29 June 1927 for Sir John Brickwood, chairman and managing director of Brickwood & Co Ltd, brewers, and chairman of the Portsmouth chamber of commerce. Brickwood had previously been knighted on 5 July 1904. The title became extinct on the death of his son from his third marriage, the third Baronet (who had succeeded his half-brother in 1974), in 2006.

== Brickwood baronets, of Portsmouth (1927–2006) ==
- Sir John Brickwood, 1st Baronet (1852–1932)
- Sir Rupert Redvers Brickwood, 2nd Baronet (1900–1974)
- Sir Basil Graeme Brickwood, 3rd Baronet (1923–2006)

== Brickwoods Brewery ==
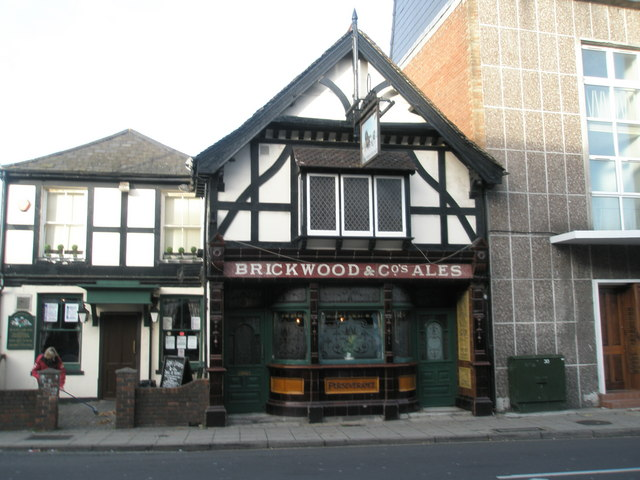
A mock tudor example of a Brickwood & Co pub owned by the Brickwood baronets and their family

The Brickwood family had a long history in brewing, beginning in 1851 with an early brewery (the Cobden Arms Brewery on Arundel Street, Portsmouth) and then from 1891, formally under the name Brickwood & Co Ltd. Their principal brewery was constructed in 1902 in Portsmouth and was named the Portsmouth Brewery (itself closing in 1983). During the late 19th and early 20th century, the family firm acquired numerous local brewers in and around Hampshire. In 1974, the company changed its name to Brickwoods Ltd. By the 1970s, the company owned a large brewing operation and 675 pubs which were sold to Whitbread in 1971 by Sir Basil Graeme Brickwood and family.

== Portsmouth Football Club ==
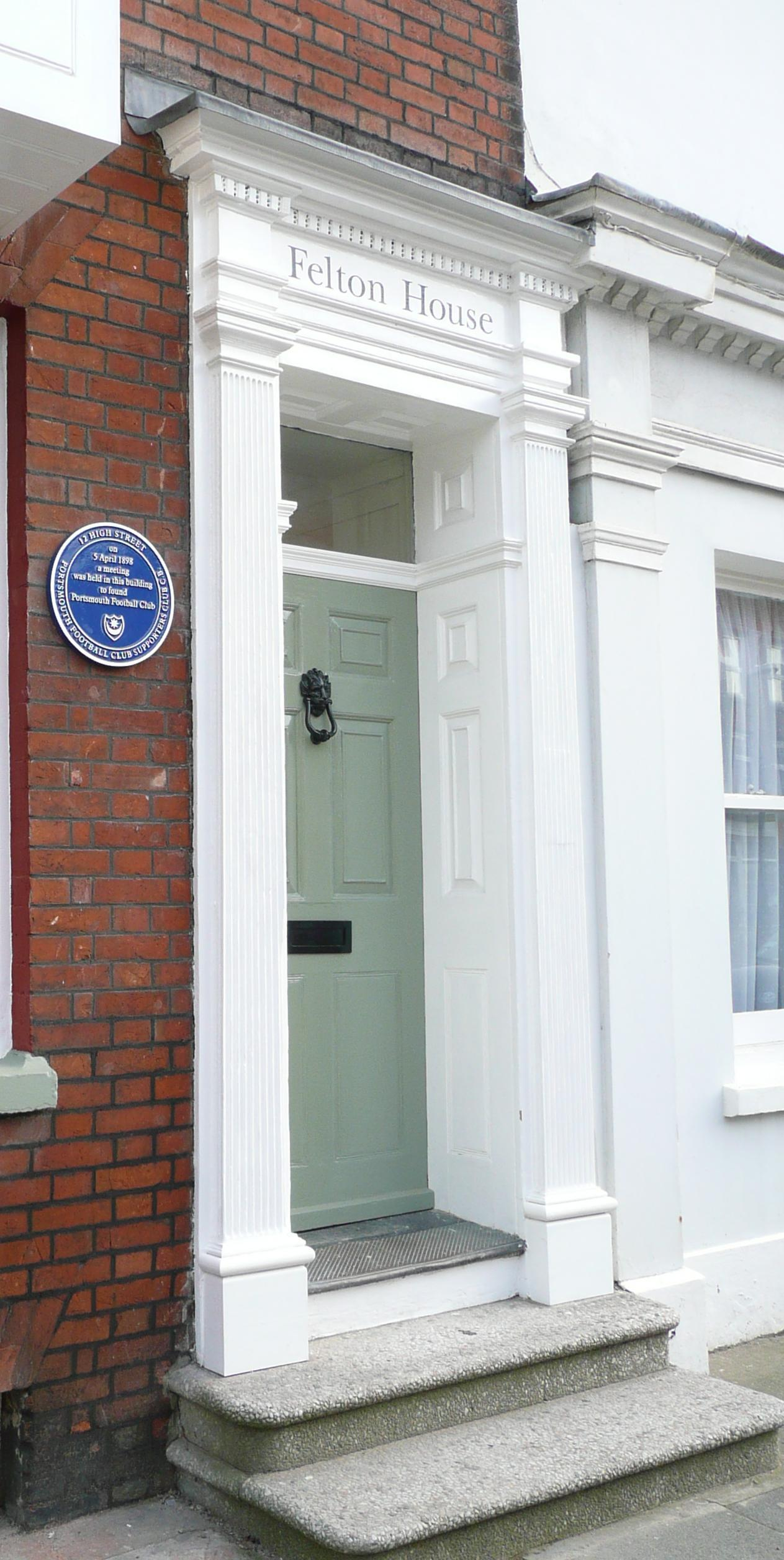
12 High Street, Old Portsmouth

John Brickwood (1852-1932) and six local businessmen met at 12 High Street in Old Portsmouth on 5 April 1898 to pool their resources to form Portsmouth Football Club. 12 High Street was the office of John Edward Pink, John Brickwood's solicitor. Brickwood became the club's first chairman and oversaw the growth of the club until 1912 when the original Portsmouth Football Club was dissolved and reformed to clear large debts. Brickwood was succeeded as chairman in 1912 by George Lewin Oliver, a fellow founding director of Portsmouth Football Club.

== Brickwoods Field Gun competition ==
The Brickwoods Field gun competition started in 1907 after Sir John Brickwood (1852-1932) donated a magnificent Trophy to the Royal Navy. The Brickwoods Trophy competition, as it became known, involved teams only from the Portsmouth area. The Brickwood Trophy competition differs to the more famous Command Field Gun competitions that were held during the Royal Tournament up until 1999, the Brickwood Trophy competition course has no obstacles and is run on a shorter flat track. The Brickwood Trophy competition continues to be competed for on an annual basis at HMS Collingwood as part of the HMS Collingwood Open day.
