= List of people educated at Dame Alice Owen's School =

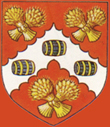
The logo of Dame Alice Owen's School

Dame Alice Owen's School is a partially selective secondary school and sixth form with academy status located in Potters Bar, Hertfordshire in southern England. The school was founded in Islington as a boys' school for 30 students in 1613, which makes the school one of the oldest in the United Kingdom. It is named after its founder, the 17th-century philanthropist Alice Owen. Over time, the boys' school expanded. A girls' school was built in 1886, and the two were merged into a mixed school in 1973; after this, the school moved to its current location gradually between 1973 and 1976.

== Pupils ==
- Arthur Blok (1882–1974), English first administrative head of the Technion – Israel Institute of Technology
- Kacey Clarke, actress
- Suzanne Cox, TV presenter, Gladiator
- Gabrielle Jupp, Senior British Gymnastics Champion (2013)
- Paul Robinson, formerly played for AFC Wimbledon
- Fiona Wade, actress
- Al Fletcher, Drummer for the metal band Die So Fluid, Lee “Scratch” Perry, Jamaican reggae superstar (2003) and for ska legends The Selector.
- Jodie Williams, sprinter for Great Britain
- Ambika Mod, actress
- Cariad Lloyd, Comedian
- Isabelle Boffey, middle-distance runner

=== Grammar schools in Islington ===
- Owen Aaronovitch, TV actor
- Joss Ackland, film actor
- Tony Ball, Chairman of Kabel Deutschland and Chief Executive of BSkyB, 1999–2003
- Ronald Chamberlain, Labour MP for Norwood, 1945–50
- Leslie Reginald Cox, palaeontologist
- Harold Darke, English composer and organist
- Edmund Dell, politician and businessman
- Florence Desmond, actress
- Chris Foreman, guitarist of the band Madness
- Gary Kemp, singer, songwriter, musician in new wave band Spandau Ballet and actor
- William Foyle, founder of Foyles bookshop
- Dame Mary Glen-Haig CBE, gold-medal-winning fencer at the 1950 and 1954 editions of the Commonwealth Games
- Prof Frederick Gugenheim Gregory, Professor of Plant Physiology, 1937–58 at Imperial College London
- Professor Sir Theodore Gregory, Professor of Economics at the London School of Economics
- Dame Beryl Grey CBE, Prima Ballerina, 1941–57 with the Sadler's Wells Ballet; Artistic Director, 1968–79 of the London Festival Ballet
- Prof Peter Jupp, former Professor of History at Queen's University Belfast
- Edmond Xavier Kapp, British artist
- Alan Keith, broadcaster who presented Your Hundred Best Tunes for 44 years
- Most Rev Alan John Knight, Archbishop of the West Indies, 1950–79
- Arnold Lynch, engineer, designed Colossus computer during World War II
- Millie Miller, Labour MP, 1974–77 for Ilford North, and Leader of Camden Council, 1971–3
- David Nabarro, co-discoverer of the causes of African trypanosomiasis (sleeping sickness) and former president of the Association of Clinical Pathologists
- Prof David Newman OBE, Professor of Political Geography and Dean of the Faculty of Humanities and Social Sciences at Ben-Gurion University of the Negev
- Prof Leslie Orgel, Professor of Chemistry 1964–2007 at the University of California, San Diego and Salk Institute for Biological Studies, known for Orgel's rule
- Sir Alan Parker, film director
- Louis van Praag, fashion designer
- Denis Richards, historian
- Andrew Rothstein, Marxist historian and journalist
- Rev Prof Ernest Gordon Rupp, Dixie Professor of Ecclesiastical History, 1968–77 at the University of Cambridge
- Jessica Tandy, Oscar-winning actress
- Geoff Travis, founder of Rough Trade Records
- Ronnie Waldman, television executive
- Tom Watt, actor

== Teachers ==
- Alan Amos (born 1952), politician, Conservative MP for Hexham, 1987-1992 (head of the school's economics and politics department, 1976–84)
- Michael Duane (1915–1997), teacher known for his progressive views on education (taught at the school 1939–40, then in 1946)
- Dame Helen Metcalf (1946–2003), headteacher of Chiswick Community School, 1998-2001 (taught history at Dame Alice Owen's School, 1971–75)
- Reg Tricker (1904–1990), footballer who played for Arsenal (head of sports at the school)
