= Jack W. Szostak =

American biologist

Jack Szostak FRS
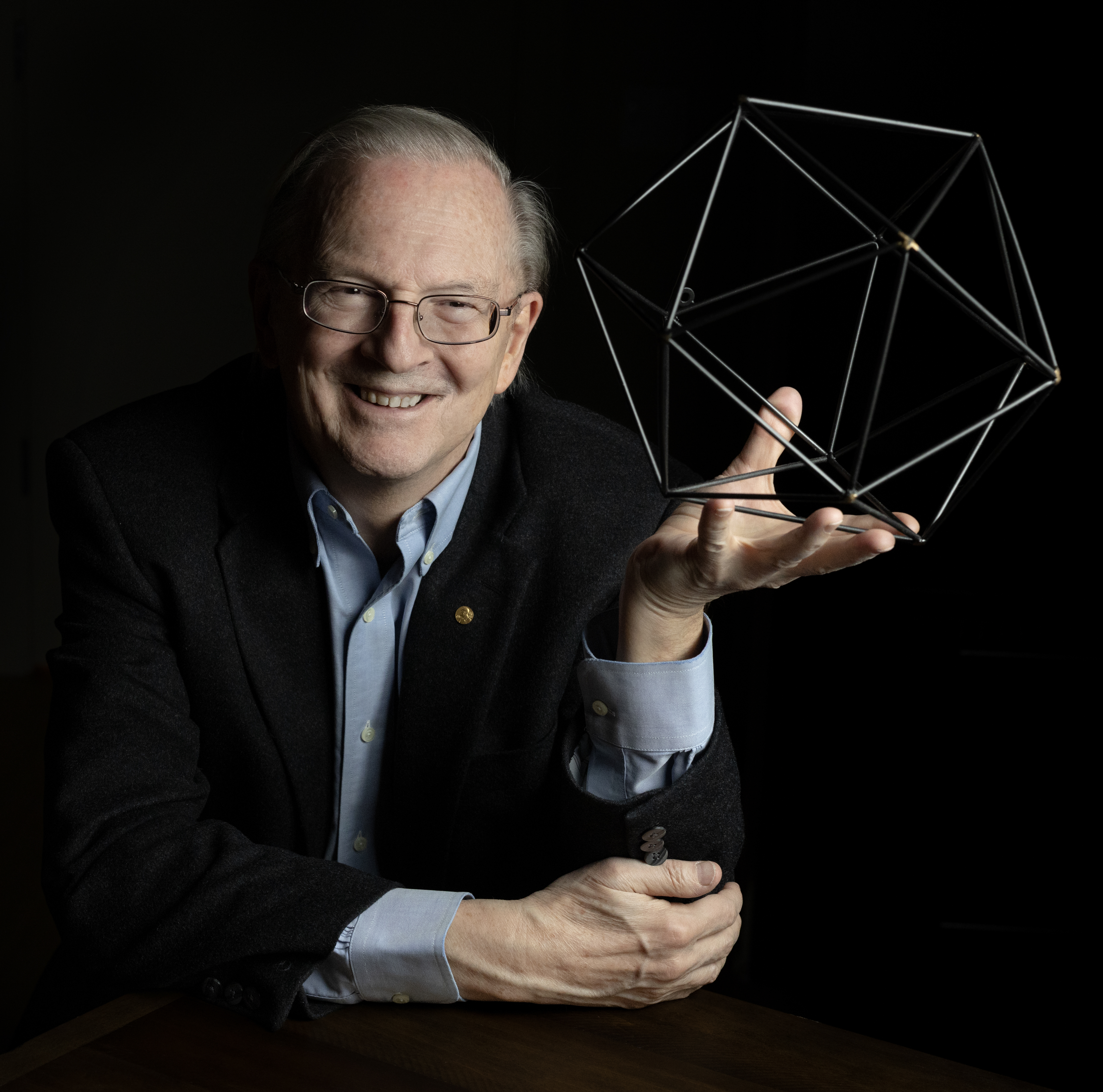
- Szostak at his home in 2025
- Born: Jack William Szostak; November 9, 1952 (age 73); London, England
- Education: McGill University (BSc); Cornell University (PhD)
- Awards: Nobel Prize for Physiology or Medicine (2009); Lasker Award (2006); NAS Award in Molecular Biology (1994)
- Scientific career
- Fields: Biochemistry; Genetics; Synthetic biology Bioengineering
- Workplaces: University of Chicago (2022); Harvard Medical School; Howard Hughes Medical Institute
- Thesis: Specific binding of a synthetic oligonucleotide to the yeast iso-1 cytochrome c̲ mRNA and gene (1977)
- Doctoral advisor: Ray Wu
- Notable students: David Bartel; Jennifer Doudna; Hiroaki Suga; Terry Orr-Weaver
- Website: voices.uchicago.edu/szostaklab/

Jack William Szostak FRS (born November 9, 1952) is a Canadian American biologist of Polish British descent, Nobel Prize laureate, university professor at the University of Chicago, former professor of genetics at Harvard Medical School, and Alexander Rich Distinguished Investigator at Massachusetts General Hospital, Boston.

Szostak has made significant contributions to the field of genetics. His achievement helped scientists to map the location of genes in mammals and to develop techniques for manipulating genes.

His research findings in this area are also instrumental to the Human Genome Project. He was awarded the 2009 Nobel Prize for Physiology or Medicine, along with Elizabeth Blackburn and Carol W. Greider, for the discovery of how chromosomes are protected by telomeres.

== Early life and education ==
Szostak grew up in Montreal and Ottawa. Although Szostak does not speak Polish, he stated in an interview with Wprost weekly that he remembers his Polish roots. He attended Riverdale High School (Quebec) and graduated at the age of 15 with the scholars prize. He graduated with a B.Sc in cell biology from McGill University at the age of 19. In 1970, as an undergraduate, he participated in The Jackson Laboratory's Summer Student Program under the mentorship of Dr. Chen K. Chai. He completed his PhD in biochemistry at Cornell University (advisor Prof. Ray Wu) before moving to Harvard Medical School to start his own lab at the Sidney Farber Cancer Institute. He credits Ruth Sager for giving him his job there when he had little yet to show. In 1984 Howard Goodman recruited him to Massachusetts General Hospital and the Department of Molecular Biology. He was granted tenure and a full professorship at Harvard Medical School in 1988. In 2022, he moved to the University of Chicago as a university professor in the Department of Chemistry and the college.

== Research and career ==
Szostak is credited with the construction of the world's first yeast artificial chromosome, important in mapping the location of genes in mammals and to develop techniques for manipulating genes.

His discoveries have helped to clarify the events that lead to chromosomal recombination—the reshuffling of genes that occurs during meiosis—and the function of telomeres, the specialized DNA sequences at the tips of chromosomes.

In the early 90s his laboratory shifted its research direction and focused on studying RNA enzymes, which had been recently discovered by Cech and Altman. He developed the technique of in vitro evolution of RNA (also developed independently by Gerald Joyce) which enables the discovery of RNAs with desired functions through successive cycles of selection, amplification and mutation. He isolated the first aptamer (term he used for the first time). He isolated RNA enzymes with RNA ligase activity directly from random sequence (project of David Bartel).

His lab focuses on the challenges of understanding the origin of life on Earth, and the construction of artificial cellular life in the laboratory. They have conducted detailed studies of mechanisms by which RNA templates may have replicated on early Earth before the emergence of enzyme catalysts. In particular, they have focused on imidazole-activated ribonucleotides (phosphorimidazolides) as monomers capable of elongating a new RNA strand. Significantly, the Szostak group discovered that phosphorimidazolide-mediated template elongation occurs via 5'-5'-imidazolium bridged dinucleotide intermediates which accelerate polymerization. Phosphorimidazolides were first proposed to be critical for early-Earth nucleotide polymerization by Leslie E. Orgel and colleagues. Szostak and Katarzyna Adamala demonstrated that the issues of a degrading effect of magnesium ions on RNA and the disruption of a fatty acid membrane by magnesium ions can be simultaneously solved by the presence of weak cation chelator like citric acid in primitive protocells.

Szostak developed functional information, a concept for quantifying the information content of biological molecules, such as DNA or RNA, based on their function.

In September 2022, Szostak joined the faculty of the University of Chicago as university professor, leading a new interdisciplinary program called the Origins of Life Initiative.

Szostak is also an important advocate for caution regarding the potential development of mirror life, having published a commentary in Science in December 2024.

=== Awards and honours ===
Szostak has received several awards and honours for his contributions. He is a member of the National Academy of Sciences, American Academy of Arts and Sciences and New York Academy of Sciences, the American Philosophical Society, and is a member of the Kosciuszko Foundation Collegium of Eminent Scientists of Polish Origin and Ancestry.

He has received the following awards:

- United States National Academy of Sciences Award in Molecular Biology in 1994
- Hans Sigrist Prize, University of Bern, Switzerland, in 1997
- Genetics Society of America Medal in 2000
- The 2006 Lasker Award for Basic Medical Research
- The 2008 Dr H.P. Heineken Prize for Biochemistry and Biophysics, Royal Netherlands Academy of Arts and Sciences
- The 2009 Nobel Prize for Physiology or Medicine (shared with Elizabeth Blackburn and Carol W. Greider)
- The 2011 Oparin Medal

An organism's genes are stored within DNA molecules, which are found in chromosomes inside its cells' nuclei. When a cell divides, it is important that its chromosomes are copied in full, and that they are not damaged. At each end of a chromosome lies a "cap" or telomere, as it is known, which protects it. After Elizabeth Blackburn discovered that telomeres have a particular DNA, through experiments conducted on ciliates and yeast, she and Jack Szostak proved in 1982 that the telomeres' DNA prevents chromosomes from being broken down,

according to the statement released by the Alfred Nobel Foundation.

== Personal life ==
Szostak was married to Terri-Lynn McCormick and has two sons.

== See also ==
- Functional information
