= Dame Alice Owen's School =

School in Potters Bar, Hertfordshire, England

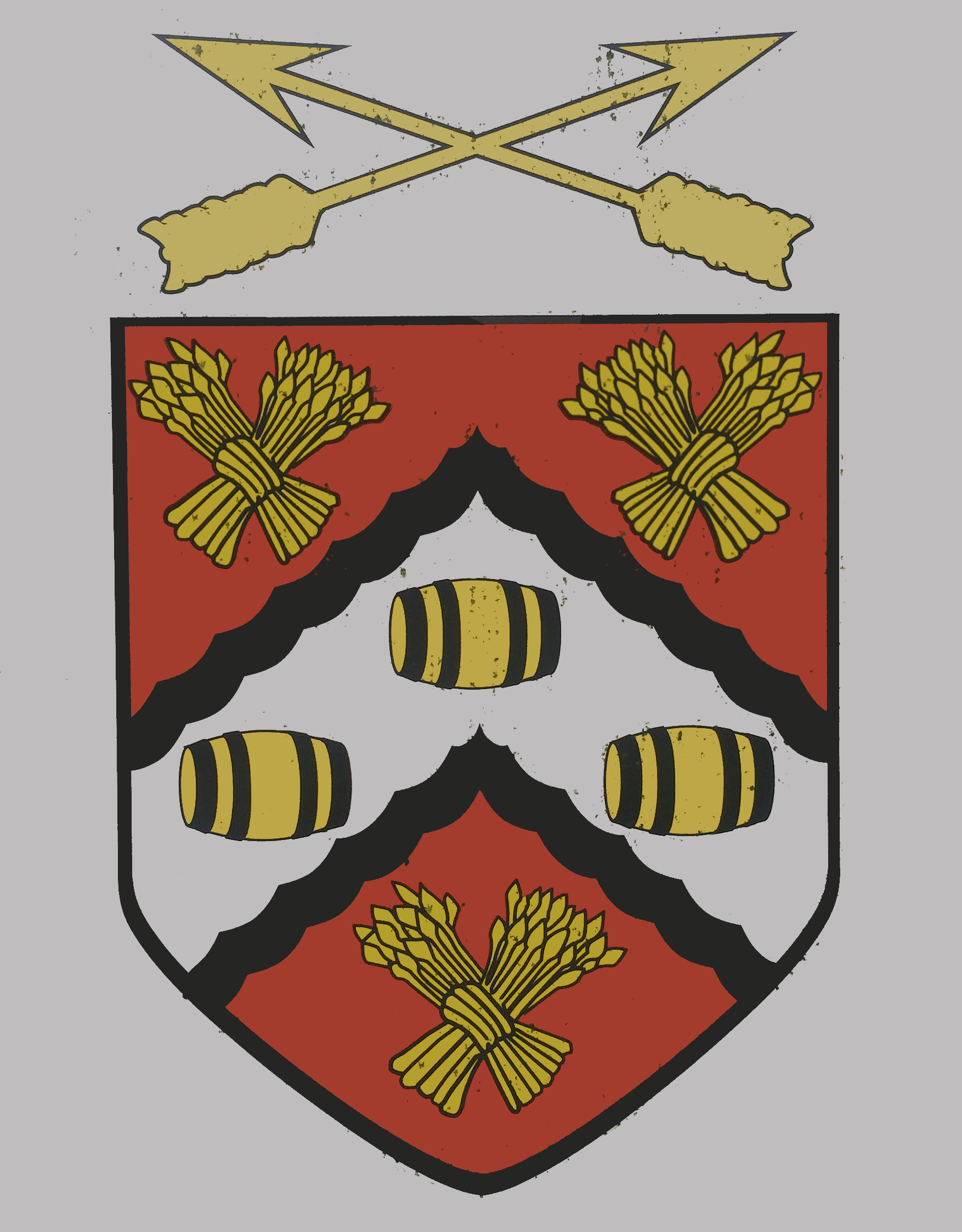

Location
- Dugdale Hill Lane; Potters Bar, Hertfordshire, EN6 2DU; England; 51.6907°N 0.2070°W

Information
- Other names: Dame Alice Owen's; Owen's; DAOS
- Type: Academy
- Motto: In God is All Our Trust; The Owen's Way (Note: This is an acrostic from the word Owen's: O – Opportunity for all; W – Window to the world; E – Excellence in everything; N – Never stop learning; S – Supportive community.; It was created in 2011.)
- Established: 1613; 413 years ago
- Founder: Alice Owen
- Local authority: Hertfordshire County Council
- Trust: Dame Alice Owen's Foundation
- Specialists: Languages, Science, Music
- Department for Education URN: 136554 Tables
- Ofsted: Reports
- Head teacher: Hannah Nemko
- Gender: Mixed
- Age range: 11–18
- Enrolment: 1,454 (2018)
- Capacity: 1,416
- Colours: Red and Black
- Publication: The Arrow
- Alumni: Old Owenians
- Website: www.damealiceowens.herts.sch.uk

Dame Alice Owen's School (DAOS, (Note: Pronounced /ˈdeɪ.ɒs/ DAY-oss.) or simply Dame Alice Owen's or Owen's) is an 11–18 co-educational, partially selective secondary school and sixth form with academy status in Potters Bar, Hertfordshire, England. It is part of the Dame Alice Owen's Foundation; its trustees are the Worshipful Company of Brewers.

It was founded in Islington as a boys' school for 30 students in 1613, which makes it one of the oldest schools in the United Kingdom, and is named after its founder, the 17th-century philanthropist Alice Owen. Over time, the boys' school expanded. A girls' school was built in 1886, and the two schools were merged in 1973; the mixed school moved to its current location at Dugdale Hill Lane in Potters Bar in stages between 1973 and 1976. Until the merger the boys' school was just known as Owen's School.

The school is one of the highest performing state schools in England and Wales in terms of the General Certificate of Secondary Education (GCSE) and GCE Advanced Level (A-Level) results, and is considered one of the best schools in the UK. In 2016, it was named the State Secondary School of the Year by The Sunday Times in the newspaper's rankings for the 2016–17 school year, and also received praise from Tatler and The Daily Telegraph. In 2020, it was named Regional State School of the Decade for the South East of England by The Sunday Times.

== History ==
=== Foundation: pre–1613 ===
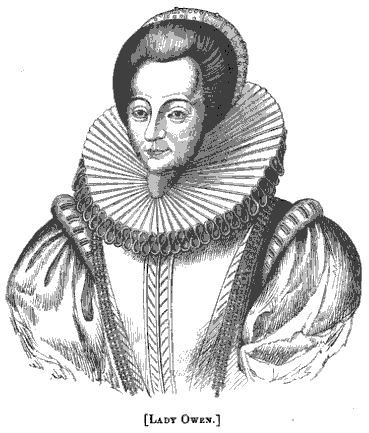
An engraving copied from a copy of a portrait of Alice Owen

Dame Alice Owen's School was founded in 1613 by the English philanthropist Alice Owen (née Wilkes; 1547 – 26 November 1613). (Note: Owen is often referred to as Dame Alice Owen, or Lady Owen, but this is because of her status as the widow of a judge – she was never knighted.) Owen decided to found a school to thank God for saving her when she was a child after she narrowly avoided being struck by an arrow, which passed through her hat, in the fields in Islington; the exact nature of this event is disputed. (Note: Many sources, especially modern ones (including the school's website), say that Owen was milking a cow when this happened; some claim that Owen saw a woman milking a cow and decided to try that herself. However, her entry in the first edition of the Dictionary of National Biography (DNB) says that this happened when she was playing with other children, and that the story has "received many embellishments". Patricia Higgins, writing in A Historical Dictionary of British Women, calls the whole story of the incident a "legend". The event was first mentioned in the second edition of John Stow's Survey of London, which was written in 1618, five years after Owen's death.)

The death of her third husband (the judge Thomas Owen) in 1598 caused Alice Owen to be free to carry out her plans. On 6 June 1608, she acquired a licence to purchase 11 acres (4.5 hectares) of ground in Islington and Clerkenwell, on which to build a hospital for 10 poor widows, and to confer power over that land (and some other land; in total, it was worth £40 a year) to the Worshipful Company of Brewers (her first husband, Henry Robinson, had been a member of the company). The site had been called the "Hermitage" (Note: Also spelt "Ermytage".) field. In 1609, Owen officially gave authority over the charity she had founded to the Brewers' Company; by indentures dated in that year, she had given the company an annual payment of £25 to support her almshouses.

After founding the almshouses in 1608 on the site, which was on the east side of St John Street, in 1610 Owen obtained the right to build a school and chapel in the same location. It was built between 1610 and 1612 and probably opened in 1613. Three iron arrows were fixed into a gable in the building, to commemorate the time when she was almost hit by an arrow; Owen also erected a free chapel there. On 20 September 1613, she made rules for her school (and the almshouses); notably, the school was to take thirty boys – twenty-four from Islington and six from Clerkenwell – and be inspected by the Brewers' Company once a year.

The rules also stated that the school's headmaster was to be paid five pounds every three months and be given a house to live in for free; he was to teach writing, mathematics and bookkeeping. Her will (which was dated 10 June 1613), directed the yearly purchase of land worth £20 in order to pay the headmaster's salary. The first man to hold the position was William Leske, who held the position until 1614 before resigning. Samuel Lewis Jnr writes that according to John Stow's Survey of London, building the school and almshouses, as well as purchasing the land, cost £1776. To provide her charity with an income, the executor of Owen's will, Sir Thomas Rich, bought a 41-acre (17-hectare) farm in Orsett in Essex for £22.

==== Traditions ====
The school has maintained many traditions from the time of its founding, such as the giving of a small amount of "beer money" to every pupil. This is a reminder of the school's long-standing close association with the brewing industry and the Worshipful Company of Brewers. Pupils in Year Seven receive a special five-pound coin in a ceremony at Brewers' Hall in London, while the older years are given money at school by the Master of the Worshipful Company of Brewers on the last day of the academic year.

=== Early years and expansion: 1613–1886 ===
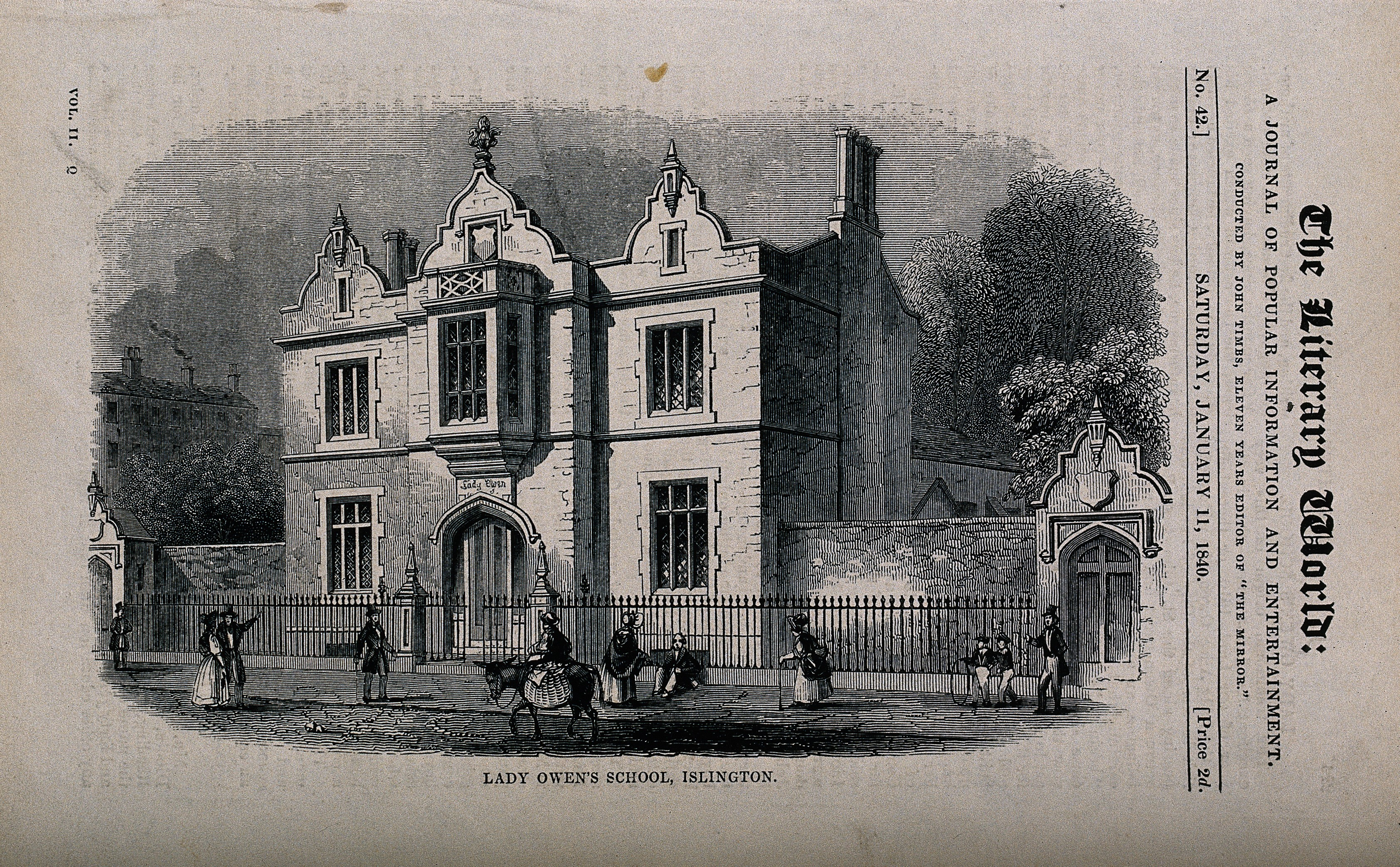
Lady Owen's School, Islington. Wood engraving, 1840.

William Smith, who held the position of headmaster between 1666 and 1678, was dismissed because of alleged involvement in the Popish Plot. In 1731, Thomas Dennett, who had been the headmaster since 1717, ran away.

In 1818, the Charity Commission found that there were 55 boys at the school – the 30 specified by Owen, and 25 private pupils (several of whom boarded with Alexander Balfour, who served as headmaster from 1791 to 1824). Only the private pupils learned French and Latin (the other children had the opportunity to learn Latin, but none took it). At the time, the headmaster earned £30 a year. The value of the trust estates in Islington and Clerkenwell had grown to £900 a year by 1830. The school was rebuilt and a new almshouse was built in 1840 or 1841 (Note: Lupton writes that this took place in 1841 and Lewis says that the new buildings were built in 1840–41;by contrast, Victoria County History's A History of the County of Middlesex states that this happened ten years after a project created in 1830 and the Survey of London says that the new schoolhouse was built in 1840.) on a new site in Owen Street, Islington (near their previous location), at a cost of about £6,000, because the old buildings had fallen into disrepair; the original buildings were demolished.

The school was expanded when new classrooms were built in 1846 and 1860. In 1842, there were 85 boys attending the school – one-fifth (17) of them were from Clerkenwell while four-fifths (68) were from Islington – though the new school was intended to be for 120 boys. That number of pupils had been reached by 1865 when there were 100 boys from Islington and 20 from Clerkenwell at the school (all aged between 7 and 14).

A new project received royal assent on 14 August 1878; this scheme enabled the school to expand into two schools – one for 300 boys, and the other for that many girls. The almshouse was demolished so that a playground could be built (the former inhabitants of the almshouse received pensions). The front of the boys' school was rebuilt on a larger scale at this time. The girls' school was opened in Owen's Row in 1886; its first headmistress was Emily Armstrong.

=== Two independent schools in Islington: 1886–1951 ===
The boys' school was expanded further in 1895–96 so that 420 boys could go there; a new wing was built, which included a library and science laboratories. In 1897, a memorial to Alice Owen (in the form of a statue) was commissioned; this statue is still located in the modern school. A building used for lunch as well as art and woodwork was built in 1904. During Robert Chomeley's time as headmaster (1909–27), the boys' school obtained playing fields in Oakleigh Park and he built several huts there, which were used for lessons. An assembly hall was added to the boys' school during his tenure; it was built in 1927.

The schools were evacuated to Bedford during the Second World War, in which the schools' buildings were badly damaged. The girls' school was mostly destroyed by bombing in 1940 and had to be rebuilt; on 15 October 1940, 143 people were sheltering in the basement when a parachute mine hit the building, causing a pipe to flood the basement and killing 109 of the occupants. (A memorial to the people who died in the bombing was unveiled in 2005 at City and Islington College, at the former site of Dame Alice Owen's School's playground). Temporary huts were initially used when the students returned in 1945; a new five-storey girls' school building was built between 1960 and 1963.

=== Two voluntary aided schools in Islington: 1951–1976 ===
In 1951, Dame Alice Owen's took voluntary aided status, while retaining its separation into two single-sex schools. Both schools were in Goswell Road, facing each other across the boys' playground.

In 1963, there were over six hundred boys in the boys' school, of whom more than a hundred were in the sixth form. That year, the boys' and girls' schools celebrated the 350th anniversary of the foundation; this involved various celebrations, including sporting events and concerts. The first official history of the school, by Reg Dare, was also published that year; there was also a Thanksgiving Service at St Paul's Cathedral on 30 April. A new building, part of the girls' school, was opened in October. Funds were raised to purchase a residential centre for both of the schools to use. Pupils stayed there for periods of several days and learned there; the centre, which was located outside London, was called Harrock House. It opened in May 1965, and closed in 1985 due to the cost of maintaining it.

The two schools merged in 1973 and were run as a mixed school while pupils were transferred in stages to the school's current location in Potters Bar in Hertfordshire between 1973 and July 1976. Reasons for the move included the restrictions of the site in Islington and a decline in the number of pupils in the area. It is also noteworthy that, at that time, the road junction around The Angel Islington was subject to design review, with several potential designs, the smallest of which would have resulted in a roundabout that would have required demolition of the rear of the cloisters (the oldest section at the rear of the boys' school building). As it transpired, none of the plans was ultimately implemented, and The Angel road junction remains substantially unchanged to date (2024) The new school was opened on 8 June 1976 by Princess Anne.

The former boys' school building has now been demolished; the girls' school building is now part of City and Islington College.

=== Mixed school in Potters Bar: 1976–present ===
On 2 November 1990, the Duke of Edinburgh visited the school and opened a new building for physics and information technology that also houses a library, called the Edinburgh Centre. On 25 November 1997, Princess Anne opened a building for the sixth form and modern languages called the Bernard Ryan Centre. Five other buildings have been added to the site since 1976.

In 2011, the school became an academy; it had previously been a voluntary-aided school. In January 2019, the school received a grant of £50 000 from Hertsmere Borough Council to refurbish an astroturf sports pitch. Later that year, a new teaching block known as the "Brewers Education Centre" was completed, after over a year of construction. The building was formally opened in 2021 in a ceremony with the Worshipful Company of Brewers. The building cost approximately £5 million, with funding coming from the UK government and the Brewers' Company. The Bernard Ryan Centre was due to undergo extensive renovation in 2023.

==== 400th anniversary (2013) ====
Reported conversation between the school and the Royal Albert Hall

Hall: We don't do school concerts.
School: Neither do we.

— Reported in Tatler, 2014

To commemorate the school's quatercentenary in 2013, the school established a 400th Anniversary Committee chaired by the musician Gary Kemp (with Peter Martin, the chair of governors, as vice-chairman), which organised several events. Kemp is an Old Owenian (former student) who met most of the future members of his band (with the exception of his brother, Martin) Spandau Ballet at the school. Construction was set to start in February 2013. By November 2013, more than £840 000 had been raised. In 2014, Lord Winston unveiled the new block. Staff and volunteers made a cake at the school, large enough for all the staff, students and parents to share; this marked the beginning of the celebrations. The film director and producer Sir Alan Parker (also an Old Owenian) directed a Celebration Concert at the Royal Albert Hall in April 2013, (it was planned to take place on 23 April 2013) featuring performances by various groups of students, as well as members of Spandau Ballet (including Kemp). A Thanksgiving Service was held at St Paul's Cathedral on 30 April 2013; it was meant to be held a week after the concert. In November, the train company First Capital Connect named a Class 321/4 Electric multiple unit (321409) "Dame Alice Owens 400 years of learning" to honour the occasion.

In conjunction with the celebrations, a 400th-Anniversary Appeal was set up to raise £1 million towards a new science building for the school. It was launched in February 2011 by Lord Robert Winston. Kemp was the chairman of the appeal; he said that the school needs assistance "to support ... the scientists of tomorrow". The total cost of the building was predicted to be £6 million. The new block was unveiled by Lord Winston in 2014 (some of the funding came from the appeal).

== Governance ==
The Dame Alice Owen's Foundation (Note: Also called the "Dame Alice Owen Foundation".) supports the school, and its trustees are the Worshipful Company of Brewers. The school's governing body consists of thirteen Foundation Governors (whose appointments are endorsed by the Worshipful Company of Brewers, since they are trustees of the Dame Alice Owen's Foundation), two elected teacher-governors, the headteacher and three elected parent-governors. The Governing Body meets once in every school term, and will hold additional meetings if necessary. As of September 2018, the Chair of Governors is Peter Martin.

== Admissions ==
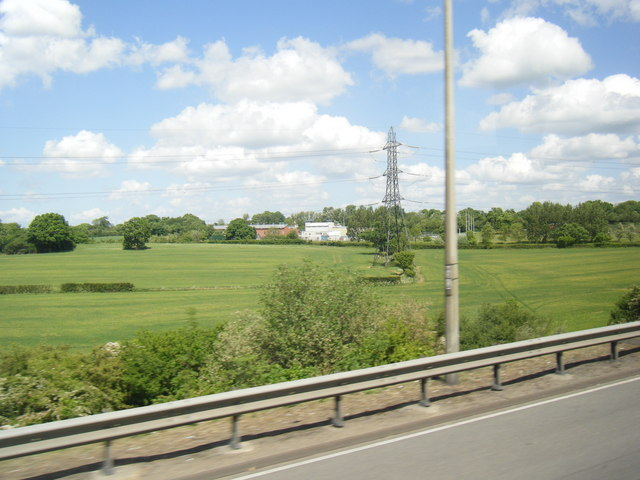
A view of the school from the M25 motorway.

The school is partially selective by means of an entrance examination; roughly a third of pupils are selected based on academic ability, while others are chosen because of musical skills, having a sibling at the school or living in the school's catchment area (which includes Islington, from where 20 pupils are admitted yearly because the school was previously located there). 200 pupils are admitted to Year 7 annually; this is the school's published admission number. Sixty-five children enter through the entrance examinations each year (there are two, which take place on different days – the first tests verbal reasoning and English and the second tests mathematics) and 10 through a musical aptitude test. There are 22 places available for children who live close to the school; this criterion was introduced in 2008 to give priority to those who live locally. There were 38 applications under this criterion in 2018. Tatler have described the admissions procedure as "mind-boggling". The school also allows external applications to its sixth form.

Students are drawn from a wide area, and the school is heavily oversubscribed. In 2013, it received 665 more applications than there were places. As of 2016, fewer than a quarter of applications succeed; ten people apply for every place offered to external candidates to the sixth form. In 2018, the school received 819 applications, of which 359 had the school as their first preference.

In 2006, Alan Davison, the school's headteacher at that time, strongly opposed a plan by the Department for Education and Skills to ban partially selective schools from prioritising applications from the siblings of students attending the school, saying that the proposal threatened the school's "family-friendly atmosphere", and also stated that potentially affected schools were obtaining legal advice (the government never implemented the rule).

The school has reported that many families buy or rent houses near the school that they only live in for a short time in order to obtain a place at the school for their children, then move back to their original homes soon after. The school believed that this practice disadvantages families that have lived in the area for a long time. According to the school, half of the pupils who had received places due to proximity to the school in 2008 had moved back to previous homes which were further from the school by 2010. The school introduced several rules to combat this problem; one requirement is that families who retain a previous home within 50 miles (80 km) of the school must live in the new home for 36 months before applying to the school, else the new address will only be treated as a temporary address. This was increased from 24 months for the 2018 and 2019 admissions. In 2018, a parent objected to this change on the grounds that it disadvantaged families who did not want to sell their former homes, arguing that the concerns about families moving away from the area after obtaining a place were not applicable to him and that school made the change without thinking of people in his situation. The Office of the Schools Adjudicator, which works with the Department for Education, did not uphold the objection; it ruled that the arrangements did not affect a particular racial or social group and that they were fair. In 2013, Davison criticised Hertfordshire County Council and the British government for their alleged lack of response to fraudulent applications for the places at the school available based on residence (it was claimed that in order to qualify, people were renting or buying houses near the school without living in them). He said "[p]eople will do anything to [obtain a place at the school]".

== Academic performance ==
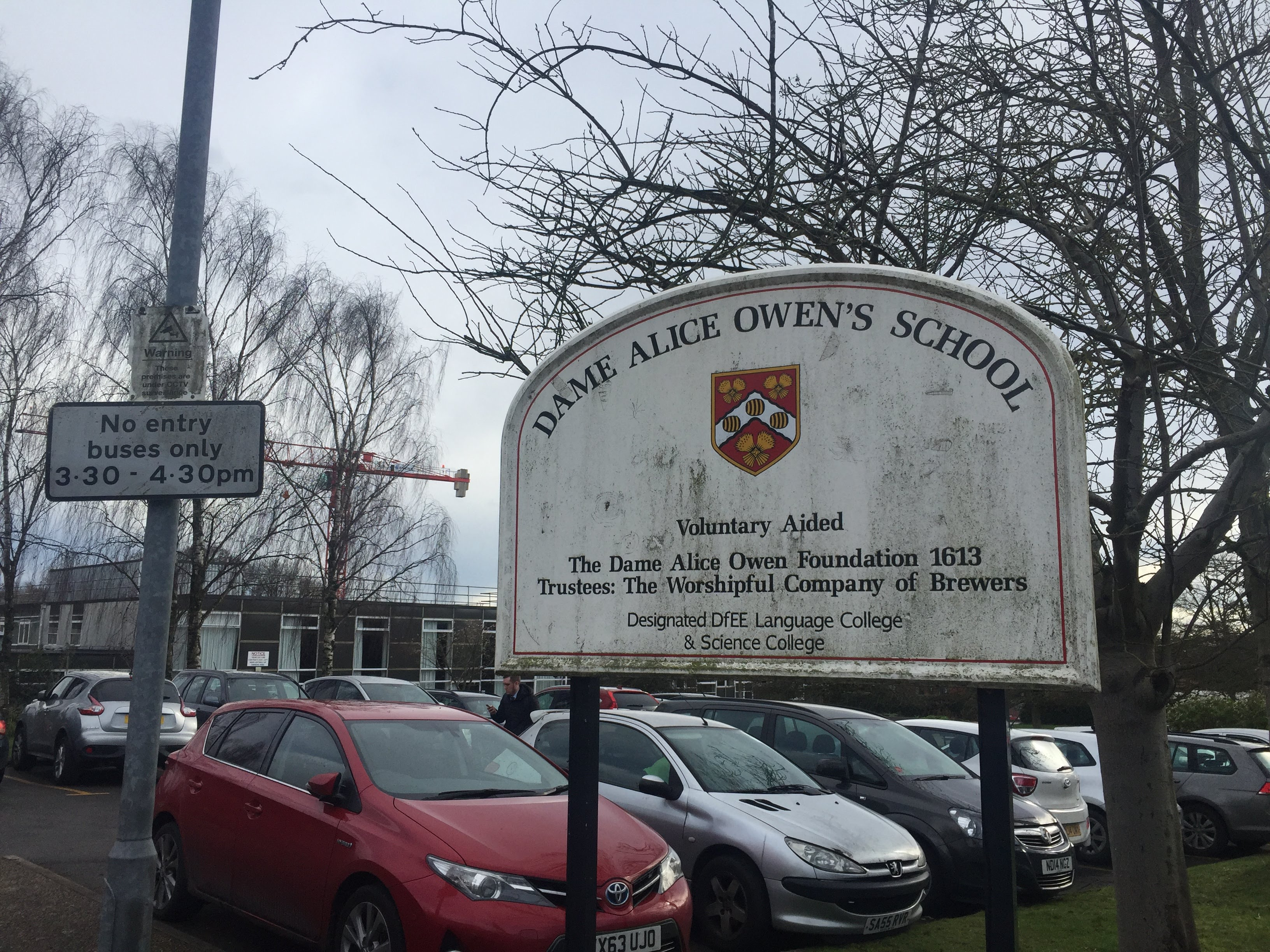
A sign at the front of the school

In terms of exam results, the school is one of the highest-ranked state schools in the country. In 2022, 40% of all Year 11 GCSE entries were graded 9 (old A*), and 93% of all Year 11 students secured 5 or more grades 9-4 (the grade range for a pass.) At A-Level, 44% of all entries were graded A*, 92% were graded A*-B and all entries secured a pass grade.

== Extracurricular activities ==
Many pupils take part in the Duke of Edinburgh Award, including around 30 annually who do the Gold Award, the highest level. School trips accompany students' learning, with many trips international, for example Religious Studies trips to the Galapagos Islands and Costa Rica, as well as Geography and History trips to Iceland and Ypres. There are also opportunities for students to visit the school's partner school in Tanzania.

The PE department, once a powerhouse for school sport in Hertfordshire and the local area, school sports are now limited to only a few Saturdays and a large number of fixtures are cancelled or postponed. The school also has bands, orchestras and choirs, and pupils can learn musical instruments. Concerts take place at the end of every academic term including the school's many ensembles. The school has several students enrolled in the National Youth Orchestra. The school puts on drama productions each year. The school's clubs and societies include chess and debating. The school has a student-produced magazine, called The Arrow, which was first published in 1899 and is now published once a year.

== Location and school grounds ==
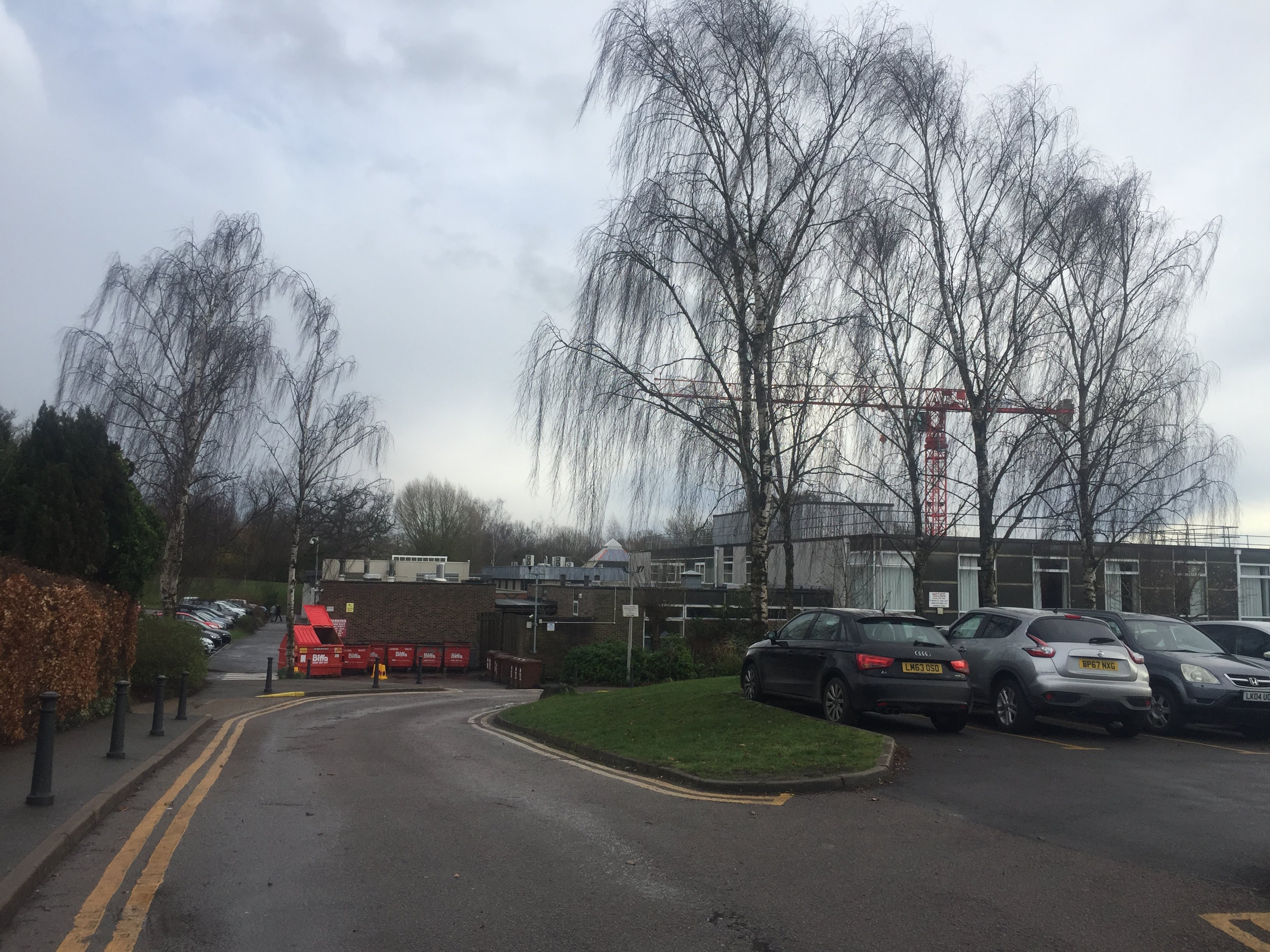
A view of the school from the street

Dame Alice Owen's School is situated in the south of Potters Bar, just north of the M25 motorway and near South Mimms services (which are to the west of the school). Its grounds have an area of 34 acres (14 hectares) and include a lake and large playing fields. In 2014, Alice Rose, writing for Tatler magazine, praised its "excellent facilities" and "smart campus"; in 2016, the journalist Sue Leonard, writing in The Times, said that the school "offers...facilities many other secondary schools can only envy", and described its sports grounds as "enormous".

Students at the school come from a wide area, and the school is served by five bus routes. Three of these are London bus routes contracted by Transport for London (TfL): the 313, 626, and 699 (Arriva London operates the 313 route, Metroline operates the 626 route, and the and 699 route are operated by Uno.) Two other bus routes operated on behalf of Hertfordshire County Council, the 242 (operated by Uno (bus company)), and the 243 (operated by Uno), also serve the school. More than 200 students also travel to school by train daily via Potters Bar railway station.

== Controversies ==
=== Allegations of racism ===
A 2002 Ofsted report remarked that "the governors and senior management team have not included ‘racial equality as an integral part of all formal and informal training’". It further noted that "in a Sixth Form English literature lesson examining unseen poems, all those studied were written by white poets" and that "The National Curriculum refers to ‘using materials which reflect cultural diversity and provide positive images of race, sex and disability’. The school has very few such materials, for example posters and information about the achievements of black scientists, which are easily available".

In 2021, 800 students participated in a mass walkout to protest what they viewed as a failure by the school to take action against racial abuse and bullying. In a statement, the school stated that "we have not always lived up to this aim [to 'be an inclusive environment where everyone can feel supported']".

== Notable alumni ==
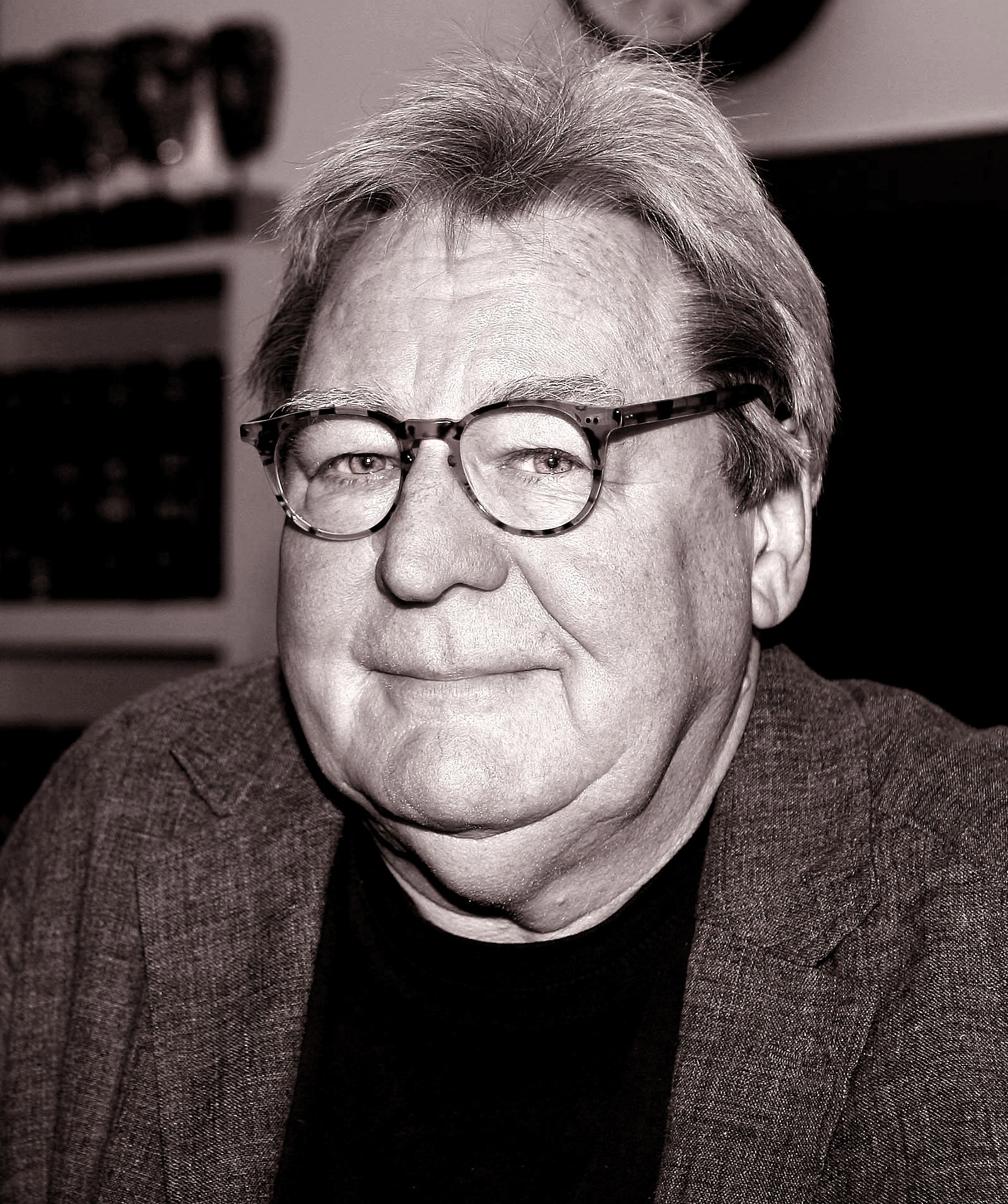
Film director Sir Alan Parker, a former pupil of the school

The school has had many notable former pupils, who are referred to as Old Owenians. Those for careers in the entertainment industry include Fiona Wade, an actress in the soap opera Emmerdale; Dame Beryl Grey, a ballerina; Jessica Tandy, an Academy Award-winning actress; Both Tony Hadley, lead singer and Gary Kemp, the lead guitarist and songwriter for the band Spandau Ballet, Sir Alan Parker, a film director, and Ambika Mod, an actress, comedian and writer, known for her role in the Netflix miniseries One Day.

Sportsperson alumni include the gymnast Gabrielle Jupp; Jodie Williams, a sprinter; Paul Robinson, a professional footballer, and Dame Mary Glen-Haig, a gold-medal-winning fencer at the Commonwealth Games. Old Owenians notable for their achievements in science are Frederick Gugenheim Gregory, a botanist who won the Royal Medal; Leslie Reginald Cox, a palaeontologist, and the chemist Leslie Orgel, who is known for inventing Orgel's rules. The Marxist journalist and historian Andrew Rothstein also went to the school.

Two former Labour MPs have attended the school: Ronald Chamberlain, MP for Norwood, and Millie Miller, leader of Camden Council and MP for Ilford North. The politician Alan Amos, who was the Conservative MP for Hexham, taught at the school between 1976 and 1984.

== List of headteachers ==
The modern and former boys' and girls' schools have had many headteachers:

=== Mixed school in Potters Bar ===
- Hannah Nemko, 2016–present
- Alan Davison, 2005–2016
- Aldon T. Williamson, 1994–2005
- David Bolton, 1982–1994
- Gerald F. Jones, 1973–1982 (previously head of the boys' grammar school in Islington)

=== Mixed school in Islington ===
- Ronald C. Puddephatt, 1973–1976

=== Girls' grammar school ===
- Celia Nest Kisch, 1960–1973
- Eslie P. Ward, 1945–1960
- Agnes Mary Bozman, 1933–1945
- Eleanor Wilson, 1914–1933
- Emily Armstrong, 1886–1914

=== Second boys' grammar school ===
- Gerald F. Jones, 1962–1973 (he became the headteacher of the modern, mixed school; see above)
- Edward H. Burrough, 1955–1962
- Walter Garstang, 1948–1954
- Oliver W. Mitchell, 1939–1948
- Rev Harry Asman, 1929–1939
- Edwin T. England, 1927–1929
- Robert F. Cholmeley CBE, 1909–1927
- James Easterbrook, 1881–1909
- Thomas H. Way, 1879–1881
- John Hoare, 1840–1879 (previously head of the first boys' grammar school)

=== Masters of the first boys' grammar school ===
- John Hoare, 1833–1840 (he became the headmaster of the second boys' school; see above)
- Joseph Summersby, 1825–1833
- Alexander Balfour, 1791–1824
- David Davies, 1750–1791
- Richard Shilton, 1738–1750
- Henry Clarke, 1731–1738
- Thomas Dennett, 1717–1731
- Laurence Brandreth, 1716–1717
- George Thomson, 1711–1716
- Roger Rogerson, 1699–1711
- William Vickars, 1692–1699
- John Clutterbuck, 1678–1692
- William Smith, 1666–1678
- Mr Fowle, 1665–1666
- John Clarke, 1665
- George Lovejoy, 1654–1665
- Peter Dowell, 1628–1654
- Nathaniel Bate, 1626–1628
- John Jorden, 1624–1626
- John Weston, 1624
- Mr Lymer, 1620–1624
- Mr Jones, 1617–1620
- John Hewes, 1614–1617
- William Leske, 1613–1614
