= Thomas Owen (died 1598) =

Member of the Parliament of England

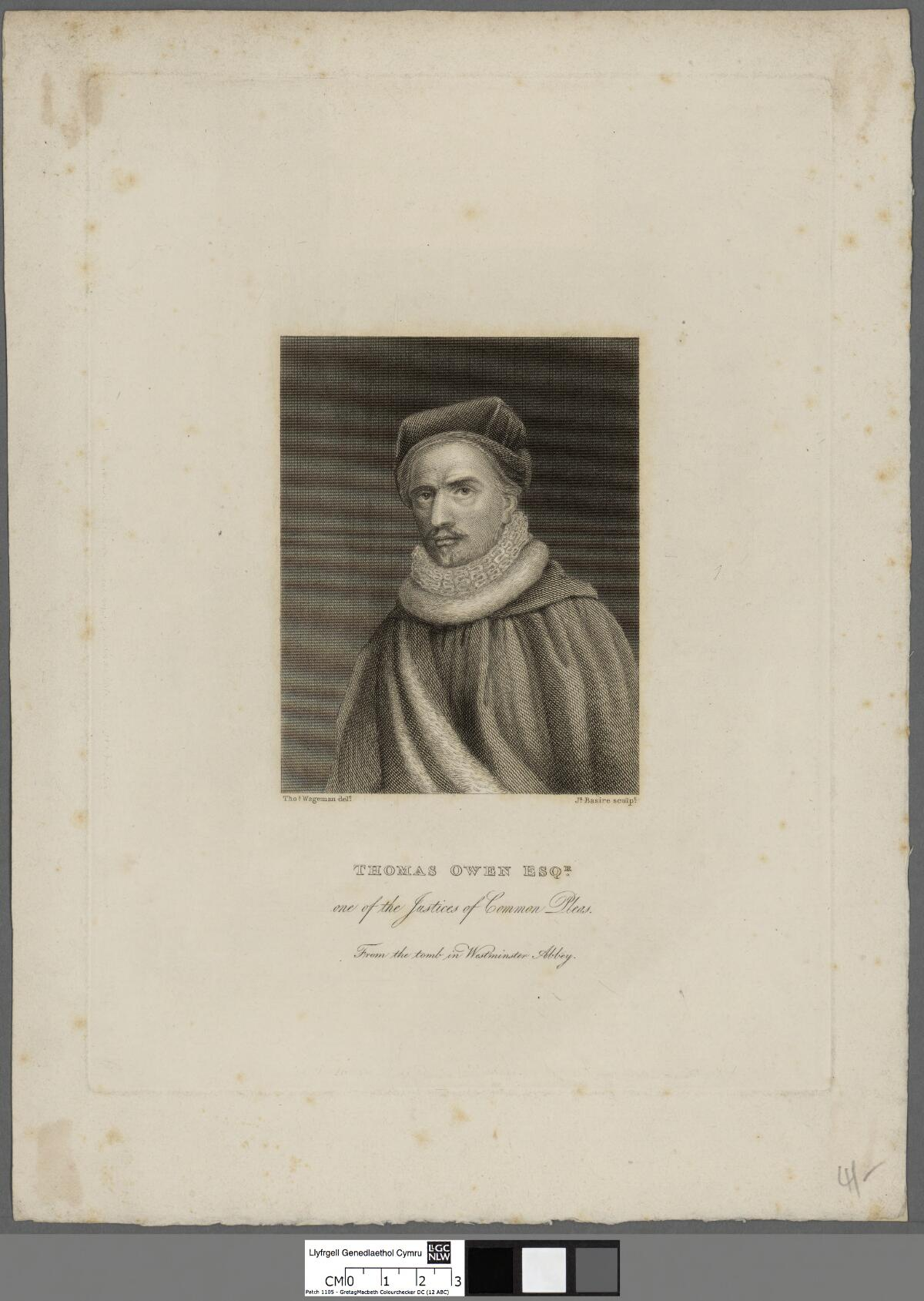
- Portrait of Thomas Owen

Member of Parliament
- Monarch: Elizabeth I

Personal details
- Born: Unknown
- Died: 21 December 1598
- Occupation: Judge, politician

Thomas Owen (died 21 December 1598) was an English judge and politician during the reign of Elizabeth I of England. He served as a Member of Parliament and held notable judicial positions of his time. His contributions were significant during Elizabethan England, particularly in law and parliamentary matters.

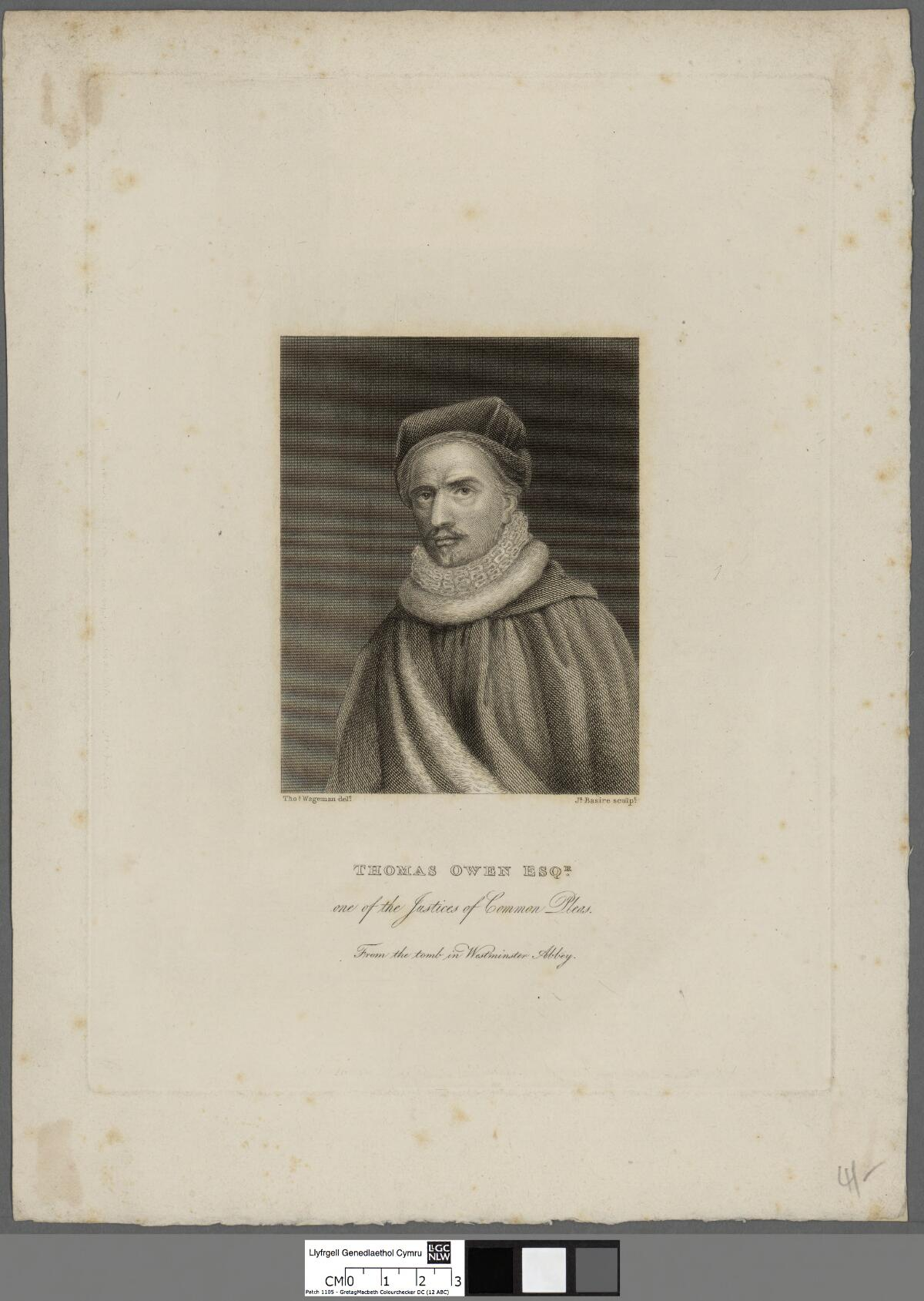
Portrait of Thomas Owen Esqr (4671730)

== Early life ==
Owen was first son of Richard Owen, merchant of Shrewsbury by Mary, daughter of Thomas Otley of Salop. He was educated at Oxford University, (variously stated to have been at Christ Church or Broadgates Hall), gaining a B.A. in 1559. He entered Lincoln's Inn to study law in 1562.

== Legal and political career ==
Called to the Bar in 1570, Owen served at his Inn of Court as Bencher in 1579, marshal 1582–83, keeper of the Black Book 1586–87, and treasurer 1588–89.

From about 1583 he was a J.P. for Shropshire and other counties. He was a Member (MP) of the Parliament of England for Shrewsbury in 1584, and later Recorder of the borough in 1588–1592; promoted serjeant-at-law in 1589, and Queen's serjeant in 1593; member of the Council in the Marches of Wales 1590; ultimately justice of the common pleas in 1595.

== Estates ==
Although Owen bought the manor of Condover, near Shrewsbury, in 1586, and built a fine red sandstone house there which was completed in 1598, he does not seem to have lived in it himself. Contrary to legend, it had not been granted him by Queen Elizabeth, but was purchased from the previously owning family, the Vynars, having previously leased it from 1578. He also bought or leased estates in Montgomeryshire and Essex.

== Personal life ==
Owen was twice married: first, to Sarah, daughter of Humphrey Baskerville, having by her five sons and five daughters; and second, to Alice, daughter of Thomas Wilkes of London, and widow of William Elkin, alderman of London, and of Henry Robinson, brewer of London. The latter survived him, and lived to found Dame Alice Owen's School in Islington in 1613, the year she died.

== Death ==
Owen died on 21 December 1598 and was buried in Westminster Abbey. In his will he left the bailiffs of Shrewsbury money for the relief of 'decayed householders' and 'poor impotent persons' in the parish of Saint Chad, where he was born. There were also bequests to the poor of Condover parish and Westminster, and the deans of St. Paul's and Westminster each received a small legacy. There is a tomb effigy in Westminster Abbey and he is also portrayed, kneeling facing his son Sir Roger Owen, on a monument erected in Condover church by his daughter Jane Norton (who appears facing her husband) in 1641.

His son, Sir Roger Owen, succeeded to Thomas Owen's Condover and other estates.

== In Legend ==
The folklorist Charlotte Burne recorded a local legend, told by a person in the parish of Condover in 1881 – noting it to be "utterly at variance with facts", which she meticulously explained- wherein Owen, here the "clever" "son of the ostler of the Lion inn", had risen through education into the legal profession. In studying past trials, he came to suspect that John Viam, a servant at Condover Hall, had been falsely accused of murdering the lord of the manor, Knevett, in the reign of Henry VIII. Per the story, Knevett's son was the real murderer. Owen, "a special favourite with Queen Elizabeth", was given permission for a new trial, and in successfully condemning the murderous younger lord to death, Owen was rewarded with the Condover estate.

As Burne observes, however, Owen was the son of a wool merchant of old Welsh stock, and foremost amongst the discrepancies involved in the story is that Condover Hall was built for Owen's son Roger, fifty years after the death of Henry VIII. The only Knevett (or Knyvett) associated with Condover was a Sir Henry, who sold the manor soon after it was granted to him by Henry VIII.
