= Functional information =

Information content of biological systems

The concept of functional information is an attempt to rigorously define the information content of biological systems. The concept was originated by a group led by Jack W. Szostak in 2003.

== Definition ==
They define functional information as follows:

- the concept of degree of function is introduced, where the degree of function $E_x$ is a non-negative objective measure of the capability of system $E$ to do the physical function $x$.
- the fraction of possible configurations of the system that can achieve at least a particular level of function $\theta$ in regard to the physical function $x$ is defined to be $F(E_x \geq \theta)$
- the functional information relative to a given level of function $E_x = \theta$ is defined as $I(E_x \geq \theta) = -log_2 F(E_x \geq \theta)$

This leads to two conclusions:

- because all possible configurations can achieve zero or more functionality, that is to say $F(E_x \geq 0) = 1$, the minimum possible functional information for a system is $-log_2 1$, which is zero.
- for the highest possible level of a degree of function of a system $E_x = \theta_{max}$, there will be a well defined $I(E_x = \theta_{max}) = -log_2 F(E_x = \theta_{max})$

Note that functional information of a system $E$ must always be defined relative to a specific function $x$, without a choice of which it has no meaning.

== Proposed law of increasing functional information ==
In 2023, a group of researchers proposed a law of increasing functional information, that asserts that a tendency to increase in functional information is an inherent property of the universe, encompassing both biological and non-biological systems.

The researchers postulated that evolving systems appear to be conceptually equivalent by displaying three notable attributes:

1. They form from numerous components that have the potential to adopt combinatorially vast numbers of different configurations;
2. Processes exist that generate numerous different configurations;
3. Configurations are preferentially selected based on function.

Subsequently, the authors proposed that the functional information of a system will increase (i.e., the system will evolve) if many different configurations of the system undergo selection for one or more functions. Authors of the paper see the potential for these ideas to apply to astrobiology, economics, neuroscience, and more.

== See also ==
- Shannon entropy

== See also ==
- Entropy and life
- Second law of thermodynamics
- Specified complexity, a creationist pseudoscientific concept
