= Anne Bedingfeild =

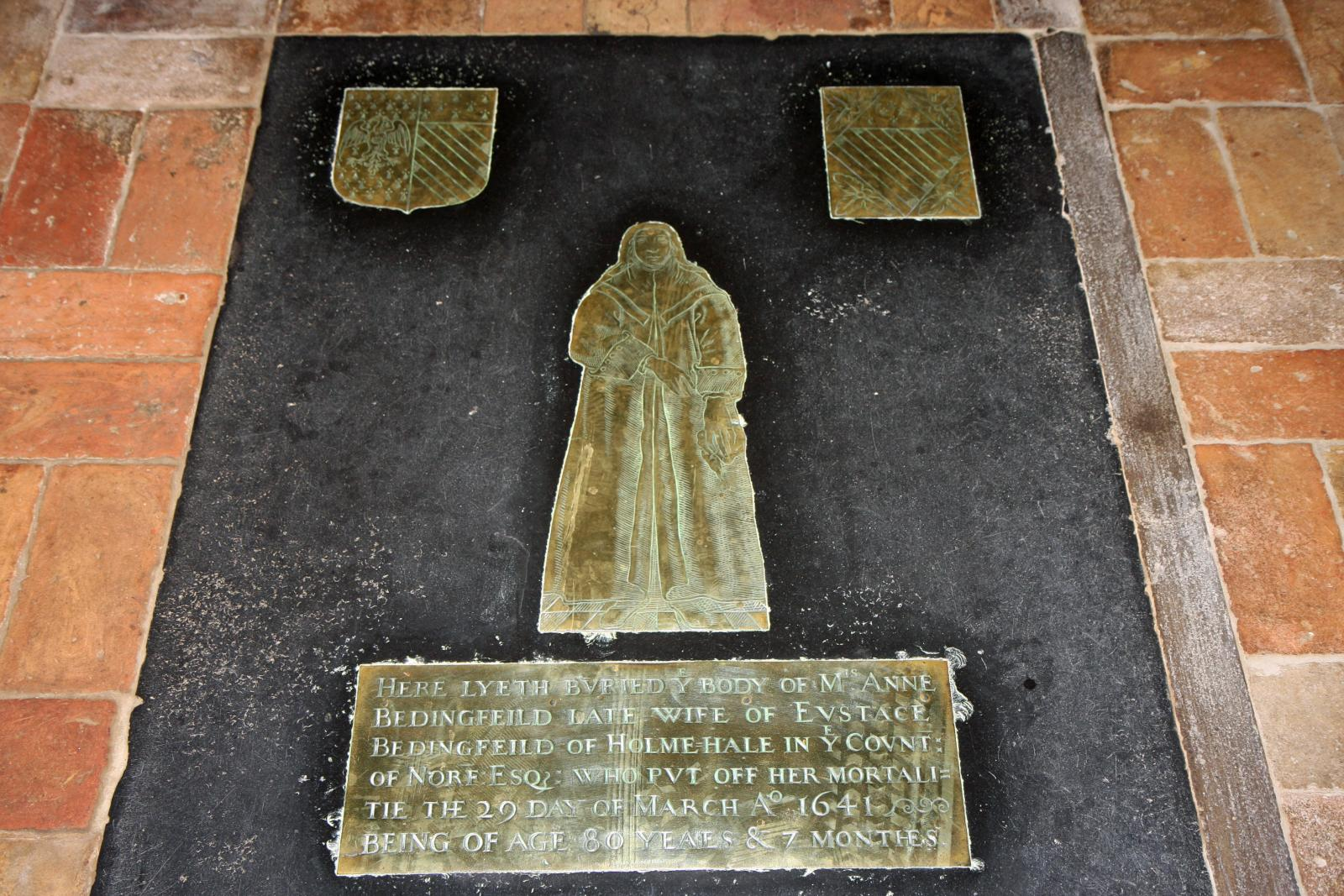
- Memorial brass to Bedingfeild in Darsham church
- Born: Anne Draper; 1560; Probably Middlesex
- Died: 1641 (aged 80–81); Probably Darsham
- Occupation: Landowner
- Known for: Involvement with early theatre
- Spouse: Eustace Bedingfeld (m. 1579; died 1599)
- Children: Anne
- Relatives: Alice Owen (aunt)

Anne Bedingfeild (née Draper; 1560 – 1641) was an English theatre landlord and a benefactor.

== Life ==
Anne was born in 1560 to John Draper and his wife Mary. When her father died he left his brewery business to Mary and her children. He left some land specifically to Anne on what was known as the Seckford estate. The land was still held in trust after the death of Thomas Seckford to fund almshouses that Seckford had also left in his will. Anne had these lands from (probably) the age of sixteen.

In 1579, she married into the recusant family of Eustace Bedingfeld. Bedingfeld lived at Holme Hall. He died in 1599 and Anne took over the management of their affairs. In 1605, her lease of the Seckford land was sub-let to a tailor cum innkeeper named Aaron Holland and to an actor named Martin Slater. The Red Bull Theatre was built by Holland around an existing inn and a company of players called the "Queen's Servants" were resident. Notably, one of the plays by their main playwright Thomas Heywood made fun of Sir Henry Bedingfeld who had been the "jailer" of Queen Elizabeth when she was just a princess. This was unusual as Sir Henry Bedingfeld was her dead husband's uncle.

When she died in 1641, there was a memorial brass placed in All Saints church in Durston which includes a picture of her in a watchman's greatcoat. The plaque notes that she was 80 years and seven months old. Her will included instructions to her daughter to continue to look after seven poor men in Clerkenwell.
