= Roger Owen (MP) =

English Member of Parliament

Sir Roger Owen
- Con Dover Hall, built for Sir Roger Owen

Member of Parliament

Personal details
- Born: 1573 Condover, Shropshire, England
- Died: 29 May 1617 (aged 43–44)
- Education: Christ Church, Oxford
- Occupation: Lawyer, politician

Condover Hall, Shropshire

Sir Roger Owen (1573 – 29 May 1617) was an English lawyer and member of parliament during the late Elizabethan and early Jacobean periods.

He was the eldest son of Thomas Owen of Condover, Shropshire. Owen was educated at Shrewsbury School in 1583 and matriculated at Christ Church, Oxford, receiving a Bachelor of Arts degree in 1592. He trained in law at Lincoln's Inn beginning in 1589 and was called to the bar in 1597.

In 1598, following the death of his father, he inherited the family estate, Condover Hall, which had been constructed for him by Thomas Owen. He was subsequently knighted in 1604.

== Career ==
Owen served as a Member of Parliament representing Shropshire and held influence in regional legal and political matters. His career combined legal practice with parliamentary service, reflecting the typical path of English gentry in the Elizabethan and Jacobean era.

== Legacy ==
Owen's family continued to hold prominence in Shropshire for several generations. Condover Hall, constructed for him by his father, remains a notable example of Elizabethan architecture and reflects the wealth and social standing of the Owen family during the late 16th and early 17th centuries. The estate has historical significance in the region and has been preserved as part of England's architectural heritage.

== Offices held ==
He was appointed a justice of the peace for Shropshire by 1601 to 1614, High Sheriff of Shropshire for 1603–1604 and a member of the Council in the Marches of Wales for 1602–1607. He was knighted in 1604.

He was a bencher at Lincoln's Inn in 1611 and treasurer in 1612–1613. He was elected a member (MP) of the parliament of England for Shrewsbury in 1597 and for Shropshire in 1601, 1606 and 1614.

== Death ==
Sir Roger Owen died intestate in London on 29 May 1617. He was subsequently buried at Condover, the family estate in Shropshire. His death marked the end of his personal involvement in legal and parliamentary affairs, but his family continued to maintain prominence in the region.

== Family ==
He had married his step-sister Ursula, the daughter of William Elkin, alderman of London, and of his wife Alice (daughter of Thomas Wilkes, brewer of London, and also widow of another brewer, Henry Robinson. They had 2 daughters.
