= Phosphorimidazolide =

General chemical structure of a phosphorimidazolide reagent

A phosphorimidazolide is a chemical compound in which a phosphoryl mono-ester is covalently bound to a nitrogen atom in an imidazole ring. They are a type of phosphoramidate. These phosphorus (V) compounds are encountered as reagents used for making new phosphoanhydride bonds with phosphate mono-esters, and as reactive intermediates in phosphoryl transfer reactions in some enzyme-catalyzed transformations. They are also being studied as critical chemical intermediates for the polymerization of nucleotides in pre-biotic settings. They are sometimes referred to as phosphorimidazolidates, imidazole-activated phosphoryl groups, and P-imidazolides.

== Role in oligonucleotide formation ==
Phosphorimidazolides have been investigated for their mechanistic role in abiogenesis (the natural process by which life arose from non-living matter). Specifically, they have been proposed as the active electrophilic species which may have mediated the formation of inter-nucleotide phosphodiester bonds, thereby enabling template-directed oligonucleotide replication before the advent of enzymes. Phosphorimidazolides were originally proposed as mediators of this process by Leslie Orgel in 1968. Early studies showed that divalent metal cations such as Mg^{2+}, Zn^{2+}, and Pb^{2+} and a complementary template were required for the formation of short oligonucleotides, although nucleotides exhibited 5'-2' connectivity instead of 5'-3' connectivity of present-day life forms. It was also shown that Montmorillonite clay could provide a surface for phosphorimidazolide-mediated oligonucleotide formation with lengths of 20-50 bases.

The research group of Jack W. Szostak has continued to investigate the role of phosphorimidazolides in pre-biotic nucleotide polymerization. The group has investigated a number of imidazole derivatives in the search for chemical moieties which provide longer oligonucleotides necessary for propagating genetic information. Significantly, they discovered that phosphorimidazolides promote template-directed oligonucleotide formation via imidazolium-bridged dinucleotide intermediates.

John D. Sutherland and colleagues have proposed that phosphorimidazolides may have formed in the chemical environment of early Earth via the activation of ribonucleotide phosphates by methyl isocyanaide and acetaldehyde followed by substitution with imidazole.

== Phosphoanhydride bond formation ==
While early studies of phosphorimidazolide derivatives of nucleotides found that oligonucleotides could form in the presence of a complementary template, pyrophosphate-linked dimers formed predominantly in the absence of a template. This proclivity for forming new phosphoanhydride bonds has been used in the synthesis of several pyrophosphate-containing organic compounds. A variety of modified nucleotide triphosphates were synthesized using a cyanoethyl-protected phosphorimidazolide reagent. Phosphoanhydride bond forming reactions were found to proceed most rapidly in amide-based organic solvents such as N,N-dimethylformamide and particularly in N,N-dimethylacetamide with Mg^{2+} or Zn^{2+} catalysts.

== Synthesis ==
Phosphorimidazolide reagents have been synthesized from phosphate mono-esters.

In one method, a phosphate mono-ester is dissolved in anhydrous pyridine or N,N-dimethylformamide (DMF) and activated using triphenylphosphine (PPh_{3}) and 2,2’-Dithiodipyridine (2,2’-DTDP) in the presence of triethylamine (TEA) base and excess imidazole. In another method using fewer reagents, a phosphate mono-ester is dissolved in DMF and carbonyldiimidazole (CDI) is used to both remove an oxygen atom from the phosphate group and supply the imidazole substituent. The product of either reaction may be collected by precipitation using acetonitrile or acetone as antisolvent with sodium or lithium perchlorate to supply the sodium or lithium salt of the phosphorimidazolide respectively. Alternatively, the phosphorimidazolide may be isolated by reverse-phase flash column chromatography with TEAB buffer and acetonitrile.
