= Peter Jupp =

British historian (1940–2006)

Peter Jupp (20 August 1940 – 14 September 2006) was a British historian who specialised in British politics during the eighteenth and early nineteenth centuries. His work was characterised by its basis in archival research. He was for a time the chairman of the Northern Ireland branch of The Historical Association.

== Education and career ==
Jupp attended Dame Alice Owen's School in Islington then went on to study at the University of Reading where he also completed his Ph.D. under the supervision of Prof. Arthur Aspinall.

From this point on he was based at Queen's University Belfast, where he took up the position of lecturer in modern history in 1964, which he occupied until he was awarded a personal chair as Professor of British History in 1993, and upon his retirement from this position in 2005 he was made an emeritus professor.

He died in 2006 after a brief illness. After his death a collection of essays, titled Politics and Political Culture in Britain and Ireland, 1750-1850: Essays in Tribute to Peter Jupp, which had been originally conceived as a festschrift to mark his retirement, was published as a tribute to his life and work.

== Books ==
- British and Irish Elections, 1784-1831 (1973)
- Lord Grenville, 1759-1834 (1985)
- The Letter-Journal of George Canning: 1793-1795 - Editor (1991)
- British Politics on the Eve of Reform: the Duke of Wellington's administration, 1828-1830 (1998)
- The Governing of Britain, 1688-1848 (2006)
