= Alice Owen =

English philanthropist

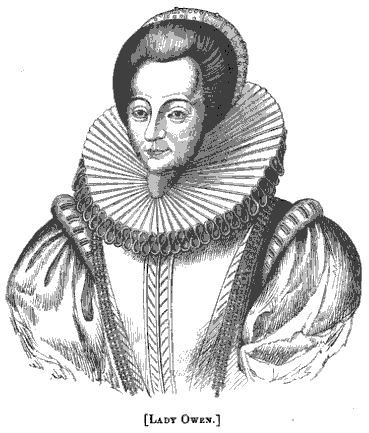
- engraving (see text)
- Born: Alice Wilkes; 1547
- Died: 26 October 1613 (aged 65–66)
- Occupation: Philanthropist
- Spouses: Henry Robinson; William Elkin; Thomas Owen (died 1598)
- Children: 12
- Relatives: Anne Bedingfeild (niece)

Alice Owen (née Wilkes; 1547 – 26 October 1613) was an English philanthropist.

== Life ==
Owen was born in 1547 to an Islington landowner Thomas Wilkes and his wife. She had a sister Mary whose daughter, Anne Bedingfeild, was also a benefactor.

In her childhood, when in the fields at Islington, 'sporting with other children', she had a narrow escape of being killed by an arrow, shot by some unlucky archer, which 'pierced quite thorough the hat on her head'. For this providential escape, she recorded her gratitude in later life by the erection of a school and almshouses on the spot. The story appeared in this form within five years of her death, in the second edition of John Stow's 'Surray', published in 1618. Later on it received many embellishments.

Alice Wilkes was three times married: firstly to Henry Robinson, a member of the Brewers' Company, by whom she had six sons and five daughters; secondly to William Elkin, an alderman of London, by whom she had one daughter, Ursula, married to Sir Roger Owen (son of Thomas, and her stepson) of Condover, Shropshire; and thirdly to the judge Thomas Owen. It is as the widow of Mr. Justice Owen that she is often styled Dame Alice Owen, or even Lady Owen; but Owen was never knighted.

Alice Owen died 26 October 1613, and was buried in the parish church of St Mary's Church, Islington, where a monument preserved her effigy and those of her children till 1751, when, on the pulling down of the old fabric, part of the monument was removed to the school, and a fresh one erected to her memory in the new church.

== Philanthropy ==
By the death of her third husband, 21 December 1598, Mistress Owen was left free to carry out her long-cherished plans.

On 6 June 1608, she obtained licence to purchase at Islington and Clerkenwell eleven acres of ground, whereon to erect a hospital for ten poor widows, and to vest the same and other lands, to the value of £40 a year, in the Brewers' Company.

The site had previously been known as the 'Ermytage' field. Here she erected a school, free chapel, and almshouses, on the east side of St. John Street Road, which stood till 1841.

In one of the gables three iron arrows were fixed, as a memorial of the childhood event previously described.

By indentures dated in 1609, she gave to the Brewers' Company a yearly rent-charge of £25, in support of her almshouses.

On 20 September 1613, she made rules and orders for her new school. She had previously, by her will, dated 10 June 1613, directed the purchase of land to the amount of £20 a year for the maintenance of its master.

She made many other bequests, especially to Christ's Hospital and the two universities of Oxford and Cambridge.

By 1830, the value of the trust estates in Islington and Clerkenwell had grown to £900 a year. In 1841, the school and almshouses were rebuilt, at a cost of about £6,000, on a new site in Owen Street, Islington, a little distance from the old.

On 14 August 1878, a new scheme was approved by the Charity Commissioners, by which the school of Alice Owen was expanded into two – one for about three hundred boys, and the other for the like number of girls.
