= Worshipful Company of Brewers =

Livery company of the City of London

Coordinates: 51°31′02″N 00°05′33″W

Brewers' Company
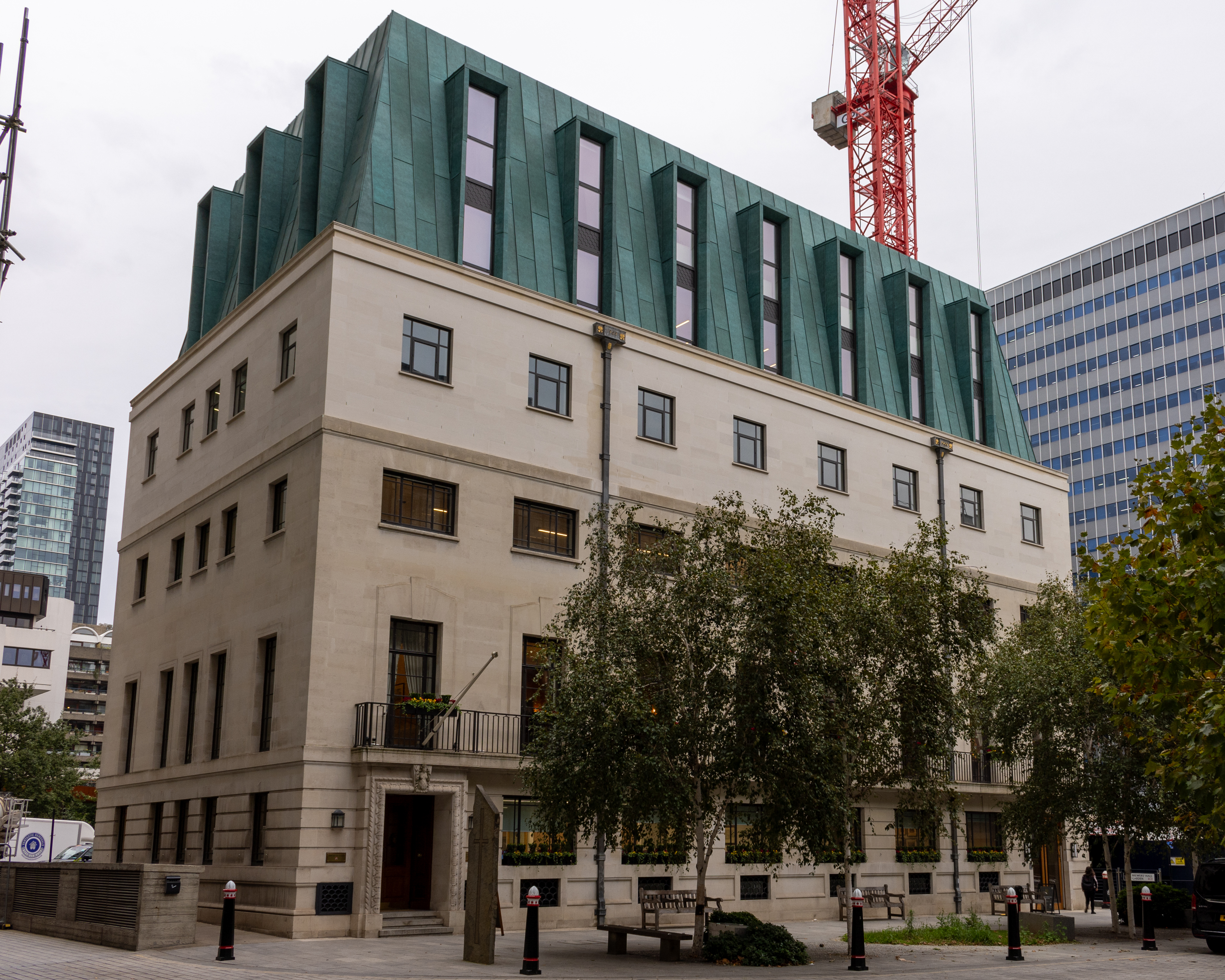
- The present Brewers' Hall in London
- Motto: In God Is All Our Trust
- Location: Brewers' Hall, Aldermanbury Square, London EC2
- Date of formation: 1438; 587 years ago
- Company association: Brewing
- Order of precedence: 14th
- Master of company: James Staughton OBE DL
- Website: www.brewershall.co.uk

The Worshipful Company of Brewers is one of the ancient livery companies of the City of London.

== History ==
Coat of arms of the Worshipful Company of Brewers

At the end of the 12th Century there was a Guild of Our Lady and St. Thomas Becket linked to brewers. The first written of London brewers was in the City Letter Books in 1292 the Guild of Brewers can trace their organisation to a religious guild founded in 1342 based in All Hallows-on-the-Wall. Its first royal charter was granted by Henry VI in 1438. In 1643, Parliament imposed excise taxes on beer, ale, and malt, steadily increasing them until gin became cheaper, causing the growth of unlicensed breweries and, in 1685, James II extended the Company's jurisdiction to eight miles around London and its suburbs.

In 1739 it adopted new by-laws, which included the requirement for its liverymen to "enter into a bond [...] with the Company against any expenses of their being elected to the office of Sheriff or Lord Mayor", but as the population of London spread outwards from the City, the Company's industry influence continued to decline.

== Current Activities ==
Trustees of the Dame Alice Owen Foundation, which supports Dame Alice Owen's School, the Brewers' Company ranks 14th in the order of precedence of City Livery Companies. Its motto is In God Is All Our Trust.

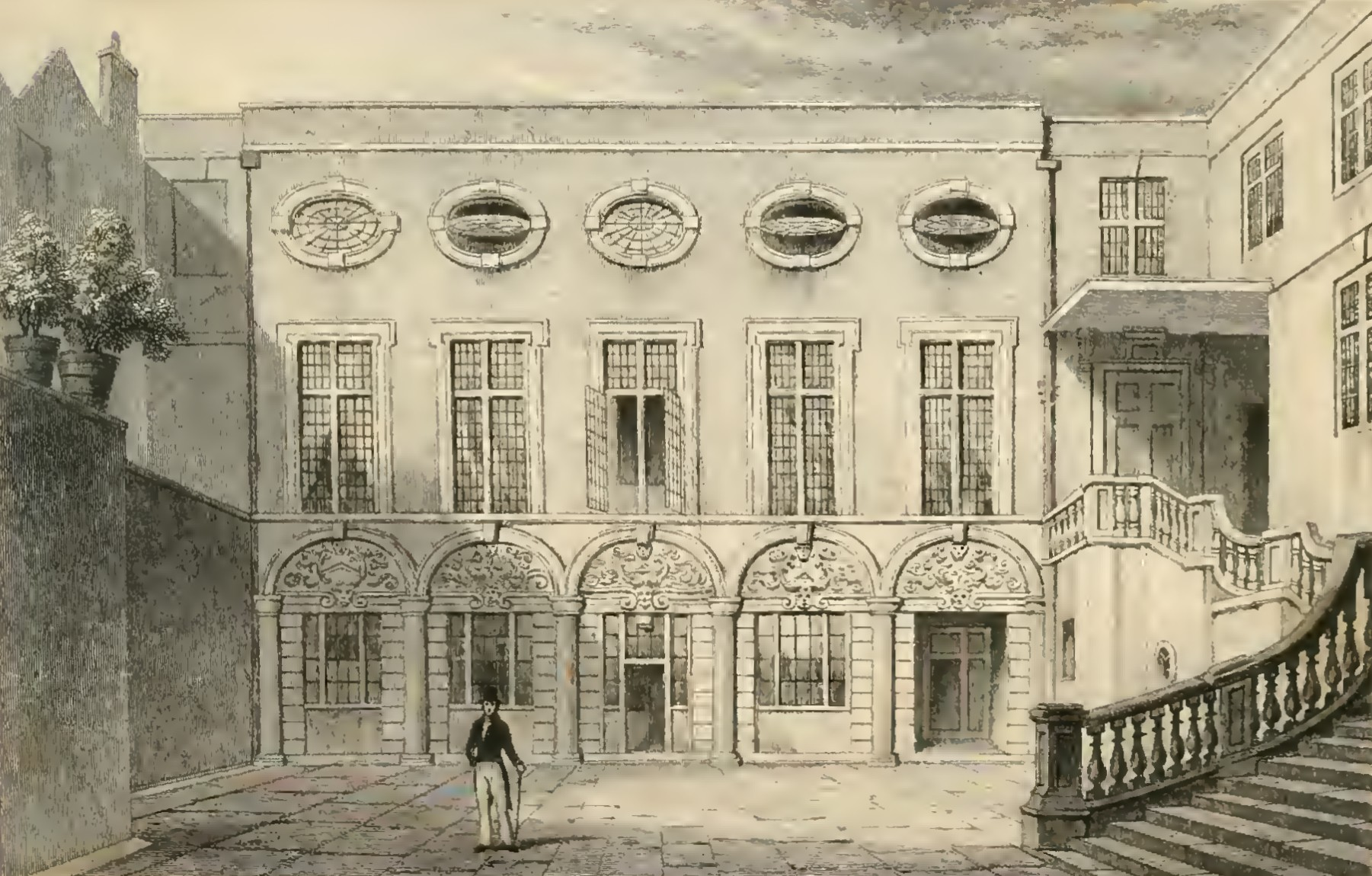
Former Brewers' Hall, destroyed in 1940

The Company's first hall was destroyed in the Great Fire of London in 1666, and its second was bombed during the Blitz in 1940. Rebuilt in 1960, the present Brewers' Hall is located at Aldermanbury Square in the City of London, being the Company's HQ as well as available on a private hire basis for events.

== See also ==
- Masters of the Worshipful Company of Brewers
- Zunft
