= Frederick Gugenheim Gregory =

British botanist (1893–1961)

- Born: Fritz Gugenheim; 22 December 1893; 236 Tufnell Park Road, Upper Holloway, London
- Died: October 27, 1961 (aged 67); Hampstead General Hospital
- Education: Imperial College London
- Known for: discovery of protein crystallography
- Awards: Royal Medal (1957); Fellow of the Royal Society
- Scientific career
- Fields: plant physiology
- Workplaces: Imperial College London

Frederick Gugenheim Gregory (22 December 1893 – 27 November 1961) was a British botanist, plant physiologist and winner of the Royal Medal.

== Education and early life ==
Gregory was born Fritz Gugenheim in London, but changed his name as a result of the anti-German sentiment during the First World War, which culminated in the destruction of his laboratory notebooks by colleagues at the Cheshunt Experimental Station. He first studied at Dame Alice Owen's School, where he was persuaded by the school science master, G. A. Armitage that he should go into science, despite his artistic skills. He left the school at the top of his class with a number of prizes and passed the intermediate exam for the University of London in mathematics, physics, chemistry and mechanics in 1912, gaining acceptance into Imperial College London.

Gregory's intention when applying had been to study chemistry, but after attending a lecture by John Bretland Farmer he switched to botany, gaining his ARCS in 1914 and BSc in 1915, both with first class honours, and also won the Forbes prize. Having been exempted from service in World War I he gained his DIC in 1917, and followed this up with an MSc in 1920 and the DSc in 1921. By this point he had joined the Research Institute in Plant Physiology at the university, and began investigating the physiology of greenhouse crops at the Cheshunt Experimental Station. While there he noticed differences in how a plant grew at different times in the year but under a constant temperature, and attempted to express this in mathematical terms using very speculative evidence; the resulting arguments made him prominent within the field.

== Career ==
After the completion of these studie, Gregory began working on the effects of electric current on plant growth under Vernon Blackman but remained interested in the study of growth, and began experimenting with that in 1919 at the Rothamsted Experimental Station, something he continued until 1937. By 1928 his work was visible and important enough that he was asked to advise the Empire Cotton Growing Corporation on their irrigation techniques in Sudan, setting up statistical studies so helpful that his final report was widely used in the development of agronomy within the country. When Blackman was appointed head of the biological laboratories at Imperial College Gregory was made assistant professor of plant physiology and assistant director of the research institute, resulting in him (for the first time in his career) having to give lectures at the university. Under Gregory the research institute became known for its work investigating vernalization, photoperiodism, transpiration and carbohydrate metabolism, with Gregory in high demand as an advisor both at the university and its various research institutes.

After Blackman's retirement in 1937 Gregory was made head of the laboratories, although work at the university was heavily disrupted by World War II. In 1947 Gregory was appointed head of the research institute as well, and focused on repairing damage from the war. This period saw increased appreciation of Gregory as a scientist; he was elected a fellow of the Royal Society in 1940, serving on its council from 1949 to 1951 and was awarded the Royal Medal in 1957 'In recognition of his distinguished studies in plant physiology.' Around the same time he was also elected a foreign member of the Indian Society of Plant Physiologists and the United States National Academy of Sciences. He retired in December 1958, and died in Hampstead General Hospital, London on 27 November 1961.
