= Orgel's rules =

Orgel's rules are a set of axioms attributed by Francis Crick to the evolutionary biologist Leslie Orgel.

== Orgel's First Rule ==
"Whenever a spontaneous process is too slow or too inefficient a protein will evolve to speed it up or make it more efficient."

This "rule" comments on the fact that there are a great number of proteins in all organisms which fulfil a number of different functions through modifying chemical or physical processes. An example would be an enzyme that catalyses a chemical reaction that would take place too slowly to benefit an organism without being sped up by this enzyme.

== Orgel's Second Rule ==
"Evolution is cleverer than you are."

This rule is well known among biologists. It does not imply that evolution has conscious motives or method but that people who say "evolution can't do this" or "evolution can't do that" are simply lacking in imagination.

Orgel's second rule tells us that the process of natural selection is not itself intelligent, clever or purposeful but that the products of evolution are ingenious.
