= Leslie Orgel =

British chemist (1927–2007)

Leslie Eleazer Orgel
- Born: 12 January 1927; London, England
- Died: 27 October 2007 (aged 80); San Diego, California, U.S.
- Education: University of Oxford; California Institute of Technology; University of Chicago
- Known for: Orgel diagram Origin of life Orgel's rules
- Awards: Fellow of the Royal Society
- Scientific career
- Fields: Chemistry
- Workplaces: University of Oxford; University of Cambridge

Leslie Eleazer Orgel FRS (12 January 1927 – 27 October 2007) was a British chemist and member of the National Academy of Sciences, known for his theories on the origin of life.

== Biography ==
Leslie Orgel was born in London on 12 January 1927. He received his Bachelor of Arts degree in chemistry with first-class honours from the University of Oxford in 1948. In 1951 he was elected a Fellow of Magdalen College, Oxford, and in 1953 was awarded his PhD in chemistry.

Orgel started his career as a theoretical inorganic chemist and continued his studies in this field at Oxford, the California Institute of Technology, and the University of Chicago.

Together with Sydney Brenner, Jack Dunitz, Dorothy Hodgkin, and Beryl M. Oughton he was one of the first people in April 1953 to see the model of the structure of DNA, constructed by Francis Crick and James Watson, at the time he and the other scientists were working at Oxford University's Chemistry Department. According to the late Dr. Beryl Oughton, later Rimmer, they all travelled together in two cars once Dorothy Hodgkin announced to them that they were off to Cambridge to see the model of the structure of DNA. All were impressed by the new DNA model, especially Brenner who subsequently worked with Crick; Orgel himself also worked with Crick at the Salk Institute for Biological Studies.

In 1955 he joined the chemistry department at Cambridge University. There he did work in transition metal chemistry and ligand field theory, published several peer-reviewed journal articles, and wrote a textbook entitled Transition Metal Chemistry: Ligand Field Theory (1960). He developed the Orgel diagram showing the energies of electronic terms in transition metal complexes.

Orgel formulated his protein-translation error-catastrophe theory of aging in 1963, (prior to the use of the term by Manfred Eigen for mutational error catastrophe) which has since been experimentally challenged.

In 1964, Orgel was appointed senior fellow and research professor at the Salk Institute for Biological Studies in La Jolla, California, where he directed the Chemical Evolution Laboratory. He was also an adjunct professor in the Department of Chemistry and Biochemistry at the University of California, San Diego, and he was one of five principal investigators in the NASA-sponsored NSCORT program in exobiology. Orgel also participated in NASA's Viking Mars Lander Program as a member of the Molecular Analysis Team that designed the gas chromatography mass spectrometer instrument that robots took to the planet Mars.

Orgel's lab came across an economical way to make cytarabine, a compound that is one of today's most commonly used anti-cancer agents.

Together with Stanley Miller, Orgel also suggested that peptide nucleic acids – rather than ribonucleic acids – constituted the first pre-biotic systems capable of self-replication on early Earth.

His name is popularly known because of Orgel's rules, credited to him, particularly Orgel's Second Rule: "Evolution is cleverer than you are."

In his book The Origins of Life, Orgel coined the concept of specified complexity, to describe the criterion by which living organisms are distinguished from non-living matter. He published over three hundred articles in his research areas.

In 1993, Orgel presented at the "What is Life?" Conference at Trinity College in Dublin, Ireland along with many other prominent scientists exploring the origin of life research such as Manfred Eigen, John Maynard Smith and Stephen Jay Gould. Orgel's talk was on "Molecular Structure and Disordered Crystals."

Orgel died of pancreatic cancer on 27 October 2007 at the San Diego Hospice & Palliative Care in San Diego, California.

== Research on the origin of life ==
=== Nucleobase synthesis ===
Orgel proposed a novel solution to a problem with Juan Oro's proposed mechanism of nucleobase synthesis on the early Earth, which relied on the reaction of five molecules of hydrogen cyanide (HCN) to form adenine. The problem with this was that it would require much more concentrated hydrogen cyanide than evidence suggested was present.

Orgel suggested that the hydrogen cyanide was frozen in solution. This would concentrate HCN molecules in the spaces in between the crystal lattice of ice, and also solve the problem of HCN being too volatile in a liquid water solution.

=== Nucleoside formation ===
For nucleoside (nucleobase + ribose sugar) synthesis, Orgel suggested an almost opposite approach, heating a mixture of ribose and the purine nucleobases hypoxanthine, adenine, and guanine to dryness in the presence of magnesium ions. This reaction puts the glycosidic bond in the correct position in two ways: the nucleobase attaches to the correct carbon on ribose, and in the correct orientation (the beta anomer).

However, the synthesis was later criticised because it only worked most with hypoxanthine, a nucleobase that is not relevant to current life on Earth, and because it was not specific for the ribose sugar and could instead be applied to other sugars.

=== RNA polymerization ===
Continuing his work studying the prebiotic synthesis of RNA, Orgel explored mechanisms by which inorganic phosphate and nucleotide phosphoryl groups could be chemically activated for condensation into nucleic acid polymers. Starting in the 1960s, Orgel explored a variety of cyanide-based activating agents which could have plausibly been present on a young earth. A carbodiimide reagent was found to be effective at activating nucleotide phosphoryl groups and promoting the formation of short Adenosine dimers and trimers. In 2018, John D. Sutherland and co-workers proposed that methyl isocyanide and acetaldehyde could combine to form a pre-biotic phosphate activating agent which could plausibly have formed under early-earth conditions.

Orgel also theorised that one single strand of RNA could have been the template for the first life on Earth and that these imidazole-activated nucleotides could have used this RNA template strand to polymerise and replicate. Lohrmann and Orgel reported that the phosphorimidazolide derivative of adenosine monophosphate (in which a phosphoryl group oxygen is substituted by an imidazole ring) forms short adenosine oligomers in the presence of poly-uridine templates. They further discovered that the divalent metal cation used to catalyze the reaction influenced the regiochemistry of the inter-nucleotide linkage. Pb^{2+} gave primarily 5'-2' linked nucleotides while Zn^{2+} gave primarily 5'-3' linked nucleotides from guanosine phosphorimidazolides in the presence of a poly-cytidine template. Montmorillonite clay was also shown to promote the polymerization of adenosine phosphorimidazolide into oligonucleotides tens of bases in length starting from a poly-adenosine 10-mer primer. In the absence of montmorillonite, the primer was capped through the formation of a 5' adenosine pyrophosphate.

The oligonucleotide products in early studies were typically characterized through a combination of ^{14}C radiolabeling, gel electrophoresis, and paper electrophoresis. Enzymatic digestion was used to differentiate regioisomers. The advent of HPLC allowed the characterization of long oligomers of guanosine.

=== Directed panspermia ===
Though he later downplayed the hypothesis, Orgel, along with Francis Crick, proposed a detailed panspermia scenario for the origin of life on Earth, going so far as to suggest that life on Earth was designed by an alien species and sent to Earth. They proposed a design for the spaceship that aliens could have used to seed life on Earth.

=== RNA world ===
In the late 1960s, Orgel proposed that life was based on RNA before it was based on DNA or proteins. His theory included genes based on RNA and RNA enzymes. This view would be developed and shaped into the now widely accepted RNA world hypothesis.

Almost thirty years later, Orgel wrote a lengthy review of the RNA World hypothesis. This review highlighted many proposed syntheses for RNA and its parts in abiotic conditions, noted the significance of the discovery of ribozymes (RNA molecules that function as enzymes just as Orgel had once predicted) and at the same time, demonstrated nucleic acid polymers with alternatives to ribose such as threose nucleic acid (TNA) and peptide nucleic acid (PNA).

In conclusion, Orgel wrote, "One must recognize that, despite considerable progress, the problem of the origin of the RNA World is far from being solved."

== Awards ==
- Elected to the National Academy of Sciences in 1990.
- Elected as a Fellow of the Royal Society of London in 1962.
- American Academy of Arts and Sciences

== Books ==
- Leslie E. Orgel, An Introduction to Transition-Metal Chemistry. The Ligand Field Theory, 1961
- Leslie E. Orgel, The Origins of Life: Molecules and Natural Selection, 1973
- Leslie E. Orgel and Stanley L. Miller, The Origins of Life on the Earth, 1974
