= James Butler (artist) =

British sculptor (1931–2022)

James Walter Butler MBE RA (25 July 1931 – 26 March 2022) was a British sculptor most famous for his 1980 statue of Richard III in Leicester.

Butler was educated at Maidstone Grammar School and studied art at Saint Martin's School of Art and the Royal College of Art. For ten years he was a professional stone carver. He taught sculpture and drawing at the City and Guilds of London Art School and was visiting professor to the Royal Academy Schools. He was elected to the Royal Academy of Arts in 1964 and was a member of the Royal West of England Academy and fellow of the Royal British Society of Sculptors.

Butler's works exist in private collections throughout the world and he undertook numerous public commissions. He designed the current version of the British Great Seal. Butler was appointed Member of the Order of the British Empire (MBE) in the 2009 New Year Honours.

Butler was asked to commission a memorial in dedication to the 167th Infantry Regiment of the World War I Rainbow Division in New Croix Rouge Farm, France.

== Gallery ==
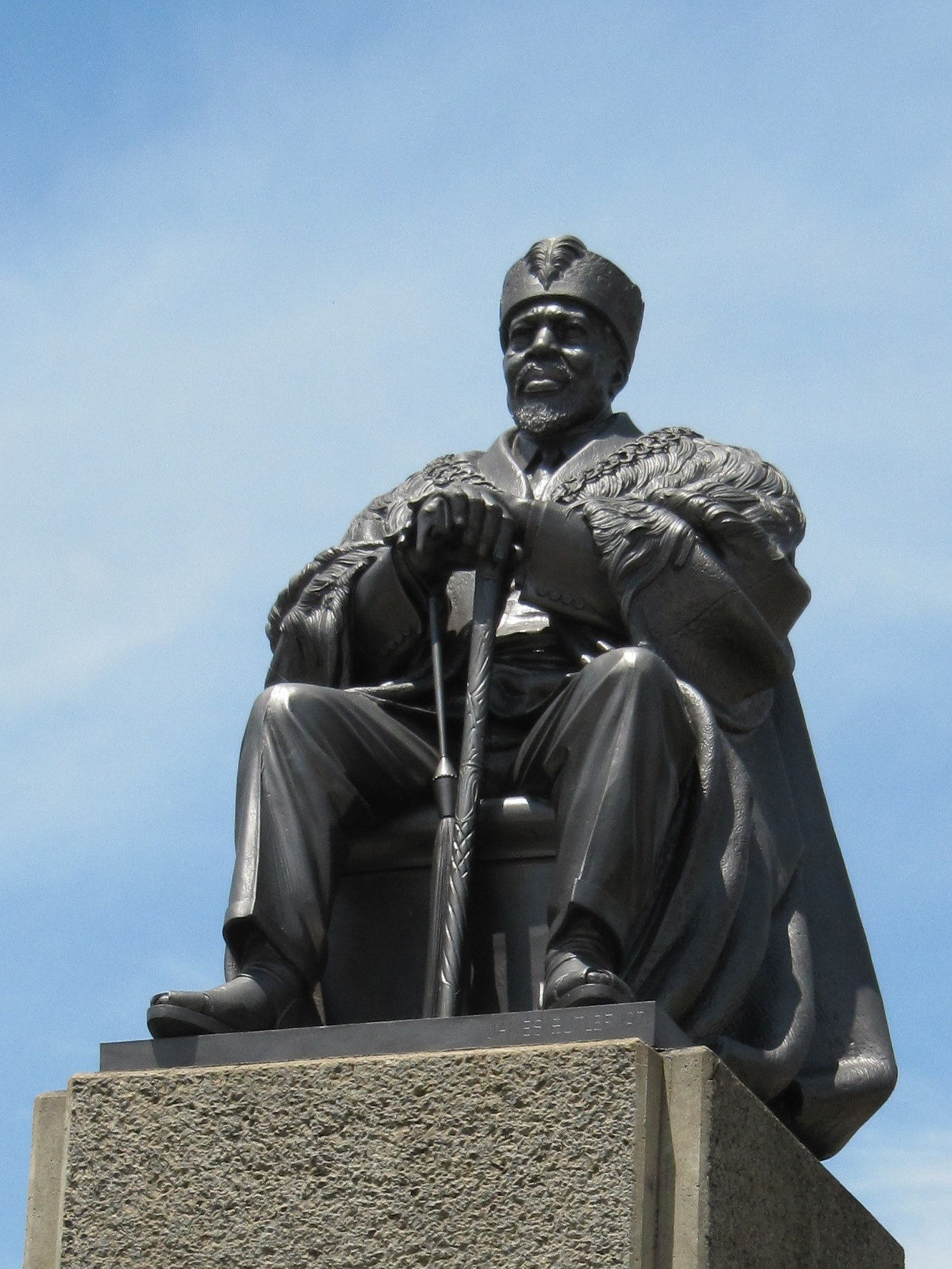
Statue of Jomo Kenyatta (1971) in Nairobi

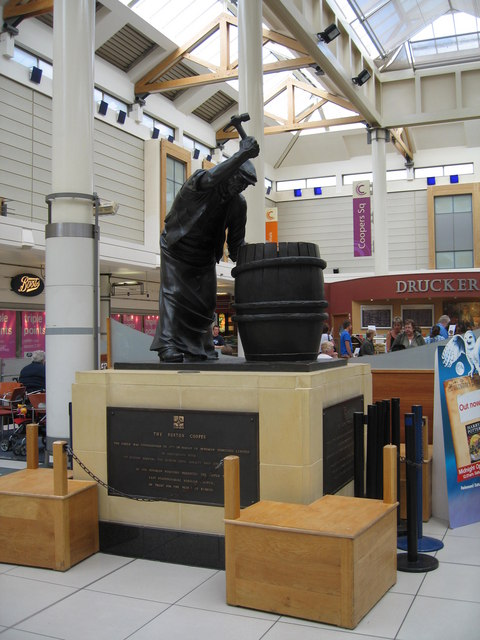
The Burton Cooper (1977), Cooper's Square Shopping Centre, Burton on Trent. The bronze sculpture depicts a local craftsman. It originally stood opposite the market but was moved in 1994.

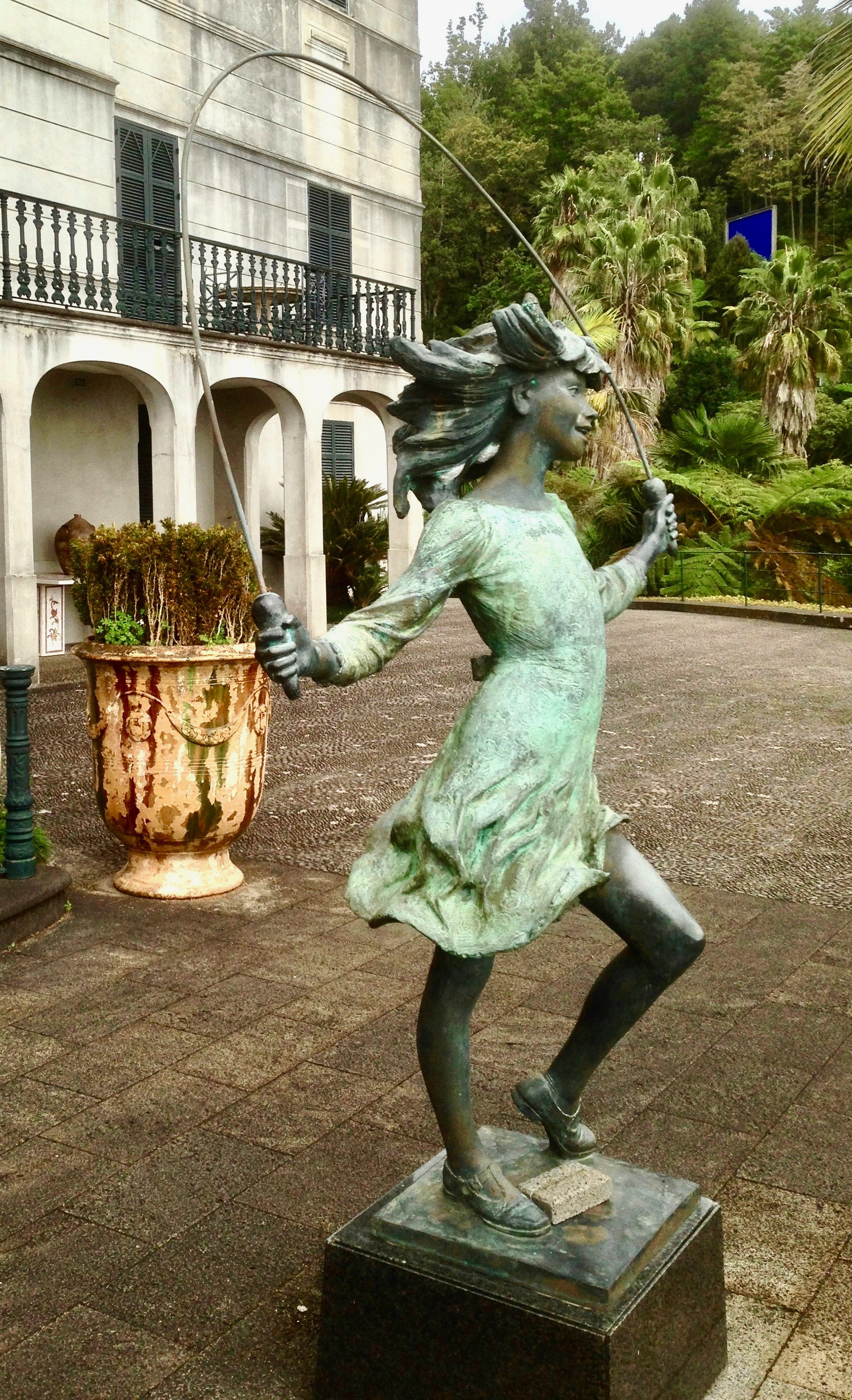
Girl skipping rope, bronze sculpture (1987) at Monte Palace Gardens, Funchal, Madeira

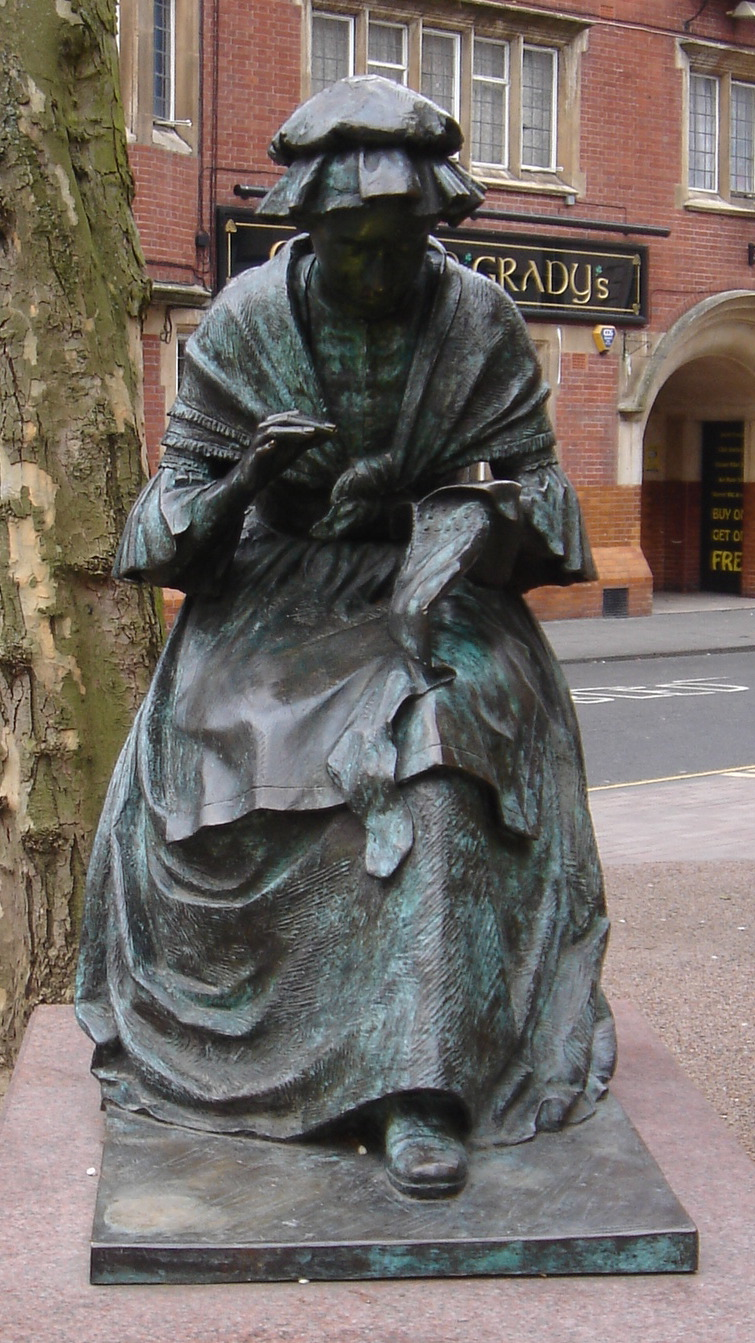
The Leicester Seamstress by Butler (1990), Leicester, Hotel Street

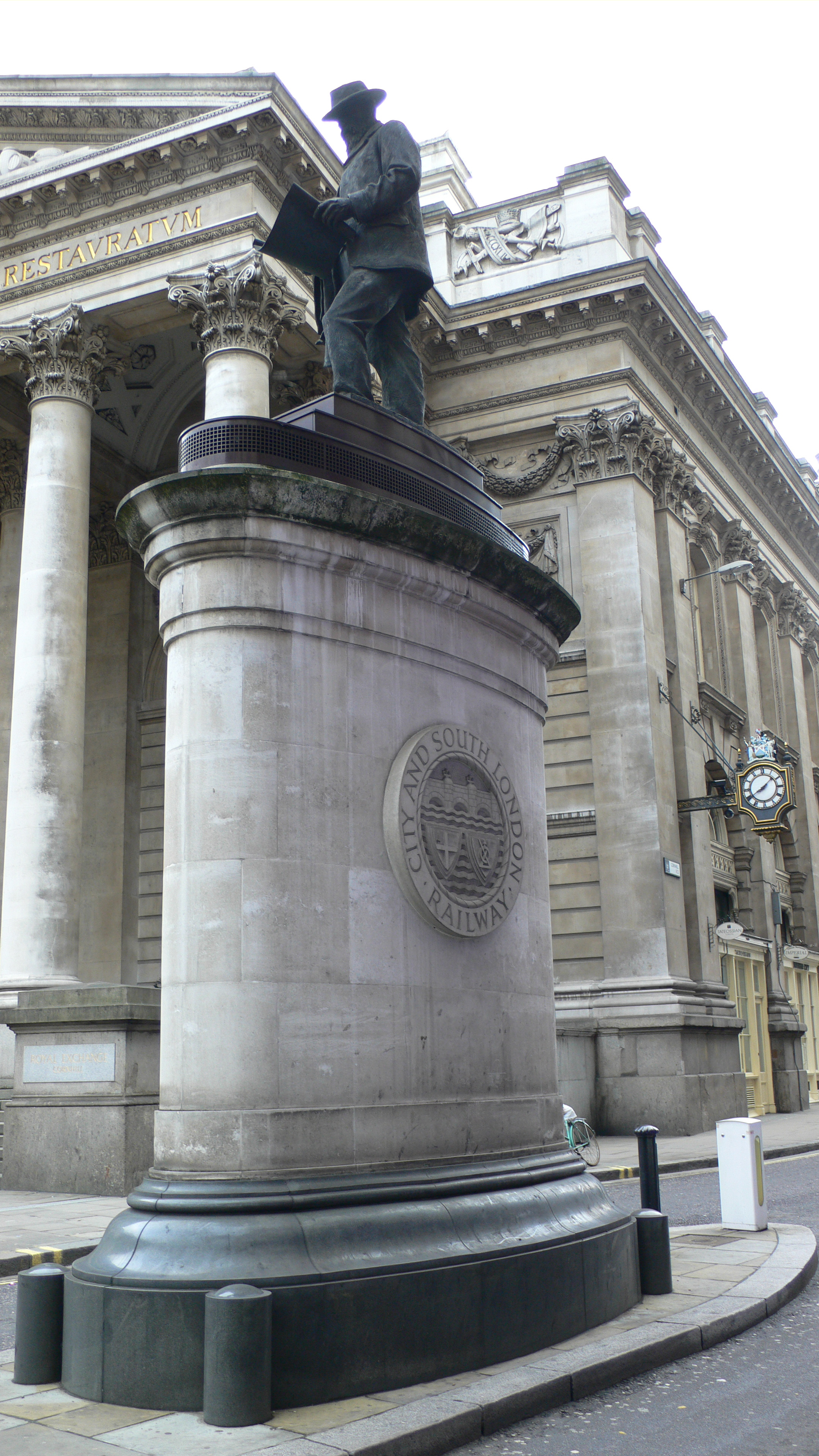
Statue of James Henry Greathead, railway engineer in Cornhill, London, EC3. Unveiled on 17 January 1994.

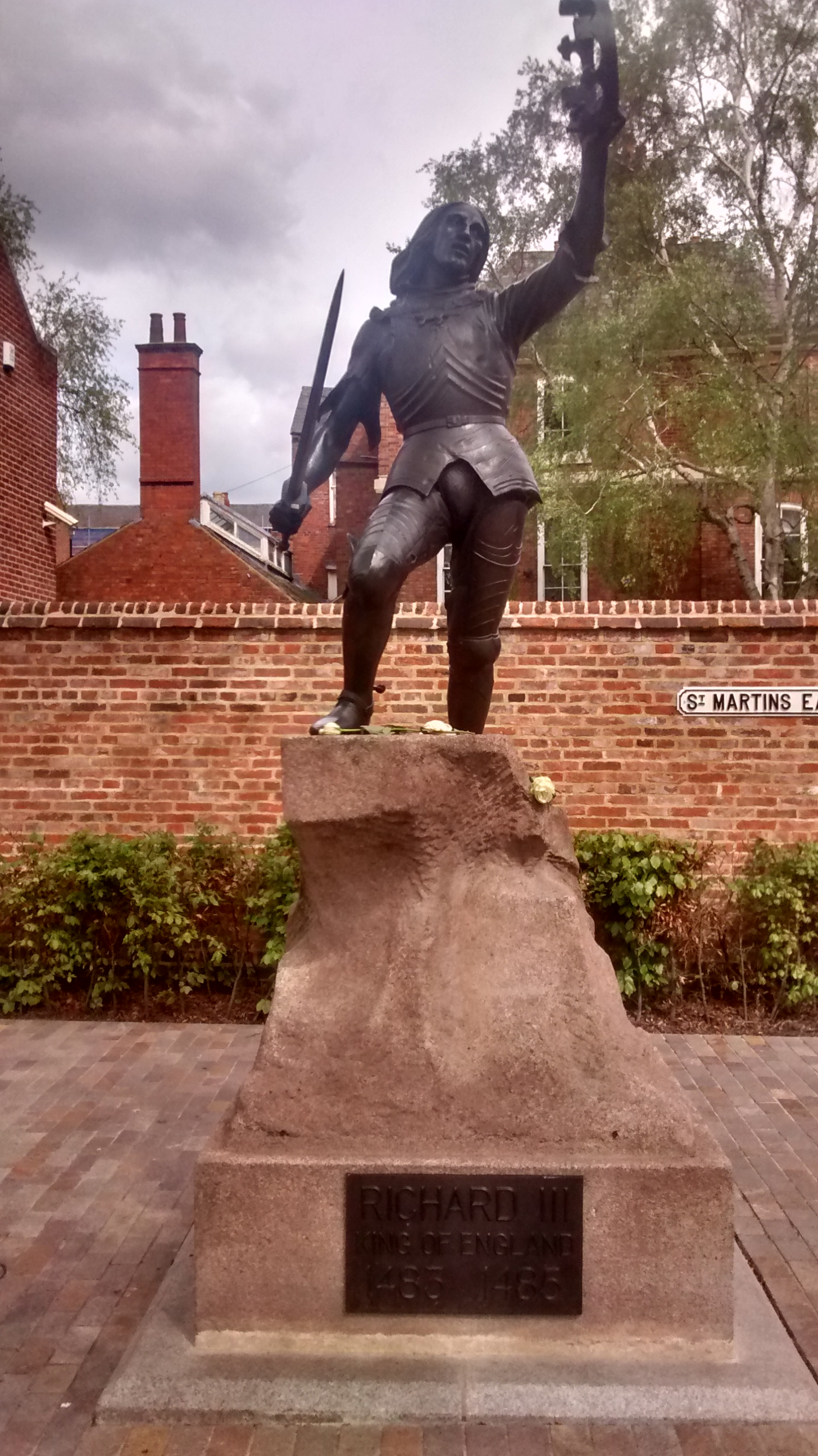
Statue of Richard III outside Leicester Cathedral

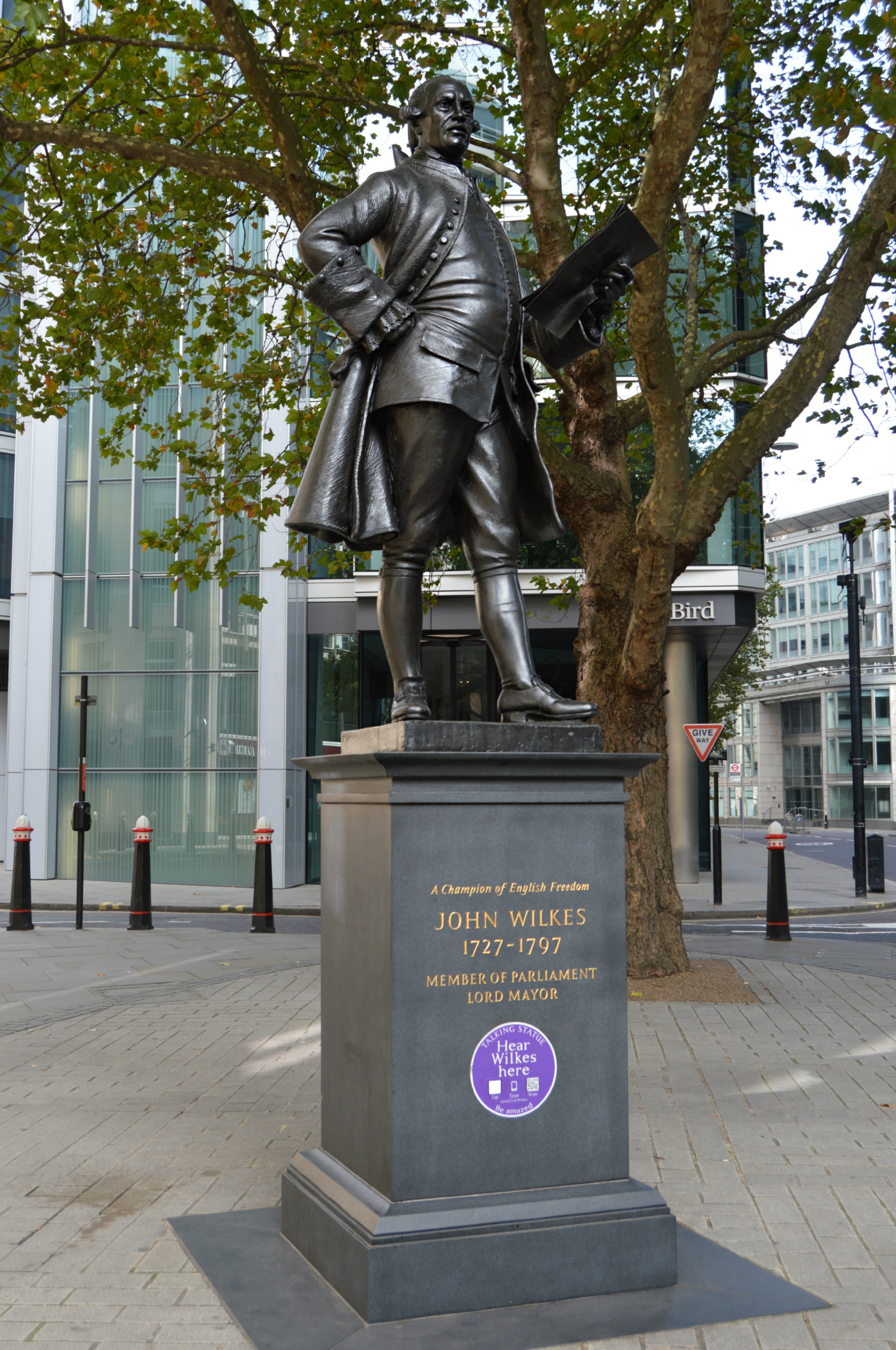
Statue of John Wilkes, radical politician in London. Unveiled on 31 October 1988.

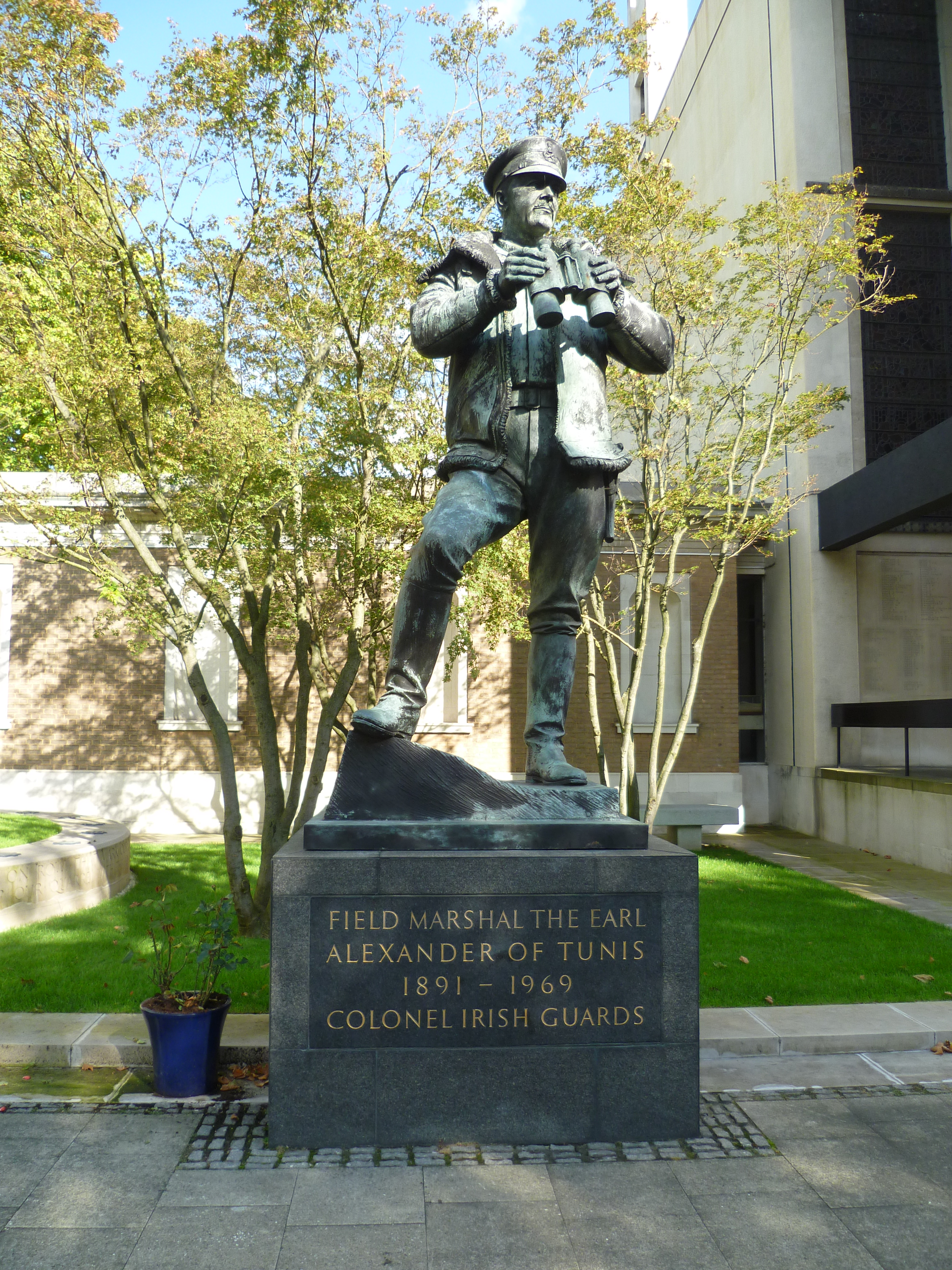
Statue of Harold Alexander, commander in World War II. Unveiled on 9 May 1985.
