= Anarchy in the U.K: Live at the 76 Club =

Anarchy in the UK: Live at the 76 Club

Live album by Sex Pistols
- Released: October 1978
- Recorded: 24 September 1976
- Genre: Punk rock

Professional ratings
Review scores
| Source | Rating |
|---|---|
| AllMusic | 2.5/5 stars |

Anarchy in the UK: Live at the 76 Club is a live album by the English punk rock band the Sex Pistols. It was recorded live at the 76 Club in Burton upon Trent. Prior to its formal release, the album had made its way around Sex Pistols fans as a bootleg, most commonly under the title Indecent Exposure in which form it was first issued in 1978, though the number of tracks included varies. In 2001 the album was remastered and re-released on Yeaah Records as "The 76 Club".

== Track listing ==
All songs by the Sex Pistols except where noted.

1. "Anarchy in the U.K."
2. "I Wanna Be Me"
3. "Seventeen" (titled "I'm a Lazy Sod")
4. "New York" (titled "Dolls (New York)")
5. "No Lip" (titled "Don't Give Me No Lip, Child") (Dave Berry)
6. "(I'm Not Your) Steppin' Stone" (Tommy Boyce, Bobby Hart)
7. "Satellite"
8. "Submission"
9. "Liar"
10. "Substitute" (Pete Townshend)
11. "No Feelings"
12. "No Fun" (Alexander, Asheton, Asheton, Pop)
13. "Pretty Vacant"
14. "PA Trouble"
15. "Problems"

== Personnel ==
- Johnny Rotten - lead vocals
- Steve Jones - guitar, backing vocals
- Glen Matlock - bass, backing vocals
- Paul Cook - drums, percussion
