= Dame Paulet's Almshouses =

Former almshouses in Burton-upon-Trent, UK

Coordinates: 52.8015°N 1.6311°W

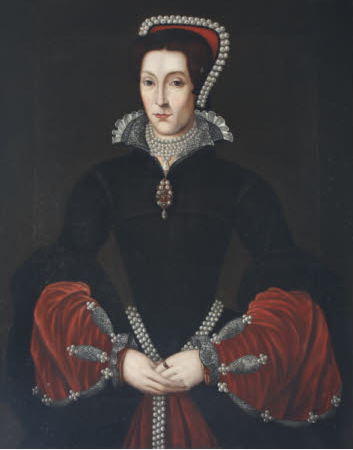
Dame Paulet, during her marriage to Sir Thomas Pope

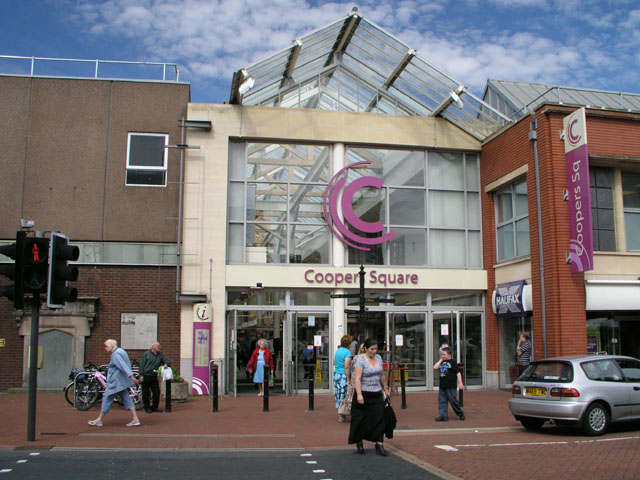
The surviving doorway set into the wall to the left of the Coopers Square entrance

Dame Paulet's Almshouses were established by Dame Elizabeth Paulet near the marketplace of Burton upon Trent, Staffordshire in 1593 to provide accommodation and support for five elderly, poor women of the town. The almshouse ceased to be used for accommodation in 1871–72, with the women moved into new houses. The structure was afterwards used as a post office and weights and measures office before falling derelict. The remains were demolished in 1974 when Coopers Square shopping precinct was built. A doorway from the 1593 structure survives and is preserved in an external wall of Primark.

== Foundation ==
Elizabeth Blount was born in Burton upon Trent, where her family was prominent. Her parents were the M.P. Walter Blount of Nether Hall, Burton and later of Blount's Hall, Staffordshire, and his wife Margaret or Mary. Her first marriage was to Anthony Beresford of Thorpe, Derbyshire. She then married Sir Thomas Pope, a wealthy landowner who founded Trinity College, Oxford. Pope's death left Elizabeth a rich widow and she afterwards married Sir Hugh Paulet. She died in 1593 and was buried, with Thomas Pope and his second wife Margaret, in a tomb she had built in the chapel at Trinity College.

In 1593 Elizabeth, who was then Dame Paulet, made provisions for the support of poor women in Burton. She granted the income from land at Fenny Bentley, Derbyshire and an annuity from property at Clerkenwell, Middlesex to a trust which was directed to provide for five elderly and unmarried women of the town. The women were housed in an almshouse in the High Street, to the west of the marketplace. The structure was of two storeys, a lower floor with five rooms and an upper floor with one large room. The women supported by the trust were generally widows; as well as free accommodation in the almshouse the women received 26s 8d, a gown, smock and an apron each year.

== Operation ==
From 1789 the women were also provided with free coal by Burton upon Trent's town lands charity. The women to be supported were selected by the trustees who were replaced in this role in 1791 by the feoffees of the town lands charity. From 1823 the upper floor of the almshouse was not used by the women and was let out as a granary. The Dame Paulet almhouses trust used any surplus income to pay for the maintenance of the almshouse structure. By the 1690s the trust received additional income from lands at Chelmorton, Derbyshire from an unknown benefactor. By 1709 the trust reported an annual income of £20 15s. It lost the Clerkenwell annuity by 1764, though its income had nevertheless increased to £43 5s. The annual stipend to the five women had risen to £10 10s by the 1780s and was raised to £12 10s in 1807 and again to £15 in 1821. By 1823 the annual income of the trust was £81 17s, rising to £91 16s in 1861.

== Legacy ==
The Dame Paulet almshouse trust, together with the town lands charity and other almshouse trusts in the town, was incorporated into the Consolidated Charity of Burton-Upon-Trent, established in 1861 and, in 1871–72, the women from Paulet's, Parker's and Johnson's almshouses were rehoused in newly-built almhouses in Wellington Street. Much of the Dame Paulet almshouse was demolished and a post office established on the site. It was later used as a weights and measures office. The building remained in reasonable condition until 1914 but was largely derelict by 1974 when it was demolished as part of the construction of the Coopers Square shopping precinct.

The almshouse's original sixteenth century doorway survives and has been incorporated into the exterior wall of a Primark store in the shopping precinct, as a "door to nowhere". The decorative stone doorway has a large pediment marked with the date of construction and surmounted with the coat of arms of the Blount family. In the 1930s the doorway was restored. A stone mason re-engraved the date which had been partly obliterated. He mis-read the original inscription of "Anno Domini" as "No Domini" and decided to engrave it as "No Domi Ni" to make it more symmetrical. The carving remains to this day. As part of the 1974 works a commemorative tablet was installed in the centre of the doorway to mark the redevelopment of the town centre.
