= The Burton Cooper =

1977 English statue by James Butler

Coordinates: 52°48′07.1″N 1°37′56.4″W

- Interactive map of The Burton Cooper
- Designer: James Walter Butler
- Completion date: 1977

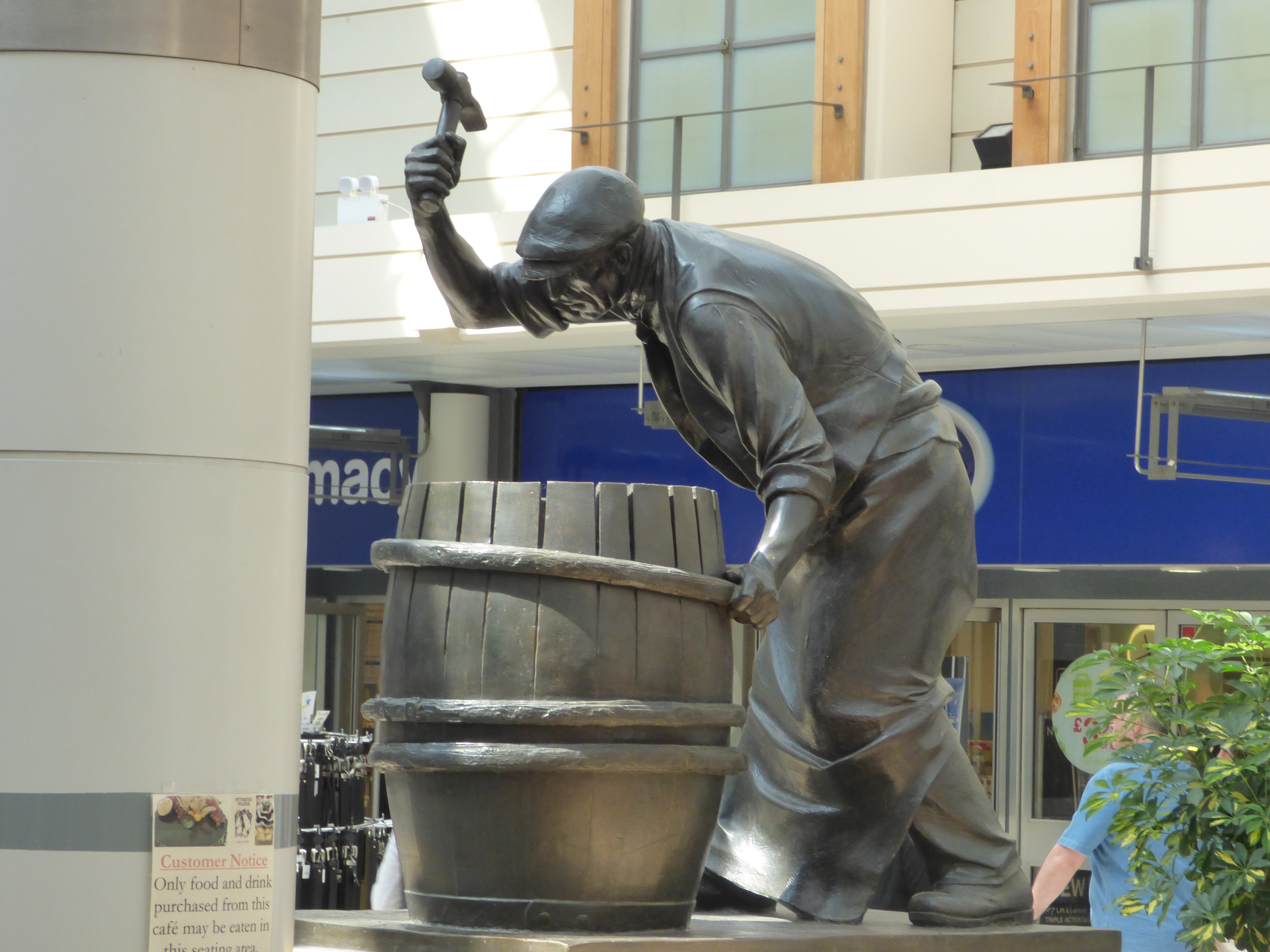
Left-side view of the statue

The Burton Cooper is a 1977 statue by James Walter Butler currently located in Coopers Square shopping centre, Burton upon Trent. The statue commemorates the close connection of the town to the trade, which was key to Burton's brewing industry. Originally situated outdoors, the statue was relocated inside the centre when it was refurbished in 1994.

== Background ==
Brewing in Burton has a long history, with large parts of the town given over to the industry. In the past, almost all beer brewed would have spent time in a wooden barrel or cask either in the Burton Union fermentation process, in aging casks or for transport. Burton's coopers were responsible for manufacturing the barrels by hand and refurbishing those that returned to the brewery. Historically the coopers yards in Burton took up as much space as the breweries themselves.

== Sculpture ==
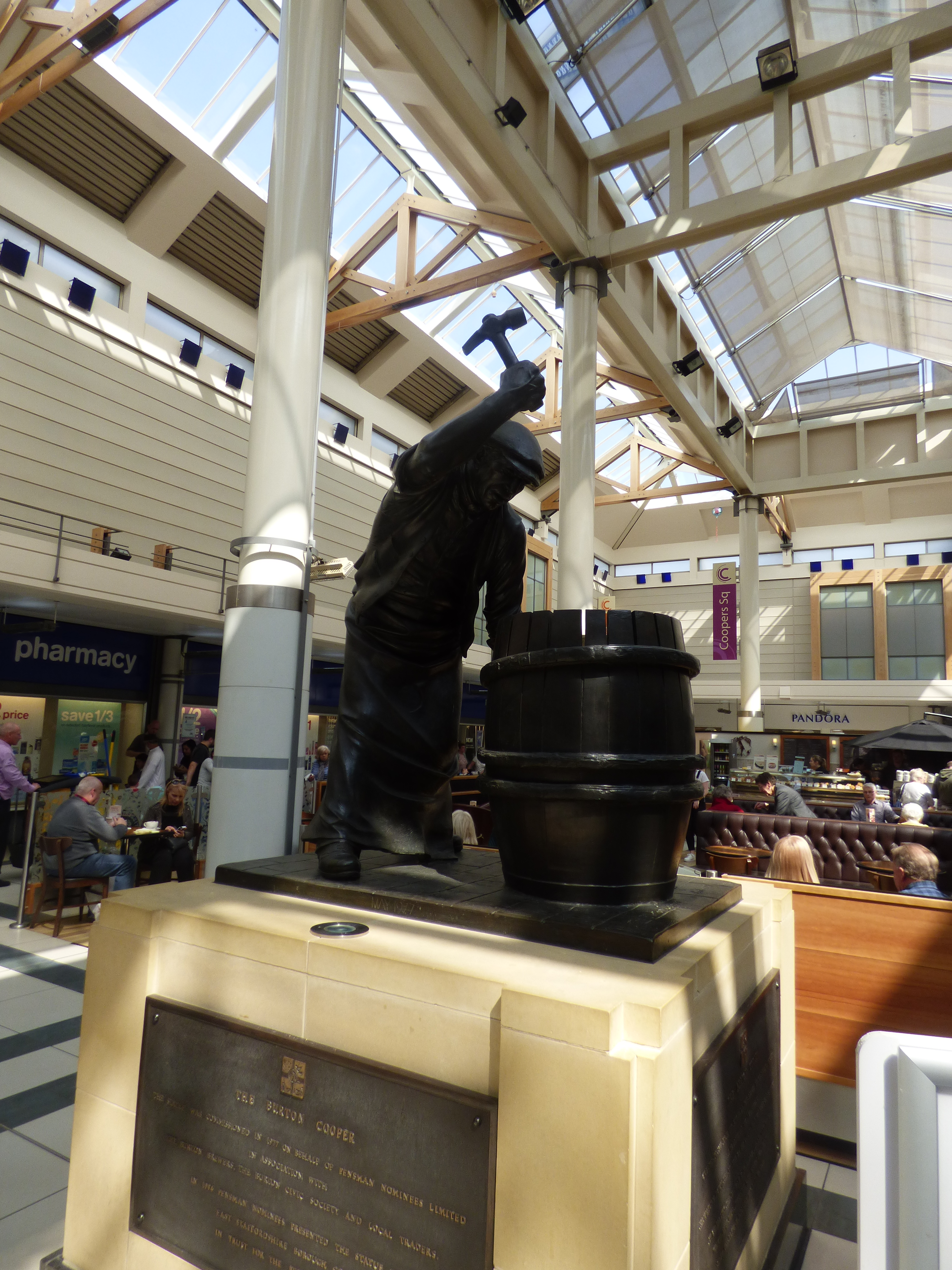
Right-side view of statue and plinth

The sculpture was proposed by Burton's civic society, who thought that the completion of the Coopers Square shopping centre in the town should be marked by a large public artwork. The work was commissioned by Pensman Nominees Ltd, with financial contributions from local brewers Allied Breweries, Bass-Charrington, Marston, Thompson and Evershed and Everards as well as the Burton Civic Society and local traders. It was decided that a statue of a cooper was appropriate and James Walter Butler was awarded the commission – one of his earliest for public art. Butler visited a cooperage at Bass-Charrington to study the work of two contemporary coopers, and took photographs from which he made a preliminary model.

The work was completed in bronze and depicts a single figure, a cooper, at work making a barrel. The cooper is shown in the act of hammering down a temporary shaping truss to hold the wooden staves in place before the permanent iron hoops are fitted. The subject wears the traditional clothing of his trade which includes a floor length apron, with a single hole that was customary for Burton cooper's aprons. The cooper is depicted in a realistic style and Noszlopy and Waterhouse (2005) describe the careful attention to detail with which the man's clothing and veins on his left hand are rendered. They also complimented the sense of movement in the piece, which they said was best appreciated from the side views. The statue is engraved with the name of the piece and the artist's signature and date ("Butler 77").

The figure of the cooper, in part-crouched pose, stands at 1.5 metres (4.9 ft) in height. It stands atop a marble plinth of 1.21 metres (4.0 ft) height, 1.69 metres (5.5 ft) length and 1.63 metres (5.3 ft) width. There is a plaque on each face of the plinth. The plaque on the front describes the history of the commission and the ownership of the statue. The one on the rear notes the formal opening of the shopping centre on 24 March 1970 by Princess Alexandra and the opening of the improved centre by the Mayor of East Staffordshire on 9 February 1995. One of the plaques on the side describes the activity being depicted and its association with the brewing industry. The other plaque notes that two time capsules are buried beneath the statue, each containing five items suggested by local children as symbolic of Burton in the 1990s.

== History ==
The statue was installed at the St Modwen's Walk entrance to the shopping centre in 1977. It was located in the open air opposite the market square. In refurbishments to the shopping centre undertaken in 1994, the area was roofed over and enclosed, and it was proposed to move the statue within the centre. The Burton Civic Society objected to the move, stating that people would be unable to view the statue outside of the centre's open hours. Despite this, the statue was relocated to the middle of the centre in October 1994. In the same year, the statue was gifted to East Staffordshire Borough Council by Pensman Nominees. Noszlopy and Waterhouse noted in 2005 that the current setting of the statue, surrounded by plants and café tables, is less suitable than its original setting which was more open.

A replica of the statue is located at the entrance of the National Brewery Centre, the former Bass company museum. Steele, writing in 2013, notes that the cooper has become a symbol of the town.
