= Walter Blount (by 1501 – 1543 or later) =

English politician

Walter Blount (by 1501 – 1543 or later) was an English politician.

He was a member (MP) of the parliament of England for Stafford in 1542.

He married Margaret or Mary Sutton and had two sons and four daughters, including Elizabeth, who married Thomas Pope and then Hugh Paulet.
