= Finney's post =

Coordinates: 52.80162°N 1.63076°W

Finney's Post is part of an ornate mediaeval oak post, which came from a building at the corner of the Market Place and High Street, Burton upon Trent, Staffordshire, England.

Legend has it that this post caused an apparently-dead woman (Mrs Albert Finney) to be brought back to life when her coffin crashed into the post.

Mrs Finney lived in Clay's Lane, Stapenhill and was a baker's assistant. After the incident described in that reference, she became ill with consumption/TB and died at the age of 36 years. She was buried at Bretby churchyard.

The post was formerly housed in the Burton Town Museum which closed around 1980. From then until 2007 it was on display at the Meadowside Leisure Centre in the town in a glass case.

In July 2007 the post was supposedly "given away" to the Victoria and Albert Museum by the East Staffordshire Borough Council causing a furore in the town.

Further investigation shows that the post had been purchased by the V and A in 1922 and then loaned back to Burton Town Museum. This was planned to have only been for a matter of months but for some reason the post remained in Burton until 2007. The "controversy" as reported in the local press was therefore not warranted. The post is now displayed in the Architecture Section of the V and A.

== Inscription on the Post ==
'This Post, as Finney's Legend saith,

Awoke a Scolding Wife from Death;

But when at length she ceas'd to breathe,

And honest Finney ceased to grieve,

'oh shun' he said, as borne along,

With solemn dirge and funeral song.

'Oh shun, my friends, that cruel Stump

That gave my dear so hard a Bump.'

J.S.
