= Statue of James Henry Greathead, London =

Statue in the City of London

Statue of James Henry Greathead
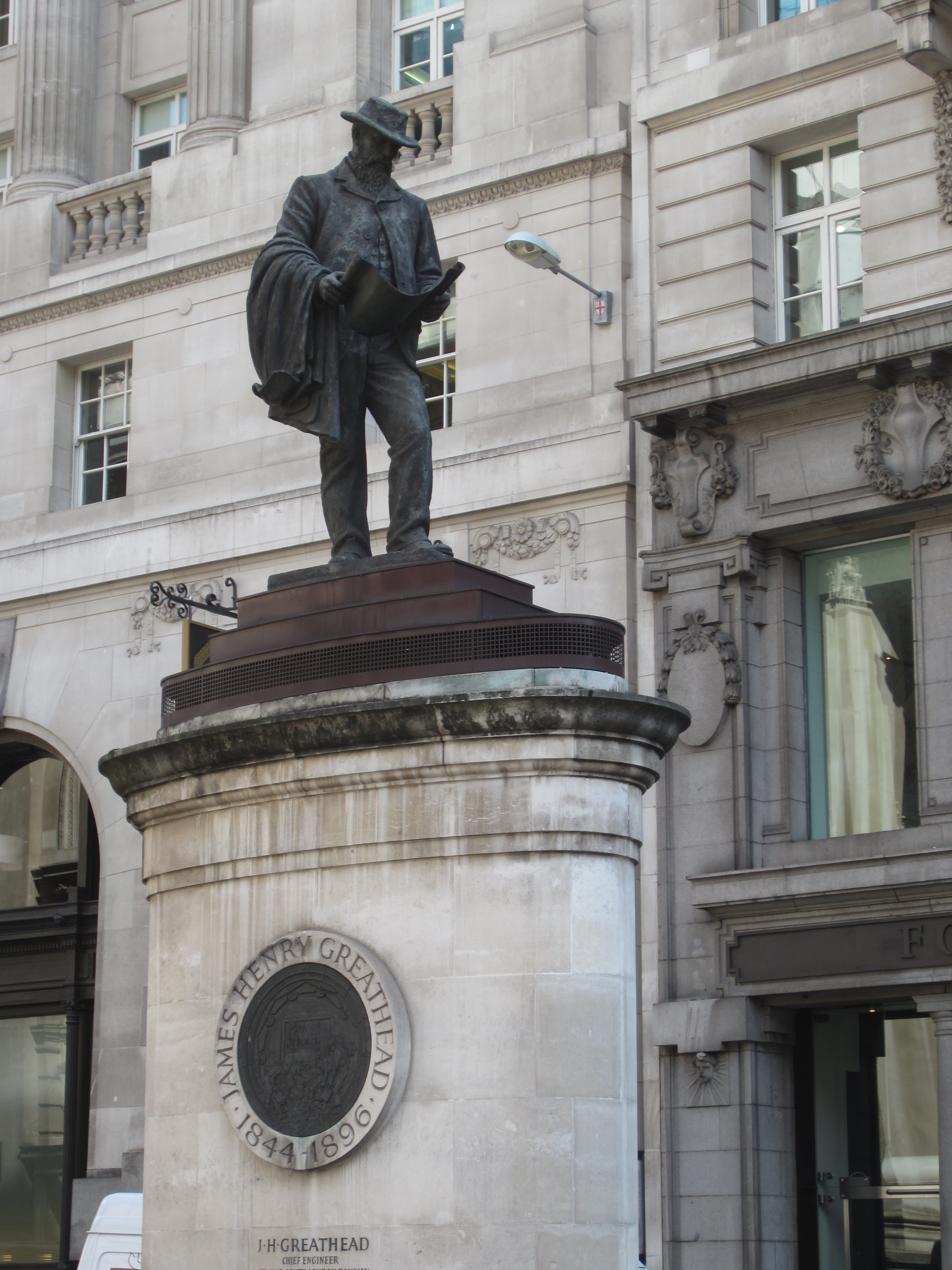
- The statue
- Artist: James Butler
- Subject: James Henry Greathead
- Location: London, United Kingdom; 51°30′48″N 0°05′17″W

The statue of James Henry Greathead, designed by James Butler, is installed outside the Royal Exchange, where it conceals a ventilation shaft. It was erected in 1994 on a traffic island in the middle of Cornhill, London, with traffic passing to either side, similar to the statue of Prince Albert at Holborn Circus. The London Troops War Memorial is nearby.

== Background ==
James Henry Greathead was a South African born English civil engineer best known for his work on the railway lines now incorporated into the London Underground. Greathead was an engineer on the London (City) & Southwark Subway, later the City and South London Railway, and now part of the Northern line, which has a station near to the statue at Bank.

== Description and history ==
The bronze statue depicts a bearded Greathead wearing a broad-brimmed hat (an allusion to his South African origins) and carrying a coat over his right arm, holding a piece of paper which he is reading. It stands on a hollow oval Portland stone base with granite plinth. The base bears a bronze plaque on one side depicting a tunnelling shield with an inscription that credits Greathead as being the "inventor of the travelling shield that made possible the cutting of the tunnels of London's deep level tube system". (A part of the tunnelling shield used at Bank station was rediscovered during a refurbishment, and left visible painted red in a passageway leading to the Waterloo & City line.) The other side of the base bears the carved stone badge of the City & South London Railway.

Visible in a gap between the statue and the base are the metal grilles of a vent shaft installed at Bank Junction to meet safety standards introduced after the King's Cross fire in 1987. The statute was unveiled by the Lord Mayor of London Sir Paul Newell on 17 January 1994.

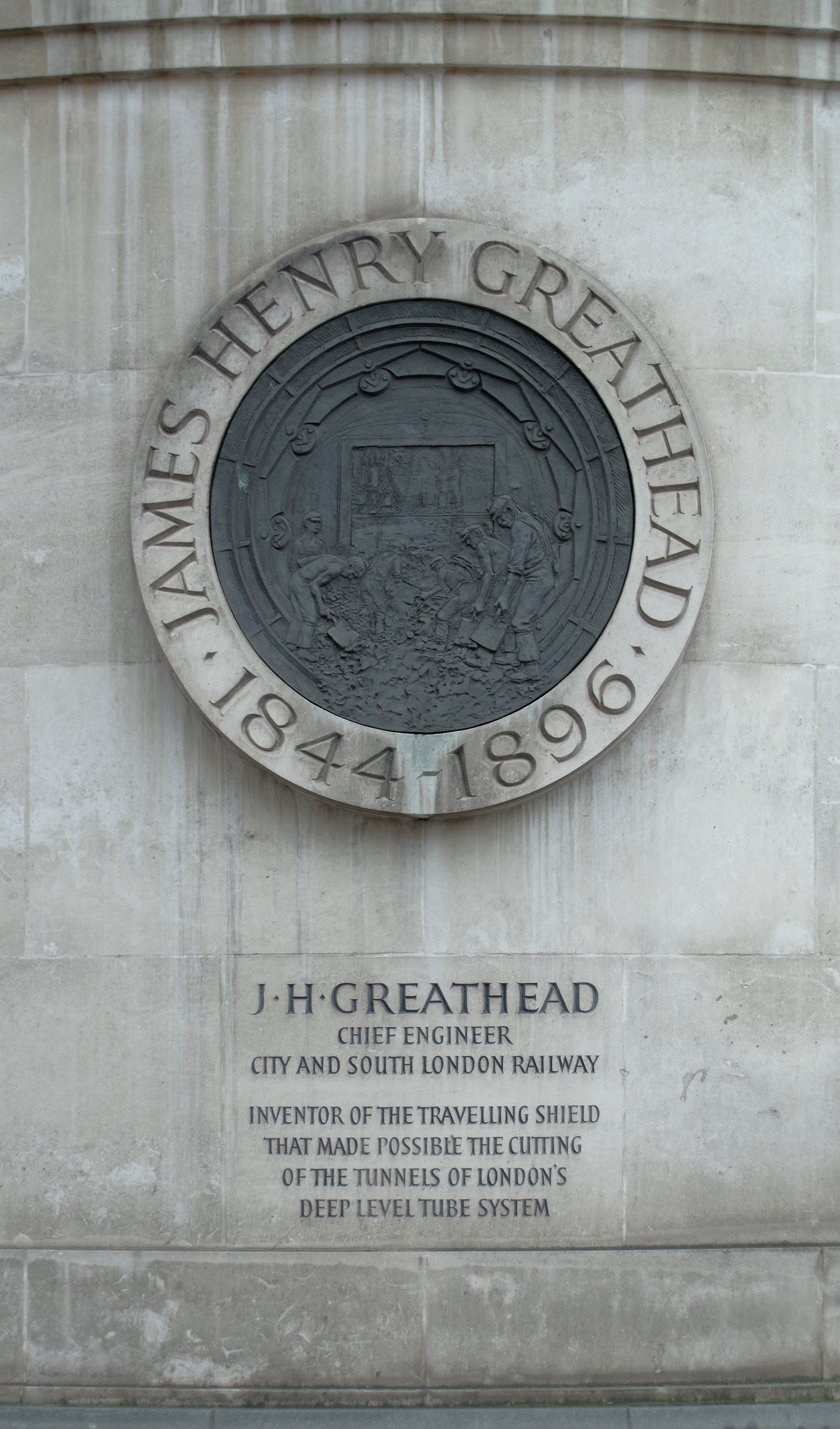
Plaque showing the tunnelling shield, with inscription

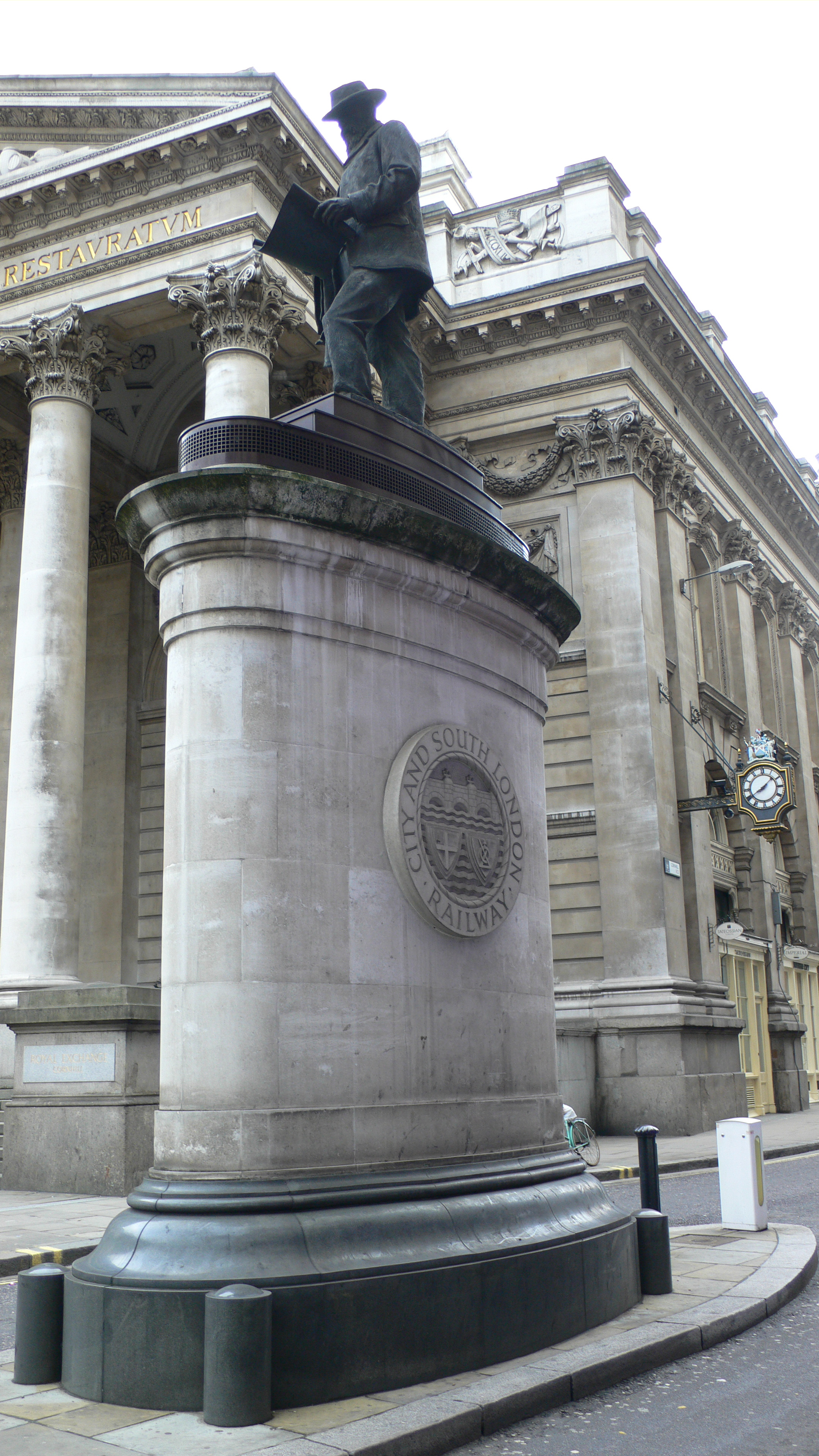
Badge of the City & South London Railway
