= 76 Club =

Nightclub in Burton upon Trent, England

The 76 Club
- Interactive map of The 76 Club
- Former names: Cambo Club
- Address: 76 High Street
- Location: Burton upon Trent, DE14 1LD, United Kingdom
- Coordinates: 52°48′21″N 01°37′39″W
- Type: Nightclub
- Event: Rock

Construction
- Opened: 1961
- Closed: 2000s

The 76 Club was a nightclub in Burton upon Trent, Staffordshire, England. During the 1970s and 1980s, the club featured appearances by well-known emerging rock bands. In 1976, the Sex Pistols recorded their live album Anarchy in the UK: Live at the 76 Club. Other bands that performed at the club include AC/DC, Dire Straits, Judas Priest, Motörhead, Skid Row, Suzi Quatro, Thin Lizzy, and Ultravox.

== History ==
76 High Street, Burton-on-Trent, began its musical life in the late 1950 when the Mocambo Snack Bar and Café opened to provide refreshment for those walking the long walk from the shopping centre to Wetmore Road bus station (and elsewhere). It soon became popular with the emerging groups of teenagers in the town.

By 1960, local entrepreneur Gordon Band ran three business in the town centre offering food and music: the Harlequin Snack Bar at 21/22 Station Street, the Mocambo Snack Bar and Café at 76 High Street, and the Cambo Club in premises behind the High Street café. On 1 December 1960 the club reopened transformed into the 76 Club, and at some time later in the High Street café became The Jolly Fryer fish and chip shop.

== Concerts (selected) ==
Date	Musician(s)	Tour	Note
1972 concerts
15 September	Skid Row	--	--
1973 concerts
26 January	Thin Lizzy	Thin Lizzy tour 1973	--
1975 concerts
29 March	Fumble	--	--
3 May	Judas Priest	--	--
1976 concerts
6 August	AC/DC	UK & Europe Summer Tour	--
24 September	Sex Pistols	--	Left in the form of album Anarchy in the UK: Live at the 76 Club
1977 concerts
20 January	Motörhead	England 1977	--
1978 concerts
23 June	Dire Straits	Dire Straits Tour	--
1979 concerts
13 April	Simple Minds	Life In A Day Tour	--
1980 concerts
20 March	The Lambrettas	--	--
6 June	Girlschool	--	--
22 August	White Spirit	--	--
5 September	Diamond Head	Sweet and Innocent Tour	--
See also
Friday Night Live Bands 1971 to 1977
Facebook "The 76 Club - Burton On Trent"

== The Revival ==
Following the success of the 76 Club 50th Anniversary Reunion at Burton upon Trent Town Hall in November 2011, the 76 Club brand 're-formed' the following January 2012, promoting local gigs through its presence on social media, principally Facebook.
