= Coopers Square =

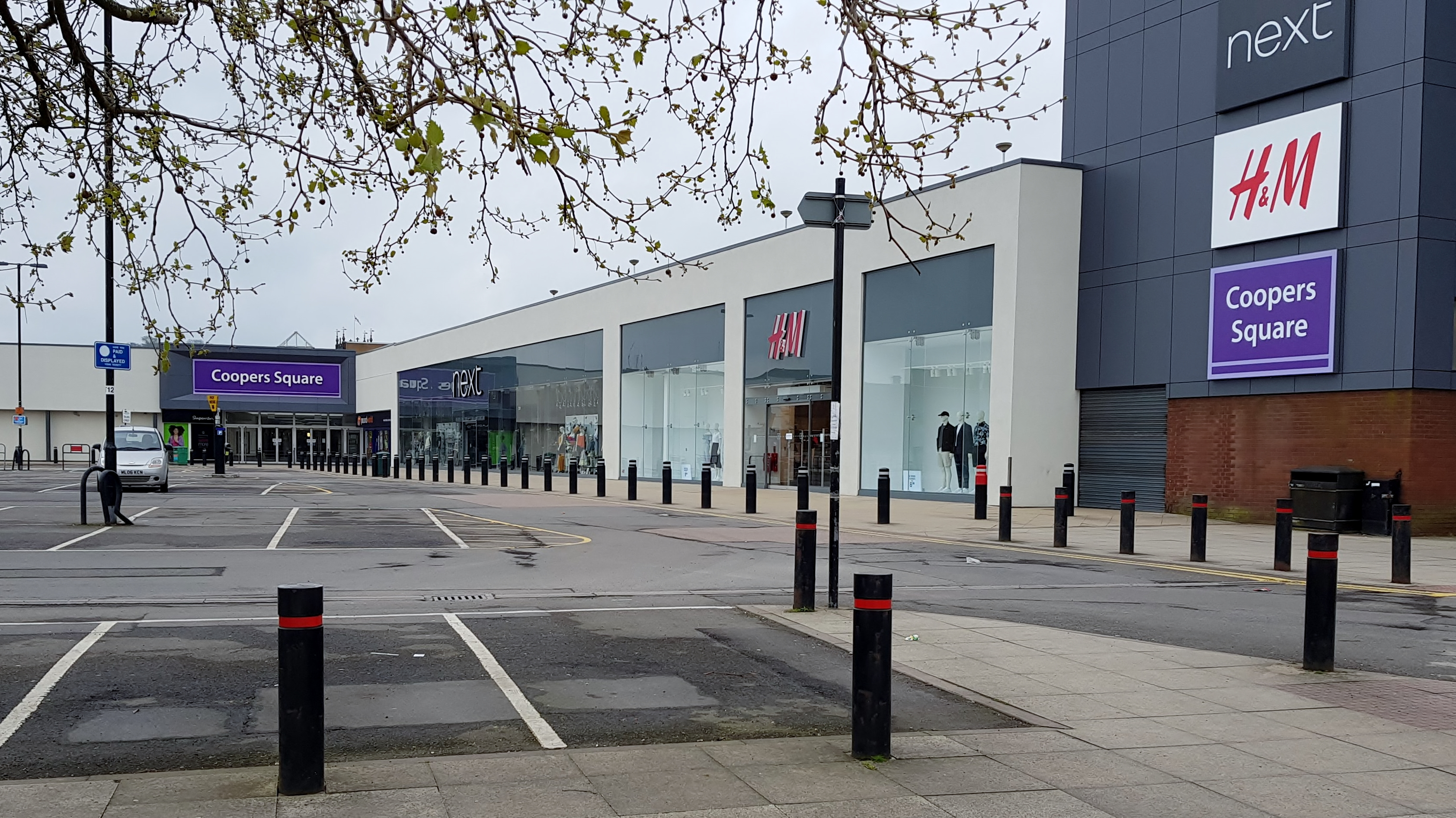
- Location: Burton upon Trent, Staffordshire, England
- Coordinates: 52°48′07″N 01°37′57″W
- Opened: 1970 (as Burton Shopping Centre)
- Developer: Grosvenor Group
- Owner: Grosvenor Group
- Num. of stores: 70
- Num. of anchor tenants: 2 (Primark, Marks and Spencer)
- Floor area: 385,000 sq ft (35,800 m^{2})
- Floors: 2
- Parking: 800 spaces
- Website: www.cooperssquare.co.uk

Coopers Square (originally called Burton Shopping Centre) is an indoor shopping centre located in Burton-upon-Trent, Staffordshire, England. It is owned by the Grosvenor Group. The total retail area for the shopping centre is 35,766 m^{2} (384,980 sq ft). The shopping centre has 800 car parking spaces, with a ground car park as well as a rooftop car park.

== History ==
The site was opened in 1970 by HRH Princess Alexandra as Burton Shopping Centre. The centre underwent a large refurbishment which was completed in 1994, which included the addition of a roof on the centre and a change of name to Coopers Square Shopping Centre.

Prior to the 1994 redevelopment of Coopers Square, Dame Paulet Walk was formerly known as 'Fennel Walk'. Dame Paulet's Almshouses occupied the site where Primark now stands; the original doorway is installed into the side of the building. Also, The Burton Cooper statue stood in the entrance of Saint Modwens Walk on High Street and the rubbish bins resembled beer casks.

In 1996 Sainsbury's moved to a new unit that had been built across the road. The former unit was split up and became a BHS (closed in 2016), JJB Sports, and the now defunct retailer, Au Naturale. The former BHS store was redeveloped as a new Next at Home store, which opened in October 2017.

== Malls ==
Coopers Square consists of five 'malls'. These are:

- Underhill Walk
- Swan Walk
- St Modwens Walk
- Dame Paulet Walk
- Cooper's Square

== Stores ==
Below is a partial list of stores in the centre as of July 2020:

- Superdrug
- WH Smith
- Card Factory
- Clarks
- Early Learning Centre
- EE
- GAME
- Boots
- Marks & Spencer
- The Carphone Warehouse
- Next at Home
- Primark
- JD Sports
- Greggs
- Thorntons
- H&M
- Waterstones
- New Look
- River Island
- Vodafone
- O2 Store
- Three
- Vision Express
- Timpson
- Smiggle
- Peacocks
- Pandora
- Holland & Barrett

== Facilities ==
The centre's facilities include toilets and a cafe called Ronnie's Patisserie, which replaced Patisserie Valerie when it closed after the company went into administration in 2019.
