= O2 Store =

Chain of retail stores operated by Telefónica Europe

The O2 Store is a chain of retail stores operated by Telefónica Europe, specializing in mobile phones. As of January 2014, O2 has opened over 450 stores in the United Kingdom.

== Design and innovation ==
=== Microsoft Surface ===
Aside from general information, mobile phones are the central motive for visiting an O2 store and this is where the Microsoft Surface Table is being implemented in a selection of stores. Customers can interactively choose from a selection of mobile phones. Data is displayed directly from the existing O2 backend systems and thus are always up to date. Using the touch-sensitive surface, users can filter for desired features, compare handsets and view them from various angles more easily.

== Locations ==
–The first O2 Franchise Store opened in Rotherham, South Yorkshire on 24 November 2005.

Country	First store opened	Total open stores
United Kingdom	24 November 2005	>450
Germany		500
Netherlands		
Czech Republic		
Slovakia		

== See also ==
- O2 (Ireland)
- Telefónica Czech Republic
- Telefónica Slovakia
