= National Brewery Centre =

Tourist attraction in Burton upon Trent, England

Coordinates: 52.8074°N 1.6323°W

Logo of the National Brewery Centre

The National Brewery Centre (formerly the Bass Museum of Brewing and later the Coors Visitor Center) was a museum and tourist attraction adjacent to the Bass Brewery in Burton upon Trent, Staffordshire, England. The centre celebrated the brewing heritage of Burton and featured exhibits showcasing the history of brewing techniques. The centre also housed a bar and cafe, a history of the town, a collection of historic vehicles, a working steam engine, a micro brewery and a shire horse collection.

== Closure, reopening and second closure ==
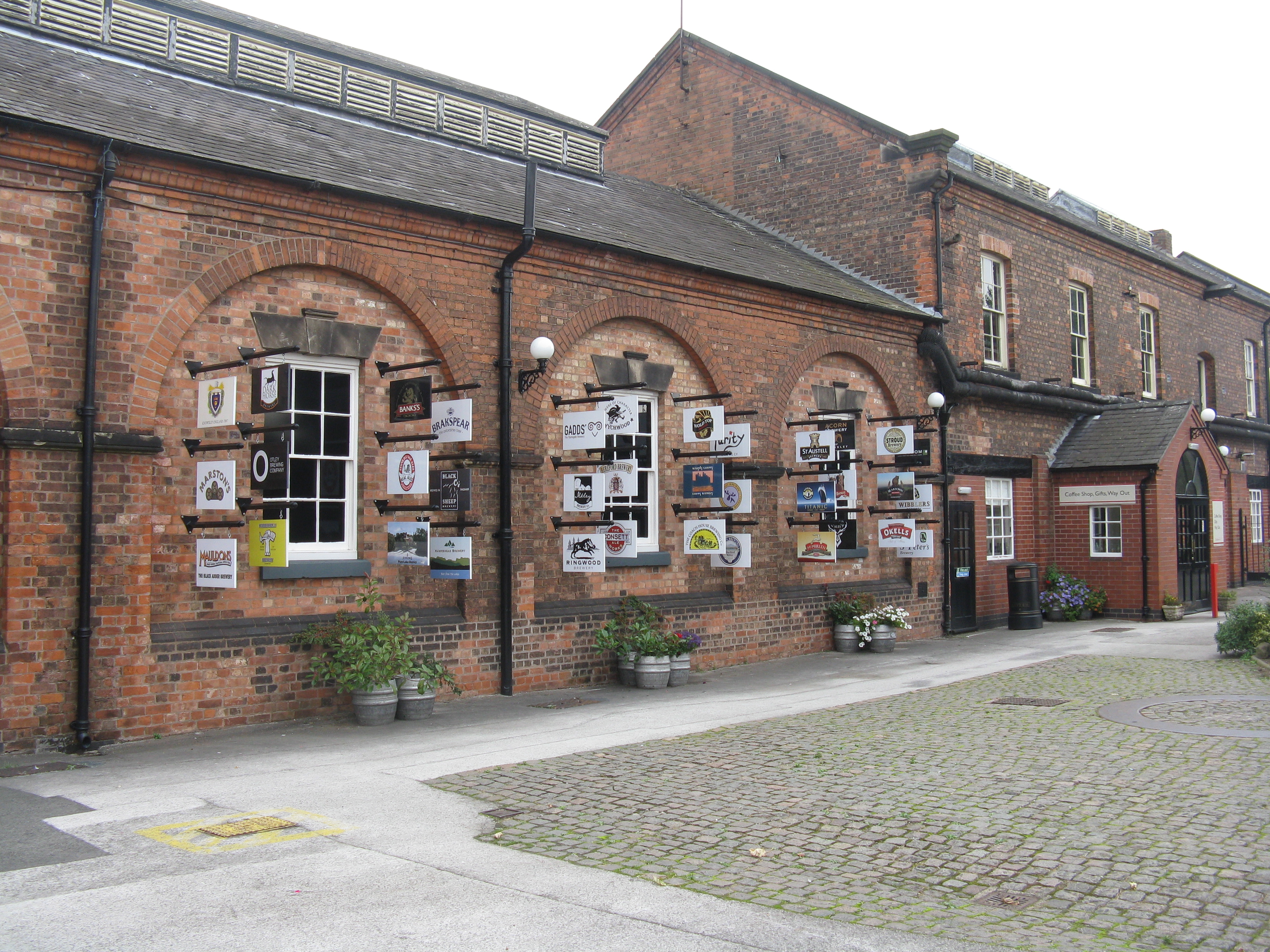
The National Brewery Centre

On 18 March 2008, Coors announced that it was to close the Visitor Centre which the company was subsidising at a cost of £1 million a year. The museum closed on 30 June 2008 but the attractions were mothballed in the hope that the museum could be reopened at a later date. A steering group was established to investigate reopening the museum. The museum reopened as the National Brewery Centre on 1 May 2010 and was officially reopened by The Princess Royal on 21 September 2010.

The Centre finally closed on 31 October 2022 after Coors decided to move its UK headquarters to the site. This was prompted by East Staffordshire Borough Council who gambled on winning money to secure Bass House in Burton to house a new museum. However, this money, part of the Government's levelling up funding, was not forthcoming. The exhibits are due to be put into storage.

== Future plans ==
The centre's collection will be housed on the ground floor of Bass House on Burton High Street if funding is secured. The building is owned by East Staffordshire Borough Council.
