= Burton upon Trent =

Town in Staffordshire, England

Coordinates: 52°48′07″N 01°38′12″W

Burton upon Trent: Burton-on-Trent
- Town
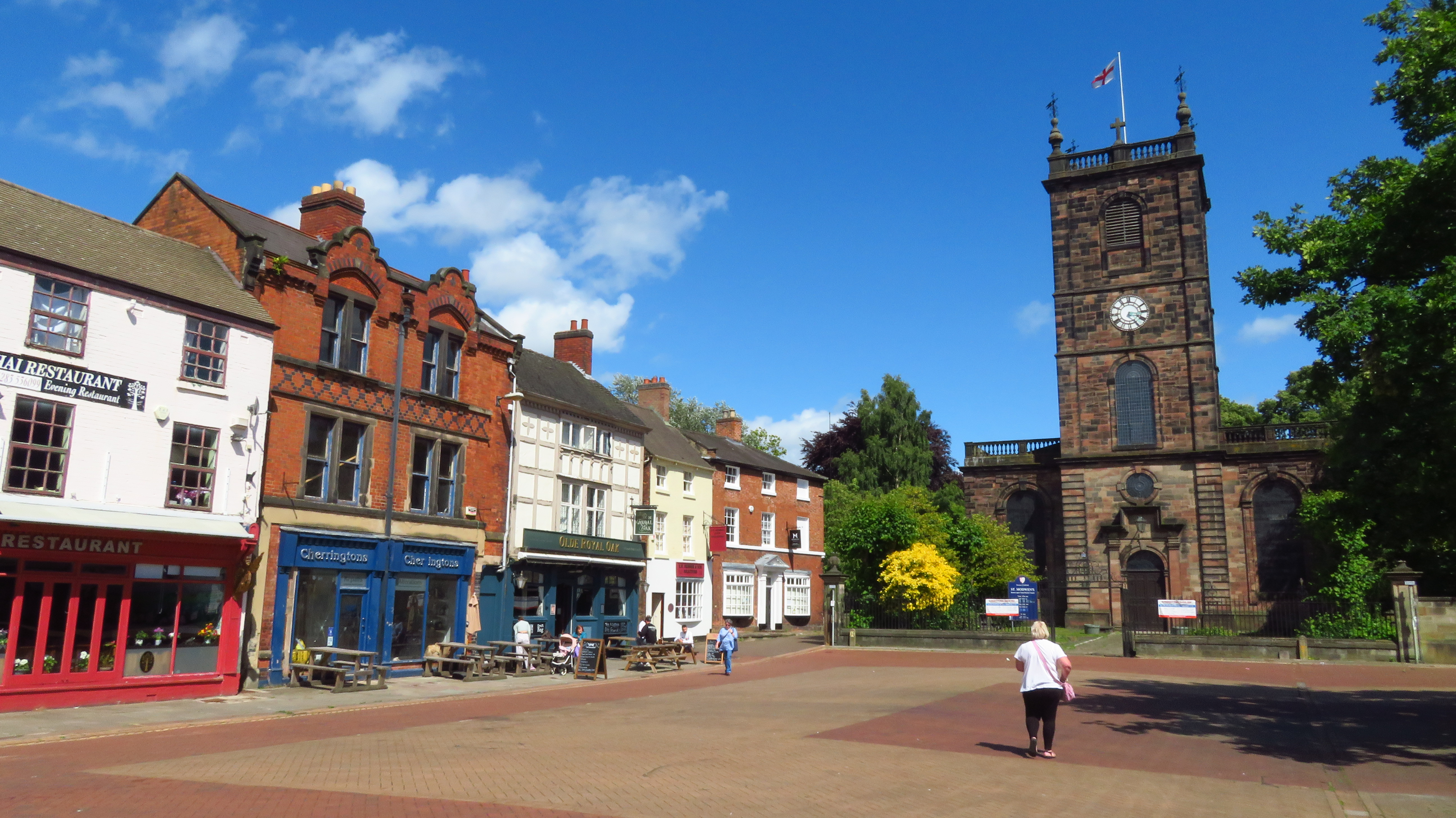
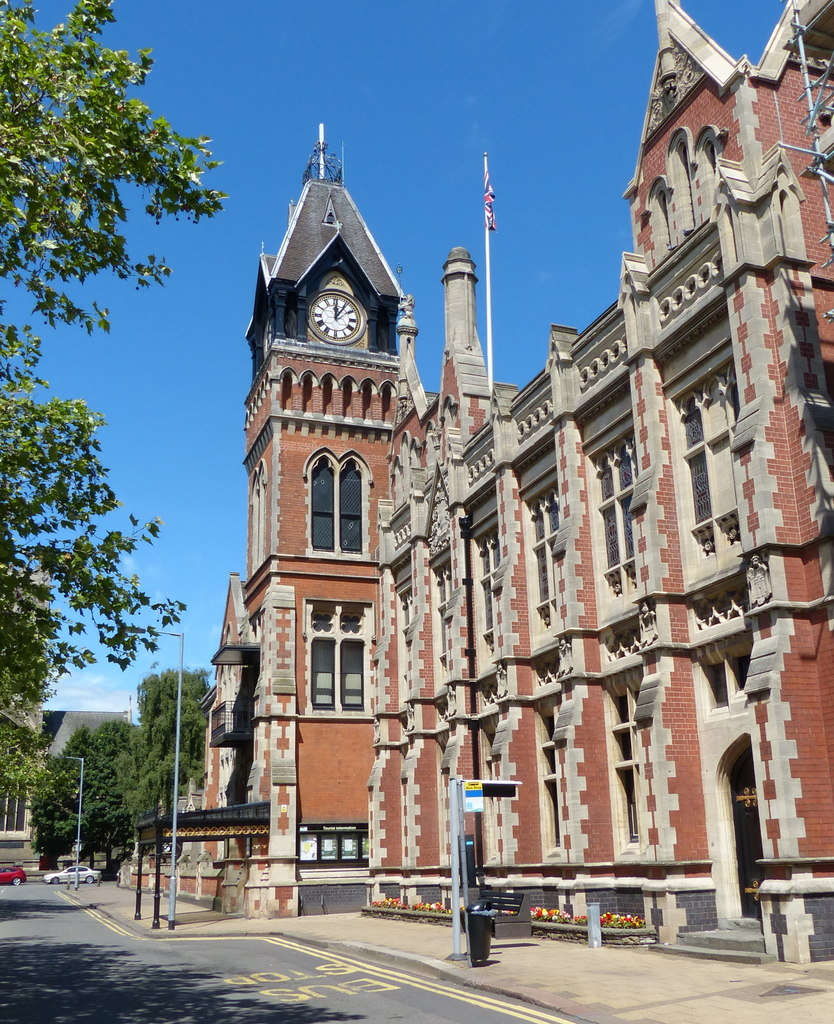
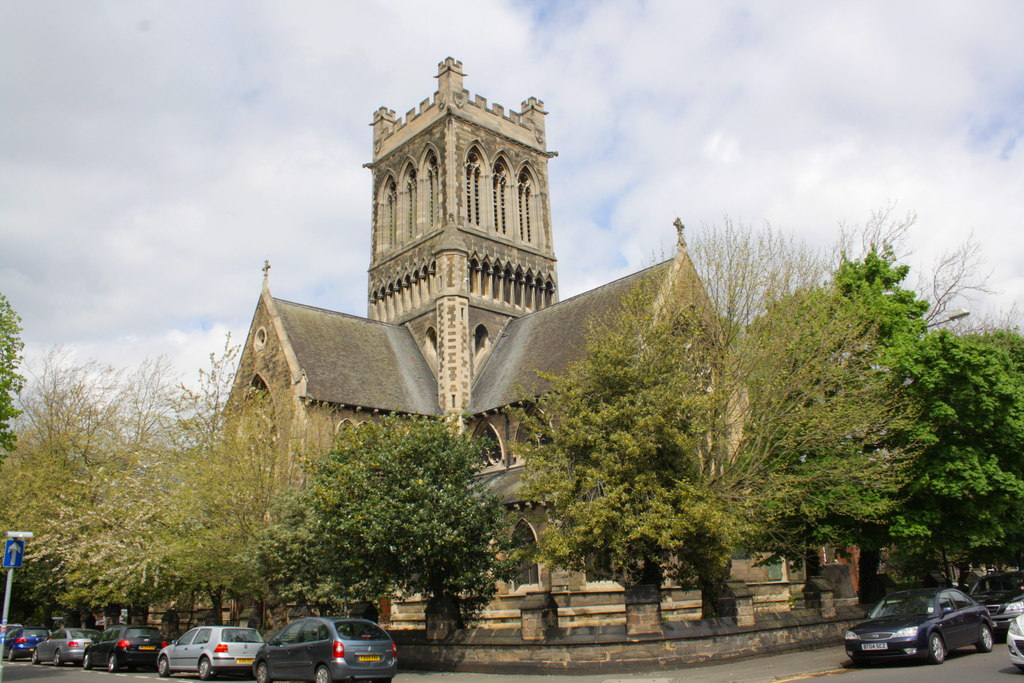
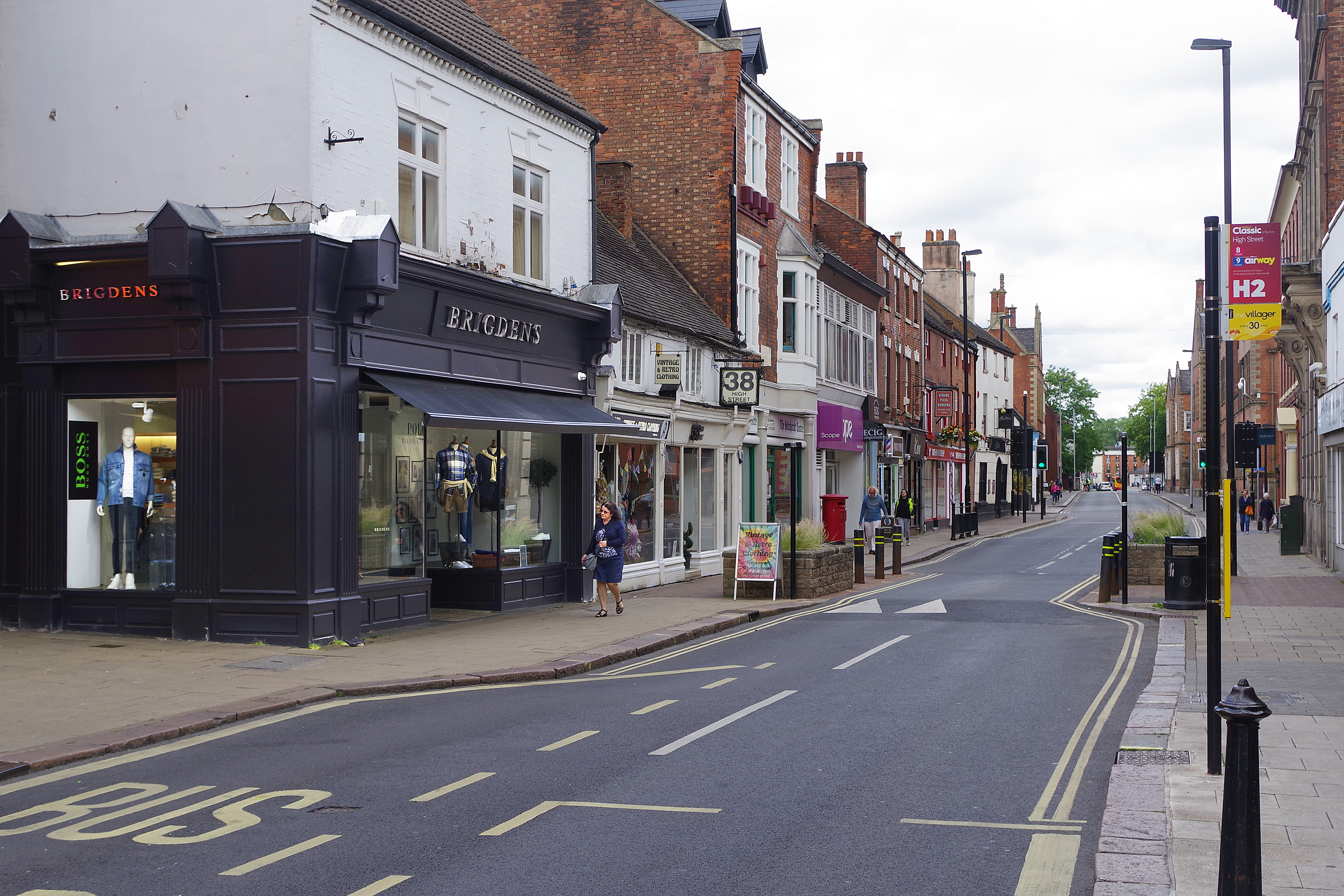
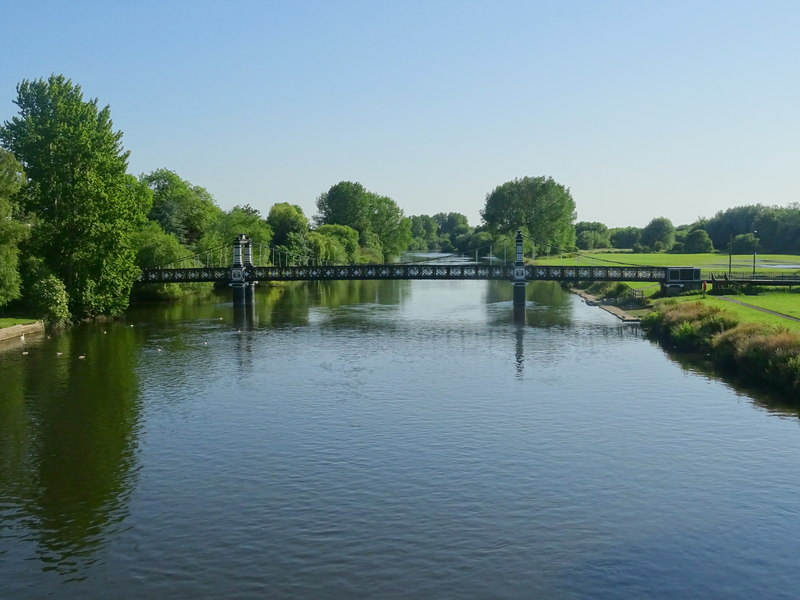
- Market Place Town Hall St Paul's Church High Street Ferry Bridge

- Location within Staffordshire
- Population: 76,270 (2021 census)
- OS grid reference: SK245225
- District: East Staffordshire
- Shire county: Staffordshire
- Region: West Midlands
- Country: England
- Sovereign state: United Kingdom
- Areas of the town (2011 census BUASD): List: Branston; Horninglow; Stapenhill; Stretton; Winshill
- Post town: Burton-on-Trent
- Postcode district: DE13-DE15
- Dialling code: 01283
- Police: Staffordshire
- Fire: Staffordshire
- Ambulance: West Midlands
- UK Parliament: Burton and Uttoxeter

Burton upon Trent, also known as Burton-on-Trent or simply Burton, is a market town in the borough of East Staffordshire in the county of Staffordshire, England, close to the border with Derbyshire. At the 2021 census, it had a population of 76,270. The demonym for residents of the town is Burtonian. Burton is located on the River Trent 11 miles (18 km) south-west of Derby and 20 miles (32 km) south of the Peak District National Park.

Burton is known for its brewing. The town grew up around Burton Abbey. Burton Bridge was also the site of two battles, in 1322, when Edward II defeated the rebel Earl of Lancaster and in 1643 when royalists captured the town during the First English Civil War. William Lord Paget and his descendants were responsible for extending the manor house within the abbey grounds and facilitating the extension of the River Trent Navigation to Burton. Burton grew into a busy market town by the early modern period.

The town is served by Burton-on-Trent railway station. The town was also the start and terminus of the now defunct South Staffordshire Line which linked it to Lichfield, Walsall, Dudley and Stourbridge.

== Toponymy ==
The name Burton upon Trent derives from the meaning "a settlement at a fortified place" along the River Trent and dates from the 8th century.

According to the town's charter the official name of the town is Burton upon Trent. However, the form 'Burton-on-Trent' is used for the post town by Royal Mail and for the town's railway station.

== History ==
Rykneld Street, a Roman road, ran north-east through what later became the parish of Burton, linking settlements at Letocetum (Wall), near Lichfield and Derventio (Little Chester) near Derby.

Between 666 and 669 Wilfrid, the pro-Roman bishop of York, exercised episcopal functions in Mercia, whose Christian king, Wulfhere, gave him land in various places, on which he established monasteries. Burton was almost certainly one of the sites: the name Andresey given to an island in the river Trent near the parish church means "Andrew's isle" and refers to a church there dedicated to St Andrew. The island is associated with the legend of St Modwen or Modwenna, an Irish abbess. It is likely that any surviving religious house would have been destroyed during the Danish incursion into the area in 874. Place names indicate Scandinavian influence, and several personal names of Scandinavian origin were still used in the area in the early 12th century. In 1003 a Benedictine abbey was established on a new site on the west bank of the Trent at Burton by Wulfric Spott, a thegn. He is known to have been buried in the abbey cloister in 1010, alongside his wife.

Burton Abbey was mentioned in the Domesday Book of 1086, where it was said to control lands in Appleby Magna in Leicestershire, and Mickleover, Winshill, Stapenhill, Coton in the Elms, Ca(u)ldwell (in Stapenhill Parish) and Ticknall, all then in Derbyshire. The monastery was the most important in Staffordshire and by the 1530s had the highest revenue. It is known that there were frequent Royal visits to the abbey, including those by William I, Henry II and Edward I. In the 12th and 13th centuries, streets were laid out off the west side of High Street, the earliest being New Street, which stretched from the abbey gates towards the line of Ryknild Street. Horninglow Street at the north end of High Street was part of a major east–west route using the bridge over the river.

A royal charter was granted on 12 April 1200 by King John to the Abbot to hold a market in Burton every Thursday. This charter was later renewed by King Henry III and King Edward IV. There were four annual fairs for trade in horses, cattle and produce: on Candlemas Day, 5 April, Holy Thursday, and 29 October (the feast of St Modwen) although as in other British towns this practice has died out.

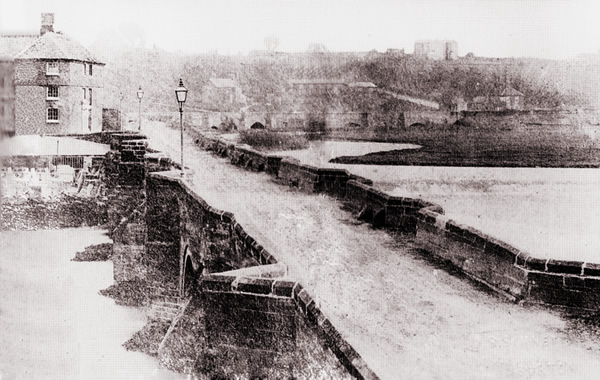
An early photograph of the 36-arch medieval Burton bridge, an important crossing point

While Burton's great bridge over the Trent was in poor repair by the early 16th century, it served as "a comen passage to and fro many countries to the grett releff and comfort of travellyng people", according to the abbot. The bridge was the site of two battles, first in 1322 when Edward II defeated the rebel Earl of Lancaster and also in 1643 when the Royalists captured the town during the First English Civil War.

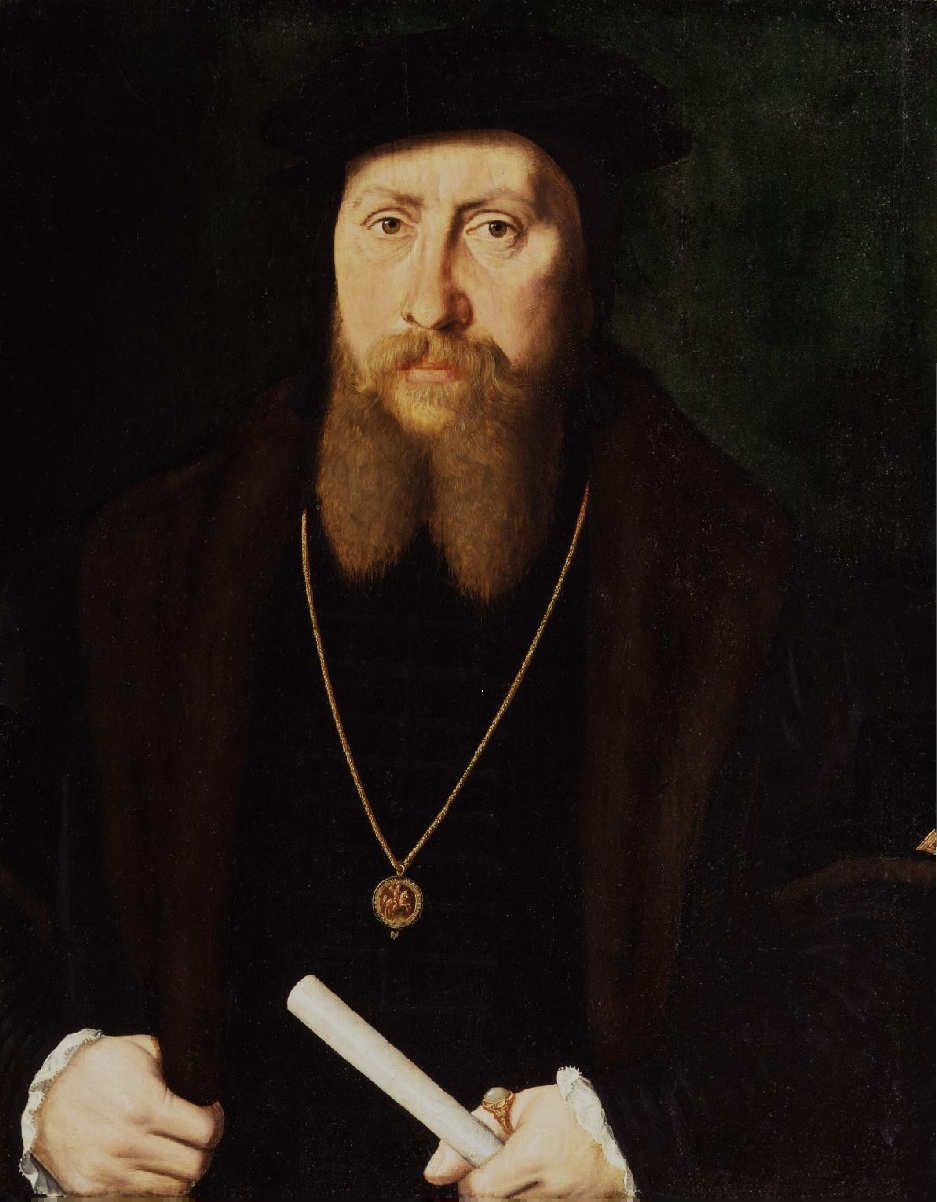
Sir William Paget, who was granted the lands at Burton Abbey in 1546 by Henry VIII and expanded the manor house

Under Henry VIII the abbey was dissolved in 1539, to be refounded in 1541 as a collegiate church for a dean (who had been the last abbot) and four prebendaries. It was again dissolved in 1545 and granted to Sir William Paget. Paget began planning to expand the manor house within the abbey precincts, known to have existed since at least 1514, into a grand mansion. To provide the materials for this project, the old abbey buildings were to be cannibalised. There were major alterations to the house over the next three centuries. Sir William died in 1563.

In 1585 it was suggested that Mary, Queen of Scots might stay at Burton while Tutbury Castle was cleaned, but it was said that it was "a ruinous house, the buildings scattered and adjoining a very poor town, full of bad neighbours". The Paget family was implicated in Catholic plots against Queen Elizabeth I, the manor house along with most of the family estates were confiscated, with the manor house leased to Richard Almond in 1612. Parts of the abbey church may have been retained for parish use, however these were demolished and replaced by a new church in 1719–1726. Some fragments remain of the chapter house nearby, but little of the rest remains. Two buildings were converted to residential use—a part known as the manor house and the former infirmary. The infirmary became known as The Abbey and is now an inn.

=== Canals and breweries ===
The Paget family's lands and title were restored to them by James I in 1604 and they owned considerable estates around Burton for over 150 years. In 1699, William Lord Paget obtained an Act of Parliament to extend navigation on the River Trent from Nottingham up to Burton, but nothing was immediately done. In 1711 Lord Paget leased his rights to George Hayne, who in 1712 opened the River Trent Navigation and constructed a wharf and other buildings in the precinct of the old abbey. This led to the development of Burton as the major town for brewing and exporting beer, as it allowed Burton beer to be shipped to Hull, and on to the Baltic Sea and Prussia, as well as to London, where it was being sold in 1712. A number of breweries opened in the second half of the 18th century. The Napoleonic blockade badly affected overseas trade, leading to some consolidation and a redirection of the trade to London and Lancashire via canals. When Burton brewers succeeded in replicating the pale ale produced in London, the advantage of the water's qualities, in a process named Burtonisation allowed the development of the trade of Burton India Pale Ale (an ale specially brewed to keep during the long sea voyage to India). New rail links to Liverpool enabled brewers to export their beer throughout the British Empire.

Burton came to dominate the brewing trade, and at its height one quarter of all beer sold in Britain was produced here. In the second half of the 19th century, there was a growth in native breweries, supplemented by outside brewing companies moving into the town, so that over 30 breweries were recorded in 1880. However at the beginning of the 20th century there was a slump in beer sales, causing many breweries to fail; the industry suffered from the Liberal government's anti-drinking attitudes. This time no new markets were found and so the number of breweries shrank by closure and consolidation from 20 in 1900 to 8 in 1928. After further mergers and buy-outs, just three main breweries remained by 1980: Bass, Ind Coope and Marston's.

Burton was home to the Peel family, who played a significant role in the Industrial Revolution. The family home is still visible in the town as Peel House on Lichfield Street. Her Majesty Queen Elizabeth II visited the town on 3 July 2002 during her Golden Jubilee celebrations.

== Governance ==
There are three tiers of local government covering Burton, at county, district and parish level: Staffordshire County Council, East Staffordshire Borough Council, and a number of parish councils covering different parts of the urban area. There is a parish called Burton which just covers the central part of the town.

Burton is the administrative centre for the borough of East Staffordshire and forms part of the Burton and Uttoxeter constituency. The local Member of Parliament (MP) is the Labour Party's Jacob Collier, who has represented the constituency since the 2024 general election, winning the seat from Kate Kniveton of the Conservative Party.

=== Administrative history ===
Burton upon Trent was an ancient parish, which historically straddled the boundary between Staffordshire and Derbyshire. The parish was divided into five townships, being Winshill in Derbyshire, and Branston, Horninglow, Stretton and a Burton upon Trent township (covering the central part of the parish) in Staffordshire. The rural parts of the Burton township became a separate township called Burton Extra in the sixteenth century. Such townships were all reclassified as civil parishes in 1866.

Burton had been an ancient borough from the twelfth century, giving some degree of self-government for the town, but by the seventeenth century its borough corporation had ceased to operate and its borough status lapsed, with the town being administered by the parish vestry and manorial courts instead. More urban forms of local government returned to the town in 1779 when a body of improvement commissioners was established, initially just covering the Burton township. Their district was extended in 1853 to take in parts of the townships of Burton Extra and Horninglow, and again in 1878 to take in the rest of Burton Extra, more of Horninglow (including the village), parts of Branston and Winshill, and part of the neighbouring Derbyshire parish of Stapenhill.

Later in 1878 the improvement commissioners' district was incorporated as a municipal borough called Burton upon Trent. When elected county councils were created in 1889 boroughs were no longer allowed to straddle county boundaries, and so the Derbyshire parts of the borough (Stapenhill and Winshill) were transferred to Staffordshire. Six years later the Local Government Act 1894 said that parishes could no longer straddle borough boundaries, and so the parts of Stapenhill parish outside the borough were transferred to the neighbouring parishes of Bretby and Drakelow, the rural parts of Winshill went to Newton Solney, the rural part of Horninglow became a new parish called Outwoods and the parts of Branston inside the borough were transferred to Burton Extra. The five urban parishes inside the borough were then Burton upon Trent, Burton Extra, Horninglow, Stapenhill and Winshill, which were amalgamated into a single Burton upon Trent parish in 1904.

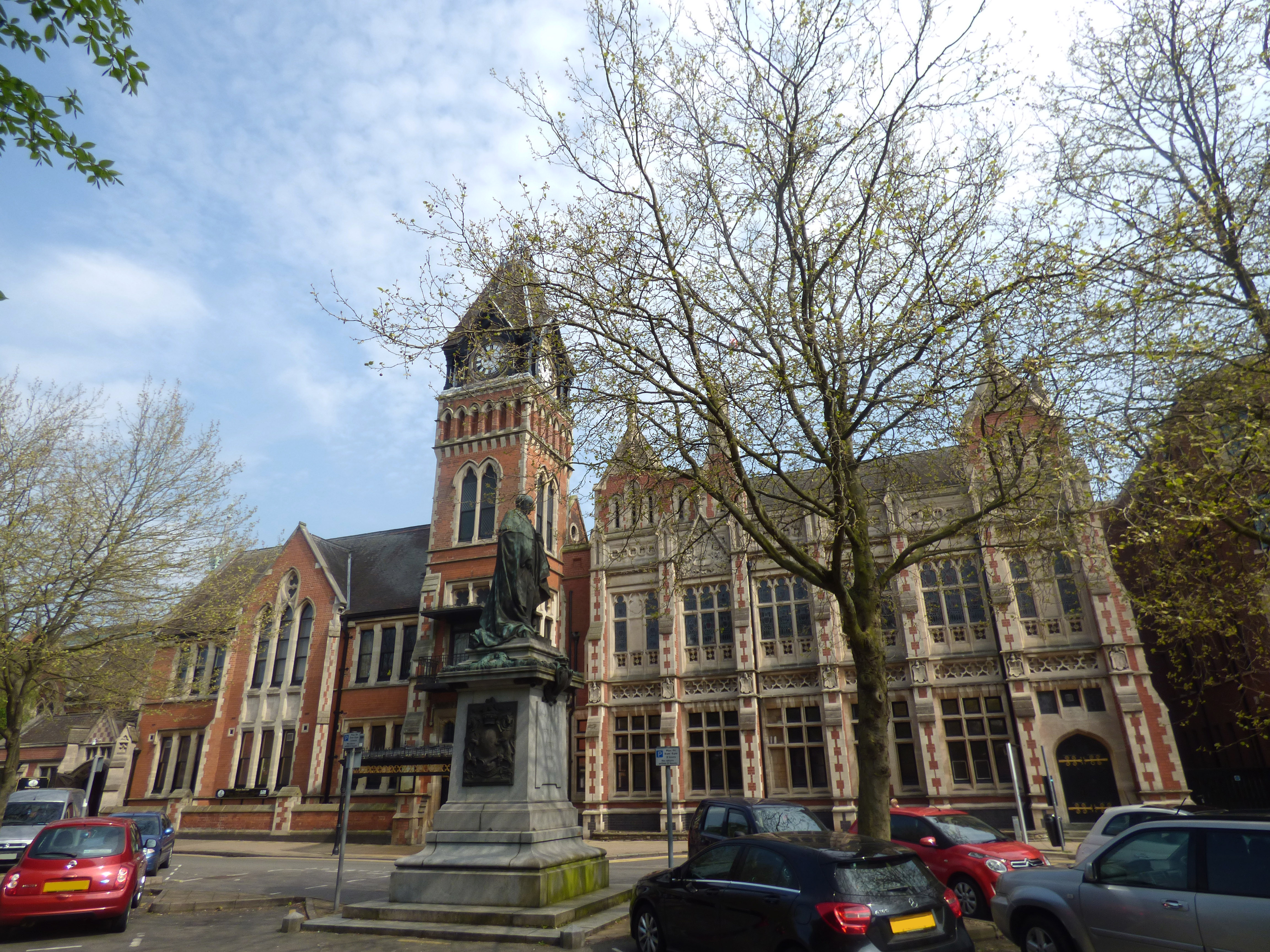
Burton upon Trent Town Hall

In 1891 the council was given the former St Paul's Institute and Liberal Club on King Edward Place, which had been built in 1878. They substantially extended the building to serve as their headquarters, renaming it Town Hall.

Burton was elevated to become a county borough in 1901, making it independent from Staffordshire County Council, having reached the 50,000 population required. It never substantially exceeded the population of 50,000, and with a population of 50,201 in the 1971 census it was the second smallest county borough in England after Canterbury. The Local Government Commission for England recommended in the 1960s that it be demoted to a non-county borough within Staffordshire, but this was not implemented. Under the Local Government Act 1972, the town became an unparished area in the new district of East Staffordshire on 1 April 1974.

The town became entirely parished on 1 April 2003, when the parishes of Anglesey, Brizlincote, Burton, Horninglow and Eton, Shobnall, Stapenhill, and Winshill were created. Burton parish itself only covers the town centre, with the other parishes covering various suburbs. The urban area now also extends into the adjoining parishes of Branston, Outwoods and Stretton, which had all been outside the pre-1974 county borough.

Under current local government reorganisation plans, the county council and district council will be abolished and merged into a new South and Mid Staffordshire unitary authority in 2028.

== Geography ==
Burton is about 109 miles (175 km) north west of London, about 30 miles (48 km) north east of Birmingham, the UK's second largest city and about 23 miles east of the county town Stafford. It is at the easternmost border of the county of Staffordshire with Derbyshire, its suburbs and the course of the River Trent forming part of the county boundary. It is also near the south-eastern terminus of the Trent and Mersey Canal. Burton lies within the northern boundary of the National Forest. The town centre is on the western bank of the River Trent in a valley bottom; its average elevation is about 50 metres above sea level; the village of Winshill and the suburb of Stapenhill rise to 130 m and 100 m respectively.

Burton became a centre for the brewing industry due in part to the quality of the local water, which contains a high proportion of dissolved salts, predominantly caused by the gypsum in the surrounding hills. This allowed a greater proportion of hops, a natural preservative, to be included in the beer, thereby allowing the beer to be shipped further afield. Much of the open land within and around the town is protected from chemical treatment to help preserve this water quality.

=== Region ===
There is some confusion as to whether Burton is in the West Midlands or the East Midlands, even though the entire urban centre is southwest of the River Dove, which forms the Derbyshire/Staffordshire boundary. Being in Staffordshire, the town officially lies within the West Midlands region. Several factors contribute to the ambiguity of the town's status. The local vernacular shares more similarities with East Midlands English than West Midlands English; the town was formerly within the East Midlands Utility (electricity/gas) areas; has Derby postcodes (DE13-DE15) and is served by BBC Radio Derby based in Derby. However, it is served by the BBC Midlands (West Midlands) region based in Birmingham and before consolidation exercises formed part of the ITV Central (West) region, again based in Birmingham.

=== Green belt ===
The suburbs of Winshill, Brizlincote and Stapenhill to the southeast of the town lie along a green-belt area, in place to stop uncontrolled development which could cause Burton to, in time, merge with neighbouring Swadlincote. The majority of this green belt lies in Derbyshire, with small tracts within Staffordshire.

== Demography ==
The town had an estimated population of 43,784 in the 2001 census. Stapenhill and Winshill were treated separately and together had a further population of 21,985 according to this source. According to the 2001 census,

In the 2021 census, the population of Burton was recorded at 76,270.

The town's ethnicity composition was recorded as:

- White - 60,895 (79.9%)
- Asian - 10,883 (14.3%)
- Mixed Race - 2,169 (2.8%)
- Black - 1,169 (1.5%)
- Other - 1,164 (1.3%)

The town's religious composition was recorded as:

- Christians - 34,140 (47.5%)
- Irreligious - 26,275 (36.5%)
- Muslims - 10,363 (14.4%)
- Other - 347 (0.5%)
- Hindus - 293 (0.4%)
- Sikhs - 268 (0.4%)
- Buddhists - 195 (0.3%)
- Jews - 13 (0.1%)

== Economy ==
=== Brewing ===
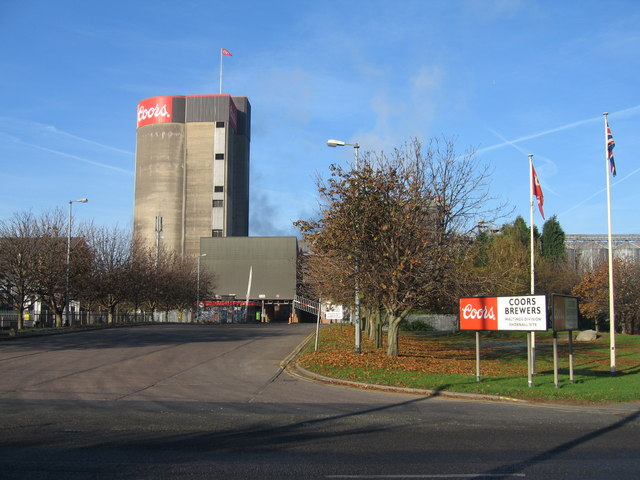
Maltings built by the Bass Brewery, now part of Coors Brewers on Wellington Road

For centuries brewing was Burton's major trade, and it is still an important part of its economy. The town is currently home to eight breweries.

Coors Brewers Ltd produces Carling and Worthington Bitter, and was known as Bass Brewers Ltd until it was acquired by the American brewers Molson Coors Brewing Company in the late 1990s.

Marston's Brewery produces its own brands, draught Marston's Pedigree, draught Hobgoblin and also draught Bass under licence from InBev. Formerly Marston's, Thompson and Evershed plc, it was bought by Wolverhampton & Dudley Breweries and now renamed Marstons plc.

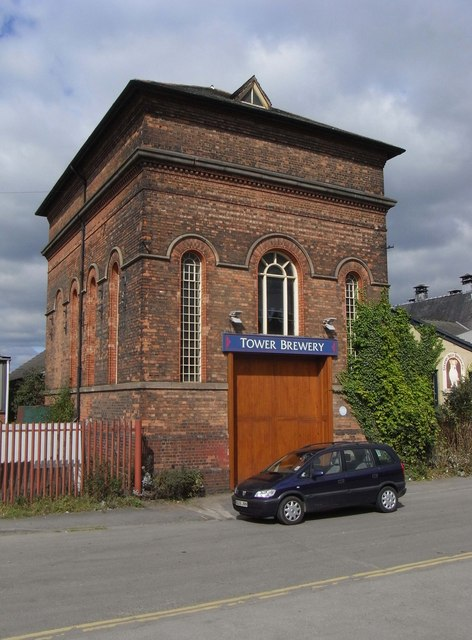
Tower Brewery, a microbrewery based in the old Salts Water Tower of Walsitch Maltings

Burton Bridge Brewery is based in Bridge Street, with six pubs in and around Burton. It produces a number of traditional beers including Bridge Bitter, Stairway to Heaven, Damson Porter and Golden Delicious. Tower Brewery is a microbrewery off Wharf Road. Old Cottage Brewery is based in Hawkins Lane. Its beers include Oak Ale and Halcyon Daze. Black Hole Brewery is based at the Imex Centre. Gates Brewery microbrewery is in Reservoir Road.

Burton is also the corporate headquarters of the pub operators Punch Taverns plc and Spirit Pub Company which was bought by Greene King so doesn't have a headquarters there anymore, which were spun out of Bass in 1997. In addition, the White Shield microbrewery remains open alongside the former National Brewery Centre (at times, the Bass Museum of Brewing).

A by-product of the brewing industry is the Marmite factory in the town. The original Marmite factory (now demolished) was at the corner of Cross Street and Duke Street before they moved to the current factory on Wellington Road in the 1960s. The production of Marmite has in turn generated the production of Bovril. Both are owned by multinational company Unilever.

Burton is also home to CAMRA's National Breweriana Auction that takes place each October in the Town Hall.

=== Manufacturing ===
Eatough's (sometimes Etough's) was a shoemaking firm from Leicestershire that opened a factory in Burton Road, Branston in 1920. It was the first British shoe factory to introduce music in the workplace (1936), and washable children's sandals ('Plastisha' 1957), but it closed in 1989 as a result of competition from cheap imports.

Briggs of Burton (formerly S. Briggs & Co.) is a Burton-based brewery and process engineering company established in 1732 by Samuel Briggs. Famous for its manufacturing innovation and craftsmanship across the world, Briggs moved from its works in New Street to Derby Street having taken over its rival Robert Morton DG in 1988. The former site is now occupied by the Octagon Shopping Centre.

Established in 1740, Thornewill and Warham was a metal hardware and industrial metalwork manufacturer, later an engineering company that became a notable producer of steam engines and railway locomotives. It also constructed two footbridges across the River Trent in Burton. It too was acquired by S. Briggs & Co, in 1929.

=== Retail ===
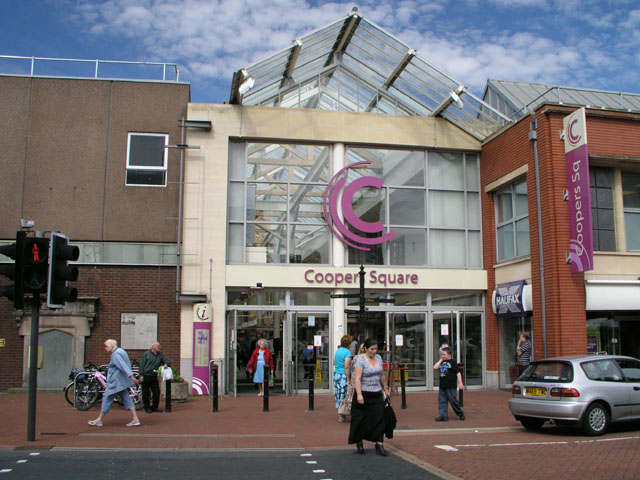
Entrance to Coopers Square shopping centre

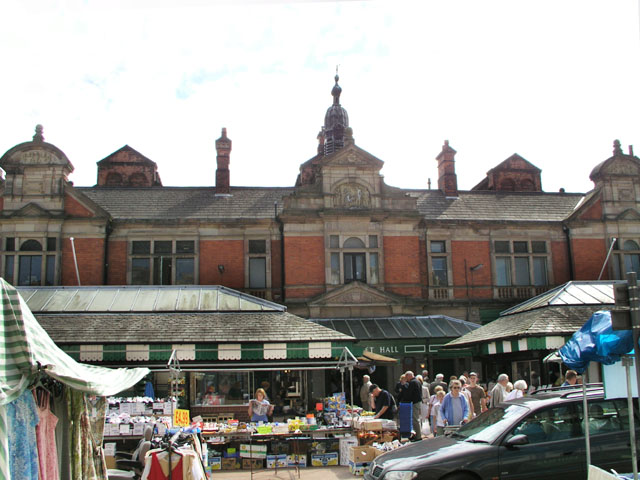
Burton Market Hall on market day

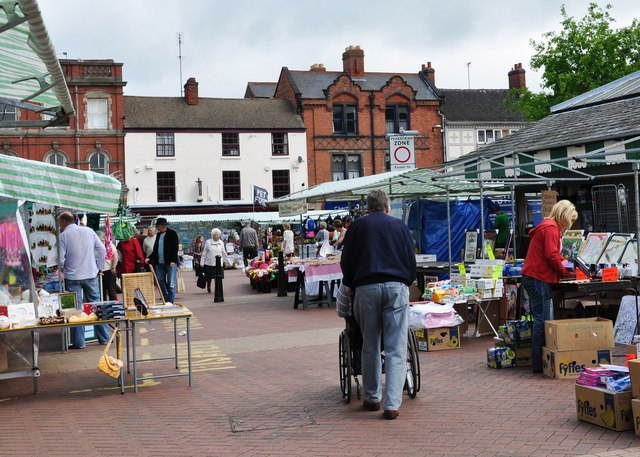
The market square

A market has been held on Thursdays in Burton since a charter was granted to the abbot by King John on 12 April 1200. Burton today has an indoor and an outdoor market, which are owned by East Staffordshire Borough Council. In 2011 the council contracted out responsibility for market stall rentals to private letting agency Quarterbridge. The Market Hall opens from Tuesday to Saturday. It was built to replace on older structure in 1883 from designs by Dixon & Moxon of Barnsley, with a trussed roof with cast iron support pillars. A fish market was added to the hall in 1925. The outdoor market is held every Thursday, Friday and Saturday from 8.30am until 4pm.

The Coopers Square shopping centre is the principal shopping area, opened in 1970 by the Princess Alexandra but since considerably upgraded with a roof being added in the mid-1990s. The older Riverside Shopping Centre (known as Bargates) is now demolished.

An additional shopping centre is The Octagon Shopping Centre on New Street, constructed in the mid-1980s. There is another, much smaller shopping centre, Burton Place Shopping Centre, which was built in 1986 and originally known as Worthington Walk. Also located in the town centre is Middleway Retail Park, which includes a Cineworld multiplex cinema, Mecca Bingo, Matalan and restaurants, including Bella Italia and Nando's.

In 2005 a report by the New Economics Foundation rated Burton at 13.3 out of 60 for "individuality", putting it in the top ten clone towns in England, because of the large number of chain stores in the town centre. Since then events such as a French market have been organised to bring more footfall into the town centre.

=== Media ===
Media services include the Burton Mail, BBC Radio Derby, and Capital Mid-Counties.

=== Distribution and warehousing ===
Due to Burton's relative location in the centre of England and its transport links which allow easy access to Birmingham (the second largest UK city), Derby, Nottingham, Leicester and other locations, there are a significant number of warehouses based in Burton (and nearby Fradley Park).

Notable businesses with distribution centres and warehouses include B&Q, Boots, Hobbycraft, Holland & Barrett, DHL, Waterstones, Clipper and Amazon.

== Culture and community ==
=== Culture ===
The main venue for live theatre and other performing and visual arts is The Brewhouse, which is run by East Staffordshire Council. During the 1970s and 1980s a number of well known rock bands appeared at the 76 Club nightclub in Burton, including Dire Straits and the Sex Pistols. Bloodstock Open Air is an annual festival of heavy metal music, which takes place in August and has been held at Catton Hall in Walton-on-Trent, 8 miles south-west of Burton since 2005.

Burton Operatic Society is a musical theatre company based in Burton and produces two productions each year. The town was also home to the Burton School of Speech and Drama on Guild Street where many professional and amateur actors and actresses learned their craft. Following the closure of the school in July 1984, its in-house amateur company, the Little Theatre Players, continued life as an independent amateur drama company called The Little Theatre Company. LTC currently stages at least four productions a year in the town: two plays, a musical and a youth production.

Burton has one of the oldest amateur radio clubs in the UK. It was formed in 1919, although there were enthusiasts of wireless telegraphy in Burton well before the First World War. One of the founder members of the club was F. V. A. Smith, call sign XSR, (X = experimental station). Smith was licensed on 3 July 1914 and one month later, he received a message from the Marconi spark transmitter at Poldhu in Cornwall, being sent to London, on the eve of the outbreak of war. The message, which has survived and is in the present club archives, was announcing the mobilisation of Russian, French and Belgian troops.

The Statutes Fair takes place in the town every year on the first Monday and Tuesday after Michaelmas (29 September). This is usually on the first Monday/Tuesday in October but can occasionally fall on 30 September/1 October as in 2002. The fair occupies the Market Place and parts of High Street, New Street and Lichfield Street for two days.

=== Community facilities ===
The local Sea Cadet unit is TS (Training Ship) Modwena alongside the River Trent and road bridge. The town's Air Training Corps unit is No 351 (Burton-upon-Trent) Squadron. The local Army Reserve unit is F (Fire Support) Company, 4 Mercian Regiment, an infantry unit at Coltman House Army Reserve Centre, Hawkins Lane; the unit was formerly a volunteer brigade of the North Staffordshire Regiment.

== Landmarks ==
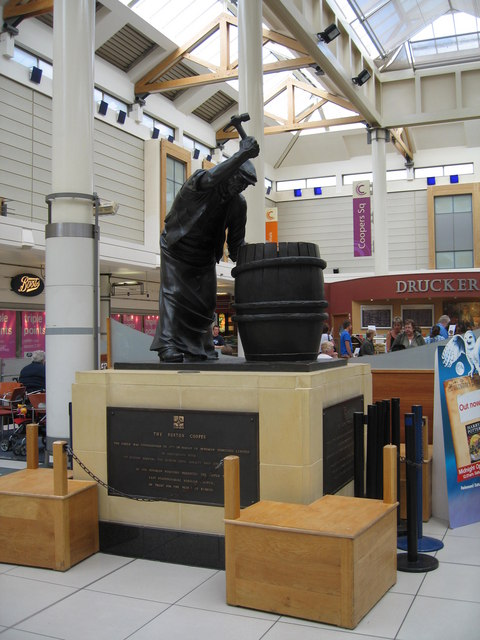
The Burton Cooper in Coopers Square Shopping Centre.

The town's connection with the brewing industry is celebrated in The Burton Cooper, a bronze sculpture by James Walter Butler. It was commissioned in 1977 and depicts a local craftsman making a barrel. It originally stood opposite the market and – despite opposition from many townspeople – was moved to its present location inside the Coopers Square Shopping Centre in 1994.

The National Brewery Centre, which celebrated the town's brewing heritage, was its biggest tourist attraction until it closed in 2022. Claymills Pumping Station on the north side of Burton is a restored Victorian sewage pumping station, adjacent to the modern sewage works. One of Burton's most distinguishable landmarks was Drakelow Power Station, just south of Burton on the opposite side of the River Trent, until the chimneys, boiler-house building and cooling towers were demolished in 2006.

The former Magistrates' Court is a distinctive neo-classical domed building in a commanding position facing Guild Street. It was built by Richard Kershaw to designs by Henry Beck and opened in 1909.

Finney's post, part of an ornate mediaeval oak post which once stood at the corner of the Market Place and High Street, is now in the Victoria and Albert Museum in London.

The Horninglow Street drill hall dates back to the early 19th century.

The former Ritz Cinema, built in 1935 in Modernist style with Art Deco interior, is in Guild Street.

== Transport ==
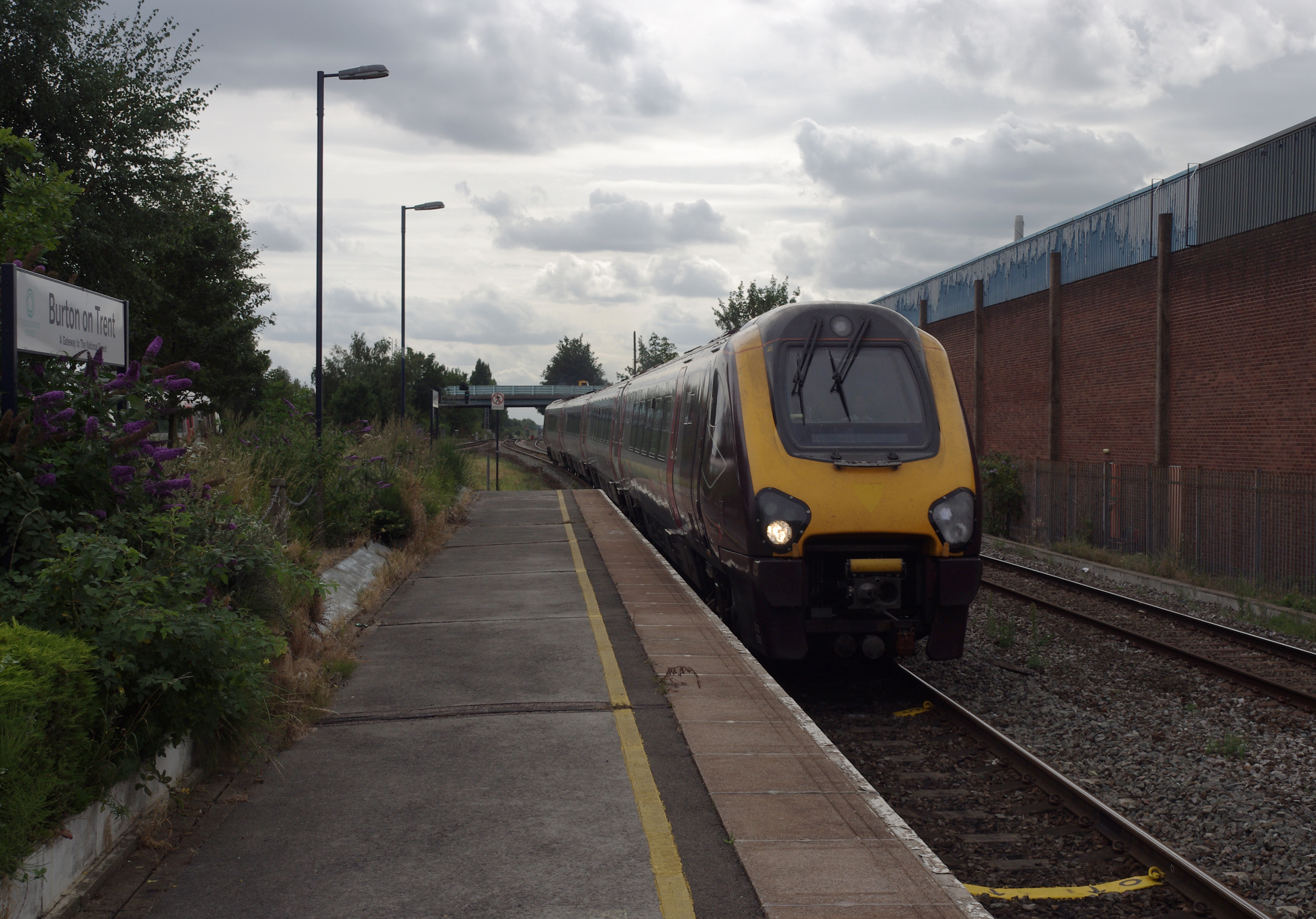
A CrossCountry Class 220 at Burton-on-Trent railway station in August 2010

=== River ===
Burton now lies on both sides of the River Trent. Historically, there was just one bridge over the river, Burton old bridge (which carries the A511) and there was a small ferry that operated from "time immemorial". This was eventually replaced by the Ferry Bridge. A second road crossing of the Trent is St Peter's Bridge (which carries the A5189) was opened in 1985.

=== Road ===
The A38, which bypasses the town, connects Burton to Birmingham and Derby. The A444 links traffic to Coventry and the M42 motorway and the A511 links traffic to Leicester. The A5121 carries traffic through the middle of Burton connecting to the A38, A5189 and A511 respectively. The A5189 runs (West-East) across Burton and connects the A444 through Burton and across the River Trent.

=== Rail ===
The town is served by Burton-on-Trent railway station, which is accessed from the bridge on Borough Road. The station has two platforms: platform one for Derby, Nottingham and the North; platform two for Tamworth, Birmingham and the South. The station is situated on the Cross Country Route between the principal cities of Derby and Birmingham.

The station's operator is East Midlands Railway, although none of their trains call there. All services are provided by CrossCountry, with trains between Cardiff Central, Birmingham and Nottingham, as well as longer-distance services to destinations such as Bristol Temple Meads, Leeds and Newcastle. Burton is positioned at the western terminus of the aborted Ivanhoe line towards Leicester.

The station utilises the PlusBus scheme where train and bus tickets can be bought together at a saving.

=== Bus ===
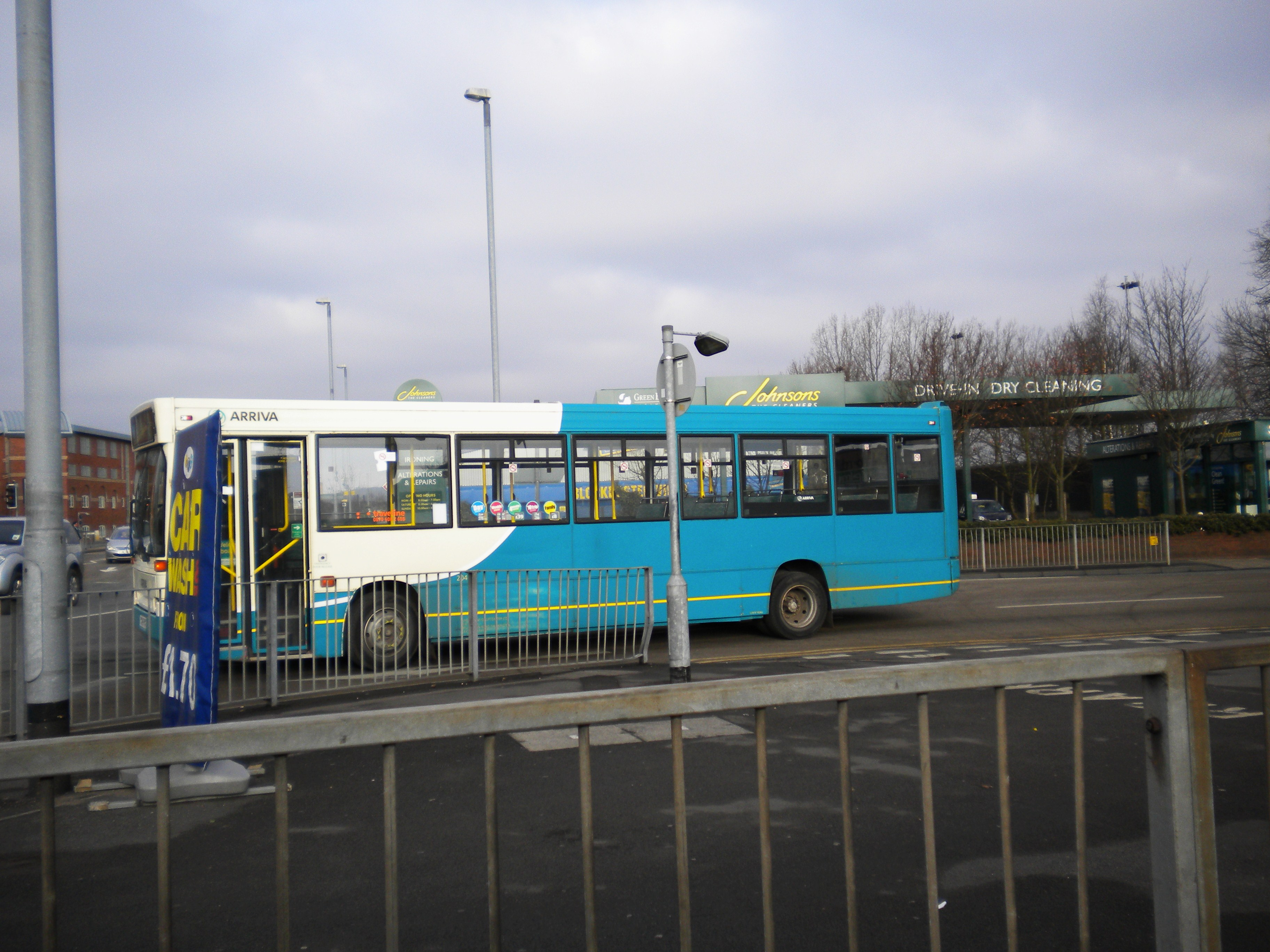
An Arriva Midlands bus in March 2010

Buses in Burton are primarily operated by Diamond East Midlands, serving Uttoxeter, Horninglow, Edge Hill, Stapenhill, Queen's Hospital Burton, Winshill, Stretton, Abbots Bromley, Tatenhill, Wetmore, Branston, Lichfield, Ashby-de-la-Zouch and East Midlands Airport. Other routes are operated by Arriva Midlands and Trentbarton (to Derby), and Evolve Bus & Coach (to Tutbury & Rough Hay) & Bus Link, serving Uttoxeter, Lichfield, Tamworth and they also run the majority of School Services.

Historically, the town had its own municipal buses operated by Burton Corporation Transport and later East Staffordshire District Council after 1974. This was taken over by Stevensons of Uttoxeter in the mid-1980s, and in turn was absorbed by Arriva Midlands in the late 1990s. Midland Classic took over the local depot of Arriva Midlands at Wetmore Road in August 2016, but were acquired by Rotala in 2022 and rebranded as Diamond East Midlands.

== Religious sites ==
The mother church of Burton is St Modwen's, a Georgian building which replaced the former Burton Abbey's church. Other Anglican parish churches built to serve the expanding population include Holy Trinity, St Mark's, Winshill, St Paul's, St John the Divine, Horninglow, St Chad's, All Saints and St Mary's, Stretton.

The Roman Catholic church in the town is St Mary and St Modwen's Catholic Church.

There are five mosques in Burton, three Bareilvi or Sufi, one Deobandi and one Salafi. There is a Sikh Gurdwara established in St Chad's Community Centre. Although there was a small Jewish community in Burton in the early half of the 20th century, there is no record of a synagogue being established. There was however a close relationship with the community in Derby, whose minister acted as visiting teacher and shochet.

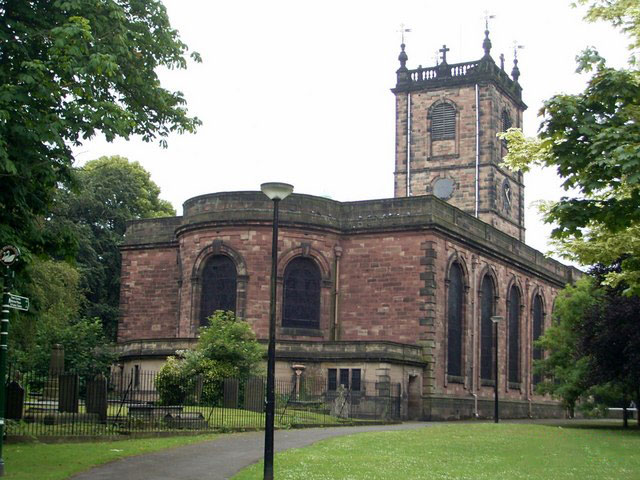
St Modwen's Church

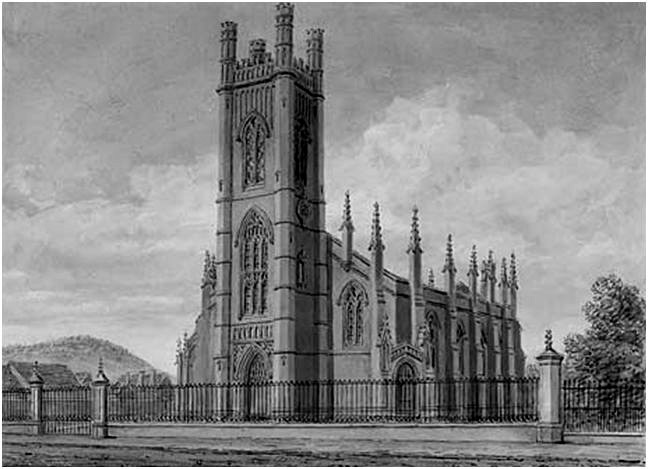
A Victorian drawing of Holy Trinity Church

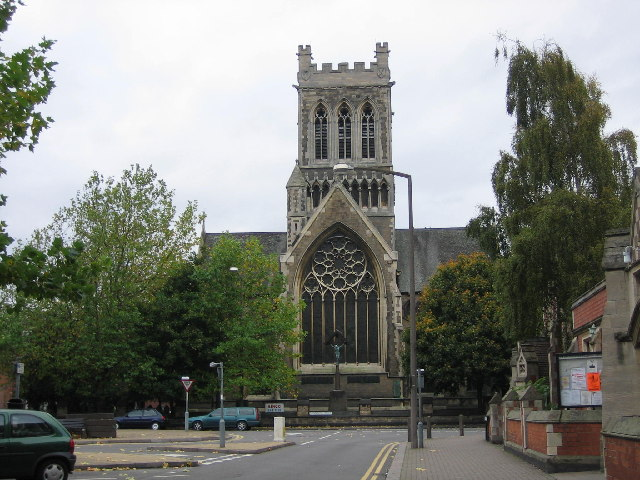
St Paul's Church

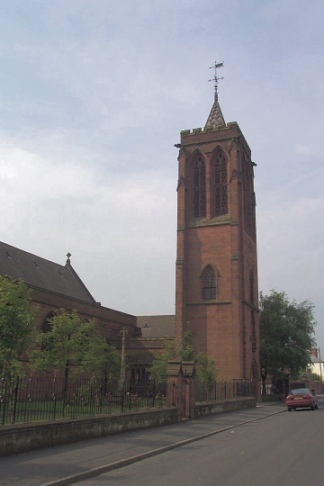
St Chad's Church

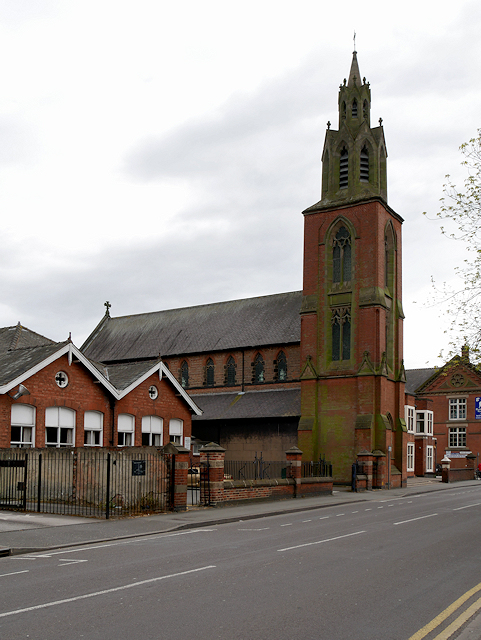
St Mary and St Modwen Catholic Church

== Education ==
Burton & South Derbyshire College (BSDC) is a general further education college and is situated in the town centre. It attracts approximately 13,000 students from Burton and the surrounding towns and villages. It delivers a wide range of courses for all ages including 14- to 19-year-olds, adults into part-time study, employer training and higher education. Recently a 'university centre' has been developed within the college to enable students to study on franchised higher education courses, but is not in itself a university.

The University of Wolverhampton's School of Health and Wellbeing has a presence at Burton Health Education Centre located at the Queen's Hospital, which specialises in nursing.

== Sport ==
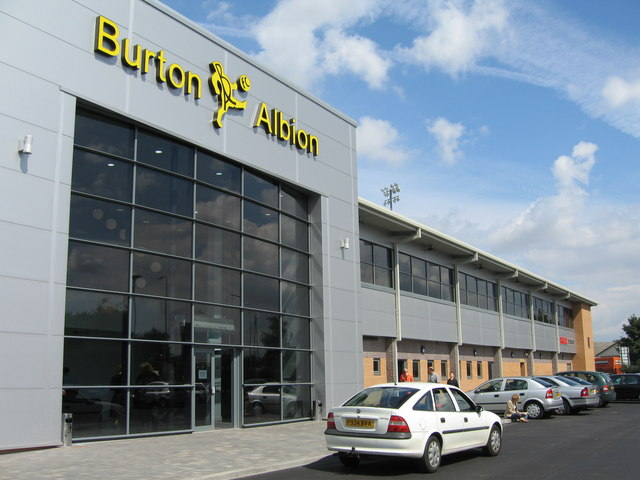
Pirelli Stadium, home of Burton Albion FC

Since the establishment of the Football League in 1888, Burton has been represented by four separate clubs in the League, two of which played in the league simultaneously in the 1890s. Burton Swifts became members of the Football League in 1892, and were joined by Burton Wanderers in 1894. Swifts played at Peel Croft, whilst Wanderers home ground was Derby Turn. Wanderers left the League in 1897, and the two clubs merged to form Burton United in 1901, with the new club playing at Peel Croft. United were voted out of the Football League in 1907, and folded in 1910. Burton All Saints were then left as the town's main club, becoming Burton Town in 1924, but folded in 1940. In 1950 Burton Albion were founded. Having moved from Eton Park to the Pirelli Stadium in 2005, Albion became the town's fourth Football League club in 2009 after winning the Football Conference. The team now play in League 1, the third tier of the English football league system, following relegation in 2017–18, after two years in The Championship. Burton is also the location of the St George's Park National Football Centre, which opened in 2012.

The Burton & District Cricket League has many notable clubs, including Burton Cricket Club, Dunstall Cricket Club, Abbott's Bromley, Yoxall and Lichfield Cricket Club.

Burton Rugby Football Club, one of the oldest rugby union clubs in the country, was established in 1870, when it played both association and rugby football rules. It did not adopt rugby union only rules until 1876.

The town is also home to the Burton Canoe Club on the banks of the River Trent. It has recently expanded and built its own clubhouse. Also along the River Trent in Burton are Burton Leander Rowing Club, which was founded in 1847 (and is one of the oldest rowing clubs in the country), and Trent Rowing Club, founded in 1863.

Burton Hockey Club was established in 1899. The club promotes and supports seven men's teams, four ladies' teams, and a popular and successful youth academy. Home matches are played at Shobnall Leisure Complex in the shadows of Marstons Brewery, Shobnall Road. The club has also been recognised as working towards providing a Safe, Effective and Child Friendly club environment, and as such has been awarded the England Hockey Club's First Accreditation, (EH id: 1180).

Burton is home to the Powerhouse Gym International All-Round Weightlifting team, which was set up in 1985 by Steve Gardner (former World All-Round Weightlifting Champion – inducted into the IAWA (UK) Hall of Fame in 2000). The club trains All-Round Weightlifters, including powerlifting and Olympic weightlifting and is affiliated to the International All-Round Weightlifting Association. The Burton club hosted the 2008 IAWA World Championships.

== Twin towns and sister cities ==
- Elkhart, Indiana, United States
- Bielawa, Poland

== See also ==
- List of people from Burton upon Trent
