= Lady Burton =

Lady Burton may refer to:

== Peerages ==
- Baroness Burton
- Baroness Burton of Coventry

== People ==
- Isabel, Lady Burton (1831–1896), English explorer and writer
- Nellie Lisa Melles, 2nd Baroness Burton (1873–1962), British hereditary peeress
- Elaine Burton, Baroness Burton of Coventry (1904 –1991), British politician and life peeress
- Harriett Georgina Thornewill Bass, Lady Burton, wife of Michael Bass, 1st Baron Burton
- Elizabeth Ursula Foster Wise Baillie, Lady Burton (died 1993), first wife of Michael Baillie, 3rd Baron Burton
- Coralie Denise Cliffen Baillie, Lady Birton (died 2022), second wife of the 3rd Baron Burton
- June Gordon Baillie, Lady Burton, wife of Evan Michael Ronald Baillie, 4th Baron Burton
- Lady Noreen Hastings (1880–1949), wife of Sir William Bass, 2nd Baronet

== Animals ==
- Lady Burton's rope squirrel
