= Chesterfield House, Westminster =

Former grand London townhouse in Mayfair

Coordinates: 51°30′25″N 0°9′0″W

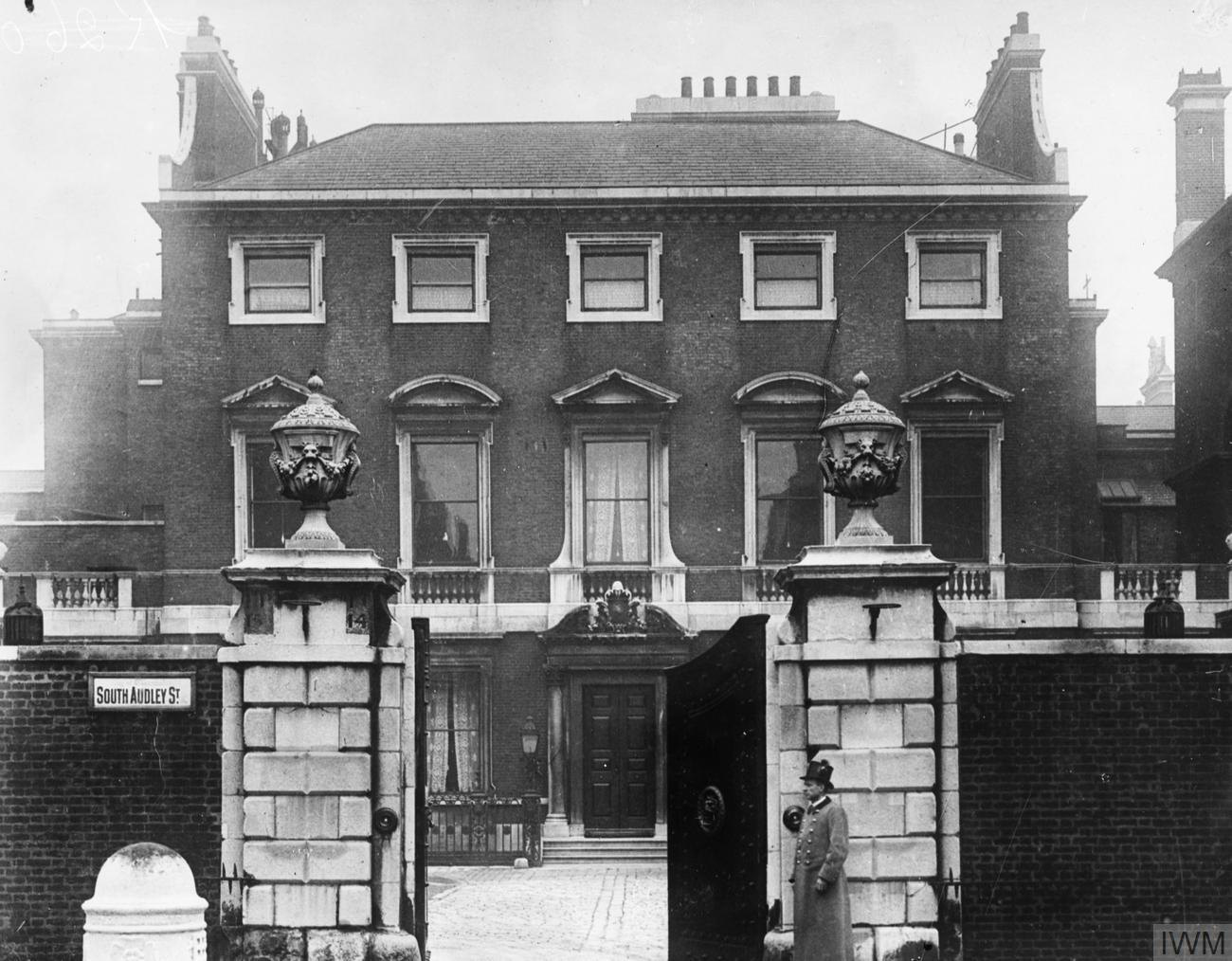
Chesterfield House, November 1917

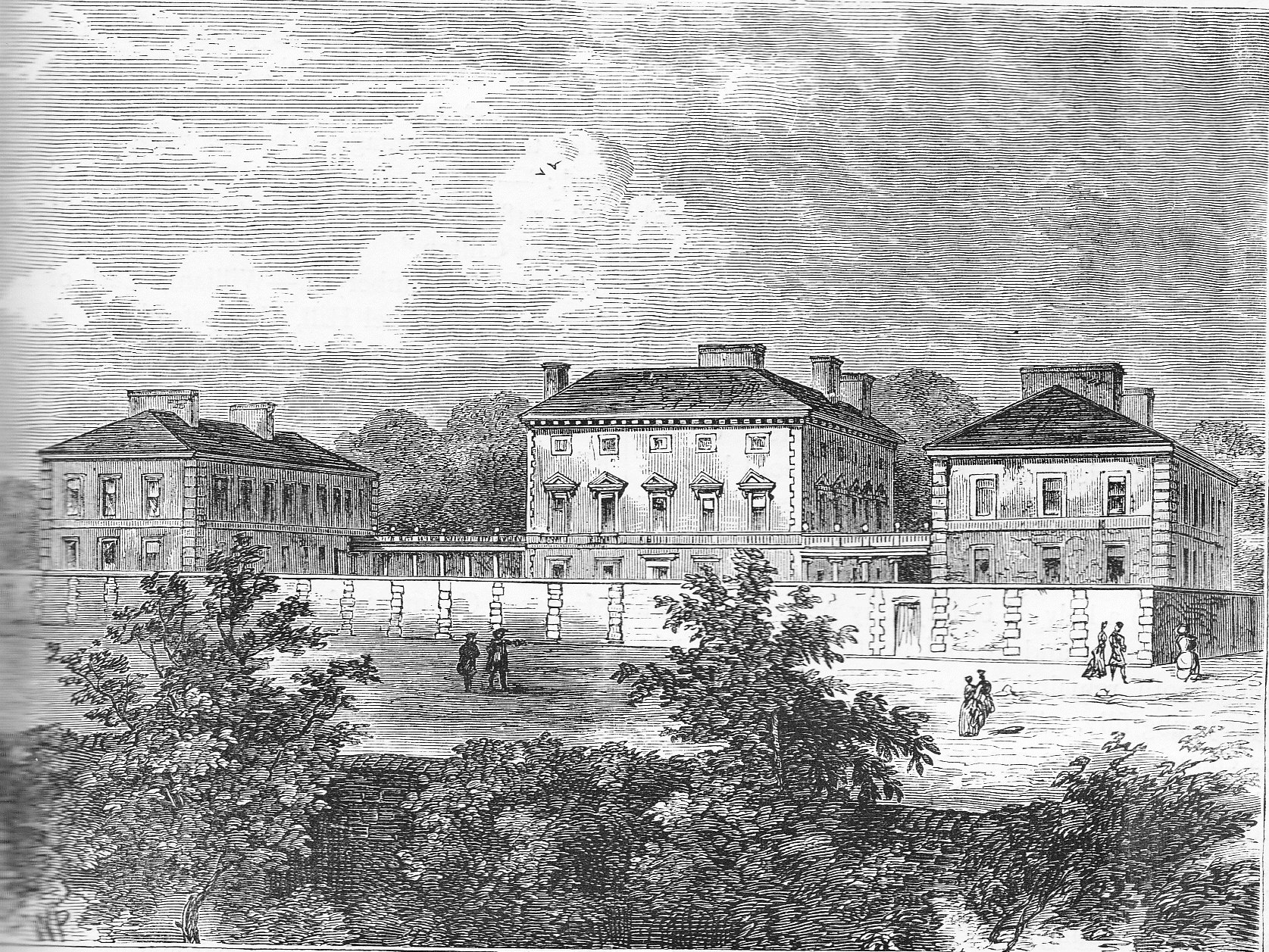
Chesterfield House in 1760, published in Walford's Old & New London (1878)

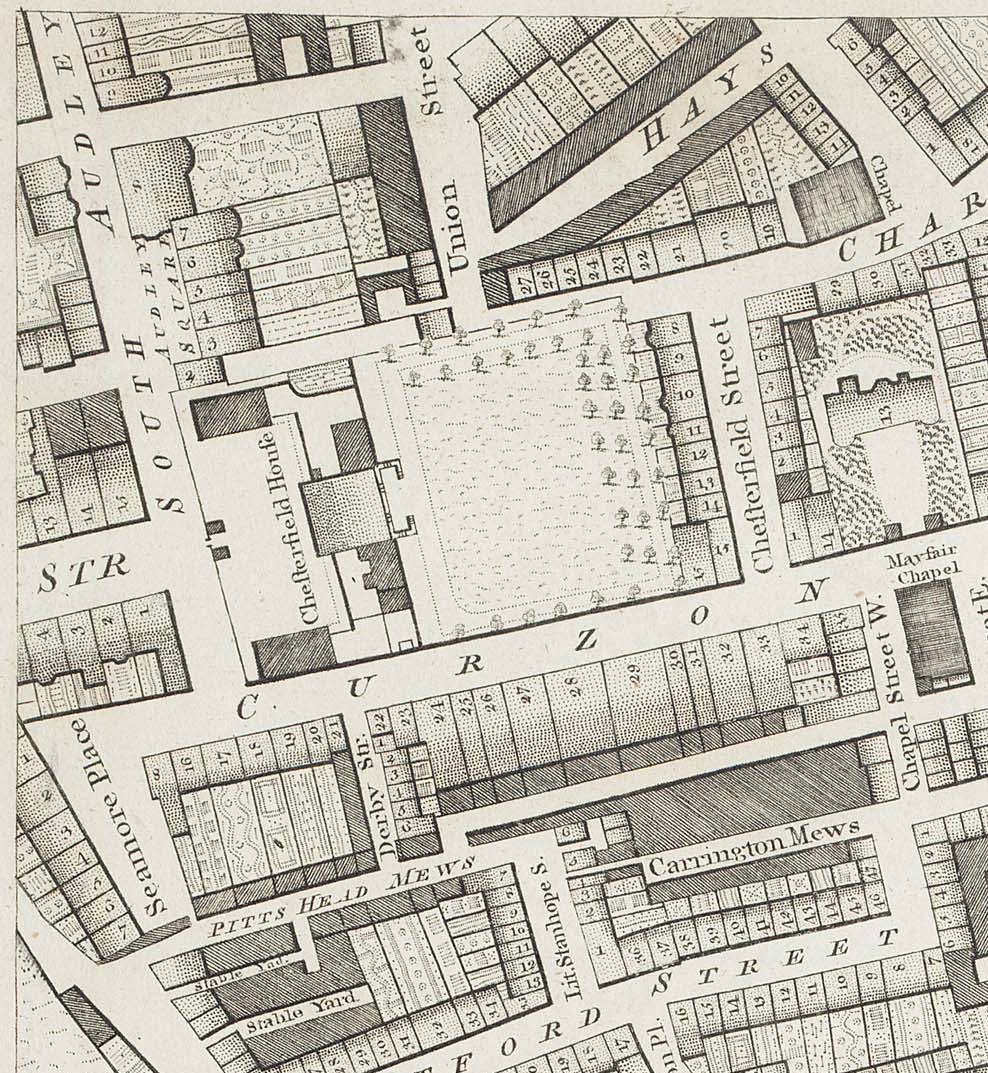
Chesterfield House as shown on Richard Horwood's 1799 map of London

Chesterfield House was a grand London townhouse built between 1747 and 1752 by Philip Stanhope, 4th Earl of Chesterfield (1694–1773), statesman and man of letters. The exterior was in the Palladian style, the interior Baroque. It stood in Mayfair on the north side of Curzon Street, between South Audley Street and what is now Chesterfield Street. It was demolished in 1937 and on its site now stands a block of flats of the same name.

The French travel writer Pierre-Jean Grosley in his book Londres (1770, translated as Tour to London) considered the house to be equal to the hotels particuliers of the nobility in Paris.

== History ==
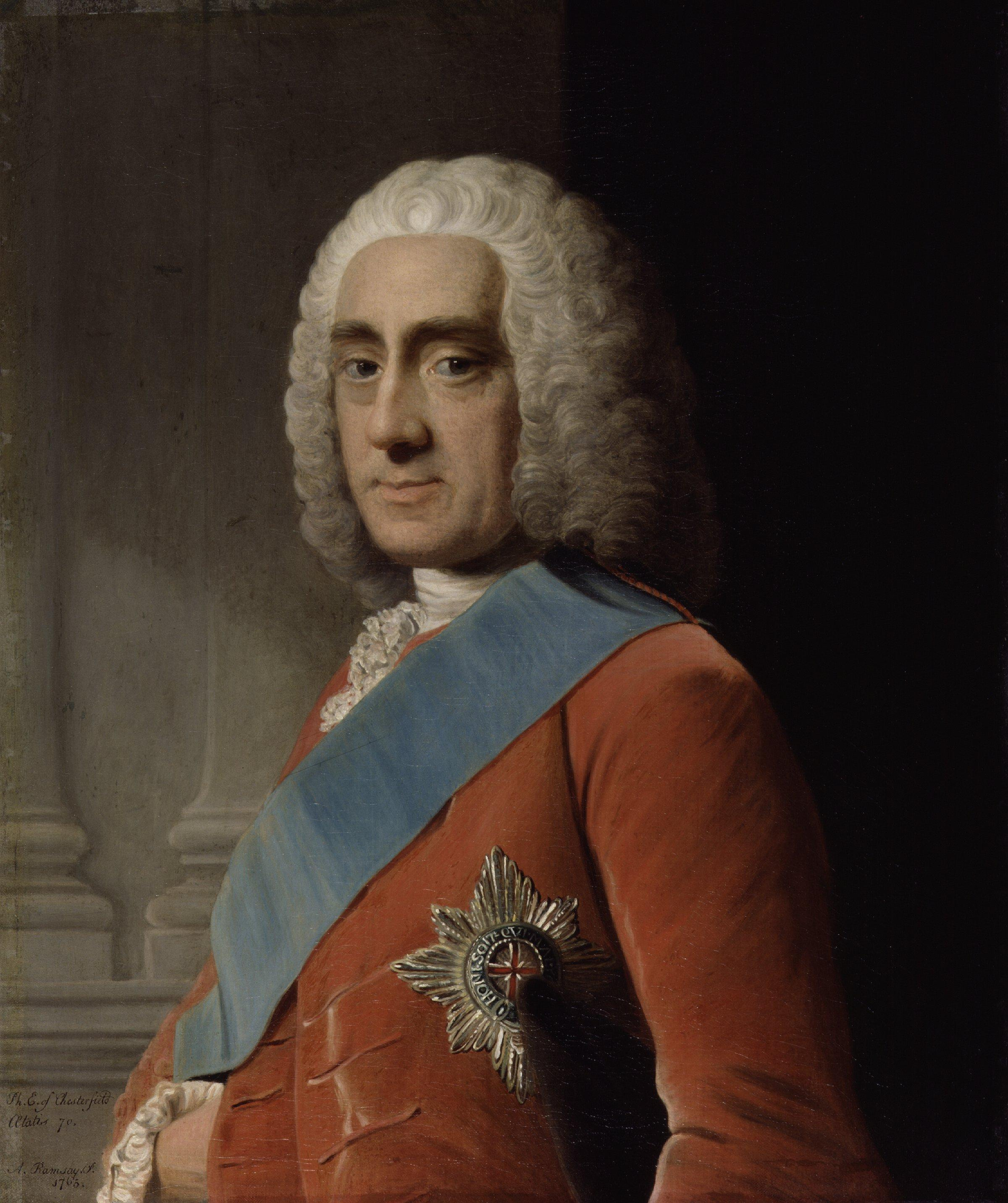
Philip Stanhope, 4th Earl of Chesterfield, who built Chesterfield House

The house was built on land belonging to Richard Howe, 1st Earl Howe by Isaac Ware. In his "Letters to his Son", Chesterfield wrote from "Hotel Chesterfield" on 31 March 1749: "I have yet finished nothing but my boudoir and my library; the former is the gayest and most cheerful room in England; the latter the best. My garden is now turfed, planted and sown, and will in two months more make a scene of verdure and flowers not common in London."

=== Ownership and occupants ===
In 1850 George Stanhope, 6th Earl of Chesterfield leased the House to James Hamilton, 2nd Marquess of Abercorn (later 1st Duke of Abercorn from 1868), who occupied the property until 1869. Faced with the prospect of demolition in 1869, the house was purchased by the City merchant Charles Magniac, for a reported sum of £175,000. Magniac considerably curtailed the grounds in the rear, and erected a row of buildings overlooking Chesterfield Street, named Chesterfield Gardens.

In 1884 Magniac sold Chesterfield House to brewing millionaire Sir Michael Bass, 1st Bt. Bass was elevated to the House of Lord as Baron Burton in 1884, and retained ownedship of Chesterfield House, where he died in 1909. Under the terms of Lord Burton's Will, a life interest in the House was granted to his widow, then to his daughter Nellie Lisa Melles, 2nd Baroness Burton, and thereafter entailed to her son Michael Baillie, 3rd Baron Burton and his heirs in tail male.

Following Lord Burton's death, the Dowager Lady Burton leased the House to Henry Innes-Ker, 8th Duke of Roxburghe and his American millionaire wife Mary Goelet. The Duke and Duchess of Roxburghe loaned the House to the British Government during World War I, and the house was placed at the disposal of the Head of the American Special Mission to the United Kingdom Colonel House immediately upon his arrival in London on 7 November 1917. The House continued to be Colonel House's base in London until 1919.

==== Royal residence: 1923-1934 ====
The Duchess of Roxburghe relinquished her lease of Chesterfield House in 1919; in the previous year the House had purchased by Henry Lascelles, Viscount Lascelles from the Dowager Lady Burton for £140,000, and he took up residence following Colonel House's departure in 1919. Lord Lascelles (who became the Sixth Earl of Harewood in 1929) later married Princess Mary in 1923, and the House served the couple's London home until the early 1930s. The house was loaned to Princess Mary's brother and sister-in-law Prince Albert, Duke of York and Elizabeth, Duchess of York as a temporary residence during the London season of 1924.

In 1931, King George V and Queen Mary purchased 32 Green Street, Mayfair as a London home for Princess Mary, rendering Chesterfield House superfluous to the couple's needs. Lord Harewood and Princess Mary moved out of the house on the weekend of 19–20 December 1931, and Lord Harewood sold the property in 1934.

==== Demolition ====
Following the sale of the house by Lord Harewood in 1934, the House was demolished and a new block of apartments had been erected on the site of the former Mansion. The new apartment building was also known as Chesterfield House, and reportedly had a rent-roll of £36,000 when it was sold to the Prudential Assurance Company in mid-1939.

== Interior features ==
=== Library ===
The Quarterly Review (founded 1809), no. 152, reported:

In the magnificent mansion which the earl erected in Audley Street you may still see his favourite apartments, furnished and decorated as he left them – among the rest, what he boasted of as “the finest room in London”, and perhaps even now it remains unsurpassed, his spacious and beautiful library looking on the finest private garden in London. The walls are covered half-way up with rich and classical stores of literature; above the cases are in close series the portraits of eminent authors, French and English, with most of whom he had conversed; over these, and immediately under the massive cornice, extend all round, in foot long capitals, the Horatian lines: "NUNC . VETERUM . LIBRIS . NUNC . SOMNO . ET . INERTIBUS . HORIS : DUCERE . SOLICITAE . JVCUNDA . OBLIVIA . VITAE." On the mantelpieces and cabinets stand busts of old orators, interspersed with voluptuous vases and bronzes, antique or Italian, and airy statuettes, in marble or alabaster, of nude or semi-nude opera nymphs.

=== Staircase ===
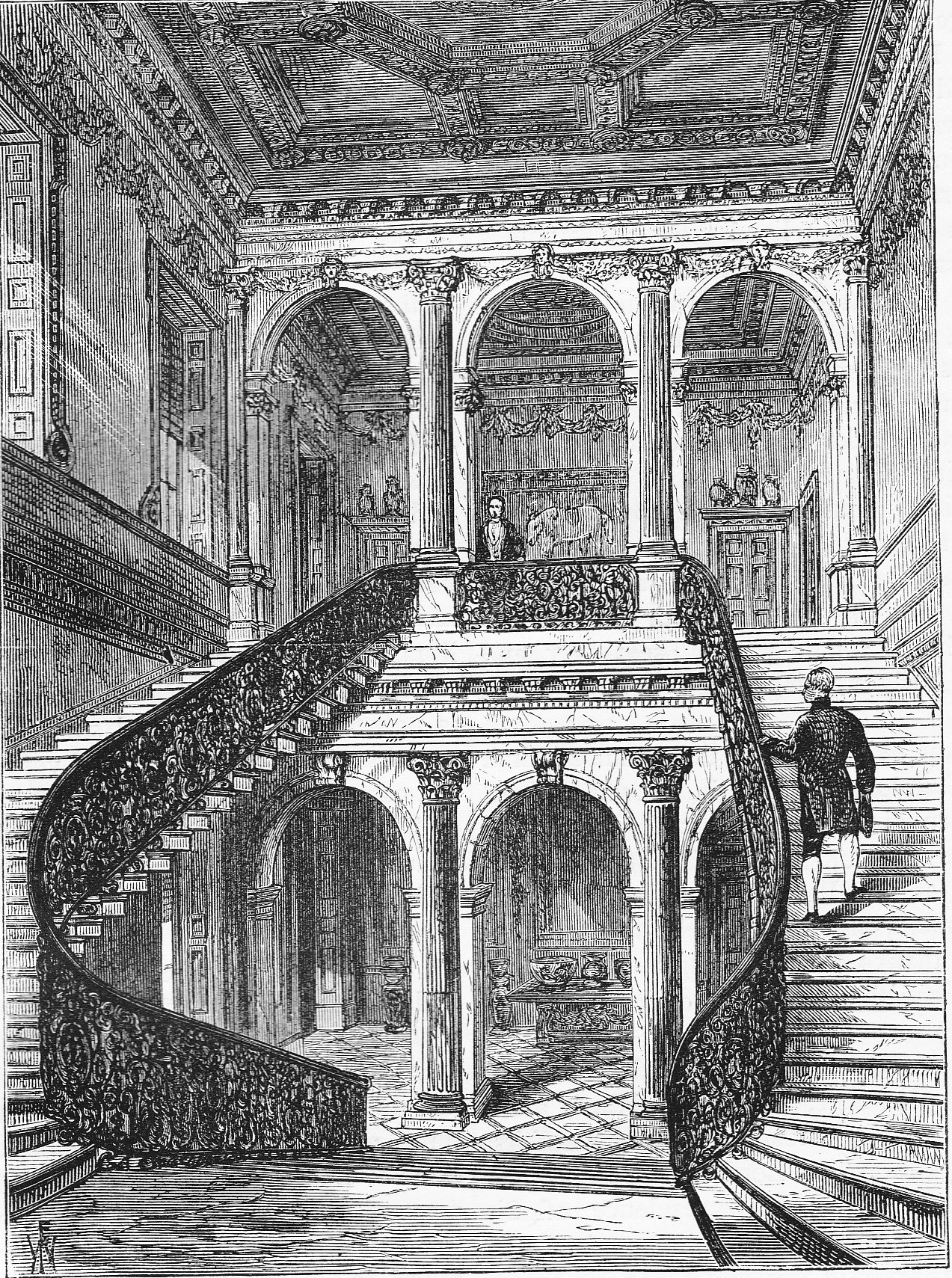
Staircase that originally came from Cannons, Edgware

The columns of the screen facing the courtyard and the marble staircase with bronze balustrade came from Cannons, near Edgware, the mansion of James Brydges, 1st Duke of Chandos (d.1744) which was demolished shortly after his death, the materials being sold at auction in 1747. Chesterfield also bought at the auction the portico and railings. Chesterfield also furnished his new mansion with artefacts from the sale at Houghton Hall, the country house of Robert Walpole, including an 18-candle copper-gilt lantern. The library was hung with portraits of the earl's ancestors. As a piece of satire concerning the fashion for boasts of ancient ancestry, he placed amongst these portraits two old portraits which he inscribed "Adam de Stanhope" and "Eve de Stanhope".

=== Creation of Stanhope Street ===
Chesterfield formed Stanhope Street on adjoining land purchased from the Dean and Chapter of Westminster.

=== Description in 1869 ===
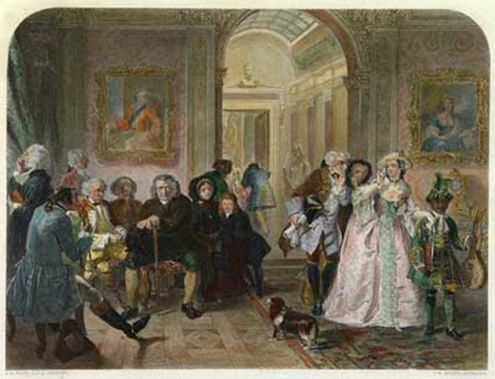
Dr. Johnson in the ante-room of Lord Chesterfield. Coloured engraving by E.M. Ward(d.1879) and C.W.Sharpe.

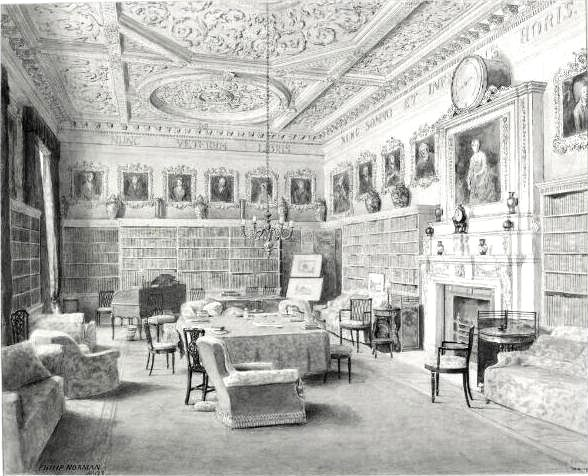
Interior of library of Chesterfield House 1893 by Philip Norman

The following description is reproduced in Edward Walford's Old & New London:

The house itself has many fine points, and in others, it must be owned, it is slightly disappointing. Passing from the porter's lodge across a noble court paved with stones, and entering the hall, the visitor cannot fail to be struck by the grand marble staircase, up and down which the great Chandos must have walked when it stood beneath his own palatial roof at Canons. And, apart from historical traditions, it is really a staircase for ideas to mount, especially when one is met on its first landing, not only by busts of Pitt and Fox, but by a lofty clock, apparently of antique French construction, and which looks as though it had, at some time or other, chimed out the hours at Versailles. Entering the music-room by means of this same staircase, we confess to some sense of disappointment. Not, of course, that we had expected to be greeted by any harmony of sweet sounds, but that the symbolism of decoration on the walls, on the ceiling, and the mantelpiece, might on the whole have been more graceful and more appropriate than it is, considering that the two fiddles in bas-relief, gilt and crossed one over the other, are scarcely to be compared in appearance with harps, lyres, etc., the usual metaphorical tributes to the Muse of Melody...More pleasingly reminded, however, of that same court (i.e. Versailles) is the visitor on descending to the reception rooms on the lower floor, and entering the drawing room, which is especially called the French room. There not only do the panelling of the walls, and the construction of the various pieces of furniture transport one back to the glories of the ancient regime of the time when Chesterfield enjoyed its society, but the looking-glasses, one over the fire-place and another facing it, appear as though they had mirrored that society, and not only mirrored but multiplied it; for thes looking-glasses, being severally formed of various panels, fit mosaic-like one into another and the divisions of these panels being ornamented by wreaths of painted flowers, etc., the beholder is reproduced again and again, and in many a fantastic multiform, may judge of himself under various, not to say versatile, aspects. In one of the apartments – another drawing room to which this French salon leads – hangs a large chandelier, formed of pendant crystal, which once belonged to Napoleon I. The mantel-shelf in this room is classically beautiful; and amongst the pictures on the walls is a fine copy of Titian's Venus. But perhaps the most interesting apartment in the whole house is the library. There where Lord Chesterfield used to sit and write, still stand the books which it is only fair to suppose that he read – books of wide-world and enduring interest, and which stand in goodly array, one row above another by hundreds... In another room, not far from the library, one seems to gain an idea of the noble letter-writer's daily life, for we can still see its ante-chamber, in which the aspirants for his lordship's favour were sometimes kept waiting. (This room is immortalised in the Victorian portrayal by E.M. Ward (d.1879) of Dr Johnson in the ante-room of Lord Chesterfield). On the garden-front outside is a stone or marble terrace, overlooking the large lawn, stretching out in lawn and flower-beds behind the house.

George Capel-Coningsby, 5th Earl of Essex (d.1839) remembered seeing the earl sitting on a rustic seat in front of his mansion, basking in the sun.

== See also ==
- List of demolished buildings and structures in London
- Ranger's House is the modern name for the house in Greenwich acquired by the 4th Earl in 1748 and renamed Chesterfield House
- Bretby Hall – Derbyshire seat of the Stanhope family

== Sources ==
- Walford, Edward. Old & New London: A Narrative of Its History, Its People & Its Places, 6 vols., London, 1878, vol 4, pp. 353–359
