= Rangemore =

Village in Staffordshire, England

Coordinates: 52.8°N 1.74°W

- Location within Staffordshire
- OS grid reference: SK182229
- District: East Staffordshire
- Shire county: Staffordshire
- Region: West Midlands
- Country: England
- Sovereign state: United Kingdom
- Post town: BURTON-ON-TRENT
- Postcode district: DE13
- Dialling code: 01283
- Police: Staffordshire
- Fire: Staffordshire
- Ambulance: West Midlands
- UK Parliament: Lichfield

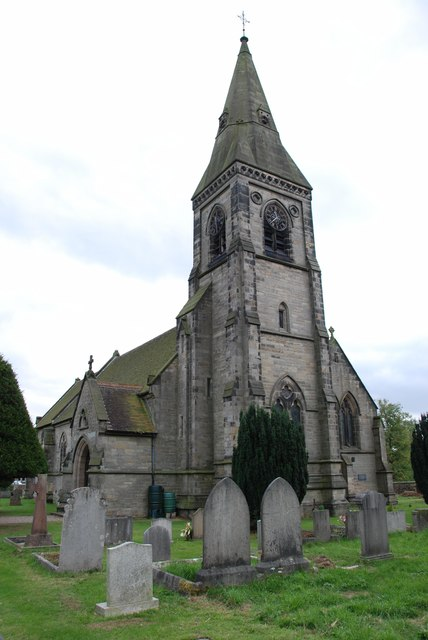
All Saints Church, Rangemore

Rangemore is a village in the borough of East Staffordshire, situated approximately 4 miles (6 km) west of the town of Burton upon Trent, on a ridge of high ground about a mile due west of the village of Tatenhill where the population from the 2011 census can be found.

Rangemore is in Needwood Forest, which is part of the National Forest.

The Church of England parish church of All Saints belongs to the Diocese of Lichfield. The Grade II* church was designed by the Gothic Revival architect William Butterfield for Michael Thomas Bass and built in 1866–67. The chancel was designed by G.F. Bodley and added in 1895.

The National Football Centre (NFC) of the England National Team received planning permission and funding from the Football Association in late 2010 to develop the nearby Byrkley Lodge site.

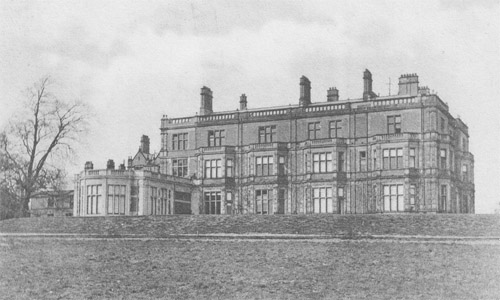
Byrkley Lodge, home of MP Hamar Alfred Bass, demolished 1952

== Rangemore Hall ==
Rangemore Hall was rebuilt in the late 1850s, around an earlier 1822 core, for Michael Bass, head of the brewery Bass, Ratcliff and Gretton, and was first occupied in 1860. His son Lord Burton reconstructed and extended the house (adding the Edward VII south wing), in Italianate style in 1898-1901 for a visit of King Edward VII in 1902 (with a second visit on 5 January 1907, including Queen Alexandra and Mrs Alice Keppel, the King's mistress).

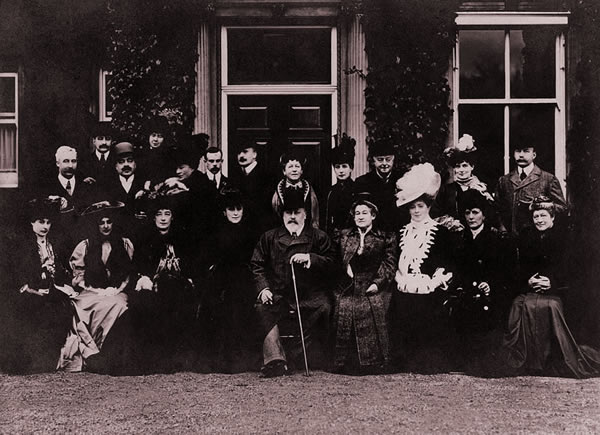
Party at Rangemore Hall, January 1907, for King Edward VII and Queen Alexandra

The grounds, which include a 2 1/2 acres (10,100 m^{2}) lake, were landscaped by Sir Joseph Paxton and later by Edward Milner. Nellie Lisa Bass sold the Hall to Staffordshire County Council in 1949 for £40,000. Rangemore Hall operated as Needwood School for the Partially Deaf from 1954 to 1985. The Hall was then converted into 8 wings and apartments, the main one being the Edward VII Wing, with others including the Ewing Wing, the Keppel Suite and the Paxton Suite; with other homes being converted from the remaining estate buildings, such as the Orangery. In March 2006 the Edward VII Wing was purchased by Hilary Devey for £2m. In 2013, it was put on the market for £1.95M.

== See also ==
- Listed buildings in Tatenhill
