= James E. B. Baillie =

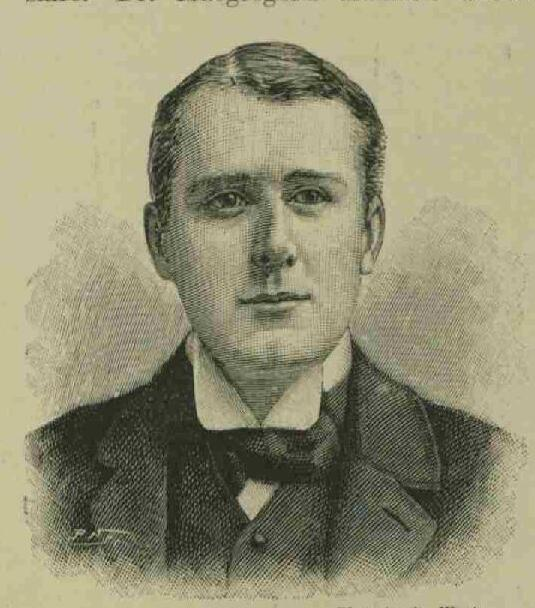
- Born: 1859
- Died: 6 May 1931 (aged 71–72)
- Occupation: Politician
- Position held: member of the 26th Parliament of the United Kingdom (1895–1900), member of the 25th Parliament of the United Kingdom (1895–1895)

James Evan Bruce Baillie, MVO, JP, DL (1859 – 6 May 1931) was Unionist MP for Inverness-shire. He was elected at a by-election in 1895, was re-elected in the general election later that year, but stood down in 1900

Baillie was the son of Evan Peter Montagu Baillie and Lady Frances Anna Bruce, daughter of the 7th Earl of Elgin. He married in 1894 The Hon. Nellie Lisa Bass, later 2nd Baroness Burton suo jure, daughter of the brewer Michael Bass, 1st Baron Burton. They had two sons. His grandson was Michael Baillie, 3rd Baron Burton.

Baillie was major and honorary colonel of the Inverness-shire Royal Horse Artillery (Territorial Force), having previously been a captain in the 3rd Battalion, Northumberland Fusiliers. He owned 92,000 acres.
