= Hamar Bass =

British brewer, race horse breeder, and politician

Hamar Alfred Bass
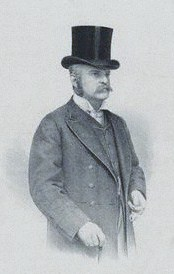
- Born: 30 July 1842; Burton upon Trent
- Died: 8 April 1898 (aged 55)
- Relatives: Michael Bass, 1st Baron Burton; Emily Bass; Alice Bass

Hamar Alfred Bass (30 July 1842 – 8 April 1898) was a British brewer, race horse breeder and a Liberal Party politician who sat in the House of Commons from 1878 to 1898.

== Early life ==
Bass was born in Burton upon Trent, the second son of brewer Michael Thomas Bass and his wife Eliza Jane Arden, daughter of Major Samuel Arden of Longcrofts Hall, Stafford. Bass was the great-grandson of William Bass, the founder of the brewery firm of Bass & Co, and his elder brother became Lord Burton. Bass was educated at Harrow School and became a Director of the family firm of Bass, Ratcliff, Gretton and Co., although his father barred him from brewery affairs because of Hamar's gambling problems.

== Cricket career ==
Bass played cricket for the Marylebone Cricket Club (MCC), making a single first-class appearance for the MCC against Sussex in 1865. He was dismissed in the MCC's first-innings by James Lillywhite, while in their second innings he was dismissed for 3 runs by George Wells. The match ended in a draw.

== Militia career ==
He was commissioned into the part-time King's Own (3rd Staffordshire) Rifle Militia on 15 June 1860 and rose to be the regiment's commanding officer, when it had become the 4th Battalion, North Staffordshire Regiment. After retirement from the command he was appointed the battalion's Honorary Colonel on 8 July 1893.

== Political career ==
Bass was elected MP for Tamworth at a in by-election in 1878 and held the seat until 1885 when the representation was reduced to one seat under the Redistribution of Seats Act 1885. He was elected MP for West Staffordshire in the 1885 general election and held the seat until his death aged 55 in 1898 from a complex form of rheumatism. He was also a J.P. for Staffordshire.

== Bass Charity Vase ==
In 1889, Bass, along with Lord Burton founded the Bass Charity Vase – an association football competition that raised money for medical charities. As of 2021, the competition still occurs annually and continues its charitable work.

== Equestrian career ==
Bass was a breeder at the Byrkley Stud and his horse "Love Wisely" won the Ascot Gold Cup in 1896. He was also for 12 years master of the Meynell Hunt.

== Family life ==
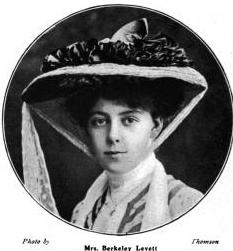
Sibell Bass Levett, daughter of Hamar Bass, wife of Major Berkeley Levett

Bass married Louisa Bagot (1853–1942), daughter of William Bagot, 3rd Baron Bagot, in 1879. They lived at Byrkley Lodge and Needwood House, Burton, and also at 145 Piccadilly, London. After his death, Louisa married Rev Bernard Shaw.

Bass's sister Emily Bass married Sir William Plowden, MP for Wolverhampton West, and his sister Alice Bass married Sir George Chetwode being the mother of Field Marshal Philip Chetwode.

Bass's son William succeeded in his uncle's baronetcy according to special remainder. Hamar Bass's daughter Sibell Lucia married Major Berkeley John Talbot Levett of the Scots Guards, son of Theophilus Levett of Wychnor Park, Staffordshire. Berkeley Levett served as one of the Gentlemen Ushers to the Royal Family from 1919 to 1937.

== See also ==
- Rangemore, Staffordshire

Parliament of the United Kingdom
Preceded by Sir Robert Peel; Robert William Hanbury	Member of Parliament for Tamworth; 1878–1885; With: Sir Robert Peel 1878–80; Jabez Balfour 1880–85	Succeeded by Philip Muntz
Preceded by Alexander Staveley Hill; Francis Monckton	Member of Parliament for West Staffordshire; 1885–1898	Succeeded by Sir Alexander Henderson
