= Sir William Bass, 2nd Baronet =

British race horse owner

Sir William Arthur Hamar Bass, 2nd Baronet
- Born: 24 December 1879
- Died: 28 February 1952 (aged 72)
- Occupation: Racehorse owner

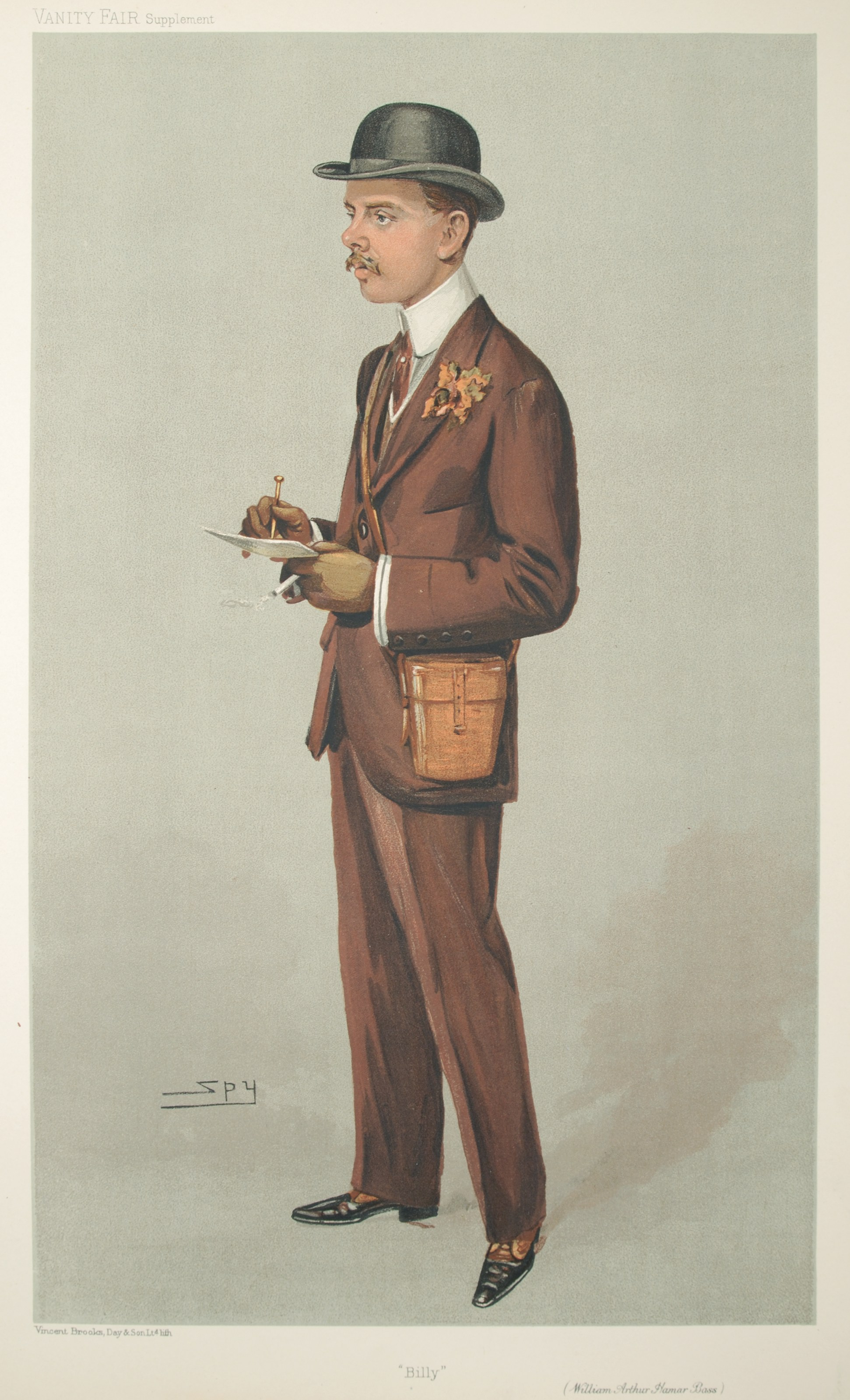
"Billy" as depicted by Spy (Leslie Ward) in Vanity Fair, September 1905

Sir William Arthur Hamar Bass, 2nd Baronet (24 December 1879 – 28 February 1952) was a British racehorse owner and a significant contributor to the racing industry. He also provided support for the British film industry in its early days.

== Biography ==
Bass was the son of Hamar Alfred Bass and his wife Louisa Bagot (1853–1942), daughter of William Bagot, 3rd Baron Bagot. His father's family traced its fortunes to William Bass, who founded the famous Bass Brewery.

He was educated at Harrow School and started at Trinity College, Cambridge, but appears to have decided to join the army instead. He was commissioned a second lieutenant in the 3rd Battalion, the East Surrey Regiment on 14 April 1898. He transferred to the 10th (Prince of Wales's Own Royal) Hussars on 18 November 1899 and served in the Second Boer War in South Africa from 1900 to 1902, attached to a provisional regiment of hussars, during which he was promoted to lieutenant on 3 October 1900. Following the end of the war, he returned from Cape Town to England on SS Maplemore in August 1902. In the First World War he served with the Reserve Regiments of Cavalry.

He lived at Byrkley Lodge in the Tatenhill area of Staffordshire. He succeeded to the baronetcy of Stafford in 1909 following the death of his uncle, Michael Bass, 1st Baron Burton.

Bass was first chairman of Provincial Cinematograph Theatres, which was founded in 1909 with the aim of opening a cinema in every town in the UK with a population of 250,000 or more. He also gave financial support to the London Film Company. However, Sir William (or Billy Bass as he was known) was most noted for his ownership of racehorses. He was a member and steward of the Jockey Club, was on the National Hunt Committee and joint Master of the Royal Hunt. He enjoyed his first success in the Cesarewitch Handicap in 1903 with Grey Tick, and also owned the horses Rosedrop, Cyllene and Sceptre. He was a Steward of the Pony Turf Club and was involved in the foundation of Northolt Park Racecourse in 1929.

In 1947, along with others, Bass continued the family tradition of acting as a benefactor to the Burton upon Trent area by donating a peal of five bells to All Saints Church to be installed as a war memorial.

== Family ==
Sir William married Lady (Wilmot Ida) Noreen Hastings (1880–1949), second daughter of the 14th Earl of Huntingdon and a notable sportswoman, in 1903, but died, aged 72, without having children, leading to the extinction of the baronetcy. He left his fortune to his wife's nephew, the trainer Peter Hastings (d. 1964) who changed his name to Hastings-Bass. Peter's eldest son William Edward Robin Hood Hastings-Bass (b. 1948) is the present and 17th Earl of Huntingdon.

== Notes ==
Baronetage of the United Kingdom
Preceded by Michael Bass	Baronet (of Stafford); 1909–1952	Extinct
