= 145 Piccadilly =

Former townhouse in Mayfair, London

Coordinates: 51°30′13″N 0°09′01″W

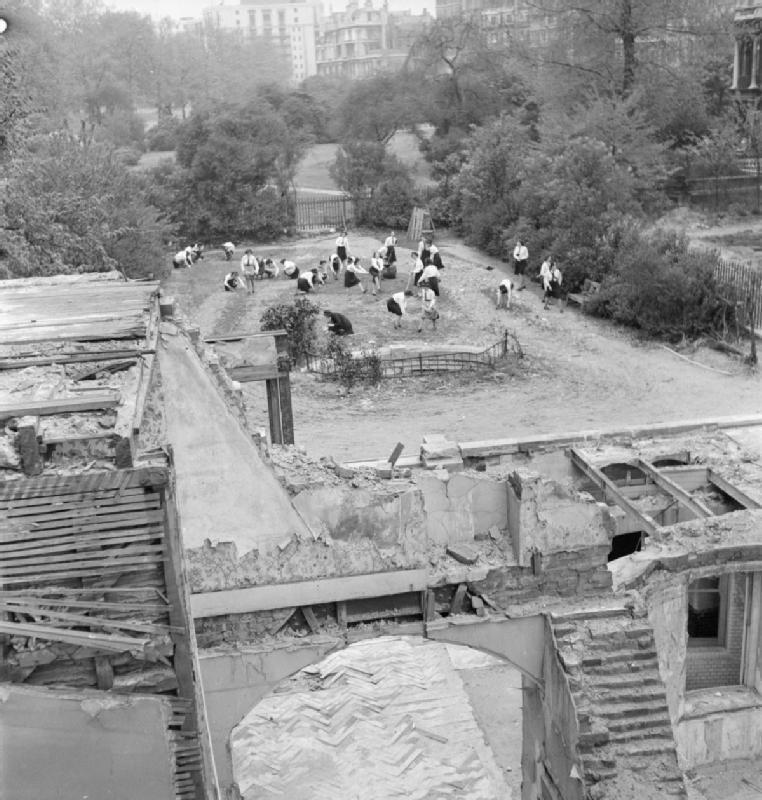
The ruined site of 145 Piccadilly being used as an allotment by the Girls' Training Corps in 1942

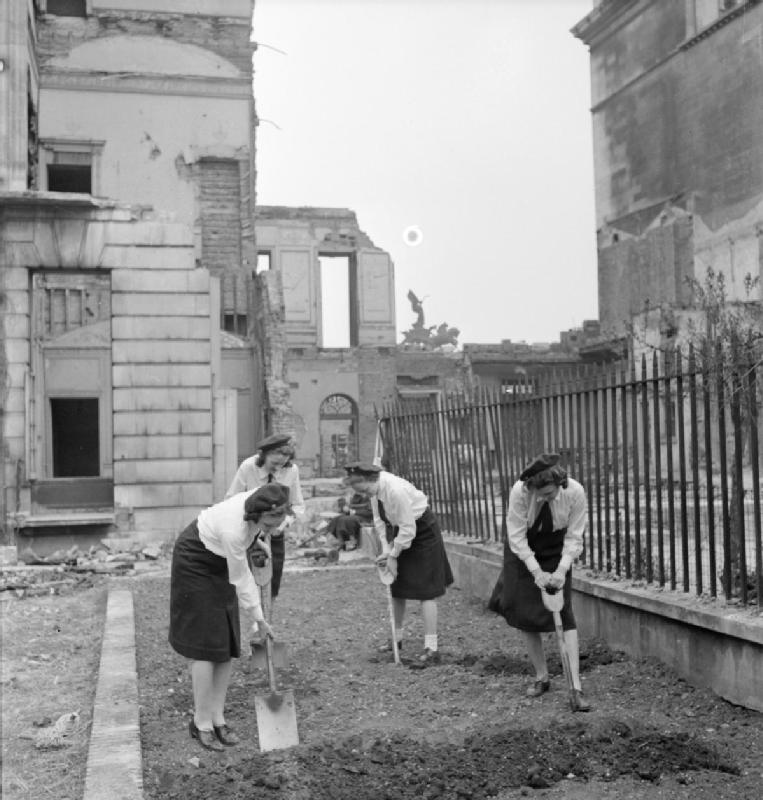
The ruins of 145 Piccadilly in 1942

145 Piccadilly was a large terraced townhouse on Piccadilly in the London district of Mayfair that was built in the late 18th century. It was the residence of Hamar Bass in the late 19th century, and from 1926 to 1936 was home to the Duke and Duchess of York (subsequently King George VI and Queen Elizabeth) and their two young daughters, Princesses Elizabeth and Margaret. It was badly damaged in a German air raid in 1940, during World War II, and demolished in 1959.

== Location and description ==
The house faced Green Park and was near the Hyde Park Corner end of Piccadilly. It was built c. 1795 to designs by Samuel Pepys Cockerell for Sir Drummond Smith, 1st Baronet. It was set over five storeys with 25 rooms, a ballroom and a library. The house opened onto a large hallway with green columns. The house had an electric lift and a large glass dome was situated in the roof. A morning room overlooked a small garden which led to Hamilton Gardens, a communal garden shared with the other residents of adjoining houses. Hamilton Gardens directly joined Hyde Park.

== History ==
William Purey, the eldest son of William Cust, died at No. 145 on 11 February 1845, aged 44. The German pianist and composer Jacques Blumenthal held his Annual Grande Matinee Musicale at the house in June 1859 when it was the residence of Spencer Compton, 2nd Marquess of Northampton.

It was the residence of the brewer and politician Hamar Bass in the 1880s and 1890s. He left it in 1898 to his son Sir William Bass, 2nd Baronet. Albert Maximilian von Goldschmidt-Rothschild and his wife occupied No. 145 from 1912. The Central Voluntary Work Rooms of the British Red Cross were based at the house during World War I to coordinate the efforts of making garments for troops in the war.

An auction of contents from the house was held on 4 October 1921 by Dowsett, Knight & Taylor. The freehold of the house was held by the Crown Estate and the remaining 21 years of the lease were put up for tender in November 1921. A 60-year lease was put up for sale in May 1922. The Health and Empire Christmas Market was opened at the house by Princess Louise, Duchess of Argyll in 1922. In 1924 the house was the headquarters of Lord Haig's British Legion Appeal Fund's "Poppy Day" (subsequently known as Remembrance Day). In November 1924 Edward, Prince of Wales visited the house after visiting the Poppy Factory in St James's Road in Bermondsey.

=== Duke and Duchess of York ===
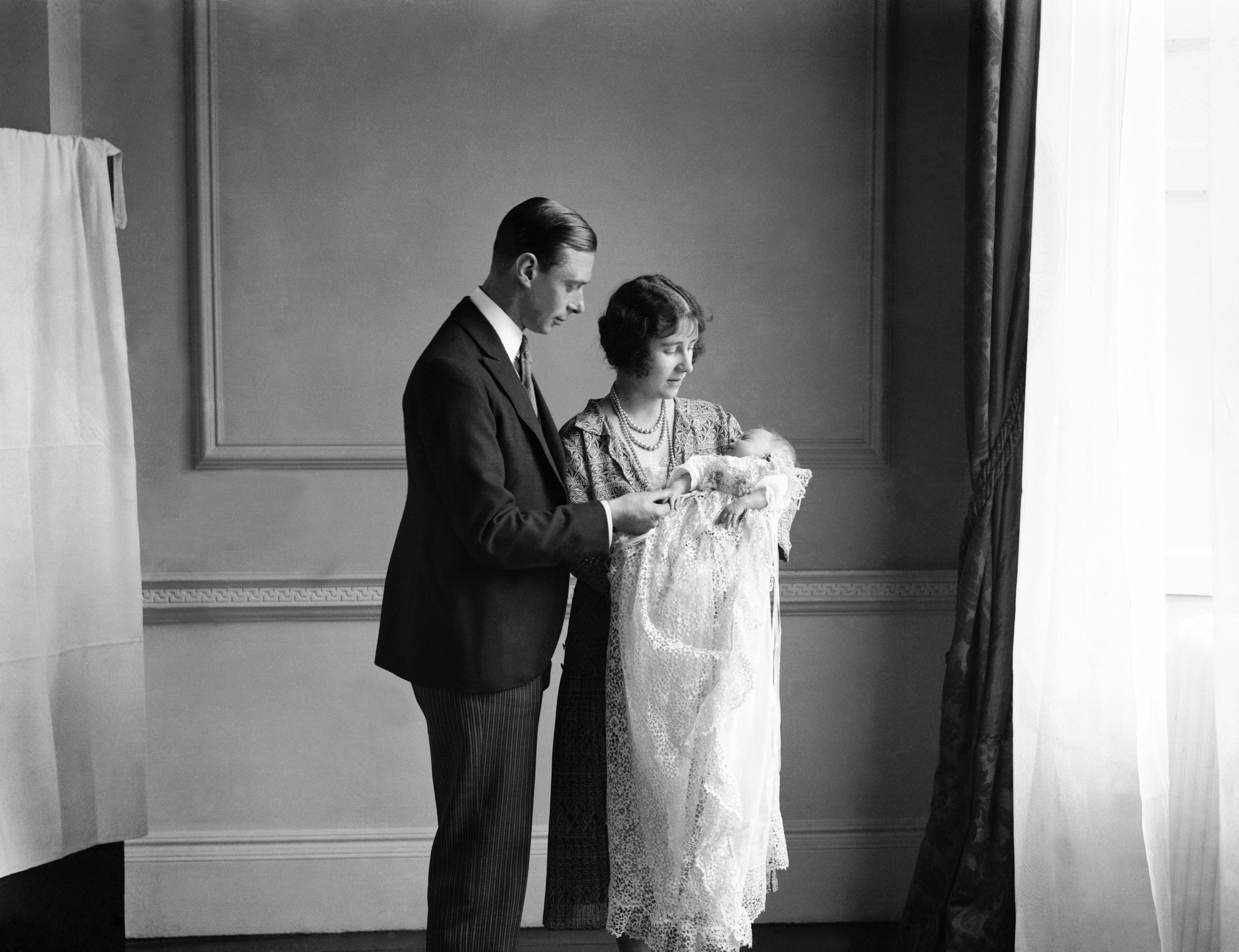
The Duke and Duchess of York with Princess Elizabeth in 1926

The Duke and Duchess of York (subsequently King George VI and Queen Elizabeth) lived there with their two young daughters, Princesses Elizabeth and Margaret, from 1926 to 1936. The Yorks would stay at the Royal Lodge in Windsor when outside London. The house had day and night nurseries for the young princesses. The day nursery had a tall cabinet with curios and gifts from all over the British Empire given by the princess's grandmother, Queen Mary. Princess Elizabeth's rooms were on the fourth floor of the house. Elizabeth's sister, Margaret, was born in 1930. The Yorks moved into the house with their daughters following their return from a six-month tour of Australia and New Zealand. The family had previously lived at nearby 17 Bruton Street. The Yorks stood before crowds on the balcony of the house on 27 June 1927 with their baby daughter, Elizabeth, following their return from the trip. The Yorks moved from 145 Piccadilly in December 1936 to Buckingham Palace with George's ascension to the British throne following the abdication of his brother Edward. Buckingham Palace had been neglected during Edward's brief reign, and George was said to have preferred to carry on living at No. 145. Plans to build a secret tunnel between the two houses were discussed.

In her book The Little Princesses, the princesses' governess, Marion Crawford described the house as "a homelike and unpretentious household" and that she had "never known a house with a nicer atmosphere". Crawford taught the two girls in a schoolroom on the third floor. Princess Elizabeth's toys at the house included 30 toy horses and a farm set that had been collected in individual pieces from Woolworths.

=== Later history ===
An exhibition of 'Royal and Historic Treasures' was held at the house from late June until the end of September 1939, in aid of the Heritage Craft Schools for Crippled Children in the Sussex town of Chailey. The exhibition was the initiative of Princess Alice, Countess of Athlone. The exhibition featured objects on loan from the British royal family, London livery companies and other public collections. Among the curios on display were a waistcoat worn by Christopher Wren at the opening of St. Paul's Cathedral, a sleeping bag owned by Antarctic explorer Lawrence Oates, Elizabeth I's petticoat, a table belonging to Marie Antoinette, and an artist's palette which was used by J. M. W. Turner. Queen Mary visited the exhibition on 10 July, accompanied by Mary, Princess Royal, Queen Victoria Eugenie of Spain, Alexander Cambridge, Earl of Athlone, Princess Helena Victoria, Princess Marie Louise, and Princess Alice. Sacha Votichenko performed on his tympanon royal for Queen Mary and her royal party.

The house was badly damaged during the London Blitz of World War II during an air raid on 7 October 1940. In 1942 the ruins of the house became the site of an allotment run by the Girls' Training Corps under the leadership of Lady Irene Haig.

In 1939 it was put up for rent, with a rental period expiring in 1975. The 1939 annual rent was estimated at £2,500 (equivalent to £141,284 in 2025). The lease on No. 145 was bought by Alexander Korda of London Films in March 1947. The adjoining house, No. 144 was the headquarters of the publicity department of London Films. Korda also leased No. 146 which he converted from a private house to offices.

It was demolished in 1959 as part of the development of the roads at Hyde Park Corner. In September 1969 the London Street Commune was established at the adjoining house, No. 144. In 1969 142, 143, 144, and 145 Piccadilly were owned on a leasehold tenure by Amalgamated West End Developments, a subsidiary of the Stock Conversion and Investment Trust. The InterContinental London Park Lane hotel was built in 1975 on the site of the house.
