= Naylor and Sale =

British architectural firm

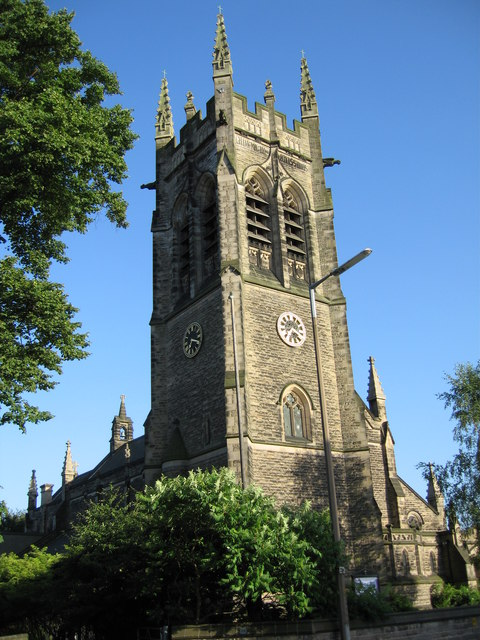
All Saints' Church, Burton upon Trent of 1905

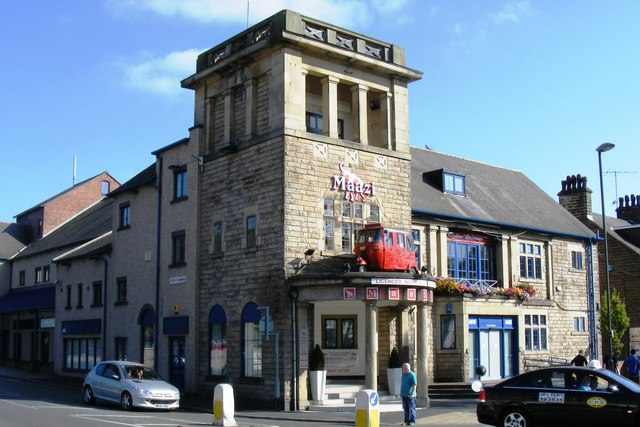
The Cinema House, Matlock 1922 (now Maazi restaurant)

Naylor and Sale was an architectural practice based in Derby between 1887 and 1923.

== History ==
John Reginald Naylor (1854 – 4 February 1923) was the son of a former vicar of St Peter and St Paul's Church, Upton, Nottinghamshire. He was articled to Mr. Townsend of Peterborough, and afterwards was a pupil in the office of George Gilbert Scott. He then worked for James Fowler in Louth, and commenced independent practice in Derby in 1878. In that year he took on Sale as an improver.

George Hansom Sale (1857 – 18 August 1954) had been articled to Frederick Josias Robinson in 1874 remaining with him until 1878. The partnership of Naylor and Sale was established in 1887.

The practice was involved in many church restorations in the East Midlands, and also worked for the Provincial Cinematograph Theatres Limited, in the erection of at least 14 of their theatres in different cities and towns.

John Reginald Naylor was elected an Associate of the Royal Institute of British Architects in 1881 and a fellow in 1894. In 1891 he was elected to Derby Town Council as a representative of Babington Ward.

The practice was dissolved on Naylor's death in 1923, and Sale formed a partnership with Joseph Alfred Woore, Charles H R Naylor and Bernard Widdows in Derby.

== Works ==
- St George Church, Barton In Fabis, Notts. 1885 to 1887, south aisle refurbish and re-pew
- St Michael's Church, Brimington 1891 new chancel
- St Michael's Church, Taddington 1891 restoration
- St Thomas' Church, Brampton 1888-91 new chancel
- The Round House (Alveston Hotel), London Road, Alvaston 1891
- 311 Burton Road, Derby 1895-98
- St Augustine's Church, Upper Dale Road, Normanton, Derby 1896-98
- St Giles Church, West Bridgford 1896-1911 restoration
- All Saints' Church, Bakewell 1897-98 new vestry
- St James' Church Glossop 1897 chancel enlarged
- Nos 127 & 129 Whitaker Road, Derby
- St Mary and St Barlock's Church, Norbury 1899-1900 restoration
- Byrkley Lodge extension and re-embellishment
- St John the Evangelist's Church, Hazelwood 1902 restoration
- All Saints, Burton upon Trent 1905
- Guildhall, Derby, 1906 alterations [Unexecuted]
- All Saints' Church, Bradbourne 1906-08 restoration
- St Michael's Church, Holbrook 1907-08 restoration
- The Picture House, Glasgow 1910-12
- Picture House, 105 New Street, Birmingham 1910
- Picture House, 7 Granby Street, Leicester 1910
- Picture House, Oxford Street and Chepstow Street, Manchester 1911
- The Picture House, Royal Avenue, Belfast 1911
- Rialto Cinema, 47 Briggate, Leeds 1911
- Arcade Cinema, St. Swithin's Street, Worcester 1911-12
- Picture House, 33 Long Row, Nottingham, 1912
- Picture House, 43 Coney Street, York 1914-15
- The Cinema House, Matlock 1922
- St Martin's Church Hall, Beaumont Fee, Lincoln. Constructed in brick in late Arts and Crafts style.
- Popular Cinema, Mill Street, Derby 1928
- Elite Cinema, High Street, Uttoxeter 1935
