= Forest Banks =

UK protected area

- Site of Special Scientific Interest
- Location within Staffordshire
- Location of Forest Banks.
- Area of search: Staffordshire
- Grid reference: SK 120284
- Coordinates: 52.852965°N 1.8232432°W
- Area: 112.7 acres (0.4561 km^{2}; 0.1761 sq mi)
- Notification date: 1968

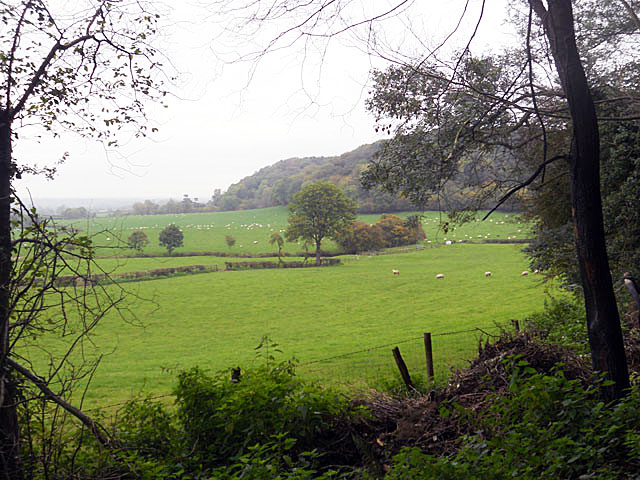
View towards Forest Banks woodland

Forest Banks is a Site of Special Scientific Interest (SSSI) in Staffordshire, England. It is located 3km southwest of Marchington. This protected area comprises three patches of woodland that are within a section of the former Royal Forest of Needwood. This area is protected because the steep slopes of the local topography allows a woodland assemblage that is otherwise uncommon in Staffordshire, and also for the diversity of moths and butterflies.

Forest Banks SSSI is cited within the Bagots Forest Plan (Bagot's Wood) written by the Forestry Commission.

== Biology ==
Forest Banks SSSI is particularly noteworthy for populations of small-leaved lime (Tilia cordata) and large-leaved lime (Tilia platyphyllos) coexisting. This site is one of the few localities for native hornbeam in the Midlands. Herbaceous species include bluebell, wood anemone, woodruff, opposite leaved golden-saxifrage and early-purple orchid (Orchis mascula). The parasitic plant called toothwort is also found in this protected area. Fern species include oak fern and soft shield fern.

The site supports a diversity of butterflies and moths including scorched wing (Plagodis dolabraria) and waved umber (Menophra abruptaria).

== Land ownership ==
Part of the land within Forest Banks SSSI is owned by the Duchy of Lancaster.
