= Listed buildings in Tatenhill =

Tatenhill is a civil parish in the district of East Staffordshire, Staffordshire, England. It contains 29 buildings that are recorded in the National Heritage List for England. Of these, three are listed at Grade II*, the middle grade, and the others are at Grade II, the lowest grade. The parish contains the villages of Tatenhill and Rangemore, and is otherwise rural. The listed buildings include a country house and associated structures, houses and associated buildings, cottages, farmhouses and farm buildings, two churches and associated structures, a public house, two mileposts, and a school.

== Key ==
Grade	Criteria
II*	Particularly important buildings of more than special interest
II	Buildings of national importance and special interest

== Buildings ==
Name and location	Photograph	Date	Notes	Grade
St Michael's Church; 52.79587°N 1.69673°W		13th century	The church was altered and extended in the 15th century, and restored in 1890 by G. F. Bodley. The church is built in sandstone with a tile roof, and consists of a nave, a chancel and a west tower. The tower has three stages, diagonal buttresses, and an embattled parapet.	II*
The Horseshoe; 52.79451°N 1.69836°W		17th century	A house, later a private house, it has a timber framed core, it was refaced in painted brick the 19th century, and it has a tile roof. There is one storey and an attic, and three bays. The windows are small-framed casements with segmental heads, and there is a gabled dormer. Inside the attic are exposed timber-framed trusses.	II
The Nook; 52.79775°N 1.69632°W	—	17th century	The house was refaced and extended in the 19th century. There is one storey and an attic, and a front of three bays, the right bay being later. The left two bays have a thatched roof, and the roof of the right bay is tiled. The doorway has a segmental head, to the right is a three-sided oriel window, and the other windows are casements. In the left two bays are eyebrow dormers, and in the right bay is a gabled dormer.	II
Crossroads Cottage; 52.79149°N 1.69948°W		Late 17th century	The cottage was altered and extended in the 19th and 20th centuries. It is timber framed, the infill and extensions are in brick, the roof is tiled, and there is one storey and an attic. On the front is a gabled porch, in the older part are oriel windows and a gabled dormer, and in the later part the windows are casements.	II
The Hawthorns; 52.79793°N 1.69676°W	—	Late 17th century	The cottage, which was altered and extended in the 19th and 20th centuries, is partly timber framed, and partly in brick, and has a tile roof. There is one storey and an attic, a front of two bays, and a single-storey single-bay extension on the right. To the right is a gabled porch, in the ground floor are two three-sided corbelled oriel windows, and above are two gabled dormers.	II
The Old Rectory; 52.79610°N 1.69676°W		Early 18th century	The rectory, later a private house, is in red brick with stone dressings, rusticated quoins, a moulded cornice, and a tile roof with verge parapets. It is in early Georgian style, and has two storeys and an attic, a double-pile plan, five bays, and a single-storey service wing to the north. The central doorway has fluted Doric pilasters, a rectangular fanlight, a frieze and a cornice. The windows are sashes with moulded cills and keystones, the window above the doorway has a moulded architrave, volutes at the foot, and an apron, and there are three pedimented dormers.	II*
Wall and gates, The Old Rectory; 52.79614°N 1.69690°W	—	Early 18th century	The wall along the frontage of the garden is in red brick with triangular coping, and is about 30 metres (98 ft) long and 1.2 metres (3 ft 11 in) high. The gate piers are in stone, about 1.7 metres (5 ft 7 in) high, and have pyramidal caps, and the gate is in timber.	II
Church House; 52.79556°N 1.69731°W	—	Late 18th century	A red brick house with painted stone dressings and a hipped tile roof. There are two storeys, an L-shaped plan, and a front of three bays. In the centre is a flat-roofed porch, the doorway has a fanlight, and the windows are sashes with lintels and incised keystones.	II
Dovecote, The Old Rectory; 52.79629°N 1.69655°W	—	Late 18th century (possible)	The dovecote is in red brick with corbelled eaves, a pyramidal tile roof, and a square plan. The landing stage has planted timber and a pyramidal tile cap, and the openings have Tudor arches.	II
Milepost at SK 173 243; 52.81618°N 1.74403°W		Early 19th century	The milepost is on the south side of the B5234 road. It is in cast iron and has a triangular plan and a sloping head. On the head is inscribed "ROLLESTON" and on the sides are the distances in miles to Newborough, Abbots Bromley, and Burton upon Trent.	II
Milepost at SK 189 239; 52.81289°N 1.72055°W		Early 19th century	The milepost is on the south side of the B5017 road. It is in cast iron and has a triangular plan and a sloping head. On the head is inscribed "ROLLESTON" and on the sides are the distances in miles to Marchington, Newborough, Abbots Bromley, and Burton upon Trent.	II
The Cedars; 52.79470°N 1.69986°W	—	Early 19th century	A red brick house with a slate roof, two storeys, a front of three bays, and adjoining rear wings. On the front is a flat-roofed porch, and a Tuscan doorcase. The windows are sashes, with painted keystone lintels.	II
Carriage shed, The Cedars; 52.79425°N 1.69926°W	—	Early 19th century	The carriage shed is in red brick with a hipped slate roof. It has a deep plan, and over the shed is a hayloft. On the front are double doors, and above is a segmental-headed opening.	II
Stable, The Cedars; 52.79447°N 1.69893°W	—	Early 19th century	The stable is in red brick with a hipped slate roof. It has a deep plan, and over it is a hayloft. On the front is a doorway, a small window, and above a larger window, all with segmental heads.	II
The Mill House; 52.79391°N 1.69666°W	—	Early 19th century	The house is in red brick with a tile roof, two storeys, a front of three bays, and a rendered wing to the left. The central doorway has a moulded surround and a cornice, and the windows are casements with painted wedge lintels.	II
Wall, gate piers and gates, All Saints Church; 52.80409°N 1.73366°W	—	Mid 19th century	The churchyard wall is in rusticated stone with pitched coping, and is about 1 metre (3 ft 3 in) high. There are three entrances, the north entrance has stubby gate piers with buttresses, and there are double gates.	II
Callingwood Hall; 52.80502°N 1.70521°W	—	Mid 19th century	The house, possibly with an earlier core, was altered and extended later in the 19th century. It is in rendered brick with a tile roof, and has two storeys. The earlier part is on a plinth, it has bands, four bays and an embattled parapet, and is flanked by octagonal turret-like pilasters. The windows are mullioned casements with Tudor arched heads. To the left is a later L-shaped wing with four bays, a projecting gable, and sash windows. To the rear is a single-storey porch with turret pilasters.	II
Railings and gate, St Michael's Church; 52.79589°N 1.69706°W		Mid 19th century	The railings form a frontage to the church. They are in cast iron, about 1.1 metres (3 ft 7 in) high and 35 metres (115 ft) long, and have a poppy-head pattern. The gates are in similar style.	II
School House to rear of Mill House; 52.79375°N 1.69652°W	—	Mid to late 19th century	The school house and coach house are in red brick with a tile roof, hipped to the right. There are two storeys and five bays. The building contains two elliptical coach arches, windows with pointed heads and Y-tracery, and other doors and windows with painted lintels.	II
All Saints Church; 52.80397°N 1.73366°W		1866–67	The church was designed by William Butterfield, the south aisle, again by Butterfield, was added in 1884–86, and in 1895 G. F. Bodley added the chancel. The church is built in stone with tile roofs, and consists of a nave, a north porch, a south aisle, a chancel with a south vestry, and a west steeple. The steeple has a tower with three stages, angle buttresses, a stair turret at the northeast, a clock face on the west side, and a top frieze of quatrefoils, and is surmounted by a broach spire with lucarnes.	II*
All Saints Primary School; 52.80388°N 1.73285°W		1873	The school is in red brick with stone dressings and a tile roof. The left part was the schoolmaster's house, with two storeys, the schoolroom to the right has one storey and an attic, and further to the right is a recessed wing. The house has a gable with patterned tiles in the apex and cusped bargeboards, and mullioned windows. The schoolroom has a triple lancet window in the ground floor, a gabled dormer above, and a bellcote on the gable. The entrance is in the angle, and is gabled with a Tudor arched doorway.	II
Needwood Manor and Water Tower; 52.80181°N 1.72152°W	—	1892	The house is in red brick with a hipped and gabled tile roof. There are two storeys, a projecting three-sided wing on the left, a central range of three bays, and to the right is a circular tower with three storeys, mock-machicolations under the top storey, dentilled eaves, and a conical roof. Some of the windows are sashes, some are casements, and there is an oriel window. The entrance has a Tudor arch. To the north is a three-stage water tower with a parapet and a flat roof. In the upper part are panels, and below are mock arrow slits and a Tudor arched doorway.	II
The Lawns; 52.79897°N 1.73805°W	—	1900	A country house, possibly with an earlier core, it is rendered with stone dressings, a balustraded parapet and a flat roof. It is loosely in Italianate style, mainly with three storeys and attics, and has a T-shaped plan. Features include quoins, giant pilasters, friezes, sash windows, some with pediments, and a water tower.	II
Fountains and pool, The Lawns; 52.79877°N 1.73759°W	—	c. 1900	The ornamental pool has a moulded stone kerb, and is square with apsidal ends. In the centre of each face is a fountain with putti in a bowl supported by a rodent on a rusticated base.	II
Gates, piers, walls and railings, The Lawns; 52.80081°N 1.73869°W		c. 1900	Flanking the entrance to the drive are two stone gate piers, each with panels, a cornice and lantern finial. Outside these are small piers, and brick quadrant walls containing brick piers with ball finials, between which are cast iron railings. The elaborate gates are in wrought iron.	II
Pair of game larders, The Lawns; 52.79993°N 1.73856°W	—	c. 1900	The game larders are in red brick with hipped slate roofs. They are identical, and each building has a single storey, an octagonal plan, a door and a window with segmental heads, a cupola with arched louvred openings, and octagonal rooflets with finials.	II
Soup kitchen, The Lawns; 52.79946°N 1.73859°W	—	c. 1900	The soup kitchen is in red brick with a pyramidal slate roof. There is a single storey and a square plan, and has a louvred cupola with a finial, and a doorway on the west side.	II
Stables, arch and railings, The Lawns; 52.79981°N 1.73936°W		c. 1900	The stables are in red brick with hipped slate roofs. They have two storeys and form three sides of a courtyard, open to the east, and contain coach entries, sash and casement windows. On the east side is a rendered entrance archway, with a central pedimented arch over which is an octagonal bellcote and clock, flanked by pedestrian arches. The archway is connected to the stables by cast iron railings on dwarf walls.	II
Steps, urns and ice houses, The Lawns; 52.79741°N 1.73832°W	—	c. 1900	At each end of an avenue is a pair of urns, there are steps at the south end and in the centre, and on each side of the avenue is an ice house. The urns have crests, festoons, and beaded feet, and the ice houses have brick vaults.	II
