= Bagot's Wood =

Coordinates: 52°50′43″N 1°53′17″W

Bagot's Wood is the largest extant piece of the ancient Needwood Forest, located near to Abbots Bromley, in Staffordshire, England. The forest derives its name from the Bagot family, seated for centuries at Blithfield Hall in Staffordshire.

The northeast edge of Bagot's wood, which forms part of what remains of the former Royal Forest of Needwood has been designated as the Forest Banks Site of Special Scientific Interest (SSSI).
