= Sacha Votichenko =

Russian American musician (1888–1971)

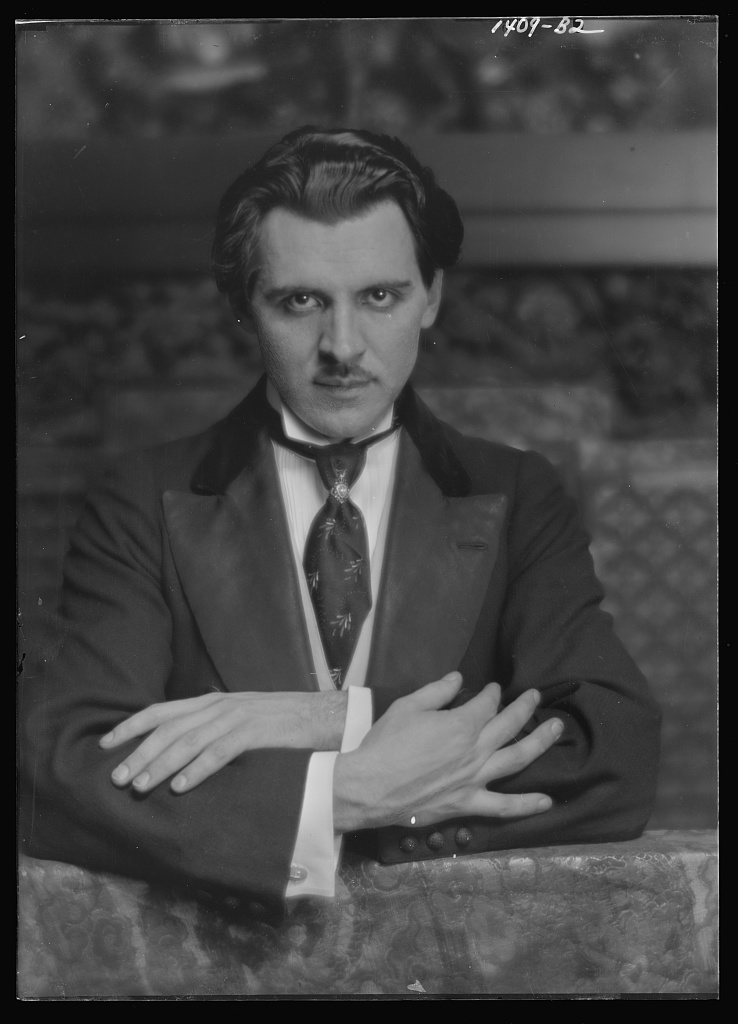
Votichenko in 1916

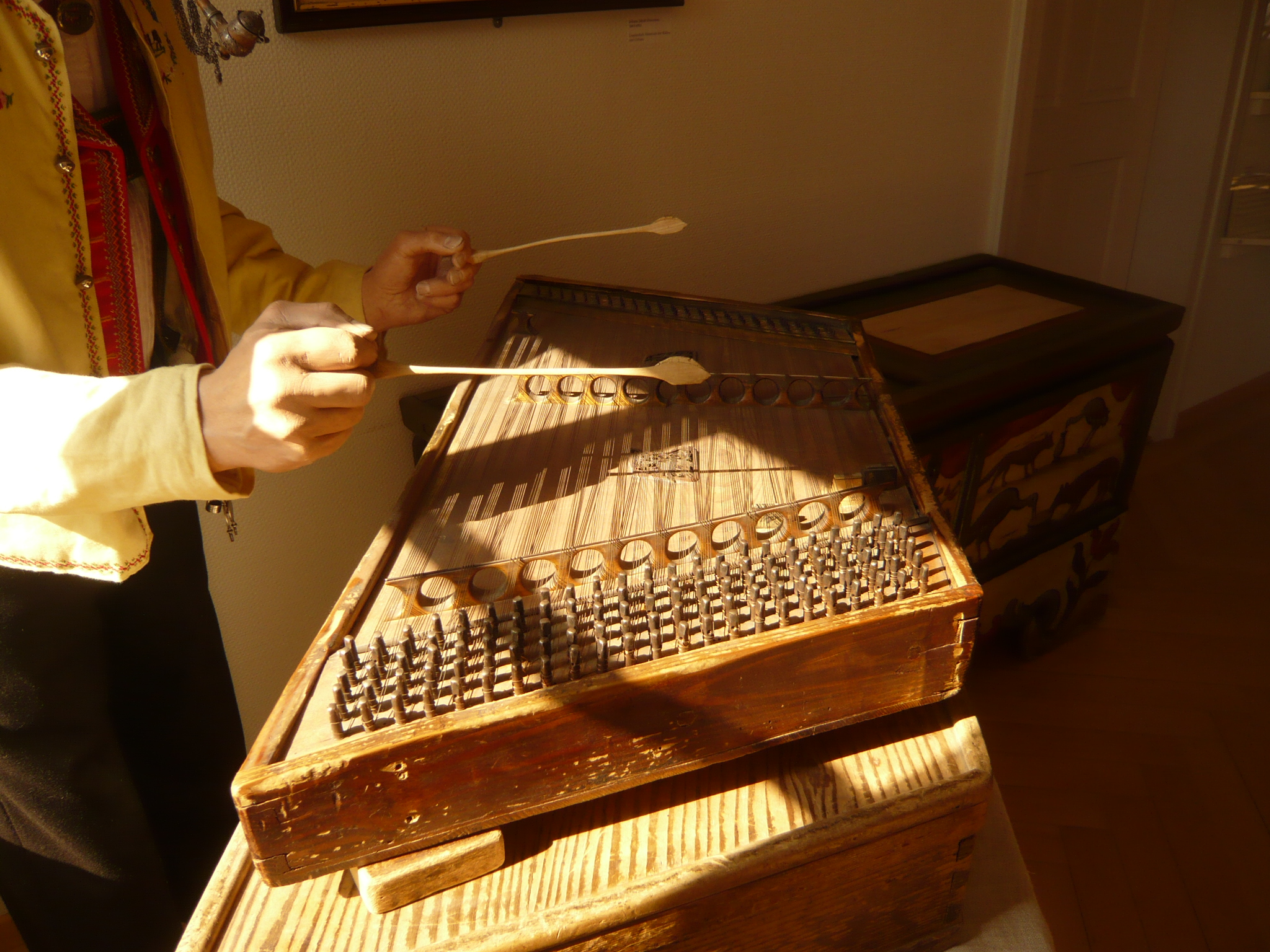
A tympanon

Sacha Votichenko (c.1888 – 22 October 1971) was a Russian musician of the tympanon, a French version of the hammered dulcimer.

Votichenko was born in c.1888. He was educated in England. He claimed to have first performed as a conductor at the age of 9, at the house of Leo Tolstoy. He played the 'Tympanon Royal' which dated from 1705, made by Pantaloon Hebenstreit for Louis XIV. Votichenko was a descendent of Hebenstreit. Votichenko recorded on Diamond Disc in 1920, it was never issued commercially. In the late 1910s Votichenko was a regular performer at the Hotel des Artistes in New York City. The Court Circular reported that and his wife dined with the Grand Duchess Xenia Alexandrovna of Russia, Princess Maria of Greece and Denmark, and her husband Rear Admiral Ioannides and Prince Dolgorouki at London's Hotel Cecil in June 1923.

He played his tympanon for Queen Mary and her royal guests during her visit to the exhibition of 'Royal and Historic Treasures' at 145 Piccadilly on 10 July 1939. He claimed to be the only soloist who had performed for three different British kings. Votichenko taught the tympanon in New York. In 1950 he said his life's ambition was to perform in the Sistine Chapel.

Votichenko died in Scottsdale, Arizona on 22 October 1971. He was survived by his son, Terry, and his three grandsons. Votichenko's great-grandson is the Phoenix underground DJ Alex Votichenko (known as Djentrification). The Votichenko family has an autographed photograph of Sacha Votichenko with Leo Tolstoy.

Votichenko wrote the Last Days of Imperial Russia, a symphony of seven movements. Maurice Ravel said to Votichenko that his "Bells of Moscow" made him "forget the 'Belles of Venice' ... Only for one moment, though".

Votichenko's correspondence with Ol'ga Tissarevskaia is preserved in Tissarevskaia's papers in the Museum of Russian Culture in San Francisco. A 1916 portrait photograph of Votichenko by Arnold Genthe is part of the Genthe Collection of the Library of Congress.
