= All Saints, Burton upon Trent =

Coordinates: 52.7933°N 1.6416°W

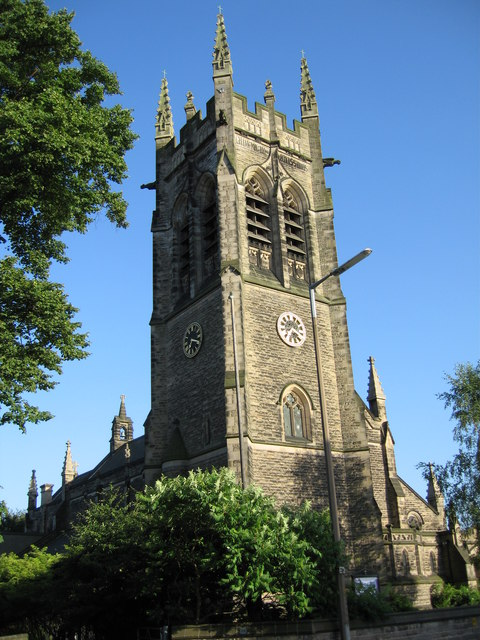
- "the church"
- All Saints, Burton upon Trent
- Denomination: Church of England

Administration
- Province: Province of Canterbury
- Diocese: Diocese of Lichfield

Clergy
- Vicar: Rev. Dave Collier

All Saints is a Church of England parish church in Burton upon Trent. It is part of the Diocese of Lichfield.

== History ==
The church was opened in 1905, designed by the architects Naylor and Sale of Derby.

All Saints' church (...) is executed in an Arts and Crafts Gothic style and has a grey, rock-faced exterior of Coxbench and Weldon stone and an interior of buff sandstone with pink Hollington stone dressings. It consists of a chancel with clergy and choir vestries to the north and organ chamber to the south, a nave with north and south aisles, a north-western tower above a porch, and a second, south-west porch linked by a narthex with a baptistry apse. (fn. 19) The nave, aisles, chancel, and chancel arch are very wide, and the five-bay arcades have octagonal piers and moulded capitals. The nave and chancel windows are in Arts and Crafts Decorated style, while those in the clerestory and in the tower are in Arts and Crafts Perpendicular. Only the east window has coloured glass. The nave has a modified hammer-beam roof with tiebeams and kingposts.

The church retains virtually all its Arts and Crafts Gothic furnishings, including an ambo formed by a low serpentine marble cancelli screen with a pulpit and reading desk at either end, choir stalls, organ case, font, and some pews. The chancel floor is of inlaid white, green, and red marble.

The west end of the nave was screened off to make a parish room in 1982 by Duvall, Brownhill of Lichfield, using timber taken from the pews formerly at the west end of the nave, and the font was moved from its original position at the west end of the nave to the east end of the south aisle.

A single bell was placed in the tower in 1905. The tower, however, was designed to accommodate a peal of eight bells, and in 1947 a 'victory peal' of five additional bells, donated by Sir William Bass and others, was installed as a war memorial.

== Organ ==
The church had a pipe organ installed by the builder Peter Conacher. A specification of the organ can be found on the National Pipe Organ Register.
