= Nellie Lisa Melles, 2nd Baroness Burton =

British peeress (1873–1962)

The Right Honourable The Lady Burton
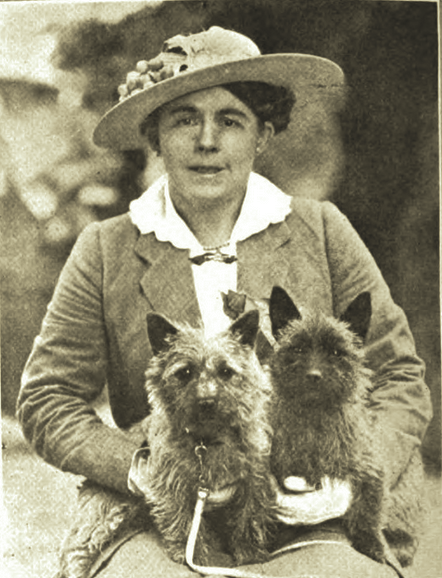
- Lady Burton in 1916
- Born: Nellie Lisa Bass; 27 December 1873; Rangemore, England
- Died: 28 May 1962 (aged 88)
- Spouse(s): James Evan Bruce Baillie (1894-1931; his death); William Eugene Melles (d. 1953)
- Children: 3
- Parents: Michael Bass, 1st Baron Burton (father); Harriett Georgina Thornewill (mother)
- Family: Bass family

Nellie Lisa Melles, 2nd Baroness Burton (née Bass, formerly Baillie; 27 December 1873 – 28 May 1962) was a British heiress and art collector. She succeeded her father as the second Baron Burton.

== Early life and family ==
Lady Burton was born Nellie Lisa Bass on 27 December 1873 in Rangemore to Michael Bass, a brewer and Liberal politician, and Harriett Georgina Thronewill, an heiress of the Thornewill and Warham company. Lady Burton's grandfather, Michael Thomas Bass, served in the British Parliament. Her great-great grandfather, William Bass, founded Bass Brewery. Her father was created a baronet, of Stafford in the County of Stafford, by Queen Victoria in 1882. In 1886, he was created the first Baron Burton.

== Adult life ==
In 1894, she married Colonel James Evan Bruce Baillie, of Dochfour in Inverness-shire, with whom she had three children. Upon her first marriage, she received a gold snuff box from the Prince George, Duke of Cambridge. Her husband died in 1931. She married a second time to Major William Eugene Melles. Her second husband died in 1953.

As her father had no sons, Lady Burton succeeded her father, as a hereditary peeress by virtue of a special remainder from 1897, as the second Baron Burton in 1909. She and her mother lived in Grosvenor Square following her father's death.

She was an art collector and consigned woven tapestries from 1760 and 1783 that were designed by Jean-François de Troy. She also owned two sculptures, of a nymph and of cupid, designed by Étienne-Maurice Falconet.

She sold Chesterfield House to Henry Lascelles, Viscount Lascelles in 1919 and Rangemore Hall to the Staffordshire County Council in 1949.

Lady Burton died in 1962. Her son, Brigadier George Evan Michael Baillie, was killed during World War II, leaving her to be succeeded to the barony by her grandson, Michael Baillie, 3rd Baron Burton.
