= RAF Tatenhill =

Former RAF station in Staffordshire, England

RAF Tatenhill
- Tatenhill, Staffordshire in England

Site information
- Type: Royal Air Force satellite station
- Owner: Air Ministry
- Operator: Royal Air Force
- Controlled by: RAF Bomber Command

Location
- Shown within Staffordshire RAF Tatenhill (the United Kingdom)
- Coordinates: 52°48′53″N 001°45′40″W

Site history
- Built: 1941
- In use: 1941 - 1947
- Battles/wars: European theatre of World War II

Airfield information
- Elevation: 134 metres (440 ft) AMSL
Runways
Direction	Length and surface
04/22	Concrete
08/26	Concrete
18/36	Concrete

Royal Air Force Tatenhill or more simply RAF Tatenhill is a former Royal Air Force satellite station in Tatenhill, Staffordshire, England, 4 NM (7.4 km; 4.6 mi) west of Burton on Trent. It was originally known as RAF Crossplains.

== History ==
The field was built in 1941 as a satellite for No. 27 Operational Training Unit RAF (OTU) at RAF Lichfield later becoming a satellite airfield for RAF Wheaton Aston. The design was the wartime RAF standard of three co-intersecting runways, east-west, north-south diagonal. The east-west runway was the only one suitable to safely accommodate bomber take off and landings (1,600 yards (1,500 m)) which hampered its operability.

It was used as a bomber crew training field, which continued in varied training functions until 1944 with Vickers Wellington, Airspeed Oxford and Avro Anson aircraft for RAF Bomber Command. Later a single engine training unit arrived using the Miles Master aircraft. It was then used by the RAF School of Explosives after the disastrous explosion at nearby RAF Fauld, from October 1945 until January 1947. During the post Second World War period when it was still under RAF Control, RAF Tatenhill was used to break up unused and unwanted ammunition before it was dumped at sea.

The airfield had a bomb dump on the south-east side and a number of frying pan dispersals were built on land to the north of the B5234 road, with hangars in this area too.

== Current use ==
The airfield remains in use as Tatenhill Airfield. A wartime Bellman hangar remains in use as of 2013.
