= Byrkley Lodge =

Coordinates: 52.8087°N 1.7558°W

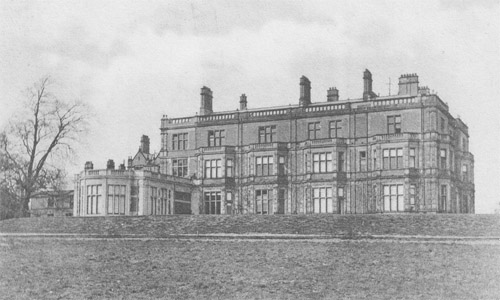
Byrkley Lodge, before demolition in 1952

Byrkley Lodge was a country house and later racing horse stud farm, located close to Burton on Trent, Staffordshire. Demolished in 1953, its former grounds are today the site of the St George's Park National Football Centre.

== Byrkley Park ==
The lands were originally part of Needwood Forest, owned by the Berkeley family of Berkeley Castle in Gloucestershire. The forest was the home to extensive stocks of wolf, wild boar and fallow deer.

In the 13th century Thomas de Berkeley was assigned to be the keeper of the Tutbury ward, and while resident at Tutbury Castle liked to hunt the forest, and had a hunting lodge built. In 1267, Thomas married the daughter of William de Ferrers, the Earl of Derby.

During the rebellion of Simon de Montfort, 6th Earl of Leicester against King Henry III, the de Ferrers family allied themselves with the rebellion. After the rebellion was put down, the de Ferrers were forced to forfeit their estates to the crown. Henry III gave the forest to his son Edmund Crouchback, 1st Earl of Lancaster, in 1266. Renamed Needwood Chase or royal forest, it was subsequently owned by the Duchy of Lancaster until it passed into the possession of Henry IV in 1399.

By this time the lodge had become the residence of the local keeper (judge). The lodge was redeveloped by King Edward IV, and used extensively for hunting by both him and King James I.

== Byrkley Lodge ==
By the start of the 18th century, Needwood Forest had been harvested for its timber, and extensively redeveloped as pasture. In 1750 Field Marshal George Townshend, the first Marquess Townshend, had married Lady Charlotte Compton, who had inherited Tamworth Castle and therefore succeeded to the de Ferrers barony. As it had become fashionable to have a solitary retreat, in 1754 Lord Townshend subsequently acquired the leasehold of what was now known as Byrkley Lodge, which he rebuilt as a weekend hunting lodge. By 1775, the only buildings on the former Needwood Forest plateau were Byrkley Lodge, Yoxall Lodge to the south, and Hanbury Park Farm 3 miles north.

In 1786, Arthur Chichester, the 1st Marquess of Donegall bought the lodge from Lord Townshend, including his collection of water colour paintings. During his residence, the Marquis began introducing albino rabbits to the grounds, which by the time he died in 1799 had become naturally wild. By this time Richard Lovell Edgeworth had acquired Yoxall Lodge, and the second and third of his four wives were both sisters of Rear Admiral Edward Sneyd Clay. Through this association the lodge was eventually acquired by Sneyd, on whose death in 1846 it passed to his only daughter, Emma.

Emma Sneyd had attended the wedding of her close friend, the son of Thomas Gisborne of Yoxall Lodge, who married Mary, the daughter of brewer Michael Thomas Bass, Sr. In 1850, Emma agreed to rent Byrkley Lodge to Mary's brother, Michael Thomas Bass, Jr. Sneyd placed extensive conditions within the lease for the upkeep of the grounds, to which the Bass family during its residence added that hunting or capture of the albino rabbits was strictly forbidden.

On Bass's death, the estate passed to his son Hamar Alfred Bass, who after rebuilding the main house between 1887 and 1891, founded a racing horse stud within the extensive grounds. The Byrkley Stud produced and trained "Love Wisely" which won the Ascot Gold Cup in 1896. Bass was also for 12 years master of the Meynell Hunt.

On the death of Hamar in April 1898, the estate passed to his son, Sir William Bass, 2nd Baronet. Known as Billy Bass, he was most noted for his ownership of racehorses. He was a member and steward of the Jockey Club, on the National Hunt committee, and joint Master of the Royal Hunt. His stable enjoyed his first success in the Cesarewitch Handicap in 1903 with Grey Tick, and he also owned the horses Rosedrop, Cyllene and Sceptre. He was a Steward of the Pony Turf Club and was involved in the foundation of Northolt Park Racecourse in 1929.

Sir William married Lady (Wilmot Ida) Noreen Hastings (1880–1949), second daughter of the 14th Earl of Huntingdon and a notable sportswoman, in 1903. Lady Noreen Bass was noted for snubbing Winston Churchill's mother Mrs George Cornwallis-West at Newmarket races in 1909.

== Demolition ==
Billy Bass died in 1952, without having any children, leading to the extinction of the baronetcy. He left his fortune to his wife's nephew, the trainer Peter Hastings (d. 1964) who changed his name to Hastings-Bass. Peter's eldest son William Edward Robin Hood Hastings-Bass (b. 1948) is the present and 17th Earl of Huntingdon.

The estate was sold off in 1952, shortly after which the main house was demolished. The Byrkley Stud survived for some time, but was also later demolished.

== Present ==
The former 330-acre (130 ha) of the Byrkley Lodge estate were acquired by the Football Association in 2001. After investing £105M, on 9 October 2012 the Duke and Duchess of Cambridge opened the St George's Park National Football Centre. The centre is the base for all coaching and development work undertaken by the FA, and the training and preparation ground for all of the England national football teams.
