= Pony Turf Club =

The Pony Turf Club was a body which regulated the racing of horses of under 15 hands in the United Kingdom from its foundation in 1923 until the early 1950s.

The club was founded by Major R G Alexander, and was officially recognised by the Jockey Club in 1924 following the support of Lord Derby. The Stewards by 1929 included The Earl of Carnarvon, Sir William Bass and Viscount Lascelles.

In 1929, a dedicated racetrack was opened in Northolt, Middlesex and during the 1930s pony races are recorded as being held throughout the South West of England, as well as at Portsmouth Park (Paulsgrove), Worthing, Chelmsford, Southend, Sketty Park near Swansea and Lilleshall Hall, Shropshire.. Racing ceased at Northolt in 1940 and the racecourse in controversial circumstances did not reopen after the War.

In 1947 after a lapse of nearly seven years PTC racing restarted at the former National Hunt racecourses at Hawthorn Hill, Maidenhead, Berkshire and Shirley in the West Midlands. Further investment was made in a track at Mallory Park, near Kirkby Mallory, Leicestershire, although this was never completed and the site was put to other uses . Racing briefly prospered and in 1949 the former jumping courses of Colwall Park and Newport joined the circuit. That year over sixty fixtures were planned at five venues; there were then over sixty training stables, nearly seventy jockeys and a further twenty licensed apprentices. The 60 ponies registered to race in March 1947 had increased in the following two years to nearly 600.

Lack of finance, however, had always been the sport's problem. Mallory Park never opened and Colwall Park and Newport did not race again after that year. As the number of ponies in training rapidly decreased so did the number of spectators. Hawthorn Hill held its last meeting in October 1951 to nearly empty stands. Shirley Park soldiered on up to November 1953. The Stewards of the Pony Turf Club announced there would be no further meetings the following January and the Club itself formally went into liquidation in 1956.

In the early 1960s, the Pony Racing Society was founded and held a few meetings; it was not recognised by the Jockey Club and soon failed.

In the early 60s the track was purchased by Sidney Barnett (my father), Rosser Chinn, and Morry and John Lipton. They ran a few races for two or three years then they sold the land to the Cadbury family and it was developed.
