= Tatenhill =

Village in Staffordshire, England

Coordinates: 52.795°N 1.699°W

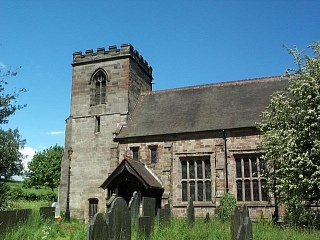
- St Michael and All Angels Parish Church

- Location within Staffordshire
- Population: 762 (2011)
- OS grid reference: SK204220
- District: East Staffordshire
- Shire county: Staffordshire
- Region: West Midlands
- Country: England
- Sovereign state: United Kingdom
- Post town: BURTON-ON-TRENT
- Postcode district: DE13
- Dialling code: 01283
- Police: Staffordshire
- Fire: Staffordshire
- Ambulance: West Midlands
- UK Parliament: Burton

Tatenhill is a village and civil parish in the East Staffordshire district of Staffordshire, England. It is in a deep valley, between two hills that gradually descend from the eastern border of the Needwood Forest, and is 4 miles (6.4 km) west-southwest of Burton upon Trent.

== Buildings ==
The sandstone Parish Church of St. Michael is a 13th-century building which was substantially enlarged and altered in the 15th century. Around 1890, Bodley restored the church. It is a Grade II* listed building.

Beside the church stands the Old Rectory which was built in the early 18th century (1704 has been found written on the plaster inside the house) for William Binckes, Dean of Lichfield. Noted for its fine Georgian architecture is also a Grade II* listed building. In 2008, this house was one of four finalists in the "England's Finest Parsonage" contest featured in Country Life (magazine).

RAF Tatenhill is an old World War II airfield, still in use for light aircraft as Tatenhill Airfield. On 16 December 2007, there was a light aircraft collision involving an aircraft from Tatenhill.

== Notable people ==
- Hadrian a Saravia (1531–1612) Rector of Tatenhill from 1588. A renowned theologian after his move to Canterbury he was involved in the writing of the King James Bible
- Brutus Babington (1558–1611) Rector of Tatenhill from 1602 and became the Church of Ireland Bishop of Derry.
- Charles Abraham (1814–1903) Rector of Tatenhill 1875-6 having been the first Anglican Bishop of Wellington.

== See also ==
- Listed buildings in Tatenhill
