= Needwood Forest =

Ancient forest in England

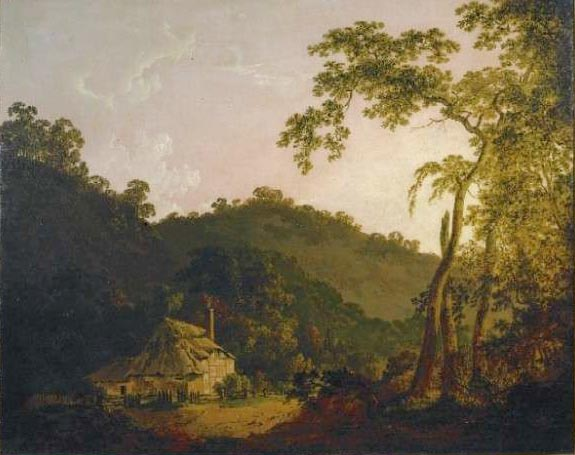
- A Cottage in Needwood Forest by Joseph Wright 1790
- Interactive map of Needwood Forest
- Type: Woodland
- Location: Staffordshire
- Coordinates: 52.81°N 1.76°W
- Area: 9,437 acres (38.19 km^{2})
- Created: 1266
- Status: Some parts remain

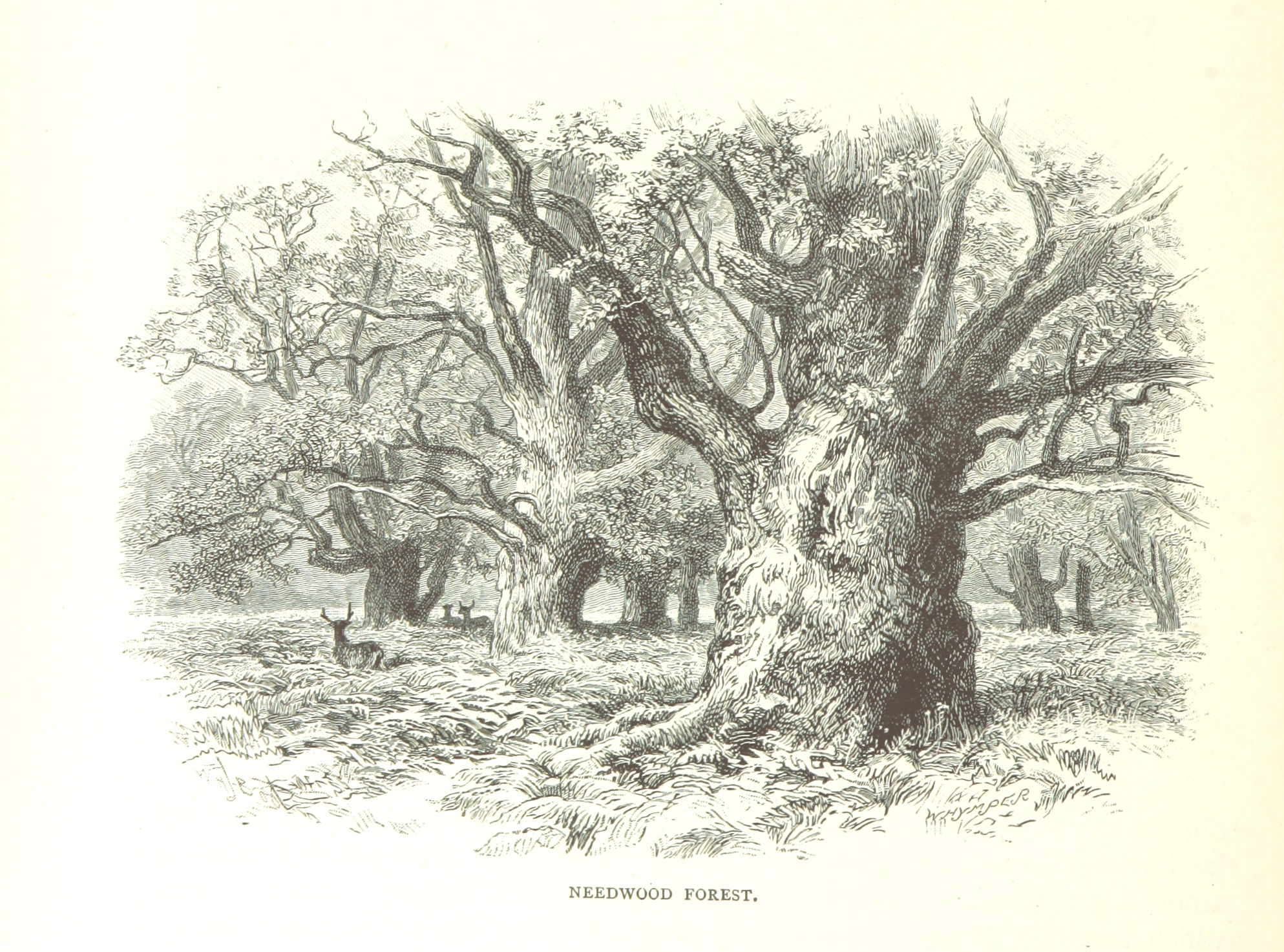
Book illustration of trees in Needwood Forest, 1889

Needwood Forest was a large area of ancient woodland in Staffordshire, England, which was largely lost at the end of the 18th century.

== History ==
The forest was on extensive lands owned by the Berkeley family of Berkeley Castle in Gloucestershire. The forest was home to extensive stocks of wild boar and fallow deer.

In the 13th century, Thomas de Berkeley was assigned to be the keeper of the Tutbury ward, and while resident at Tutbury Castle liked to hunt the forest. He had a hunting lodge built, Byrkley Lodge. In 1267, Thomas married the daughter of William de Ferrers, the Earl of Derby.

During the rebellion of Simon de Montford against King Henry III, the de Ferrers family allied themselves with the rebellion. After the rebellion was put down, the de Ferrers were forced to forfeit their estates to the crown. Henry III gave the forest to his son Edmund Crouchback, 1st Earl of Lancaster, in 1266. His son Thomas, 2nd Earl of Lancaster died childless in 1322, and thus the wood passed to the King. Renamed Needwood Chase or royal forest, it was subsequently owned by the Duchy of Lancaster until it passed into the possession of Henry IV in 1399.

By this time the lodge had become the residence of the local keeper (judge). The lodge was redeveloped by King Edward IV, and used extensively for hunting by both himself and King James I. It was during this period that the forest became commonly associated with Sir Gawain's Green Knight.

== Enclosure and deforestation ==
In 1776, Francis Noel Clarke Mundy privately published a book of poetry called Needwood Forest which contained his own poem of the same name and supportive contributions from Sir Brooke Boothby Bt., Erasmus Darwin and Anna Seward. The purpose of Mundy's poems was to resist calls for the enclosure of the forest. Seward wrote a poem called "The fall of Needwood Forest", which she regarded as "one of the most beautiful local poems". Seward's parents adopted Honora Sneyd Edgeworth, who was probably related to the engraver, Mary Emma Sneyd. By the early 1790s, Thomas Gisborne held the perpetual curacy of Barton-under-Needwood. Gisborne regarded Needwood much as Gilbert White did Selborne, and wrote of his walks in the forest to resist enclosure.

Needwood Forest or Chase Inclosure Act 1801
- Act of Parliament
- Parliament of the United Kingdom
- Long title: An act for dividing; allotting and inclosing the forest or chase of Needwood, in the county of Stafford.
- Citation: 41 Geo. 3. (U.K.) c. lvi
- Territorial extent: United Kingdom

Dates
- Royal assent: 20 June 1801
- Commencement: 20 June 1801 (Note: The Acts of Parliament (Commencement) Act 1793.)
Other legislation
Relates to	Duchy of Lancaster Act 1695

However, an act of Parliament, the Needwood Forest or Chase Inclosure Act 1801 (41 Geo. 3. (U.K.) c. lvi) was passed, allowing the Forestry Commissioners to enclose the lands and deforest it. By 1811 the land had been divided amongst a number of claimants. By 1851 Needwood Forest was described as forming "one of the most beautiful and highly cultivated territories in the honour of Tutbury, which contains 9,437 acres (38.19 km^{2}) of land, in the five parishes of Hanbury, Tutbury, Tatenhill, Yoxall, and Rolleston, and subdivided into the four wards of Tutbury, Barton, Marchington, and Yoxall, which together form a district of over seven miles (11 km) in length and three in breadth, extending northwards from Wichnor to Marchington Woodlands."

== Present ==
The name lives on in the village and civil parish of Barton-under-Needwood, south of the former forest; and the hamlet of Needwood, in Anslow and Tatenhill parishes.

The former forest area now encloses some twenty farms, on which dairy farming is the principal enterprise. Byrkley Lodge was demolished in 1953, and today its former grounds are the site of the English National Football Centre, St George's Park.

490 acres (2.0 km^{2}) of woodland remain, with some parts still open to the public. Jackson Bank at Hoar Cross is a mature, mixed 80-acre (320,000 m^{2}) woodland still owned by the Duchy of Lancaster, which is open to the public. Bagot's Wood near Abbots Bromley claims to be the largest remaining part of the forest.

The National Forest is an environmental project planned to link the ancient forests of Needwood and Charnwood. Portions of Leicestershire, Derbyshire and Staffordshire are being planted, in an attempt to create a 200 square miles (520 km^{2}) area blending ancient woodland with new plantings to create a new national forest.
