= Michael Bass, 1st Baron Burton =

British politician (1837–1909)

Michael Arthur Bass 1st Baron Burton
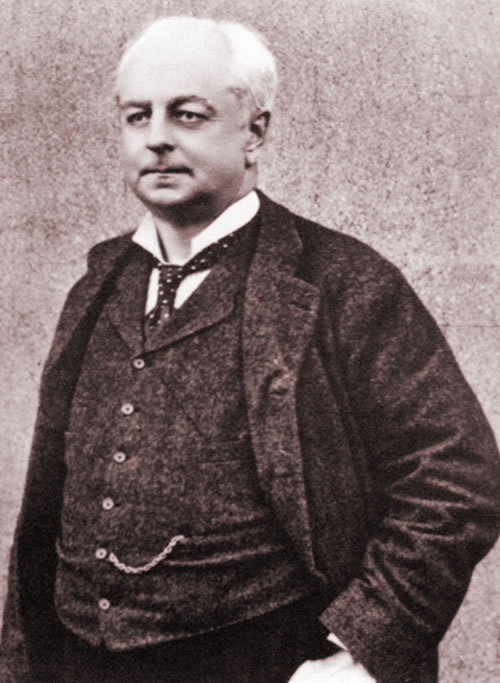
- Born: 12 November 1837; Burton upon Trent
- Died: 1 February 1909 (aged 71); London, Britain
- Occupations: Politician and Brewer
- Children: Nellie Lisa Melles, 2nd Baroness Burton
- Parents: Michael Thomas Bass; Eliza Jane
- Relatives: Hamar Alfred Bass (brother); Emily Bass; Alice Bass

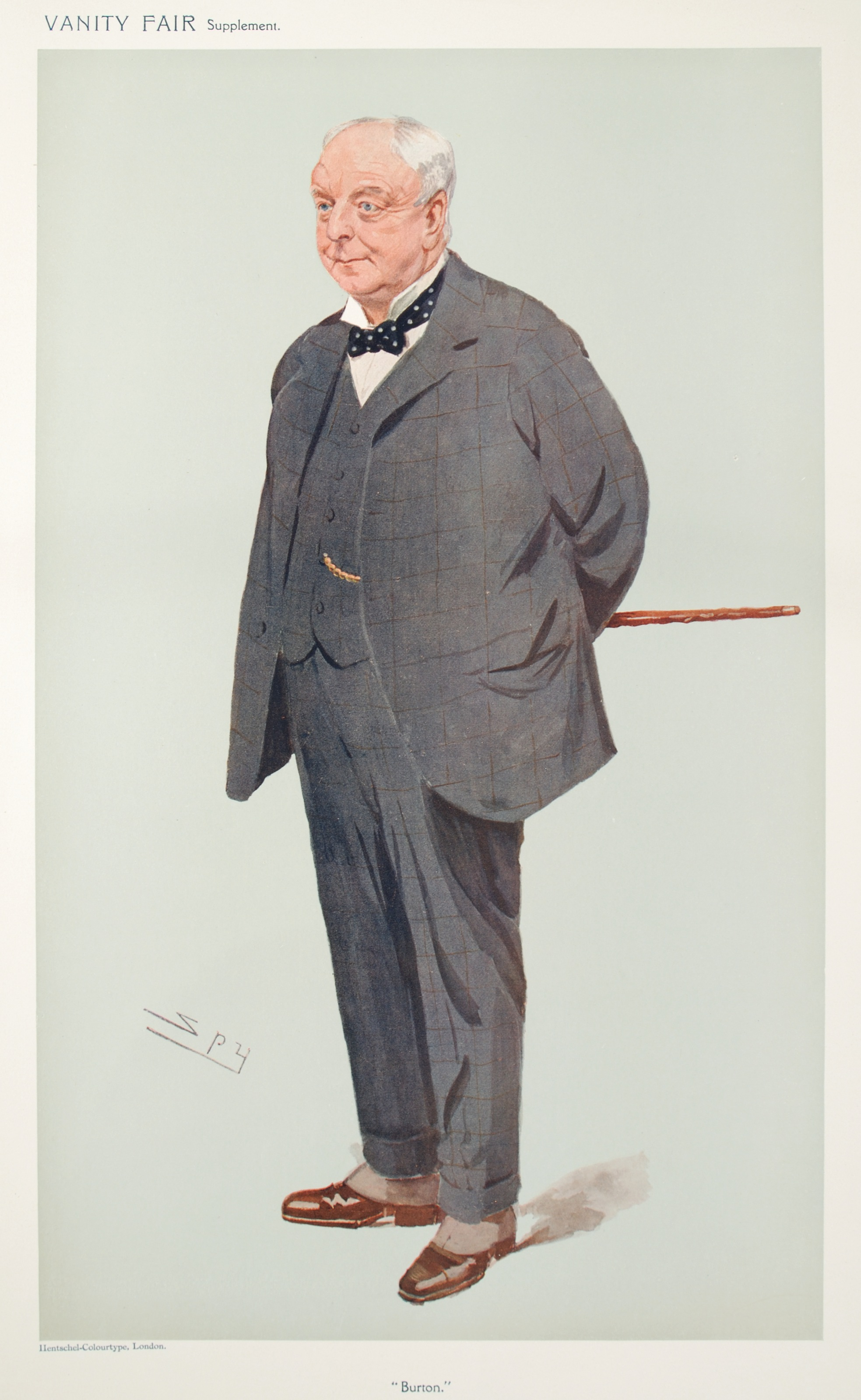
As depicted by "Spy" (Leslie Ward) in Vanity Fair, November 1908

Michael Arthur Bass, 1st Baron Burton, KCVO (12 November 1837 – 1 February 1909), known as Sir Michael Arthur Bass, 1st Baronet, from 1882 to 1886, was a British brewer, Liberal politician and philanthropist. He sat in the House of Commons from 1865 to 1886 when he was raised to the peerage as Baron Burton.

== Early life ==
Bass was born at Burton upon Trent, the elder son of Michael Thomas Bass and the great-grandson of William Bass, the founder of the brewery firm of Bass & Co in Burton who moved there from London in 1777. His mother was Eliza Jane, daughter of Samuel Arden. He had a younger brother, Hamar Alfred Bass, and two sisters.

Bass was educated at Burton Grammar School, Harrow and Trinity College, Cambridge.

== Career ==
Bass became a Director of the family firm of Bass, Ratcliff, Gretton and Co from 1863, and Chairman of the Directors upon his father's death in 1884.

He served as a Member of Parliament for Stafford from 1865 to 1868, East Staffordshire from 1868 to 1885 and for Burton from 1885 to 1886. As a brewer, it was uncomfortable to be a Liberal MP as there was a strong temperance element to the Liberal Party at the time.

In 1882, he was made a Baronet of Stafford in the County of Stafford, chiefly in honour of his father, who was still alive at the time and who had declined every honour offered to him. The title remainder to his brother Hamar Alfred Bass.

Four years later, in 1886, he received a second title as Baron Burton, of Rangemore and of Burton-on-Trent in the County of Stafford, with remainder to male heirs.

In 1897, he was made Baron Burton, of Burton-on-Trent and of Rangemore in the County of Stafford, with remainder, in default of male issue, to his daughter and her male issue.

In 1904, he was further honoured when he was made a Knight Commander of the Royal Victorian Order.

== Philanthropy and legacy ==
The Bass family seat was at Rangemore near Burton. King Edward VII visited Rangemore, the town and Bass Brewery in February 1902. It was Michael who got involved in creating the Stapenhill viaduct including a 120 ft cast iron suspension bridge, which was seen as an act of practical philanthropy, for the workers for when the river flooded it allowed the workers to still reach work via the canal.

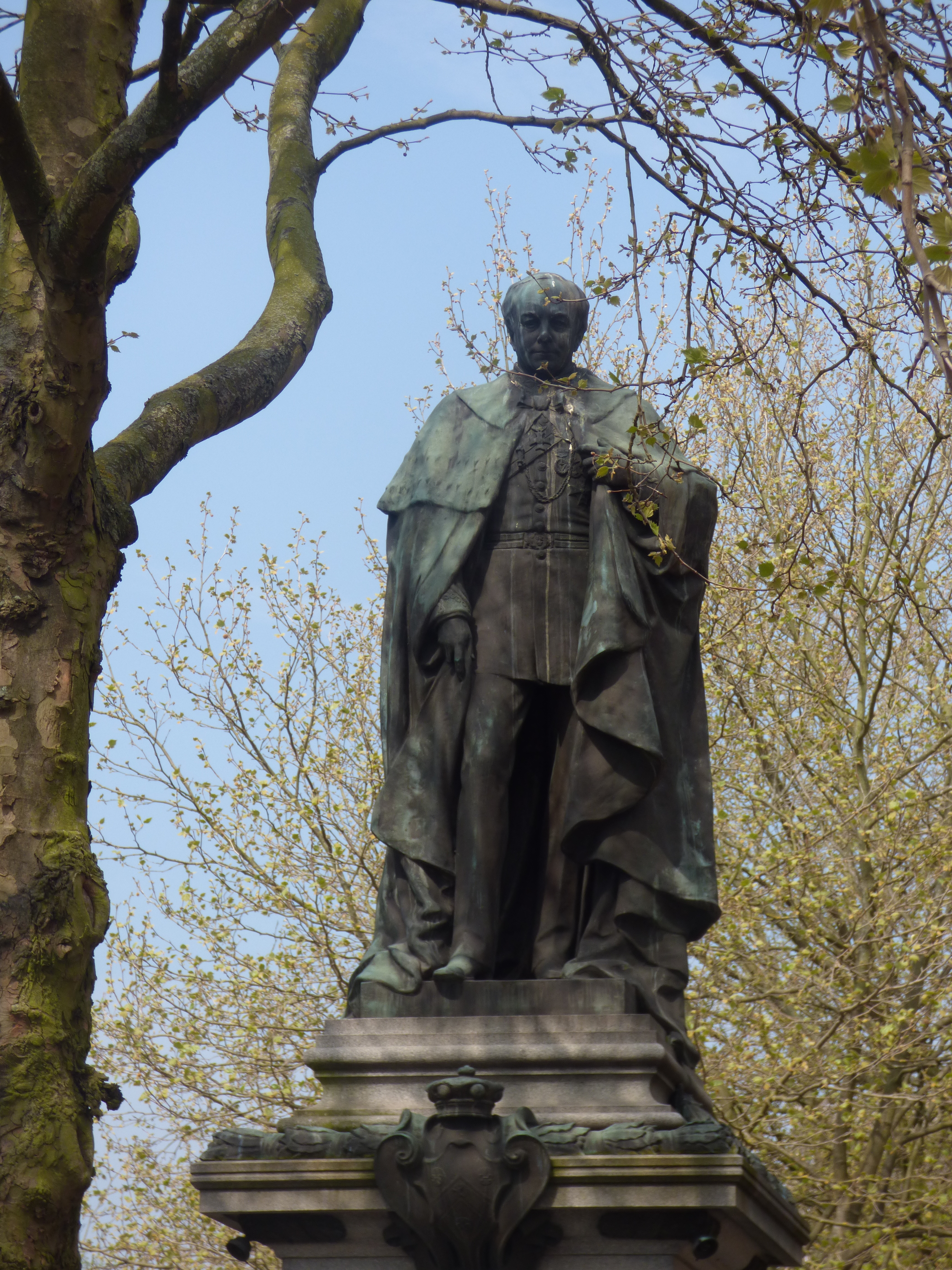
Statue of Bass outside Burton upon Trent Town Hall

Like his father, Michael Arthur Bass was a generous benefactor to Burton, making many fine contributions to the town, including the Ferry Bridge, Burton, the St Paul's Institute and Liberal Club (now the Town Hall) and St Chad's Church.

Bass died in London in February 1909, aged 71. His nephew, William, inherited the baronetcy of Stafford under the special remainder. The 1886 Barony of Rangemore and of Burton-on-Trent became extinct, as Bass had no male heirs. However, the 1897 Barony was inherited by his daughter, Nellie Lisa, in accordance with its special remainder.

A bronze statue of Lord Burton, sculpted by F. W. Pomeroy, was erected in front of Burton upon Trent Town Hall in 1911.

== Family life ==
Lord Burton married Harriett Georgina, daughter of Edward Thornewill (one of the family behind the Thornewill engineering company in Burton), in 1869. They had one daughter, Nellie Lisa Melles (née Bass). After Bass's death, the widowed Lady Burton lived with her daughter in Grosvenor Square. She died in 1931.

== See also ==
- Beerage

Parliament of the United Kingdom
Preceded by Thomas Salt; Thomas Sidney	Member of Parliament for Stafford; 1865–1868; With: Walter Meller	Succeeded by Walter Meller; Henry Pochin
New constituency	Member of Parliament for Staffordshire East; 1868–1885; With: John Robinson McClean 1868–1873; Samuel Allsopp 1873–1880; Henry Wiggin 1880–1885	Constituency abolished
New constituency	Member of Parliament for Burton; 1885–1886	Succeeded by Sydney Evershed
Peerage of the United Kingdom
New creation	Baron Burton (of Rangemore and of Burton-on-Trent); 1886–1909	Extinct
New creation	Baron Burton (of Burton-on-Trent and of Rangemore); 1897–1909	Succeeded by Nellie Melles
Baronetage of the United Kingdom
New creation	Baronet (of Stafford); 1882–1909	Succeeded by William Bass
