= Baron Burton =

Extinct barony in the Peerage of the United Kingdom

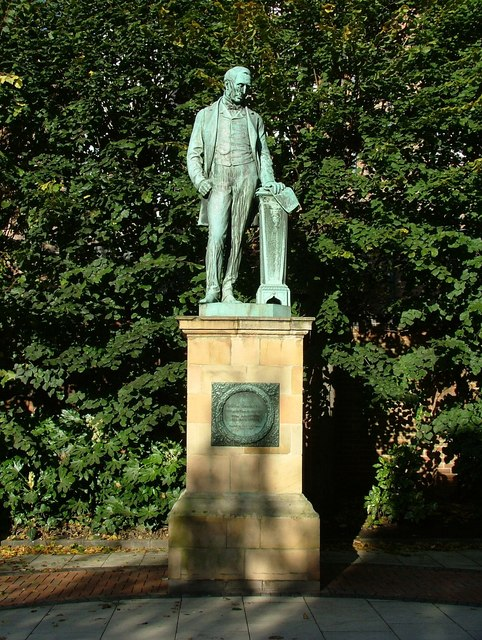
Statue of Michael Thomas Bass

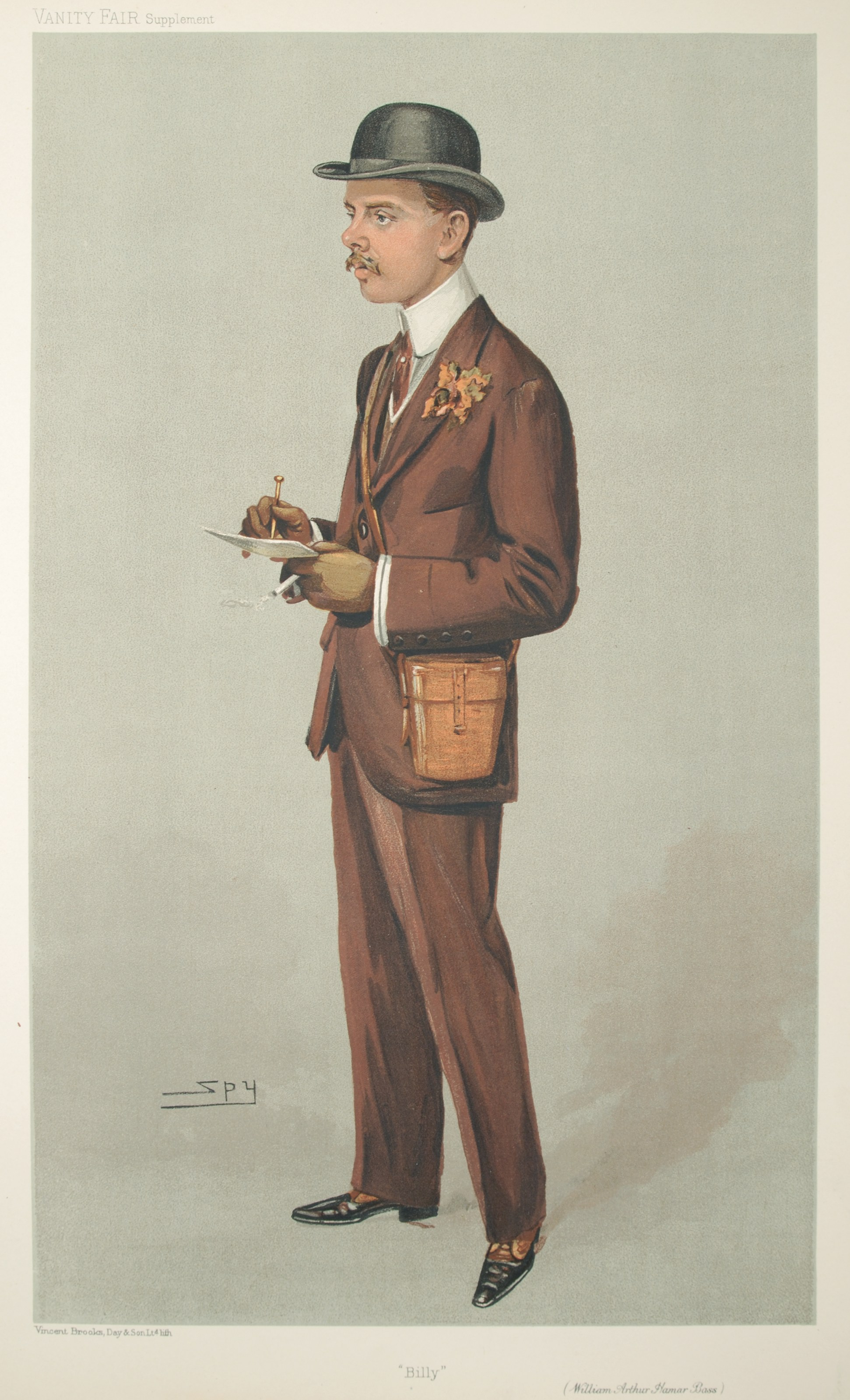
Bass caricatured by Spy for Vanity Fair, 1905

Baron Burton, of Burton-on-Trent and of Rangemore in the County of Stafford, is a title in the Peerage of the United Kingdom. It was created in 1897 for the prominent brewer, philanthropist and Liberal politician Michael Bass, 1st Baron Burton. He had already been created a baronet in 1882 and Baron Burton in 1886. However, the three titles had different remainders. The Bass family descended from William Bass, who founded the brewery business of Bass & Co in Burton upon Trent in 1777. His grandson Michael Thomas Bass transformed the company into one of the largest breweries in the United Kingdom. He also represented Derby in Parliament as a Liberal for thirty-five years and was a great benefactor to the town of Burton. However, Bass declined every honour offered to him, including a baronetcy and a peerage.

His son, Michael Arthur Bass, was also involved with the family business (which now had become Bass, Ratcliff, Gretton and Co), and sat as Liberal Member of Parliament for Stafford, East Staffordshire and Burton. Like his father he was also a benefactor of Burton. In 1882 Bass was created a Baronet of Stafford in the County of Stafford, in the Baronetage of the United Kingdom. The title was in honour of his father (who was then still alive), and was created with remainder to his younger brother Hamar Alfred Bass. In 1886 Bass was further honoured when he was raised to the peerage as Baron Burton, of Rangemore and of Burton-on-Trent in the County of Stafford, with remainder to the heirs male of his body. In 1897 he was also created Baron Burton, of Burton-on-Trent and of Rangemore in the County of Stafford, with remainder, in default of male issue, to his daughter and her issue male. On Lord Burton's death in 1909 he was succeeded in the baronetcy according to the special remainder by his nephew, the second Baronet, on whose death in 1952 the title became extinct.

The barony of 1886 became extinct as he had no sons, while he was succeeded in the barony of 1897 according to the special remainder by his daughter Nellie Lisa Baillie, the second Baroness. She was the wife of Colonel James Evan Bruce Baillie (d. 1931) of Dochfour in Inverness-shire. After her first husband's death she married as her second husband Major William Eugene Melles (d. 1953). Her eldest son from her first marriage, George Evan Michael Baillie, was a Brigadier in the British Army, but was killed during the Second World War. Lady Burton was therefore succeeded by her grandson (the son of George Evan Michael Baillie), the third holder of the barony. He was notably a member of the Inverness-shire County Council and of the Inverness District Council and also served as Deputy Lieutenant of Inverness-shire.

From about 1870, Glenquoich Estate was rented by Lord Burton, and "at his hands it has had careful nursing, with all the benefits and advantages of large outlays in numerous improvements, for even in the single matter of roads alone upwards of a hundred and thirty miles of carriage drives and pony tracks have been made, by which means the lodge on the shore of Loch Quoich has been placed in communication with all parts of the deer ground". Glenquoich is a very large sporting estate west of Invergarry, Inverness-shire.

== Bass baronets, of Stafford (1882) ==
- Michael Arthur Bass, 1st Baron Burton and 1st Baronet (1837–1909)
- Sir William Arthur Hamar Bass, 2nd Baronet (1879–1952)

== Barons Burton, First creation (1886) ==
- Michael Arthur Bass, 1st Baron Burton (1837–1909)

== Barons Burton, Second creation (1897) ==
- Michael Arthur Bass, 1st Baron Burton (1837–1909)
- Nellie Lisa Melles, 2nd Baroness Burton (1873–1962)
- Michael Evan Victor Baillie, 3rd Baron Burton (1924–2013)
- Evan Michael Ronald Baillie of Dochfour, 4th Baron Burton (b. 1949)

The heir apparent is the present holder's son James Evan Baillie (b. 1975).

Barons Burton line of succession
- Michael Thomas Bass (1799—1884)
  - Michael Arthur Bass, 1st Baron Burton [1886], 1st Baron Burton [1897], 1st Baronet [1882] (1837—1909)
    - Nellie Lisa Bass, 2nd Baroness Burton (1873—1962)
      - Brigadier Hon. George Evan Michael Baillie (1894—1941)
        - Michael Evan Victor Baillie, 3rd Baron Burton (1924—2013)
          - Evan Michael Ronald Baillie, 4th Baron Burton (b. 1949)
            - (1) Hon. James Evan Baillie (b. 1975)
              - (2) Wilbur Michael John Baillie (b. 2012)
              - (3) Albert William Evan Baillie (b. 2015)
            - (4) Hon. Hamish Michael Baillie (b. 1979)
          - (5) Hon. Alexander James Baillie (b. 1963)
            - (6) Jamie Archibald Baillie (b. 2001)
  - Hamar Alfred Bass (1842—1898)
    - Major Sir William Arthur Hamar Bass, 2nd Baronet (1879—1952)

== Note ==
An earlier Barony of Burton was created in the Peerage of Great Britain in 1712 for Henry Paget, who one year later succeeded his father as 7th Baron Paget of Beaudesert. In 1714 he was also created Earl of Uxbridge. For information on these titles see the Marquess of Anglesey.

Baronetage of the United Kingdom
Preceded by Milbank baronets	Bass baronets of Stafford; 17 May 1882	Succeeded by Pease baronets
