= Michael Baillie, 3rd Baron Burton =

British peer

Michael Evan Victor Baillie, 3rd Baron Burton DL (27 June 1924 – 30 May 2013) was a British peer.

The son of George Evan Michael Baillie and Maud Louisa Emma Cavendish, he was a maternal grandson of the 9th Duke of Devonshire. He was educated at Eton College and served as a lieutenant in the Scots Guards in the Second World War.

In 1962 he inherited the title of Baron Burton from his paternal grandmother Nellie Baillie, 2nd Baroness Burton.

He was an elected county councillor for Inverness-shire 1948–75 and a justice of the peace (J.P.) 1961–75.

He lived at Dochgarroch Lodge, Inverness and died there on 30 May 2013.

== Marriages and children ==
On 28 April 1948, he married Elizabeth Ursula Foster Wise (died 1993). They divorced in 1977 after having six children.

In 1978, he married Coralie Denise Cliffe, of Natal, South Africa (d. 17 January 2022).

== Freemasonry ==
He became a Scottish Freemason having been initiated in Lodge Old Inverness Kilwinning St. John's, No.6, (Inverness-shire) in 1951. He served as master of that lodge 1978–1979. He was also a member of Lodge Sir Robert Moray, No.1641, (Edinburgh, Scotland). He was installed as Grand Master Mason on 25 November 1993, within Freemasons' Hall, 96 George Street, Edinburgh.

Masonic offices
Preceded by Gregor MacGregor	Grand Master of the Grand Lodge of Scotland; 1993–1999	Succeeded by Archibald Donald Orr-Ewing
Peerage of the United Kingdom
Preceded by Nellie Baillie	Baron Burton; 1962–2013	Succeeded by Evan Baillie
