= William Bass (brewer) =

English founder of Bass brewery (1717–1787)

William Bass (1717 – 2 March 1787) was an English entrepreneur who founded Bass Brewery.

== Career ==
The exact origins of William Bass, the founder of the brewery are not clear, but a scholarly account of the history of the Bass brewery shows that in the 1720s he was living with his parents, John and Ann Bass, and his two brothers, John and Thomas, in Hinckley, Leicestershire.

His father, a plumber and glazier, died when William was 15, after which he carried on a carrier business with his older brother John in Hinckley. In 1756 William married Mary Gibbons, daughter of a London publican who ran the Red Lion Inn close to the London depot. They chose Burton-upon-Trent as their home because it was midway between Manchester and London, was a growing industrial-commercial centre, and was ideally positioned on the new Trunk canal, continuing his business there as a carrier of beer, his chief client being Benjamin Printon.

By 1777, aged 60, he had saved some money, and, seeing the growing demand for Burton beer, he entered the brewing business. He bought a town house in the High Street, which contained a brewery and malthouse on adjoining land. Burton was already a thriving brewing town with several breweries exploiting the growing export beer trade via the Trent Navigation and Hull to the Baltic ports in Russia, mainly Saint Petersburg. He established the Bass Brewery and catered mainly for the domestic market, but in 1784 he started to export ale directly to Russia.

Bass is buried in the churchyard of St Modwen's, Burton upon Trent.

== Family ==
Bass married Mary Gibbons and the son was Michael Thomas Bass.

== See also ==
- Brewers of Burton
- Baron Burton
