= Abbot Beyne School =

School in Staffordshire, England

Location
- Linnell Building, Osborne Street; Winshill, Burton upon Trent, Staffordshire, DE15 0JL; England
- 52°48′26″N 1°36′56″W

Information
- Type: Voluntary controlled school
- Established: 1520; 506 years ago
- Founder: Abbot William George Arthur Beyne
- Local authority: Staffordshire
- Specialist: Arts
- Department for Education URN: 124449 Tables
- Ofsted: Reports
- Headteacher: Jamie Tickle
- Gender: Coeducational
- Age: 11 to 18
- Enrolment: 791
- Former name: Burton Grammar School
- Website: www.abbotbeyneschool.co.uk

Abbot Beyne School is a comprehensive school in Burton upon Trent in east Staffordshire, England. It was created after the Burton Grammar School was abolished and initially educated the remaining pupils from Burton Grammar School and Burton Girls' High School who had been selected at the age of 11 as pupils likely to benefit from a highly academic education. It inhabited the Grammar School site but as a newly created comprehensive school, did not inherit its educational pedagogy.

== Location ==
It is situated in Winshill, on the other side of the River Trent to the town centre, east of the B5008, near the junction of the A511 and A444 at Burton Bridge.

== History ==
=== Grammar school ===
William Beyne, Abbot of Burton Abbey, endowed a grammar school in the early 16th century, functioning sometime around 1531. The boys' Grammar School moved to Winshill in 1957. It was administered by the county borough of Burton upon Trent, and known as The Grammar School with about 600 boys. The girls' high school opened in 1928. From April 1974 it was administered by Staffordshire County Council.

Another similar nearby school was the Dovecliff Grammar School, formerly Burton Technical School, on St Mary's Drive in Horninglow, which became Wulfric Comprehensive School in 1975, then De Ferrers High School in 1985.

=== Comprehensive ===
In 1975 the Burton Grammar school was merged with the Burton on Trent Girls' High School and Ada Chadwick Secondary Modern School to become Abbot Beyne mixed Comprehensive School on Mill Hill Lane but it was a newly created school. Other than using the name of the founder of the Grammar School, Abbot Beyne and using the site in Winshill, it did not inherit any of the previous school's traditions or educational practices. Pupils were no longer selected on ability.

== Academic performance ==
The school achieves GCSE and A-level results around the England average, with the A-level results being slightly better than the GCSE results.

== Sport ==
Abbot Beyne has an array of sporting facilities, including; two gymnasiums, rugby pitches, two athletic tracks, two football pitches and numerous tennis courts.

== Notable former pupils ==
=== The Grammar School ===
- Michael Thomas Bass, brewer and MP
- Adrian John Brown, Professor of Biology and Chemistry of Fermentation from 1899 to 1919 at the University of Birmingham
- Brian Hackett, Professor of Landscape Architecture from 1967 to 1977 at Newcastle University, and President from 1967 to 1969 of the Institute of Landscape Architects (now the Landscape Institute)
- Anthony Hardy (b. 1951), serial killer in London
- Paul Harvey (artist)
- Francis Ley, industrialist
- Alfred Newbould, cinematographer and Liberal MP from 1919 to 1922 for Leyton West
- Bob Plant, soldier
- Edward Wightman (d. 1612), nontrinitarian Baptist pastor, last person burnt at the stake for heresy in England
- Alastair Yates, former BBC and Sky News journalist

=== The Comprehensive School ===
- Jane Furniss, Chief Executive since 2006 of the Independent Police Complaints Commission (IPCC)
