= Auden (surname) =

Auden is a surname, and may refer to:

- George Augustus Auden (1872–1957), English physician
- John Bicknell Auden (1903–1991), English geologist and explorer, for whom Auden's Col in the Himalayas is named
- John Auden (1894–1959), English solicitor, soldier and collector
- Tony Auden (fl.2005), Australian meteorologist
- W. H. Auden (1907–1973), Anglo-American poet
