= Auden (name) =

Auden is both a surname and a given name. Notable people with the name include:

== Surname ==
- Auden (surname)

== Given name ==
- Auden Grogins (born 1962), an American politician
- Auden Schendler, American climate activist
- Auden Tate, American football player
- Auden Thornton (born 1988), an American actress

== See also ==
- Auden (disambiguation)
