= Battle of Burton Bridge (1322) =

Battle between Thomas, 2nd Earl of Lancaster and his cousin King Edward II of England

- Part of the Despenser War
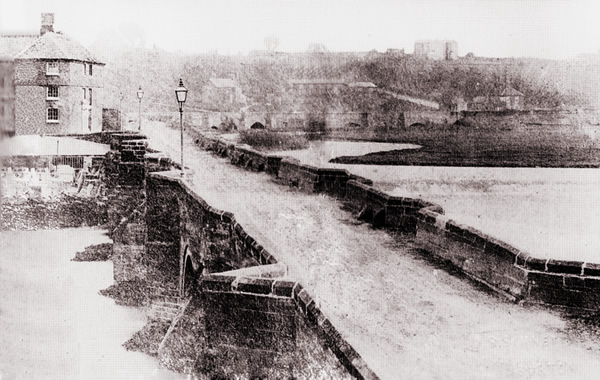
- A Victorian photograph of the medieval Burton Bridge
Date	7–10 March 1322
Location	Burton upon Trent 52.8067°N 1.6238°W
Result	Royalist victory

Belligerents
Royalists	Contrariants

Commanders and leaders
King Edward II	Earl of Lancaster

Strength
Unknown	Up to 3,000 men

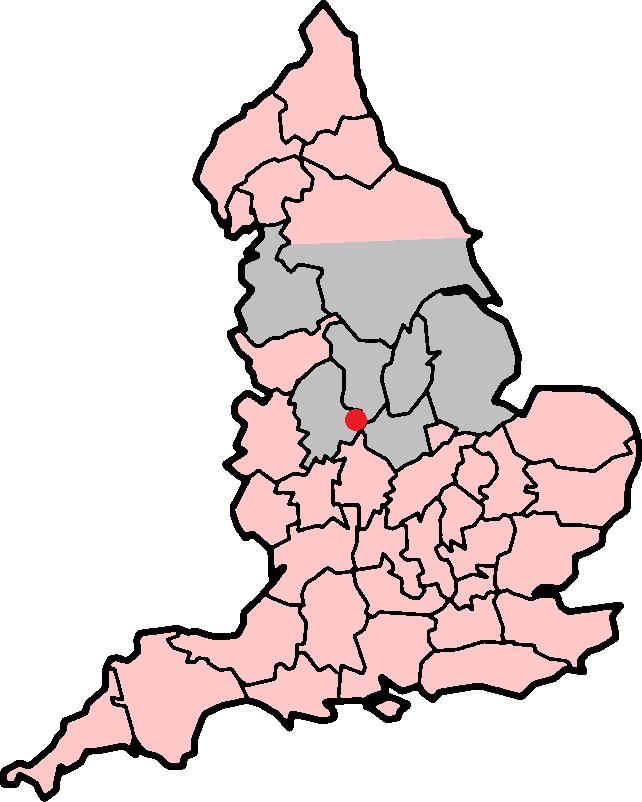
The location of the battle. The map shows Thomas's possessions in grey, Edward's in pink.

The Battle of Burton Bridge was fought between Thomas, 2nd Earl of Lancaster and his cousin King Edward II of England during the Despenser War, from 7 to 10 March 1322. Edward's army was proceeding northwards to engage Lancaster, having defeated his Marcher Lord allies in Wales. Lancaster fortified the bridge at Burton upon Trent, an important crossing of the River Trent, in an attempt to prevent the King from proceeding. Edward arrived at nearby Cauldwell on 7 March 1322 and intended to use the ford at Walton-on-Trent to cross the river and outflank Lancaster. Edward was delayed for three days by floodwaters, during which time some of his force was deployed opposite Lancaster's men at the bridge.

On 10 March 1322 Edward's main force crossed the river at Walton and proceeded to the south side of Burton. Lancaster moved his men outside the town, intending to face the King in open battle, but withdrew northwards when he saw that he was heavily outnumbered. Lancaster was pursued closely by the King's men and eventually captured at the Battle of Boroughbridge; he was later executed on the King's orders. Lancaster's defeat removed the immediate threat to Edward's rule, but the King continued to prove unpopular with his barons, and in 1327 was forced to abdicate the throne in favour of his son Edward III.

== Background ==
Thomas, Earl of Lancaster had long been an enemy of the King, alienated by his practice of promoting young favourites (and alleged lovers) such as Piers Gaveston, 1st Earl of Cornwall, who had at one stage been made regent in Edward's absence. Lancaster further demonstrated his disapproval of the King by his refusal to assist Edward in his Scottish campaigns, including the decisive defeat at the Battle of Bannockburn. The resulting raids by the Scottish on Northern England forced Edward to concede to demands from his barons for the kingdom to be governed by a council led by the Earl and to submit to the restrictions on royal power laid out in the Ordinances of 1311. Shortly afterwards Lancaster captured and executed Gaveston after an attack upon Scarborough Castle. The new baronial council demonstrated itself no more suited to rule than the King by failing to prevent the loss of Berwick-upon-Tweed to the Scots in 1318.

Edward continued to alienate the Barons by promoting young men such as Hugh Despenser the Younger, a known enemy of Lancaster's. In 1318 Lancaster met with Archbishop of Dublin Alexander de Bicknor and two bishops at Horninglow, now a suburb of Burton upon Trent, in initial negotiations that resulted in the signing of the Treaty of Leake, an attempt to reconcile the King and his barons. However such co-operation was short-lived as Despenser's continued rise threatened the holdings of the Welsh Marcher Lords and in 1321 Lancaster joined them in an outright rebellion against Edward.

== Battle ==
Edward acted quickly against the Marcher Lords, defeating them easily due to a lack of co-ordination amongst them, before moving north to confront Lancaster. The Earl moved from his base at Pontefract, West Yorkshire to block the strategically important crossing of the River Trent at Burton. He arrived in early March 1322, having lost much of his stores to floods en route, and set about fortifying the western end of the bridge, a 36-arch stone structure that was 515 yards (471 m) long and just 15 feet (4.6 m) wide. Lancaster sent out men to prevent the King from crossing the Trent elsewhere and outmanoeuvring him. Two such men were John de Myner, master forester of Needwood Forest, and Richard de Holland, who broke the bridges at Wychnor and Hamstall Ridware. De Holland was later fined 40 shillings by the King for his actions. De Holland's kinsman Lord Robert de Holland had long been a supporter of Lancaster, was said to be his closest friend, and had raised troops for him to send against the King's men in Cheshire. However, on 4 March de Holland received a secret order from the King to join him against Lancaster which he seems to have obeyed, forming a body of troops at Ravensdale Park in Derbyshire ostensibly to reinforce Lancaster's army at Burton.

Edward arrived at nearby Cauldwell on 7 March 1322, intending to make use of the ford at Walton-on-Trent to outflank Lancaster. This ford was, however, impassable due to flooding, and for three days Edward waited. During this time Edward ordered an attack upon Lancaster's fortified position, and despite a full day's fighting, the Royalist forces were unable to make any headway. Lancaster awaited reinforcement from Holland, who had encamped with his men at Dalbury, 6 miles (9.7 km) north of Burton. Holland, however, apparently wished to await the result of the battle prior to committing himself and revealing his loyalties. Holland may have actually sent Lancaster letters intended to draw his men away from Burton.

Edward's troops were able to cross the Trent at Walton on 10 March 1322 and advanced upon Burton from the south. Lancaster, outflanked, then moved from his positions at the bridge to a field outside of Burton, firing the town as he went. Once he realised how badly outnumbered his men were, and that Holland was not moving to his aid, Lancaster decided to withdraw and was pursued by Edward. The clash is not classified as a battle by English Heritage, though some casualties were suffered, and is not registered as a battlefield with the Battlefields Trust. The casualties included the keeper of Alton Castle, Sir Roger D'Amory, who was injured in the fight and later died of his wounds at Tutbury.

== Aftermath ==
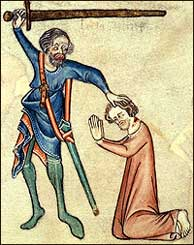
A medieval depiction of the execution of Thomas, Earl of Lancaster

The King's troops, led by John de Warenne, 7th Earl of Surrey and Edmund of Woodstock, 1st Earl of Kent, chased Lancaster to Tutbury and Kenilworth, capturing both towns and devastating the counties of Staffordshire and Derbyshire. Holland, seeing the outcome of the battle and knowing that the King had recently imprisoned his daughter at the Tower of London, openly acted against Lancaster. Holland's men attacked and robbed various supporters of Lancaster at Windley including Hugh de Audley and Lancaster's wife Alice de Lacy to the value of £1,000. He also ordered the men raised in Cheshire to march towards Burton and prevent the escape of Lancaster's troops to the River Mersey. Holland turned his troops over to the King at Derby on 13 March but was coldly received, his past alliance with Lancaster condemning him to imprisonment at Dover Castle and the loss of his estates. He was beheaded by an unknown gang in 1328 and his head was given to Thomas Lancaster's brother Henry, 3rd Earl of Lancaster.

Lancaster was able to flee Tutbury Castle under cover of darkness and, with much of his army, evaded Edward's patrols to cross the flooded River Dove and make his way northwards. Upon taking Tutbury, Edward ordered D'Amory's corpse to be posthumously executed for treason. Lancaster fled north where Sir Andrew Harclay, having heard of the King's victory at Burton, moved to engage him at the Battle of Boroughbridge. Lancaster was defeated and captured by Harclay and later executed at Pontefract. Edward ordered a chapel constructed on the Burton bridge in commemoration of his victory there.

Lancaster had finally been dealt with, but Edward continued to upset his barons, reneging upon his previously agreed limitations to royal power, continuing to promote Despenser and losing key battles against the Scots. With Edward's reign becoming more unpopular, Lancaster's grave became a site of pilgrimage for those who opposed him. Edward's own queen, Isabella of France, sided with her lover, the Marcher Lord Roger Mortimer, and in 1327 forced Edward to abdicate in favour of his son who became Edward III.

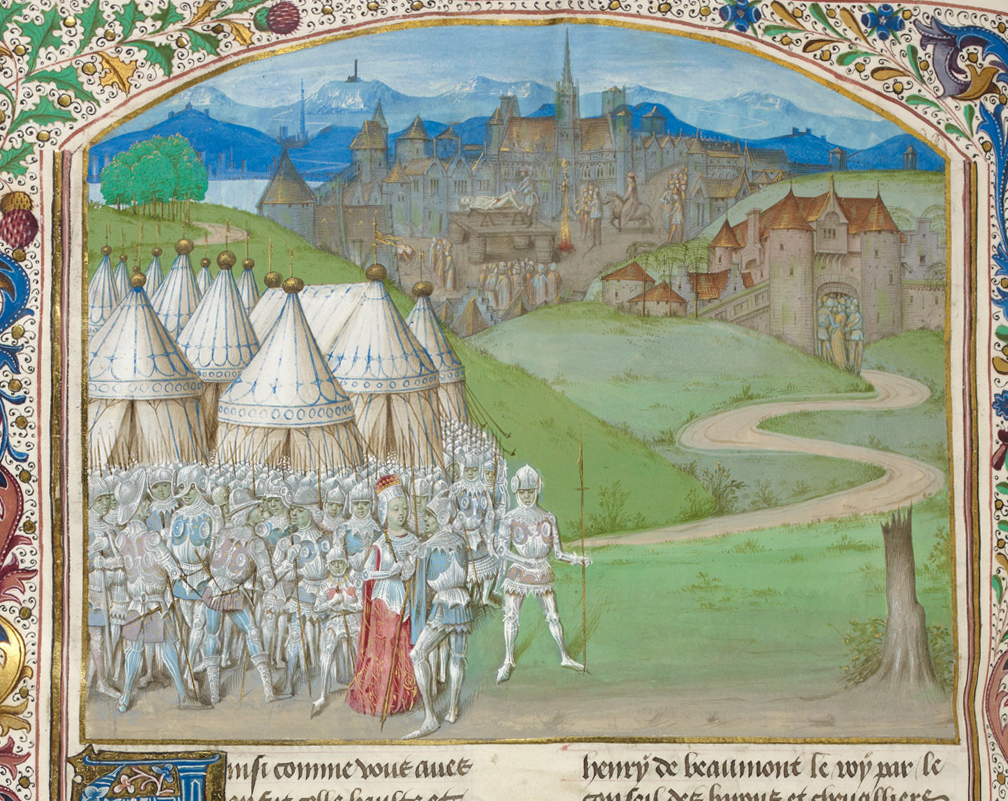
Isabella and Mortimer at the head of their army

In the aftermath of the battle, the Audley family claimed to have lost £300 of goods: seven cartloads of gold cloth, silver vessels and chapel ornaments from Heleigh Castle. These had been ordered to be removed to Tutbury Priory by Peter de Lymesey, but according to the prior they never arrived and were taken to Tutbury Castle and subsequently lost in the retreat of the Lancastrians from Burton. Burton Abbey also suffered damage at the hands of the Lancastrian forces.

The Abbot of Burton was charged with concealing goods from the king after it was claimed he had taken the Earl of Lancaster's money and goods left behind after the battle, to the value of £200. The abbot claimed that all he had found was a single silver cup which he subsequently gave to the king. The finding in 1831 of a large quantity of silver coins, (Note: The 1832 discovery, believed to number 100,000-360,000 coins, is thought to be the largest coin hoard ever discovered in the UK. The whereabouts of only 1,500 of these coins are known with the remainder suspected of having been taken by local villagers upon the discovery of the hoard. The British Museum holds some of the coins and has previously appealed for the owners of any to come forward so that they can be recorded.) suspected to be part of Lancaster's treasure, in the River Dove, near Tutbury may support the abbot's case. In either case, the next year Edward felt able to award Burton Abbey the advowsons of Tatenhill and Hanbury, which had previously belonged to Lancaster, in "perpetual memory of the glorious victory which God gave to the King over his enemies and the rebels near Burton-on-Trent, and also to relieve the condition of the Abbey".

The battle gave rise to a tradition at nearby Chartley Park, a holding of John de Ferrers, 2nd Baron Ferrers of Chartley. The baron maintained a herd of white cattle with black ears, descended from wild specimens found when the park was formed from part of the ancient Needwood Forest. In 1322 an unusual black calf was born in the herd that was said to have foretold the Battle of Burton Bridge and the subsequent downfall of the de Ferrers house (who were supporters of Lancaster). Subsequently it was said that the birth of a dark-hued or part-coloured calf in the herd would foretell a death in the de Ferrers family within the year. Such omens were said to have preceded the deaths of, amongst others, Robert Shirley, 7th Earl Ferrers; his wife; their son Robert Sewallis Shirley and his wife and the son, daughter and wife of Washington Shirley, the 8th Earl. Another local tradition places the legendary figure of Robin Hood at the battle fighting for Lancaster.
