= Horninglow and Eton =

Civil parish in Staffordshire, England

Coordinates: 52.820°N 1.648°W

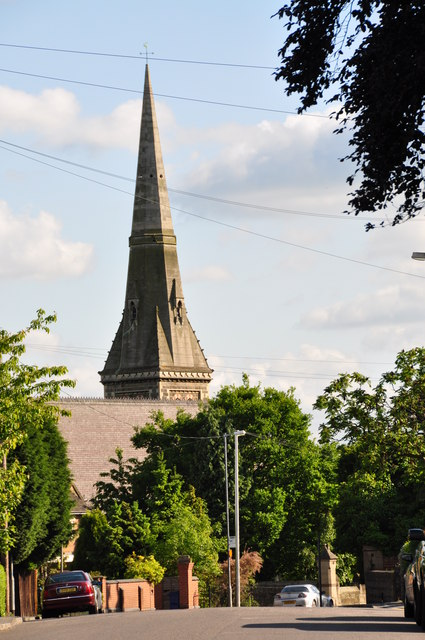
- St John the Divine, Horninglow from the Rolleston Road

- Location within Staffordshire
- Area: 2.999 km^{2} (1.158 sq mi)
- Population: 15,700 (2021 census)
  - Density: 5,235/km^{2} (13,560/sq mi)
- Civil parish: Horninglow and Eton
- District: East Staffordshire
- Shire county: Staffordshire
- Region: West Midlands
- Country: England
- Sovereign state: United Kingdom

Horninglow and Eton is a civil parish in the East Staffordshire district, in the county of Staffordshire, England. It covers an area located in the west of Burton upon Trent, including Horninglow. In 2021 the parish had a population of 15,700. The parish was created on 1 April 2003.

== See also ==
- Listed buildings in Horninglow and Eton
