= Arthur Plant =

Arthur Plant may refer to:

- Bob Plant (Arthur Blurton Plant; 1915–2011), British Army officer during World War II
- Arthur (plant), a running gag in Mad magazine

== See also ==
- Arthur Plante (1869–1927), Quebec lawyer and political figure
