= Auden =

Auden may refer to:

- Auden (name), including a list of people with the given name and surname
  - W. H. Auden (1907–1973), British-American poet
- Auden, Ontario, in Unorganized Thunder Bay District, Canada
  - Auden station
- Auden, a private-label brand by Target

== See also ==
- Auden Group, a 1930s group of British and Irish writers including W. H. Auden
- Auden's Col, a mountain pass in the Himalayas
