= St Chad's, Burton upon Trent =

Church in Staffordshire, England

Coordinates: 52°49′03″N 01°38′10″W

St Chad's Church, Burton upon Trent
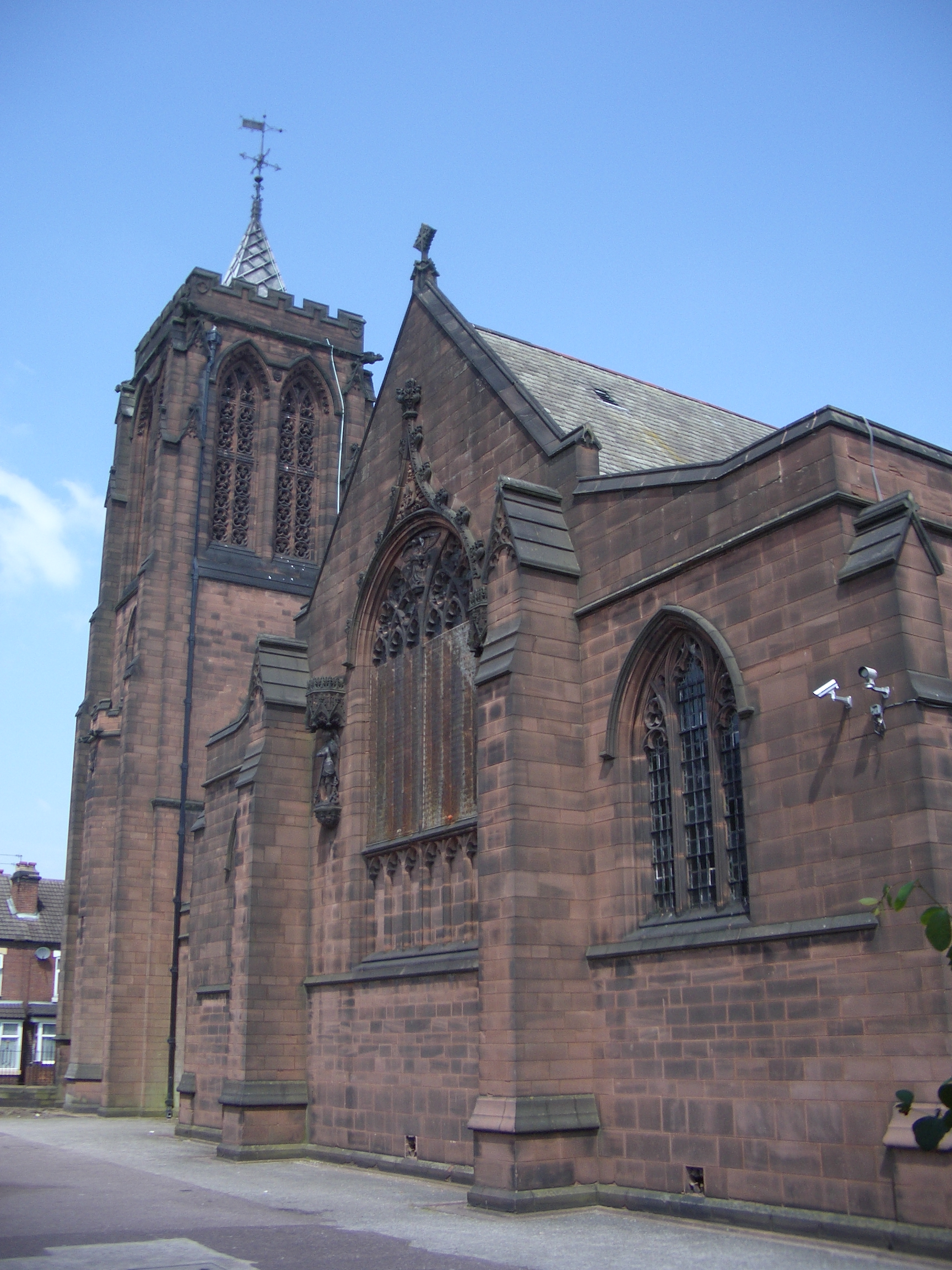
- St Chad's Church
- St Chad's Church, Burton upon Trent
- Denomination: Church of England
- Churchmanship: Anglo Catholic, Liberal Evangelical
- Website: http://www.stchadsburton.org.uk/

Administration
- Province: Province of Canterbury
- Diocese: Diocese of Lichfield

Clergy
- Vicar: The Revd Dr George Crossley

St Chad's Church is an Anglican church on Hunter Street in Burton upon Trent, Staffordshire, England. It is in the diocese of Lichfield and the advowson is vested in the bishop. In 1979 the church was registered as a Grade I listed building.

== History ==
The church was a gift to the town by Michael Bass, 1st Baron Burton at a cost of £38,000. The architect was George Frederick Bodley but he died before the church was completed and it was finished by his partner Cecil Greenwood Hare. Work started in 1905 and the church dedication to Saint Chad of Mercia took place in 1910.

== The building ==
The church was designed in the Decorated style and built of red Hollington stone. The building includes a polygonal vestry and a detached north-west tower linked to the body of the church by a vaulted passage. There is a fine Bodley reredos in the north chapel.

It has been described by Nikolaus Pevsner as "the finest building by far in Burton-on-Trent" and in the listing text as "one of Bodley's best later works".

== Organ ==
The organ inside the church is a three manual organ built by Peter Conacher and Co of Huddersfield (installed by 1909). The organ has 32 stops and consists of a swell, great, choir and pedal organ. The organ has a stop key system and has pure tin pipes which gives it a sweet sound.

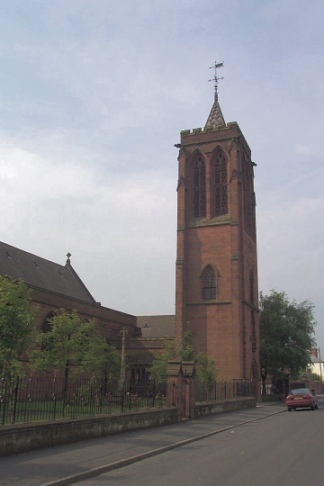
The tower

== Tower ==
The tower was intended to house a peal of eight bells. The frame was installed circa 1909 along with just one bell. The bell and frame were made by John Taylor & Co of Loughborough; the frame is a two-tier H frame with sub A frames on top. The bell that Taylors cast was the tenor bell which weighed 21-1-8 cwt and was tuned to the note of E. In 1999 Christchurch church at Newchurch near Burton upon Trent became redundant, and the six bells in it were put up for sale; the then vicar of St Chad's, Paul Skillings, put in a successful bid. The bells went back to Taylors for refurbishment and two new trebles were cast to take the peal up to an eight; one bell was donated by local football club Burton Albion F.C. whose ground is in the parish.

The new eight became a 13 cwt ring in the key of G. However, due to this the bell that was already in the tower was incompatible, and it was decided to sell the bell. Finally in 2000 the church had a peal of eight bells after ninety years.

== Timeline ==
- 1903 Initial designs completed by Bodley
- 1907 Death of Bodley
- 1909 Church completed
- 1910 Church consecrated by the Bishop of Lichfield on 6 July
- 1960 Reredos executed by Bridgeman of Lichfield.

== Gallery ==
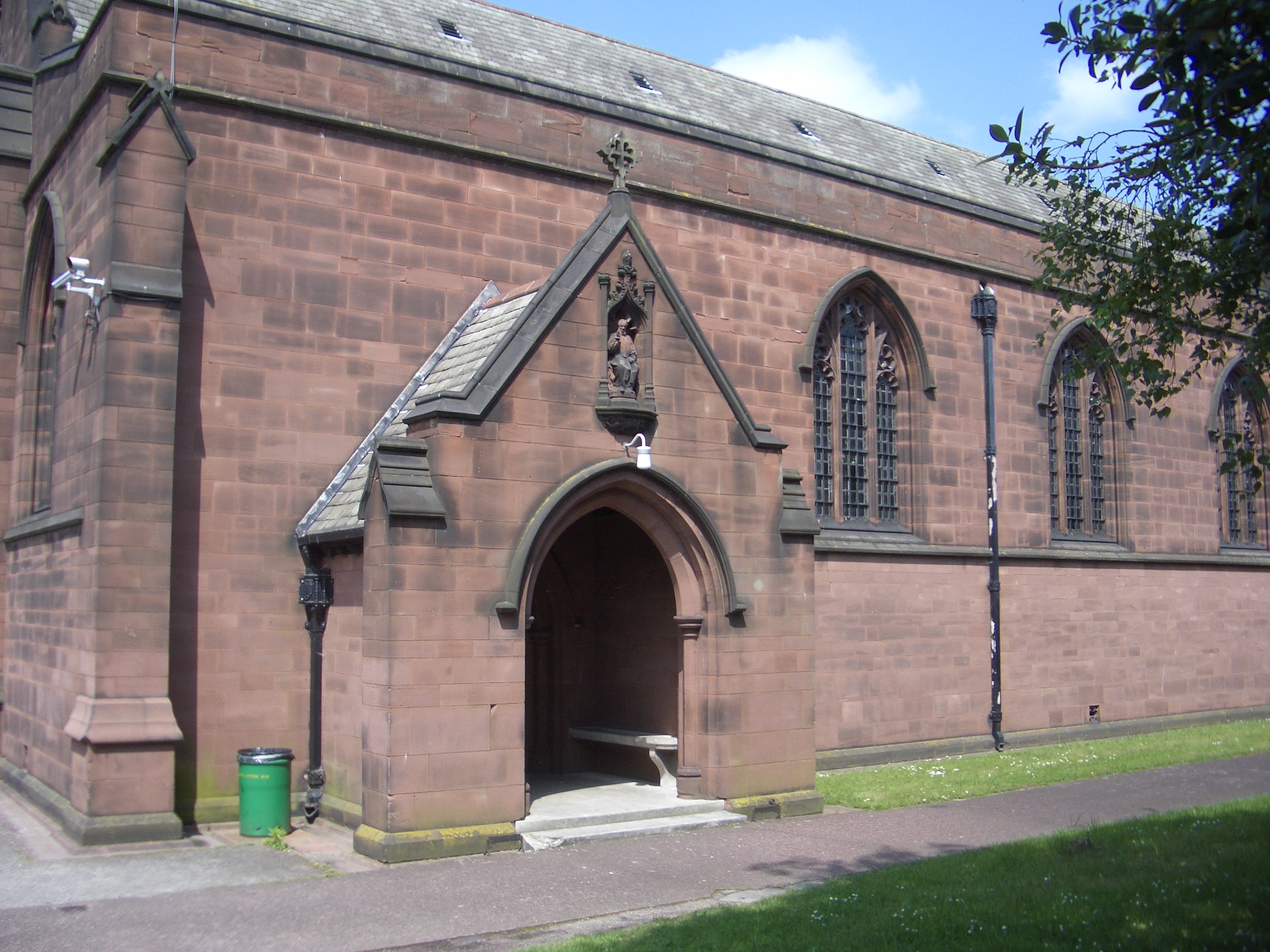

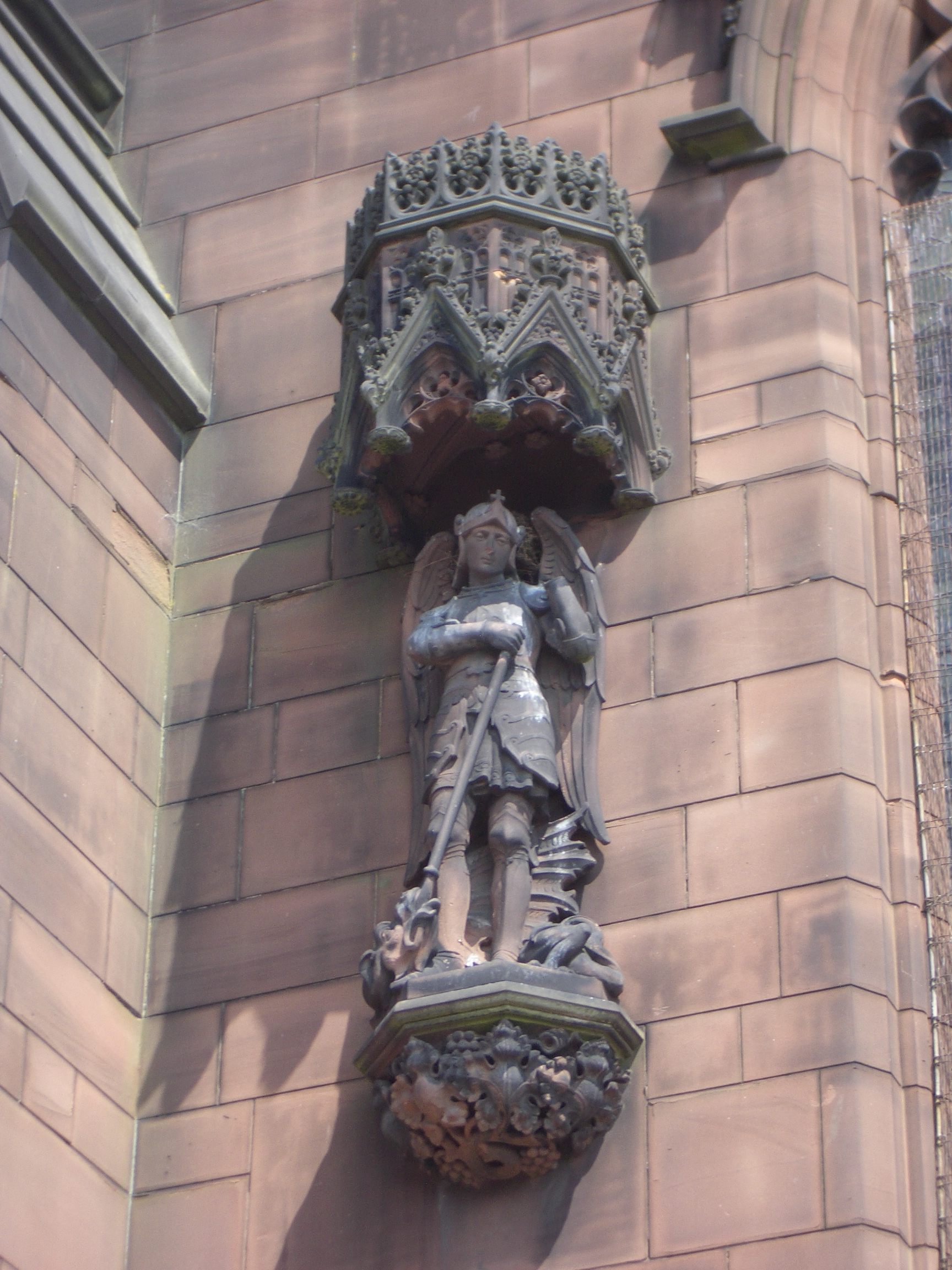

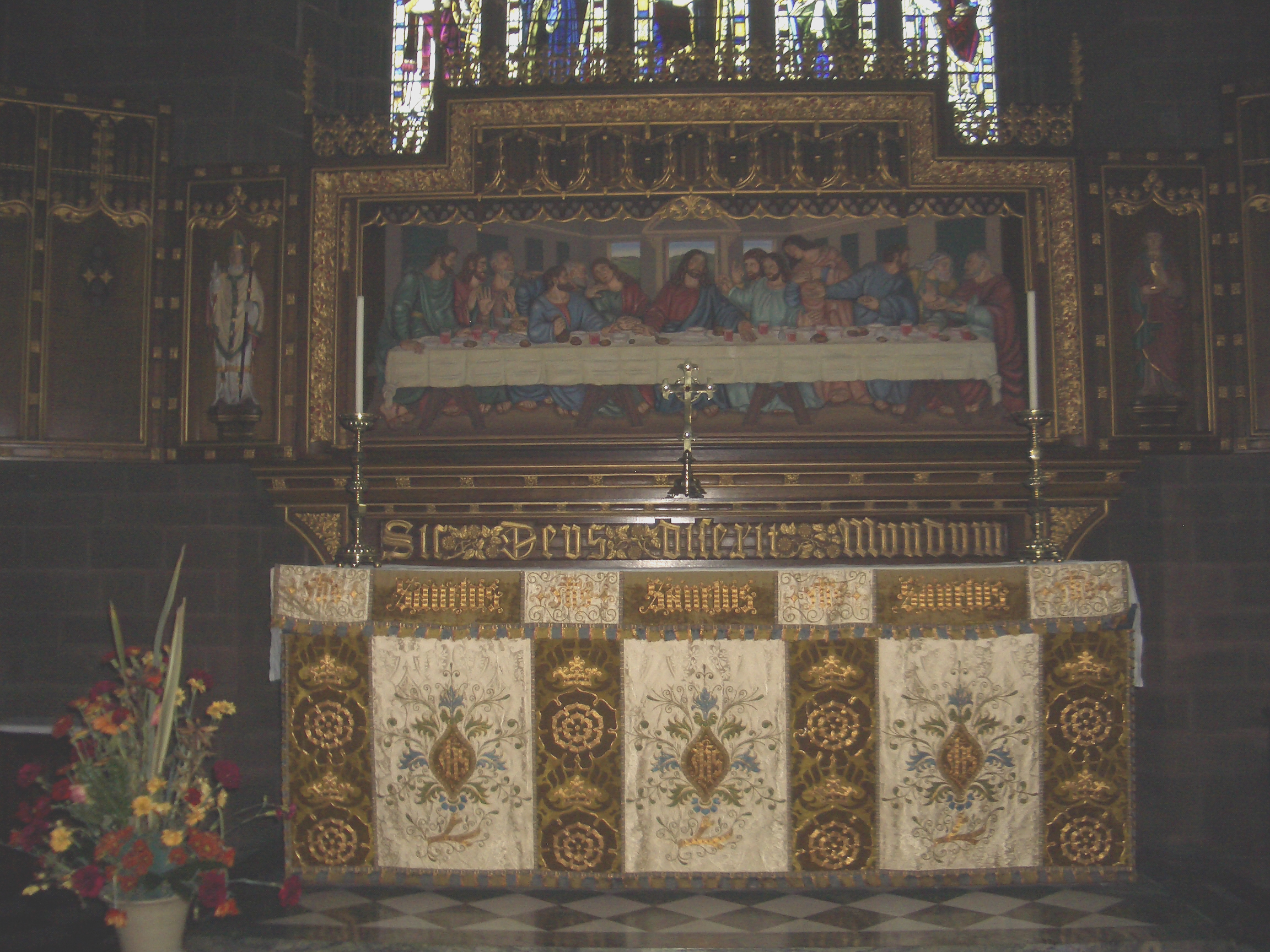

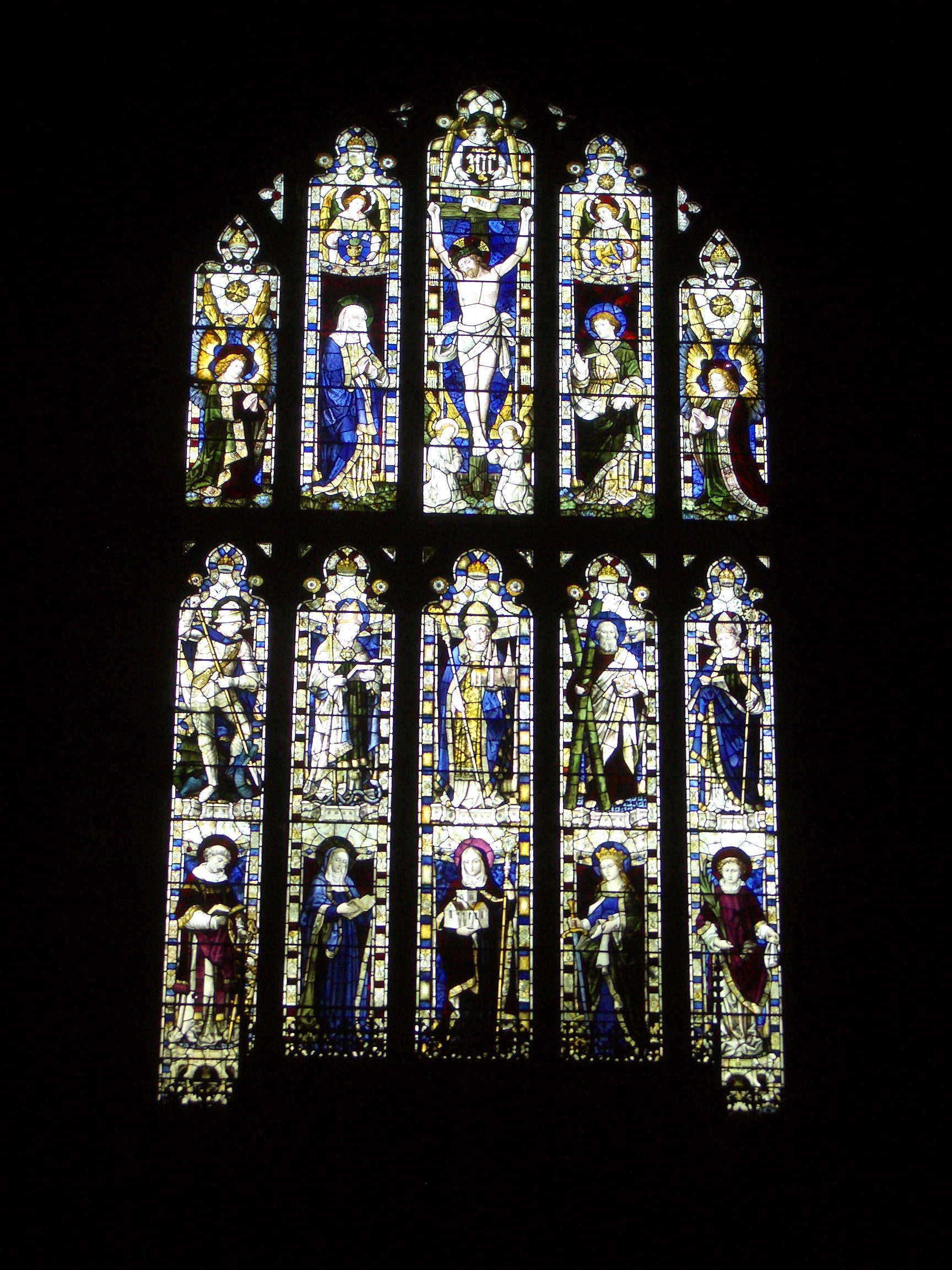

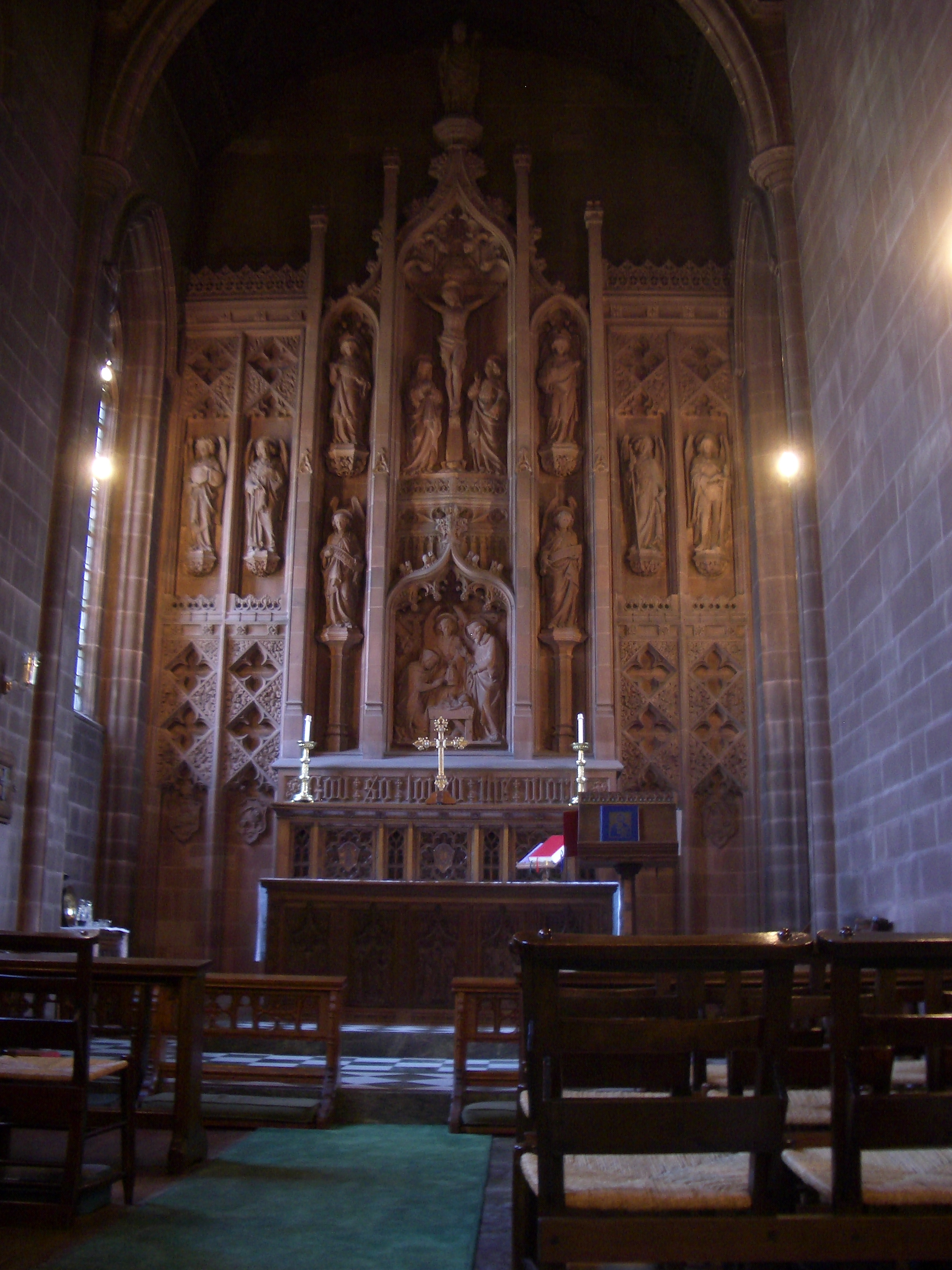

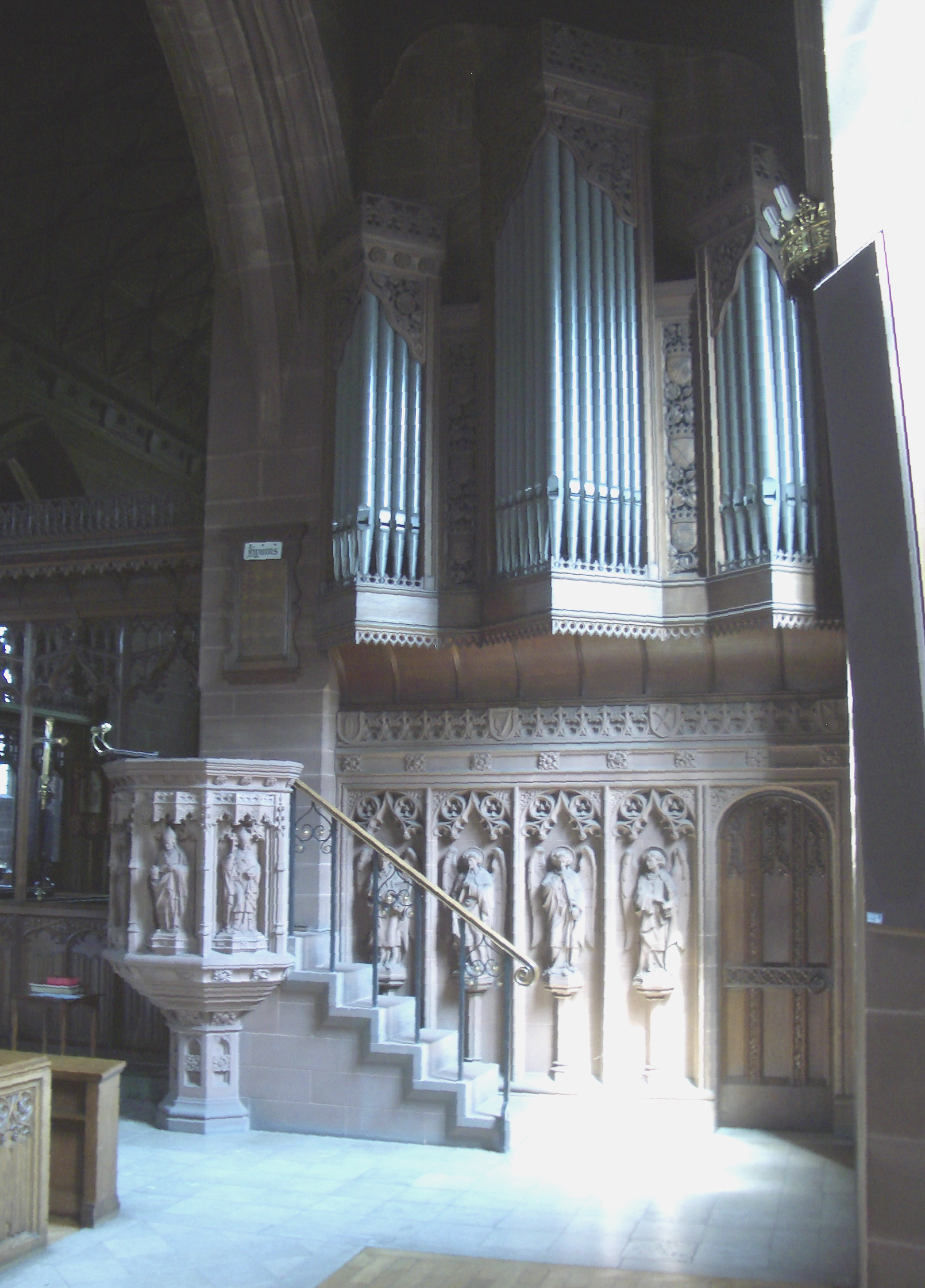

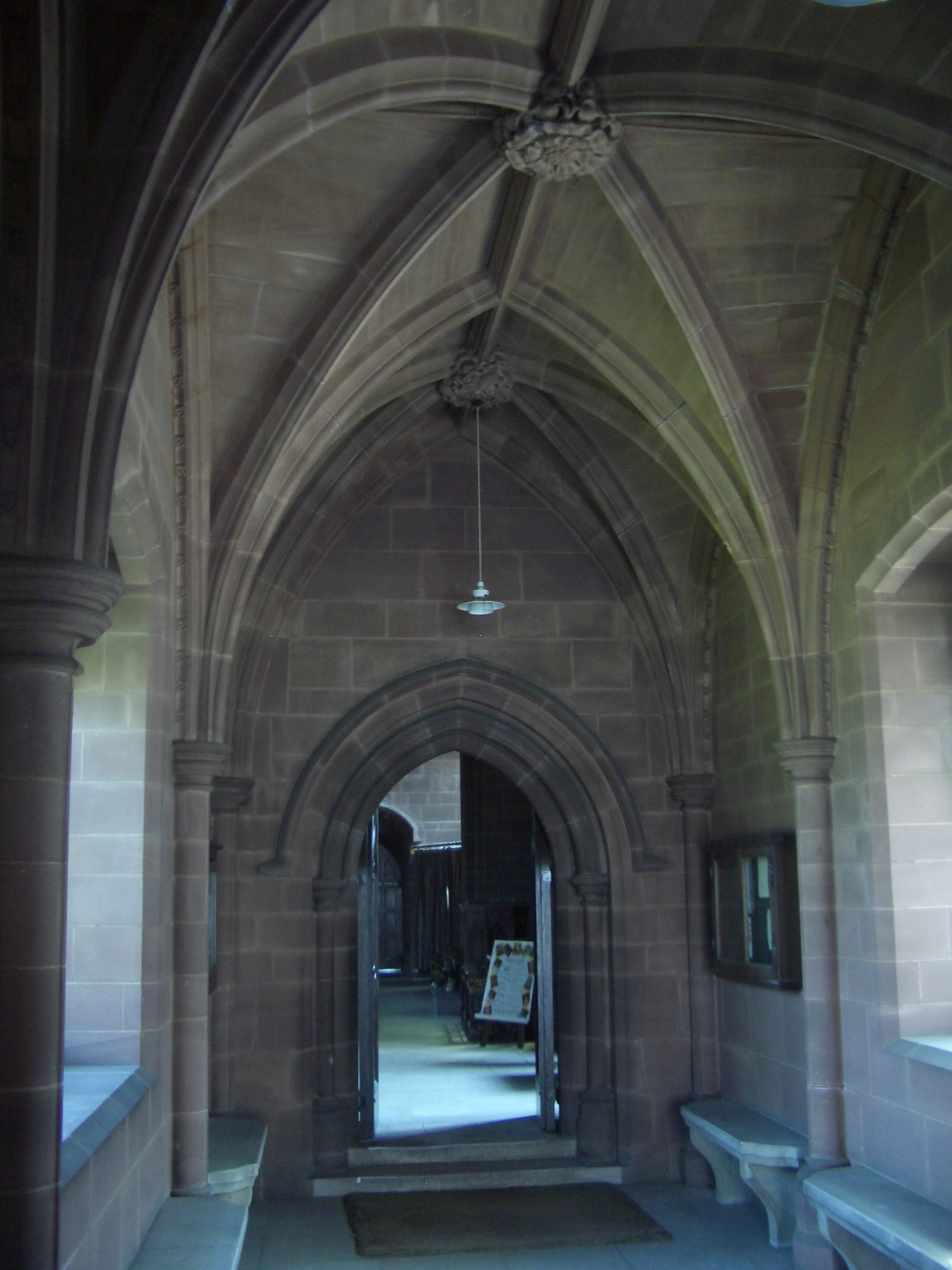

== See also ==
- Grade I listed churches in Staffordshire
- Listed buildings in Horninglow and Eton

== Sources ==
- Church guidebook. C. Mansfield. 2006.
- The Buildings of England, Staffordshire. Pevsner.
- British History Online 'Horninglow: Established church', A History of the County of Stafford: Volume 9: Burton-upon-Trent (2003), pp. 185–187.
