= Nigel Boddice =

British trumpeter and band leader (1952–2022)

Nigel Boddice MBE
- Born: 3 July 1952; Burton upon Trent, England
- Died: 12 October 2022 (aged 70)
- Genres: Classical Music; Brass Bands
- Occupations: Conductor and instrumentalist
- Instruments: Trumpet, cornet
- Labels: Decca Records, Naxos
- Formerly of: BBC Scottish Symphony Orchestra, Salon Orchestra, Royal Conservatoire of Scotland

Nigel Boddice MBE, hon. ARAM (1952 – 12 October 2022) was a British trumpet player, conductor and band leader who was prominent in the UK brass band scene. He performed and recorded (as both a conductor and an instrumentalist) with many orchestras and bands over his lifetime, including a 20-year tenure as the Section Principal Trumpet of the BBC Scottish Symphony Orchestra.

Boddice worked extensively with youth bands, including the WSSO Concert Band and the West Lothian Schools Brass Band, which he conducted to numerous successes at the National Youth Brass Band Championships of Scotland. He received an MBE for his work with young musicians in the 2005 Birthday Honours.

== Education and early life ==
Boddice was born in Burton upon Trent in 1952 and studied at Dovecliff Grammar School secondary school. He joined the National Youth Brass Band of Great Britain as a teen before starting university education. He completed his university education at the Royal Academy of Music (RAM), studying with Alexander Gibson and Jerzy Maksymuick.

=== Gresley Colliery Brass Band ===
Boddice began his life with brass bands conducting and playing with the Gresley Colliery Brass Band, where he learned to play trumpet and cornet at the age of 5. He was the youngest member of the band when he joined aged six. In 1960, Boddice participated in the National Brass Band Championships with Gresley, which they won for the first time in their history. This was one of the first experiences Boddice had winning a major competition. When Boddice grew older, Gresley was one of his first experiences with conducting a group, which progressed into his long career with various ensembles. Boddice eventually became principal cornet at Gresley. Even after he left for future studies and work, he still conducted the band on occasion, even becoming the president of the Gresley Youth Band in 2009.

== Career ==
Boddice had a long history of performing both as a conductor and trumpeter. He was the Trumpet Section Principal in the BBC Scottish Symphony Orchestra (BBCSSO) for 20 years (1975–1995). In other activities with the BBC, Boddice also led the BBC Scottish Brass Ensemble. He was a founding member and conductor of the Salon Orchestra, an offshoot from the BBCSSO to let players perform fun pieces with less stress involved.

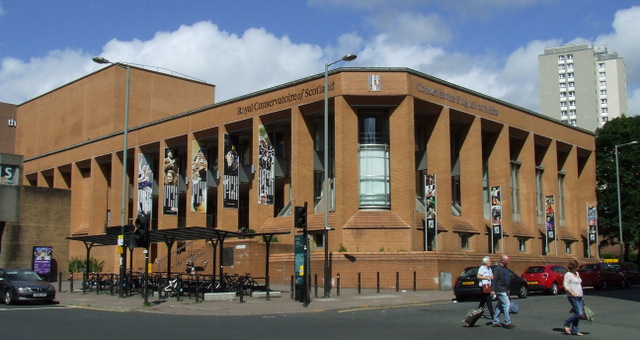
Boddice was one of the longest serving members of staff at the Royal Conservatoire of Scotland

Boddice worked at the RSAMD (now Royal Conservatoire of Scotland) in Glasgow as a brass lecturer, trumpet teacher and later conductor of their Wind orchestra. He had input into their symphony orchestra program, which is a prestigious ensemble in of itself. He was one of their longest serving members of staff, having worked there for 44 years. In terms of other educational institutions, Boddice also worked with the University of Salford and Royal Northern College of Music as an external examiner, and with the National Youth Orchestras of Scotland as a brass tutor.

He appeared on numerous recordings, including as a soloist on the 1974 Decca LP The Music of Malcolm Arnold with the City of London Brass and, during his time at the BBCSSO, on a Naxos recording of Benjamin Britten's War Requiem. Other notable performances include a series of children's concerts with Northern Ireland's Ulster Orchestra, New Year's Day celebrations with the Scottish Philharmonia, a Reid Concert with The Albany Brass Consort, conducting the National Youth Wind Orchestra of Wales and performing with the Armenian Chamber Orchestra in Yerevan.

From 1984 to 2013, Boddice conducted the West Lothian Schools Brass Band, a group who have been referred to as "the finest youth band in Scotland". Under his leadership, they won the National Youth Brass Band Competition ten times and the Scottish Youth Brass Band Competition three times. In 1986 they won a Gold Award at the Sydney International Music Festival and were named the BBC Radio 2 Brass Band of the Year in 1988. In 1990 they appeared in a BBC Television broadcast segment.

In 1986, Boddice was chosen to take part in a scientific study on the difference between beginner and professional trumpet players. The findings were published in the New Scientist magazine.

Boddice worked as the Chief Conductor of the Royal Norwegian Navy Band (KNMM) for seven years, recording performances of various pieces. During his time in Scandinavia, he conducted three bands (YBS, Manger, and Silkeborg) and collaborated with musicians such as Ole Edvard Antonsen, Christian Linberg, Michaela Petri and Solveig Kringlebotn.

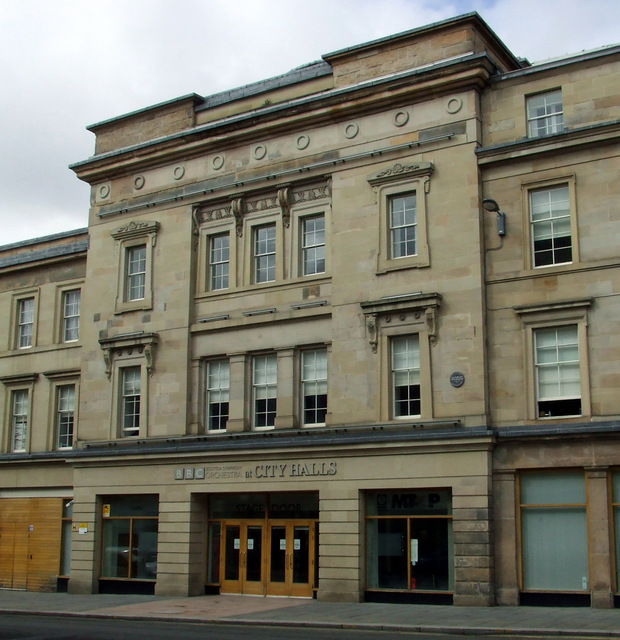
The WSSO concert band's 2022 performance at Glasgow City Halls was one of the final concerts Boddice conducted before his death

Boddice conducted the West of Scotland Schools Orchestra Trust (WSSO) concert band up until 2022, retiring in August. The WSSO is an organisation dedicated to giving children the opportunity to play their instruments in an orchestral setting, with concerts scheduled for their yearly residential courses. The WSSO Concert Band sometimes host crossovers and other special events, such as a European trip in 2016 and a joint performance with the Lynbrook High School Band (United States) in 2022. Notable venues include the Royal Concert Hall and City Halls, both in Glasgow. Boddice worked with many young musicians in the program. The WSSO Concert Band's last performance of their 2022 series on 31 August was one of the final concerts he conducted before his death.

== Personal life ==
Boddice was the only child of Esme Boddice (died 1998) and Des Boddice (died 18 May 2009, aged 81), president of the Gresley Colliery Brass Band. He had three children including Holly Boddice, a trumpeter who studied at the RCS and now plays as part of the Brass Trio "Granny Green".

Boddice died on 12 October 2022 after a short illness. Following his death, tributes were made to Boddice through social media, including a tweet by the Royal Conservatoire of Scotland:

We are deeply saddened to share the news that our dear colleague Nigel Boddice MBE passed away peacefully last night after a short illness. Nigel was one of our longest-serving lecturers, having been associated with RCS for 44 years. We’ve lost a highly respected colleague and exceptionally talented trumpet player and conductor. A true and generous musician who touched the lives of almost everyone in the building and influenced the careers of brass musicians throughout Scotland and beyond for generations.

== Awards and honours ==
- Boddice was made a MBE in The Queen's Birthday Honours (2005) for "services to Youth Music in Scotland, specifically for his work with West Lothian Schools Brass Band".
- Boddice was made an Honorary Associate of the Royal Academy of Music (hon. ARAM).
- He received the first Mortimer Medal from The Worshipful Company of Musicians, a livery company in London. The Mortimer Medal is awarded every year to "someone who has made an outstanding contribution to the UK brass band tradition".
- 2-time winner (1977 and 1978) of the BBC Radio Scotland's 'Fanfare' Brass Contest conducting the Cooperative Brass Band (then known as CWS).
- 10-time winner of National Youth Brass Band Competition with West Lothian Schools Brass Band.
- 3-time winner of Scottish Youth Brass Band Competition with West Lothian Schools Brass Band.
- 1st place at the 1980 Second Section National Brass Band Championships with Newtongrange Silver Band.
- 1996 BBC Radio 2 Brass Band of the Year with West Lothian Schools Brass Band.
- 1998 Gold Award at the Sydney International Music Festival with West Lothian Schools Brass Band.
- In 2007, Boddice won 1st in both Junior and Senior sections of the Scottish Brass Band Championship with West Lothian Schools Brass Band and the Kirkintillioch band.
- Conducted the Cooperative Brass Band in a segment on BBC Radio Scotland's Classics Unwrapped.
- Honoured by Scottish Composers Society for his support of contemporary Scottish composers.

== See also ==
- Brass band sections in the United Kingdom
- The de Ferrers Academy
