= Alastair Yates =

English news anchor (1952–2018)

- Born: Alastair Kenneth Yates; 3 September 1952; Burton upon Trent, Staffordshire, England
- Died: 26 July 2018 (aged 65); England
- Education: Burton Grammar School
- Occupations: Journalist; Communications
- Years active: 1973–2018
- Notable credit(s): BBC News; BBC World News; Sky News

Alastair Kenneth Yates (3 September 1952 – 26 July 2018) was an English news anchor, for over 20 years with the BBC, on BBC World News and BBC News.

Born 3 September 1952 and brought up in Burton upon Trent, Yates was educated at Manor House School, Ashby-de-la-Zouch and the former Burton Grammar School. Before deciding on journalism as a career Yates was a circuit DJ and was MD of his own entertainments company which managed clubs and pop groups.

Yates, under the pseudonym Al Kay, got his broadcasting break when he began a weekly Saturday morning pop show on Radio Derby in 1973. That same station offered him the chance to move away from music-based shows to speech programming. He was a current affairs and news host at BBC Local Radio stations in Derby, Leicester, and Birmingham.

He made his debut TV appearance at Pebble Mill in Birmingham in 1978 presenting news bulletins for BBC Midlands's regional news programme Midlands Today. Whilst at BBC Midlands, Yates was also a regional continuity announcer. He also appeared in some "Play for Today" dramas as himself; and hosted an inventions programme called Eureka. In 1980 he was at Grampian Television in Aberdeen, Scotland as presenter and reporter for North Tonight. In 1986 he was presenting Anglia Television's evening news show About Anglia.

Yates joined Sky Television from its launch in 1989, becoming the first male presenter on Sky News. In 1992 he helped to launch BBC World Service Television and stayed in his post for the re-launch to BBC World in 1995. In 1997 he was part of the launch team for BBC News 24 (now the BBC News Channel). He took a couple of years out from BBC News in 1998 to become an anchor on Deutsche Welle in Germany. He returned to the BBC in 2001, again to appear on both BBC World News and the BBC News Channel.

He was to return to radio in 2013 when he joined Global Radio to produce and present news for Classic FM and Smooth Radio.

Yates died on 26 July 2018.
