= The de Ferrers Academy =

Location
- St Mary's Drive; Burton Upon Trent, Staffordshire, DE13 0LL; England; 52°49′46″N 1°38′28″W

Information
- Type: Academy
- Motto: Work Hard, Be Kind, Choose Wisely
- Established: 1965 (1985 as de Ferrers)
- Local authority: Staffordshire
- Specialist: Technology College
- Department for Education URN: 136414 Tables
- Ofsted: Reports
- Principal: Alison Bickle
- Gender: Coeducational
- Age: 11 to 18
- Enrolment: 2,487(459 of which Sixth Formers)
- Colours: Bottle Green for Years 7-11; Silver and Black for Sixth Form (Years 12-13)
- Former name: Wulfric Comprehensive School
- Website: https://deferrers.com

The de Ferrers Academy (formerly De Ferrers Specialist Technology College) is a secondary school with academy status located in Burton upon Trent, Staffordshire, England.

== Admissions ==
The school is split into three Campuses. Dove campus for years 7-8 on Harehedge Lane, and Trent campus, for years 9,10,11, on St Mary's Drive and the new Sixth Form Campus for years 12-13. The school offered the International Baccalaureate Diploma Programme from 2008 until 2010 and replaced it with the AQA Baccalaureate.

The main campus, Trent, is in the west of Burton on Trent, north of Horninglow and west of the A38 in the parish of Horninglow and Eton. Dove, the other campus, is located less than a kilometre away in Outwoods, directly to the west. The third campus for Sixth Form, is located next to the town hall in Burton town centre.

== History ==
=== Former schools ===
It opened in 1965 as Dovecliff Grammar School on St Mary's Drive. Nearby was Horninglow Secondary Modern School on Harehedge Lane which opened in 1958.

=== Comprehensive ===
In 1975 it became the Wulfric Comprehensive School when the grammar and secondary modern schools merged under the headship of John "Jack" Atherton, with two separate sites.

It became known as the De Ferrers High School in 1985 when it merged with the Forest of Needwood High School in Rolleston on Dove. Forest of Needwood Secondary School had opened in 1963 as a secondary modern school and was named after Needwood Forest.

== Partnerships ==
Like many schools, De Ferrers is in close partnership with its feeder primary schools. Other schools partnered include the Catholic Collège Sacré Coeur, Ploermel.

== Academic performance ==
It gets above average results at GCSE, and at A-level.

The school has been awarded various awards for ICT, and won numerous sports competitions. The Academy has been running a 1:1 iPad programme since 2012, the first in Staffordshire. It became an Apple Regional Training Centre in 2013 and has been awarded recognition as an Apple Distinguished School in 2015-2017 and 2017-2019. In 2017 it was shortlisted for a TES Digital Innovation Award.

== Academy status ==
In late 2010 de Ferrers was offered the chance to fast-track into becoming an academy, due to its outstanding report from Ofsted. Although in short term this will have little effect, it will be an important development in the college's future. As well as de Ferrers, John Taylor High School were also offered the chance to become an academy and have accepted.

== Alumni ==
=== Dovecliff Grammar School ===
- Nigel Boddice MBE, Hon. ARAM, Trumpeter and conductor with the Royal Scottish Conservatoire.

=== de Ferrers Specialist Technology College ===
- Frazer Clarke, boxer
