= St John the Divine, Horninglow =

Coordinates: 52°48′26″N 01°38′35″W

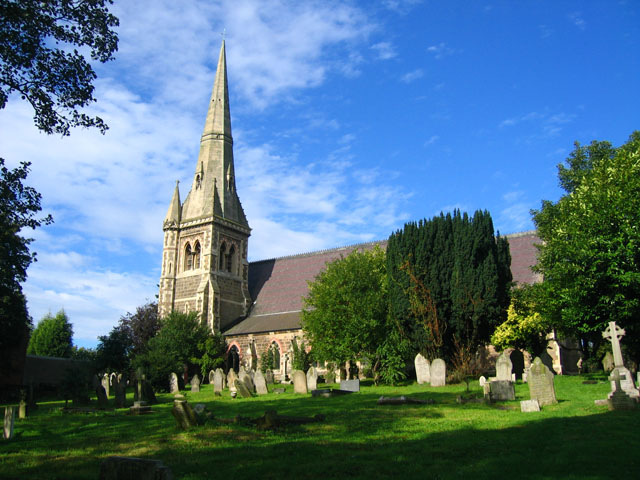
- St John the Divine, Horninglow
- Denomination: Church of England
- Churchmanship: Anglo Catholic
- Website: http://www.stjohnshorninglow.org.uk/

History
- Dedication: St John

Administration
- Province: Province of Canterbury
- Diocese: Diocese of Lichfield

Clergy
- Vicar: Prebendary Michael Freeman

St John the Divine is the Church of England parish church in the suburb of Horninglow, north west of Burton upon Trent, Staffordshire. It is part of the Diocese of Lichfield.

The church was built in 1866, designed by Edward Holmes in a Geometrical style. It consists of a chancel with north vestry, a nave of five bays, north and south aisles, and an engaged southwest tower with spire. It is built of brick faced externally with cream Coxbench stone and rendered internally with plaster and dressings of Bath stone. The nave arcades have octagonal piers with heavy, crocketed capitals and arches of blue York and red Alton stone in bands, and the high and wide chancel arch rests on corbels with short, detached stone shafts. The stained-glass east window, depicting the life of St John the Evangelist, is by William Warrington of London. The vestry was extended in 1911. The east end of the south aisle was fitted out as a Lady chapel in 1928 with a memorial window for Sarah Auden depicting St Chad and St Hilda with Celtic motifs. The font is at the west end. A peal of four steel bells was increased to six in 1875-6, but the current six bells are from Holy Trinity Church, Batley Carr in West Yorkshire and were installed in 1996. The rood screen was erected in memory of the 130 men of Horninglow killed in the First World War.

The churchyard contains the CWGC war graves of eleven service personnel of the First World War and six of the Second World War.

The first vicar of the church was John Auden, who died 23 November 1876. He was the father of George Augustus Auden and grandfather of W. H. Auden.
