= George Augustus Auden =

English physician, educator, and public official

- Born: 27 August 1872
- Died: 3 May 1957 (aged 84)
- Education: Christ's College, Cambridge; St Bartholomew's Hospital Medical College
- Children: 3, including W. H. Auden and John Bicknell Auden
- Medical career
- Profession: Researcher, educator and medical officer
- Institutions: York County Hospital; Birmingham University; British Army
- Sub-specialties: public health

George Augustus Auden (27 August 1872 – 3 May 1957) was an English physician, professor of public health, school medical officer, and writer on archaeological subjects.

== Biography ==
Auden was born at Horninglow, Burton-upon-Trent, the sixth son of John Auden, the first vicar of the Church of St John the Divine, and his wife Sarah Eliza, daughter of William Hopkins, of Dunstall, Staffordshire. The Audens were minor gentry with a strong clerical tradition, originally of Rowley Regis, which was then in Staffordshire.

He was educated at Repton and at Christ's College, Cambridge, taking a first-class degree in natural sciences in 1893. He studied medicine at St Bartholomew's Hospital Medical College, and qualified in medicine in 1896. He then held several medical appointments in London before moving to York, where he was physician at York County Hospital for fourteen years. His son W. H. Auden was born at 54 Bootham, York, in 1907, and in 1908 he moved to Birmingham, where he became the first School Medical Officer and Lecturer in Public Health at Birmingham University. Here he gained an international reputation as an innovative researcher and educator. During the First World War he served as a medical officer in the British Army in Egypt, Gallipoli, and France. He retired as School Medical Officer in 1937, but continued at the university and became Professor of Public Health in 1941.

He married Constance Rosalie Bicknell in 1899. They had three sons: Bernard, who became a farmer; the geologist John Bicknell Auden; and the poet W. H. Auden.

His archaeological interests are reflected in Historical and Scientific Survey of York and District (1906), which he edited, and to which he contributed the chapter on prehistoric archaeology.

Among his publications were:

- Historical and Scientific Survey of York and District (1906)
- "Heights and weights of Birmingham school children in relation to infant mortality". School Hygiene, 1910:290–91.
- "The Birmingham Open-Air School". The Medical Officer, 1912;7:253–55.
- "An experiment in the nutritive value of an extra milk ration". Journal of the Royal Sanitary Institute, 1923;44:236–47.
- "An unusual form of suicide" (on auto-erotic strangulation), Journal of Mental Science, 1927;73:428–31.

== Archives ==
A collection of archival material related to George Augustus Auden can be found at the Cadbury Research Library, University of Birmingham.
