= Abbot of Burton =

The Abbot of Burton was the head of Burton Abbey, the Benedictine monastery of St Mary and St Modwenna at Burton-upon-Trent in Staffordshire, England. Allegedly the church was begun by a wandering Irish holy woman, but it was actually founded c. 1003 as a Benedictine abbey by Wulfric Spott. A continuous series of abbots, which slight possible interruptions, can be traced thereafter until the English Reformation.

== List of abbots ==
Abbots of the church of Burton
| Incumbent | From | Until | Citation(s) | Notes |
|---|---|---|---|---|
| Wulfgeat | c. 1004 | c. 1026 | | The Annals of Burton state he died Thursday 20 April 1026, after 22 years in office. This date was in fact a Wednesday, though 20 April 1027 fell on a Thursday, meaning that the source was out by a year his abbacy lasted from c. 1005 to 1027. |
| Brihtric I | c. 1027 | c. 1050 | | The Annals of Burton state he died Saturday 20 April 1050, after 24 years in office. This date was in fact a Friday. |
| Leofric | c. 1051 | 1066 | | Also Abbot of Peterborough (1052–1066), as well as Coventry, Crowland, and Thorney, he was the nephew of Leofric, Earl of Mercia. |
| Brihtric II | c. 1067 | 1085 | | Previously Abbot of Malmesbury, he was appointed by William the Conqueror soon after Abbot Leofric's death in either 31 October or 1 November 1066. |
| Geoffrey de Mala Terra | 1085 | 1094 | | He was expelled from his position in 1094. |
| Nigel | 1094 | 1114 | | |
| Geoffrey | 1114 | 1150 | | |
| Robert I | 1150 | 1159 | | He was expelled in 1159, but returned in 1176. |
| Bernard | 1160 | 1174 | | Previously Abbot of Cerne |
| Robert I (again) | 1176 | | | Previously Abbot of Cerne |
| Roger Malebranche | 1177 | 1182 | | |
| Richard | 1182 | 1187 | | |
| Nicholas | 1187 | 1197 | | |
| William Melburne | 1200 | 1213 | | |
| Stephen de Lucy | 1214 | | | Elected but resigned in January 1214 |
| Roger | 1214 | 1216 | | |
| Nicholas de Wallingford | 1216 | 1222 | | |
| Richard de Insula | 1222 | 1229 | | |
| Laurence de St Edward | 1229 | 1260 | | |
| John de Stafford | 1260 | 1281 | | |
| Thomas de Packington | 1281 | 1305 | | |
| John de Burton | 1305 | 1316 | | |
| William de Bromley | 1316 | 1329 | | |
| Robert de Langdon | 1329 | 1340 | | |
| Robert de Brykhull | 1340 | 1347 | | |
| John of Ibestock | 1347 | 1366 | | |
| Thomas of Southam | 1366 | 1400 | | |
| John de Sudbury | 1400 | 1424 | | |
| William Matthewe | 1424 | 1430 | | |
| Robert Ownesby | 1430 | 1433 | | |
| Ralph Henley | 1433 | 1455 | | |
| William de Bronston | 1455 | 1473 | | |
| Thomas de Felde | 1473 | 1493 | | |
| William Fleghe | 1493 | 1502 | | |
| William Beyne | 1502 | 1530 x 1531 | | Associated with Abbot Beyne School |
| William Benson | 1531 | 1533 | | Became Abbot of Westminster |
| John Beaton | 1533 | 1534 | | |
| William Edys | 1534 | 1539 | | Surrendered the abbey as part of the dissolution of the monasteries |
