= Listed buildings in Horninglow and Eton =

Horninglow and Eton is a civil parish in the district of East Staffordshire, Staffordshire, England. It contains six listed buildings that are recorded in the National Heritage List for England. Of these, one is listed at Grade I, the highest of the three grades, and the others are at Grade II, the lowest grade. The parish is to the northwest of Burton upon Trent and is mainly residential. The most important listed building is St Chad's Church, and the war memorial in its churchyard is also listed. Remainders of the parish's industrial past are a former hydraulic power house and a former railway warehouse. The other listed buildings are a farmhouse and a milepost.

== Key ==
Grade	Criteria
I	Buildings of exceptional interest, sometimes considered to be internationally important
II	Buildings of national importance and special interest

== Buildings ==
Name and location	Photograph	Date	Notes	Grade
The Chestnuts; 52.82424°N 1.64571°W	—	Mid 18th century	A farmhouse that was extended and altered in about 1800 and 1870. It is in red brick on a plinth, with a band, dentilled eaves and a tile roof. The main block has two storeys, an attic and cellars, and there are wings at the right, the left, and at the rear. In the ground floor is a canted bay window to the left and a doorway with a fanlight, and a rustic porch with a hipped slate roof to the right. The windows are a mix of sashes and casements.	II
Milepost at the Royal Oak Inn; 52.81987°N 1.64043°W		c. 1828	The milepost is in cast iron, and has a triangular section and an inclined head. It is inscribed with "HORNINGLOW PARISH", and the distances to London, Tutbury and Burton.	II
Former hydraulic power house 52.81501°N 1.63252°W		Late 19th century	The former hydraulic power house is in red brick with a slate roof. There is one storey and five bays, a central accumulator tower with three recessed panels, and a lower three-bay range to the left.	II
Pickford's Bonded Warehouse; 52.81389°N 1.63414°W		Late 19th century	The warehouse was built by the Midland Railway, it is in red brick with a slate roof, and has four storeys and 18 bays. The windows are cast iron casements with segmental heads. At the front is an enclosed siding, and a weatherboarded hoist with a hipped roof. On the sides are painted inscriptions relating to the Midland Railway and to the London, Midland and Scottish Railway.	II
St Chad's Church; 52.81725°N 1.63632°W		1903	The church was designed by George Frederick Bodley in Decorated style, and was completed in 1910 by Cecil Hare. It is built in stone, and consists of a nave, north and south aisles, a chancel with a south chapel and a polygonal vestry, and a detached tower at the northwest joined to the body of the church by a vaulted passage. Inside the chapel is a reredos designed by Bodley.	I
St Chad War Memorial; 52.81734°N 1.63652°W	—	c. 1920	The war memorial is in a circular paved area in the churchyard of St Chad's Church. It is in sandstone, and consists of a cross fleury on a collared shaft. It has a base of two octagonal steps and a pedestal. On the shaft is a niche containing a carving, and on the pedestal are four niches, each containing a religious figure. There are inscriptions relating to both World Wars on the top step of the base.	II

== See also ==
- Listed buildings in Burton (civil parish)
