= Horninglow =

Suburb of Burton upon Trent, England

Coordinates: 52.8260°N 1.6400°W

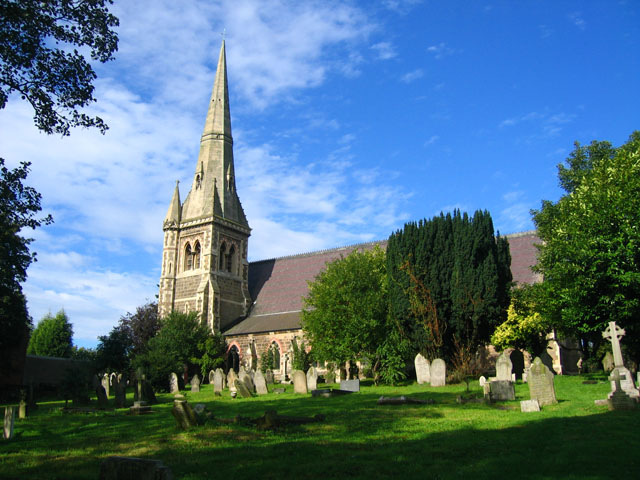
- St John the Divine, Horninglow

- Location within Staffordshire
- OS grid reference: SK244250
- Civil parish: Horninglow and Eton
- District: East Staffordshire
- Shire county: Staffordshire
- Region: West Midlands
- Country: England
- Sovereign state: United Kingdom
- Post town: BURTON-ON-TRENT
- Postcode district: DE13
- Dialling code: 01283
- Police: Staffordshire
- Fire: Staffordshire
- Ambulance: West Midlands
- UK Parliament: Burton

Horninglow is a suburb of Burton upon Trent, in the East Staffordshire district, in the county of Staffordshire, England. Horninglow lies to the north west of Burton, and is linked to the town centre by the A511. It forms part of the civil parish of Horninglow and Eton.

== History ==
Horninglow is one of the older parishes, shown on maps as early as 1770. Over time its development has increased the size of the area to its current layout.

The Church of England parish church of Horninglow is St John the Divine, part of the Diocese of Lichfield. The building dates from 1866; the architect was Edward Holmes of Birmingham.

A United Free Methodist mission chapel was opened in Carlton Street in 1898 and now houses the local doctor's surgery. St Thomas Methodist Church on Belvedere Road dates from 1907.

In recent years, Horninglow has become a popular place to live with a wide variety of housing. Horninglow's one Grade II listed building, the Chestnuts farmhouse on Horninglow Road North, was being developed with barns being converted to residential accommodation as of 2008.

== Education ==
Horninglow has a number of schools at both the primary and secondary school level. Primary schools include Horninglow Primary: A De Ferrers trust academy, Outwoods Primary School (formerly Castle Park Infants School and William Hutson Junior School), Lansdowne Infant School, Eton Park Junior School, Belvedere Junior School and St Modwen's Roman Catholic Primary School.

The secondary school in Horninglow is the De Ferrers Academy, which is split between two sites, the Dove Campus in Harehedge Lane and the Trent Campus in St Mary's Drive. De Ferrers was recognised as good with outstanding features by Ofsted in April 2012.

== Civil parish ==
Horninglow was formerly a township in the parish of Burton-upon-Trent, from 1866 Horninglow was a civil parish in its own right, on 31 March 1904 the parish was abolished and merged with Burton upon Trent. In 1901 the parish had a population of 16,857.

== Notable people ==
- George Augustus Auden (1872 – 1957), physician and writer on archaeology
- Alan Mellor (born 1959), cricketer

== See also ==
- Horninglow railway station
- Listed buildings in Horninglow and Eton
