= Bob Plant =

- Born: Arthur Blurton Plant; 28 July 1915; Burton upon Trent, Staffordshire, England, UK
- Died: 18 April 2011 (aged 95); Wolverhampton, West Midlands, England, UK
- Military career
- Allegiance: United Kingdom
- Branch: British Army
- Service years: 1939–1945
- Rank: Captain
- Nickname: Bob
- Service number: 148214
- Unit: Royal Artillery
- Battles: World War II; Battle of Monte Cassino
- Awards: Legion of Merit (1943); Military Cross (1944)

Arthur Blurton "Bob" Plant, MC (28 July 1915 – 18 April 2011) was an officer in the British Army who was awarded the Military Cross for his actions at Tufo in 1944, during the Battle of Monte Cassino.

== Early life ==
Plant was born in Burton upon Trent on 28 July 1915. He was educated at Burton Grammar School.

== Military service ==
Plant joined the British Army in September 1939, and twelve months later received a commission in the Royal Artillery. After serving in Syria, he took part in the Allied invasion of Sicily with 91st Field Regiment RA, and was awarded the Legion of Merit for his assistance of the U.S. 133rd Infantry in Scapoli, southern Italy.

Plant was awarded the Military Cross for his actions at Tufo on 21 January 1944, during the Battle of Monte Cassino. Holding the high ground in the rocky region by the Garigliano river, as British troops tried to break through the German southern flank to clear the way for the Allied landings at Anzio (Operation Shingle), Plant's company was outnumbered and their positions twice overrun by German forces, with Plant eventually wounded and captured. When the German medic treating his wounds was killed by a British shell, Plant took the opportunity to escape and made his way through his own regiment's bombardment to rejoin his company, where he praised them for their "terrifying" barrage.

== Later life ==
Following his recovery, Plant was demobilised from the army and worked as a sales director for Mander Brothers in Wolverhampton. He died, aged 95, on 18 April 2011.
