= Auden Schendler =

American businessman, climate activist

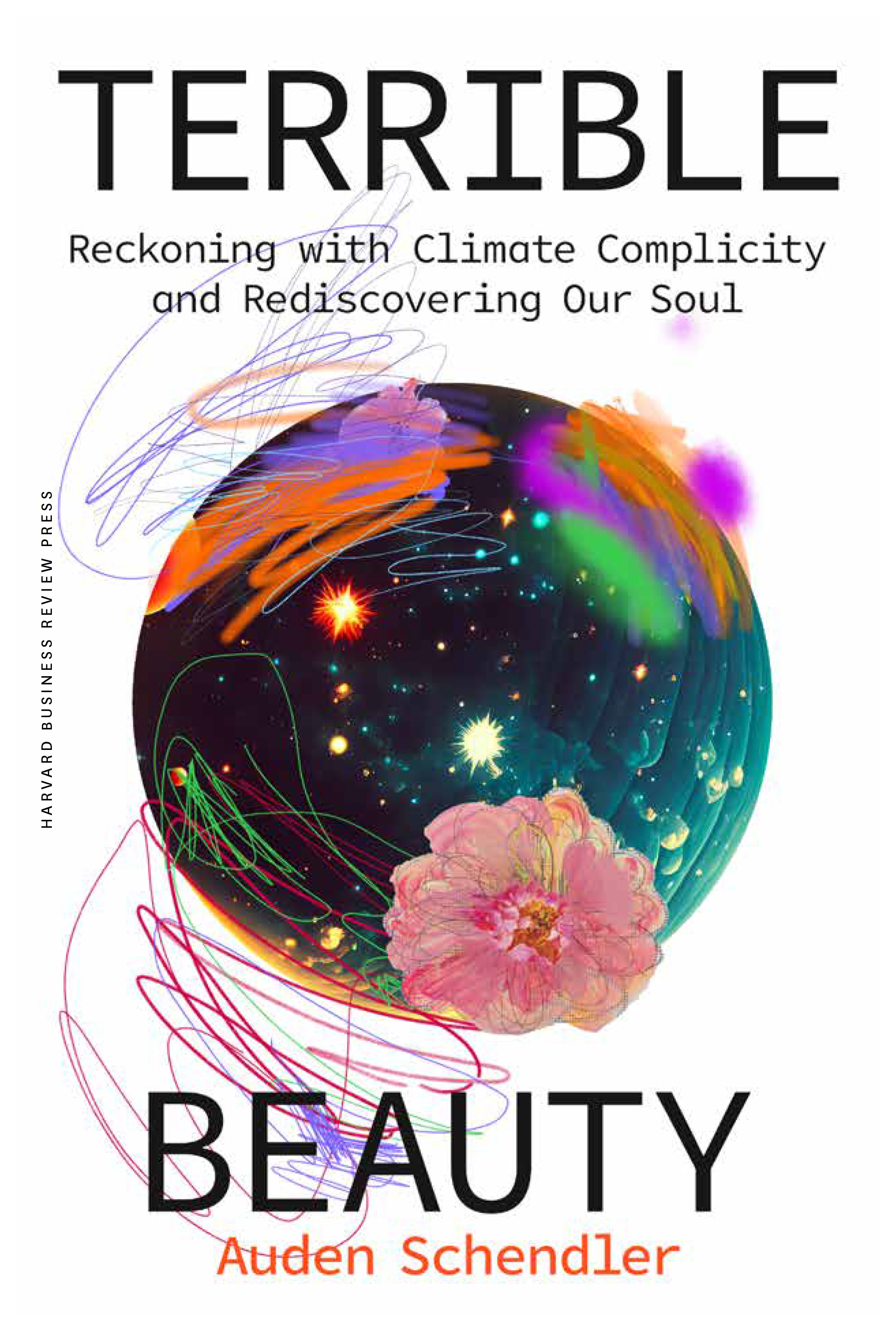
Terrible Beauty

Auden Schendler is a Colorado-based climate activist and author. His books include Getting Green Done: Hard Truths from the Front Lines of the Sustainability Revolution (2009), and Terrible Beauty: Reckoning with Climate Complicity and Rediscovering Our Soul (2024). He ran sustainability programs at Aspen Skiing Company (now Aspen One) for 26 years before stepping down in May of 2025. Aspen One. His website is www.audenschendler.com.

Schendler has written extensively about the failure of the modern environmental movement, and its complicity with the fossil fuel economy status quo. Early in his career he documented the difficulties of enacting sustainability initiatives in the business world and the ineffectiveness of conventional green business practices in the face of climate change. His writing has been published frequently in the New York Times, the L.A. Times, and Harvard Business Review. His latest work is about the gap between what we say we care about as parents and citizens, and how we respond—or don't--to a threat to all those things: climate change. He has been featured in Men's Journal, Businessweek, Outside, Fast Company Harvard Business Review, Slate, and Scientific American's Earth 3.0.

He has published numerous essays on climate change, politics, parenting, and the outdoors and speaks regularly about climate change and what constitutes meaningful action. At Aspen One Schendler was part of a team that developed several innovative utility-scale clean energy systems, including a microhydroelectric plant, a solar photovoltaic farm, and a coal mine methane-to-electricity project, the first of its kind west of the Mississippi.

The bulk of Auden's work is around scale solutions to climate change, primarily through movement building, policy, and power wielding from the business world. Auden served on the board of Protect Our Winters for a decade, as the organization grew from a hundred-thousand-dollar budget to four million and beyond. He has helped enact climate legislation—including rules on methane leakage, HFCs, and clean cars—as a Governor-appointed commissioner on Colorado's Air Quality Control Commission. He was elected to Basalt, Colorado's town council in 2016 and served through 2020.

Auden previously worked at Rocky Mountain Institute in corporate sustainability as the field was just evolving. He has also worked as an ambulance medic, Forest Service Goose nest island builder in Alaska, High School math and English teacher, ski instructor, trailer insulator, Outward Bound instructor, auction-company junk sorter, and Bobcat driver. An avid outdoorsman, he has climbed Denali, North America's highest peak, kayaked the grand canyon in winter, and ascended Mt. Rainier's Liberty Ridge. He lives in Basalt, Colorado with his family.
