= John Bicknell Auden =

British geologist (1903–1991)

- Born: 14 December 1903; York, Yorkshire, England
- Died: 21 January 1991 (aged 87); London, England
- Occupations: geologist; explorer

John Bicknell Auden (14 December 1903 – 21 January 1991) was an English geologist and explorer, older brother of the poet W. H. Auden, who worked for many years in India with the Geological Survey of India and later with the Food and Agriculture Organization. He studied the Himalayan strata, particularly the Krol Belt where he recognized rocks from the Peninsula thrusting north into the Himalayas. He also studied groundwater and was involved in studying the geology of many dam sites in India. Auden's Col is named after him.

== Biography ==
Auden was born at 54 Bootham in York, the second son of George Augustus Auden with Constance Rosalie née Bicknell (1869–1941) and was an older brother of the poet W. H. Auden. He was educated along with his younger brother Wystan at St Edmund's School, Hindhead, a Surrey prep school, after his father moved to teach public health at Birmingham. He excelled in French, English and the classics and being bespectacled earned the nickname of "dodo". He later studied at Marlborough College (1917 to 1922), and geology at Christ's College, Cambridge receiving a BA in 1936 after which he joined the Geological Survey of India, where he remained until he retired in the early 1950s. Like his brother he wrote poetry at college and was described as an extreme neurotic and suffered from depression in the early 1930s. He received an MA in 1930 and an Sc.D. in 1948.

== Geology in India ==
Auden took an interest in the Vindhyan formations and the Himalayas and lectured on glaciers at The Himalayan Club in 1936. His exploration and mapping (with three other climbers) of the high Karakoram and Anghil region of the Himalayas was the subject of Eric Shipton's Blank on the Map (1938). He is credited to the discovery of Salkhan Fossils Park in 1929, which contains stromatolites.

In 1929 he visited his younger brother Wystan in Berlin and talked to him about K2 which served as inspiration for a play, The Ascent of F6. One of Auden's early interests was in the Krol Belts. This early stratigraphy work in the mid-1930s on the Himalayas was however something he could not continue work on after moving into economic geology following the war. He noted significantly that "Aravalli strikes found locally in rock structures in the Garhwal Himalaya /.. suggests a northward extension of Peninsular rocks into the Himalaya." In 1940 he was elected president of the Geological Institute of Presidency College, Calcutta. In 1937 Auden learned to pilot an aircraft and conducted an aerial survey of the Bijaigarh shales. In 1945–51, he was engaged in investigating all the major dam sites, hydro electric projects, irrigation works and water supply schemes of India. He became an acclaimed expert on groundwater in the Kutch and Rajasthan region.

The Geological Survey of India offered the position of a director to Auden in 1953 but he declined it on the grounds of health and also pointed out that it would be only right for an Indian to lead (who would be M.S. Krishnan) it. After retiring from the Geological Survey of India (he was the last European to be recruited into it and the last European to leave the organization) he joined the Sudan geological survey from 1953 for two years and for four years with the Burmah Oil Company.In 1960 he joined the Food and Agriculture Organization, where he worked until 1970. After retiring he lived in London, at Thurloe Square close to the Victoria and Albert Museum and served for two years as vice-president of the Geological Society of London. He was awarded the gold medal of the Asiatic Society in 1953 and the Darashaw Nosherwanji Wadia medal of the Indian National Science Academy in 1980.

== Personal life ==
The milieu of Auden and his generation of explorers forms the central narrative of The Last Englishmen: Love, War, and the End of Empire, a historical book by Deborah Baker.

Auden married twice, first to Margaret Marshall who was interested in psychology and initially a counsellor for Auden. She suggested that his depression would improve if he did not return to India. After the death of Margaret's husband, Douglas Marshall, she married John in 1930 and went to India. John found Margaret domineering, unfaithful and a spendthrift and they separated in January 1932, divorcing in October 1933. He married Sheila Bonnerjee, a granddaughter of a founding president of the Indian National Congress Womesh Chandra Bonnerjee, in 1940 and they had two daughters. The family lived in London and Calcutta where he resigned from the Saturday and Tollygunge clubs as his wife would not be admitted.

He converted from Anglican to Roman Catholicism in 1951,. He died in London on 21 January 1991. According to his requests, he was cremated and a Mass was held on the 29th at Westminster Cathedral. Further to his request, his ashes were immersed in the Ganges at Rishikesh on 14 December 1991.

== Publications ==
- Auden, J. B. (1933) "On the age of certain Himalayan granites". Records of Geological Survey of India, 66(4), 461–471.
- Auden, J. B. (1933). "Vindhyan sedimentation in the Son Valley, Mirzapur district". Office of the Geological survey of India.
- Gilbert, L. B., & Auden, J. B. (1933). "Note on a Glacier In the Arwa valley. British Garhwal." Records of Geological Survey of India, 66(3), 214–278.
- Auden, J. B. (1934) "The geology of the Krol belt". Records of Geological Survey of India, 67(4):357–454.
- Auden, J. B. (1935) "Traverses in the Himalaya". Records of Geological Survey of India, 69(2):123–167.
- Auden, J. B. (1935). "The snout of the Biafo glacier in Baltistan". Records of Geological Survey of India, 68(4), 400–413.
- Auden, J. B., & Ghosh, A. M. N. (1935). "Preliminary Account of the Earthquake of the 15th January, 1934, in Bihar and Nepal". Records of the Geological Survey of India, 68(2).
- Auden, J.B. (1937). "Snout of the Gangotri glacier, Tehri Garhwal". Records of Geological Survey of India, 72/2:135-140.
- Auden, J.B. (1937) "The Structure of the Himalaya in Garhwal." Records of Geological Survey of India Vol. 71, pp. 407–433.
- Shipton, E., Spender, M., & Auden, J. B. (1938). "The Shaksgam Expedition, 1937." Geographical Journal, 313–336.
- Auden, J. B. (1938). Résumé of geological results, Shaksgam Expedition, 1937. Himal. J, 10, 40–48.
- Wadia, D. N., & Auden, J. B. (1939). Geology and structure of Northern India. Mem. Geol. Surv. India, 73, 118–137.
- Dunn, J. A., Auden, J. B., & Ghosh, A. M. N. (1939). Earthquake effects. Memoir Geological Survey of India, 73, 27–48.
- Auden, J. B. (1942). A Geological Investigation of Tunnel Alignments for the Jumna Hydro-Electric Scheme.
- Auden, J. B. (1941). An excursion to Gangotri. Himalayan Journal, 8, 96–102.
- Auden, J. B. (1942). Note on the Kalagarh Landslide-Mussoorie-Dehradun Motor Road. Rec. Geol. Surv. Ind, 77.
- Auden, J. B. (1948). Notes on earthquakes in relation to Damodar Valley Projects.
- Auden, J. B. (1949). A geological discussion on the Satpura hypothesis and Garo-Rajmahal gap. In Proc. Natl. Inst. Sci. of India (Vol. 15, p. 55).
- Auden, J. B. (1949). Note on the earthquake tremors at Shahkot, Sheikhupura district, Punjab, of September 1943. Records Geol. Surv. India, 78, 135–140.
- Auden, J. B. (1949). Note on the earthquake tremors at Shahkot, Sheikhupura district, Punjab, of September 1943. Records Geol. Surv. India, 78, 135–140.
- Auden, J. B. (1950). Some factors concerning the transport of sediments of rivers. In Proc. Natl. Inst. Sci. India (Vol. 16, No. 6).
- Taylor, G. C Jr., and Auden, J. B. (1952) All-India exploratory well drilling programme and location of exploratory wells: India Geol. Survey rept., 13
- Auden, J. B. (1952). Some geological and chemical aspects of the Rajasthan salt problem. Bull. Nat. Inst. Sci. Ind, 1, 53–67.
- Auden, J. B., & Saha, A. K. (1952). Geological notes on central Nepal. Records of the Geological survey of India, 82, 354–357.
- Auden, J. B. (1954). Erosional patterns and fracture zones in Peninsular India. Geological Magazine, 91(02), 89–101.
- Auden, J. B. (1959). Earthquakes in relation to the Damodar Valley Project. In Proc. Symp. Earthquake Engg (Vol. 1).
- Auden, J. B. (1960). Note on gypsum near Lachhmanjhula and Sahasradhara, Uttar Pradesh. Rec. Geol. Surv. Ind., 86 (2).
- Auden, J. B. (1972). Review of the tectonic map of India published by ONGC. J. Geol. Soc. India, 13, 101–107.
- Auden, J. B. (1972). Discussion of KG Cox, The Karroo volcanic cycle: Geol. Soc. London Jour, 128, 334.
- Auden, J. B. (1972). Seismicity and reservoirs. Comments Earth Sci., Geophys, 2, 149–150.
- Auden, J. B. (1975). Seismicity associated with the Koyna reservoir, Maharashtra.
- Auden, J. B. (1981). India's former crustal neighbours. Indian National Science Academy.
- Auden, J. B. (1999). Dykes in western India. A discussion of their relationships with the Deccan Traps. Memoirs of the Geological Society of India (2):277–318.
