= Auden's Col =

High altitude pass in Garhwal Himalayas

- Interactive map of Auden's Col
- Elevation: 5,490 m (18,010 ft)

Location
- Location: Uttarkashi district, Garhwal division, Uttarakhand, India
- Range: Garhwal Himalaya, Greater Himalayas
- Coordinates: 30.8735°N 78.8920°E

Auden's Col is a high altitude mountain pass connecting Rudugaira valley and Bhilangna valley in India. It is situated at 5,490 metres (18,010 ft) elevation and connects the ridge coming from Gangotri III (6580 m) peak on the north-west and the ridge coming from Jogin I (6465 m) on the east, and also binds a glacier coming from Jogin I on the north side of Rudugaira valley, and deadly Khatling glacier on the south side of Bhilangna valley.

Rudra ganga stream or Rudragairu (gairu means deep) or Rudugaira gad drains Rudugaira glacier and eventually flows into Bhagirathi (Ganga) river near Gangotri, and Bhilangna river originates from Khatling glacier and meets Bhagirathi near Old Tehri.

== History ==
The pass is named after John Bicknell Auden of the Geological Survey of India, who first discovered it in 1935 and crossed it in 1939. Mr Harish Kapadia and Mr Romesh Bhattacharjee from the Himalayan Club repeated Auden's explorations in the late eighties.

== Trekking ==
Auden's Col is a challenging mountain pass in the Garhwal Himalaya, with numerous crevasses on the pass and the adjoining Khatling glacier. A trekking route crosses Col and Mayali Pass, connecting Gangotri with Kedarnath, both important Hindu pilgrimage sites.
