= List of people from Burton upon Trent =

This is a list of people born in or otherwise associated with Burton upon Trent in Staffordshire, England. People are listed alphabetically within their category of work.

== Arts people ==
=== Music ===
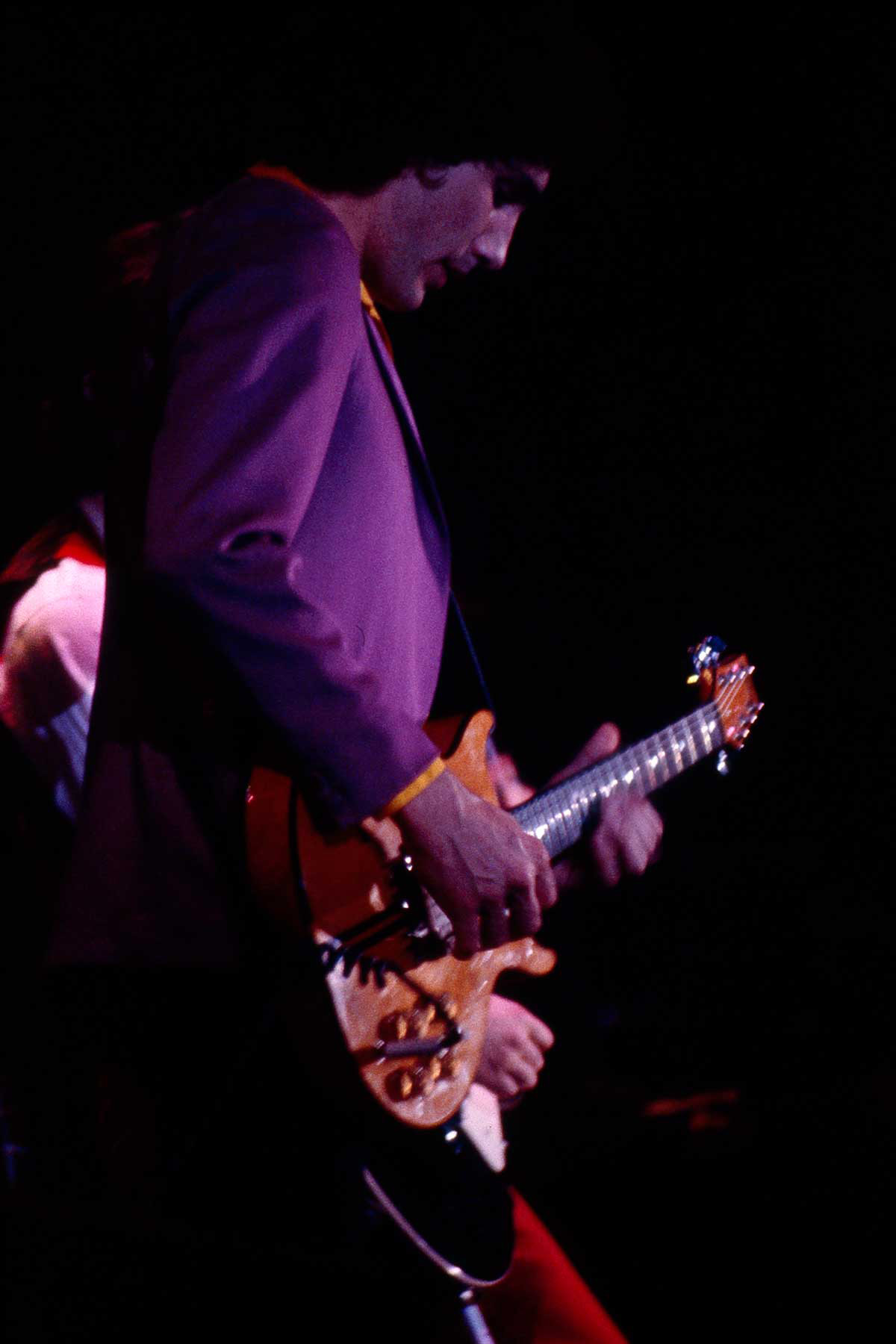
Mick Dyche

- Nigel Boddice (1952-2022), trumpet player and conductor
- Nathan Dawe (born 1994) DJ and producer from Stretton.
- Mick Dyche (1951-2018), guitarist
- Henry Wellington Greatorex (1816-1858), musician
- Christian Hardy (b. 1979), musician
- Paul Harvey (born 1960) a British musician and Stuckist artist
- Nick Hemming, musician
- Joe Jackson, (born 1954) an English musician and singer-songwriter
- Mabel Mercer (1900–1984), Jazz and Cabaret singer
- Phil Seamen, (1926–1972), jazz drummer, who played and recorded with many famous jazz musicians

=== Other ===
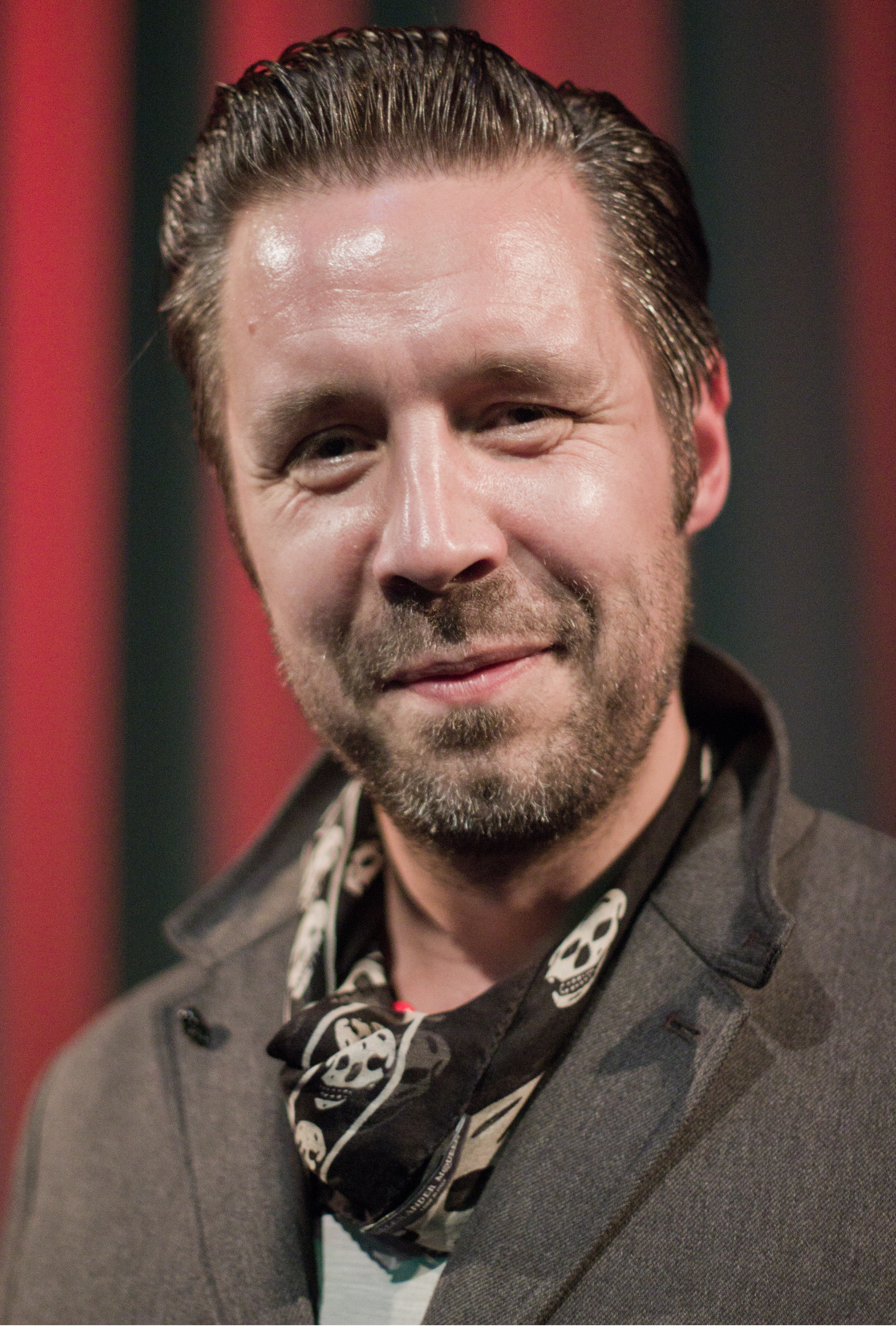
Paddy Considine, 2011

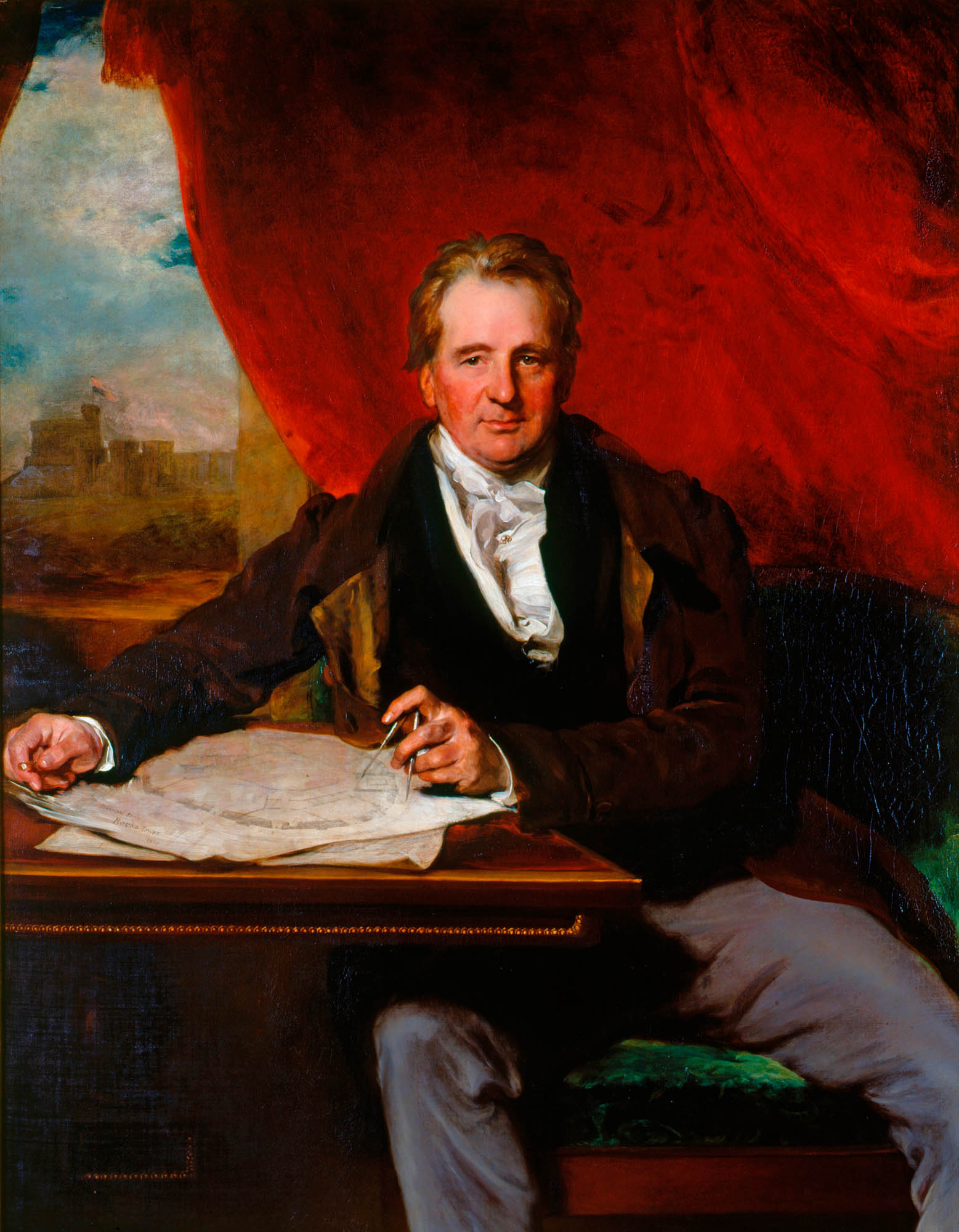
Sir Jeffry Wyatville, 1828

- Jean Aubrey (1932-2008), actress
- Philip Bond, (1934–2017) actor, played Albert Frazer in the 1970s BBC nautical drama The Onedin Line
- Rosalyn Boulter (1916–1997), actress, George Formby's co-star in George In Civvy Street as well as many British films
- Isaac Hawkins Browne (1705–1760) politician, poet, and MP for Much Wenlock 1744–1754, friend of Samuel Johnson
- Bill Buckley (b. 1959) actor and radio presenter
- Paddy Considine, (born 1973), actor, film director, screenwriter, and musician
- Luca Gallone, (born 1996) magician
- Judy Gunn (1915-1991), actress
- Pearl Hackney (1916-2009), actress
- Disley Jones (1926-2005), stage and film designer
- Alison Lapper (born 1965) an English artist, member of the Association of Mouth and Foot Painting Artists of the World
- Francis Graham Lodge (1908-2002), artist
- David Macaulay, (born 1946), illustrator and writer
- Arthur Mayger Hind (1880–1957), art historian and Keeper of the Department of Prints, British Museum, 1933–1945
- Anna Passey, (born 1984), actress
- Jean Sprackland (b. 1962), poet
- Malcolm Tod (1897-1968), actor
- Tom Weston-Jones (b. 1987), actor
- Sir Jeffry Wyatville (1766–1840) an English architect and garden designer, made alterations and extensions to Chatsworth House and Windsor Castle.
- Stuart Farrimond, physician, researcher, and best-selling author who was a frequent BBC radio and BBC television science communicator; born in the town.

== Business people ==
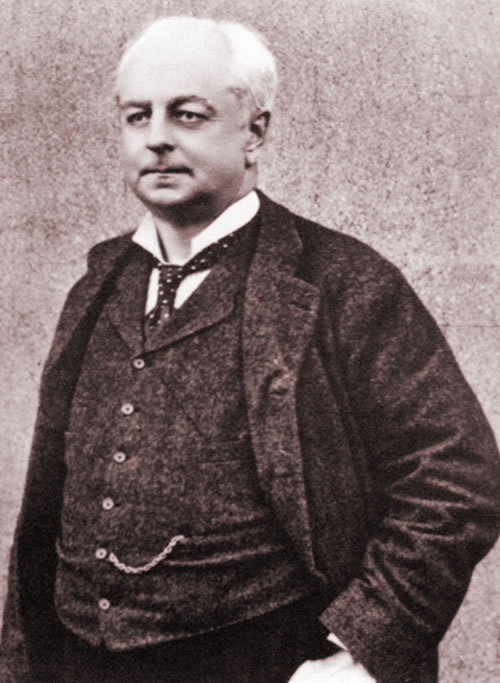
Michael Arthur Bass

- Henry Allsopp, 1st Baron Hindlip (1811-1887), brewer
- Samuel Allsopp, 2nd Baron Hindlip (1842-1897), brewer
- Hamar Bass (1842-1898), brewer
- Michael Arthur Bass, 1st Baron Burton (1837–1909), industrialist, politician and philanthropist, member of the Bass brewing dynasty.
- Michael Thomas Bass (1760–1827), brewer
- Michael Thomas Bass (1794-1884), brewer
- William Bass, (1717–1787) founder of the brewery business of Bass & Co in Burton in 1777
- Sir William Bass, 2nd Baronet (1879–1952) a British racehorse owner and supporter of the early British film industry
- Sir Stanley Clarke, (1933–2004) businessman (St. Modwen Properties plc) and racecourse owner
- Lieutenant Colonel James Herbert Porter (1892–1973); creator of Newcastle Brown Ale
- Calvert Worthington (1830-1871), brewer

== Military figures ==
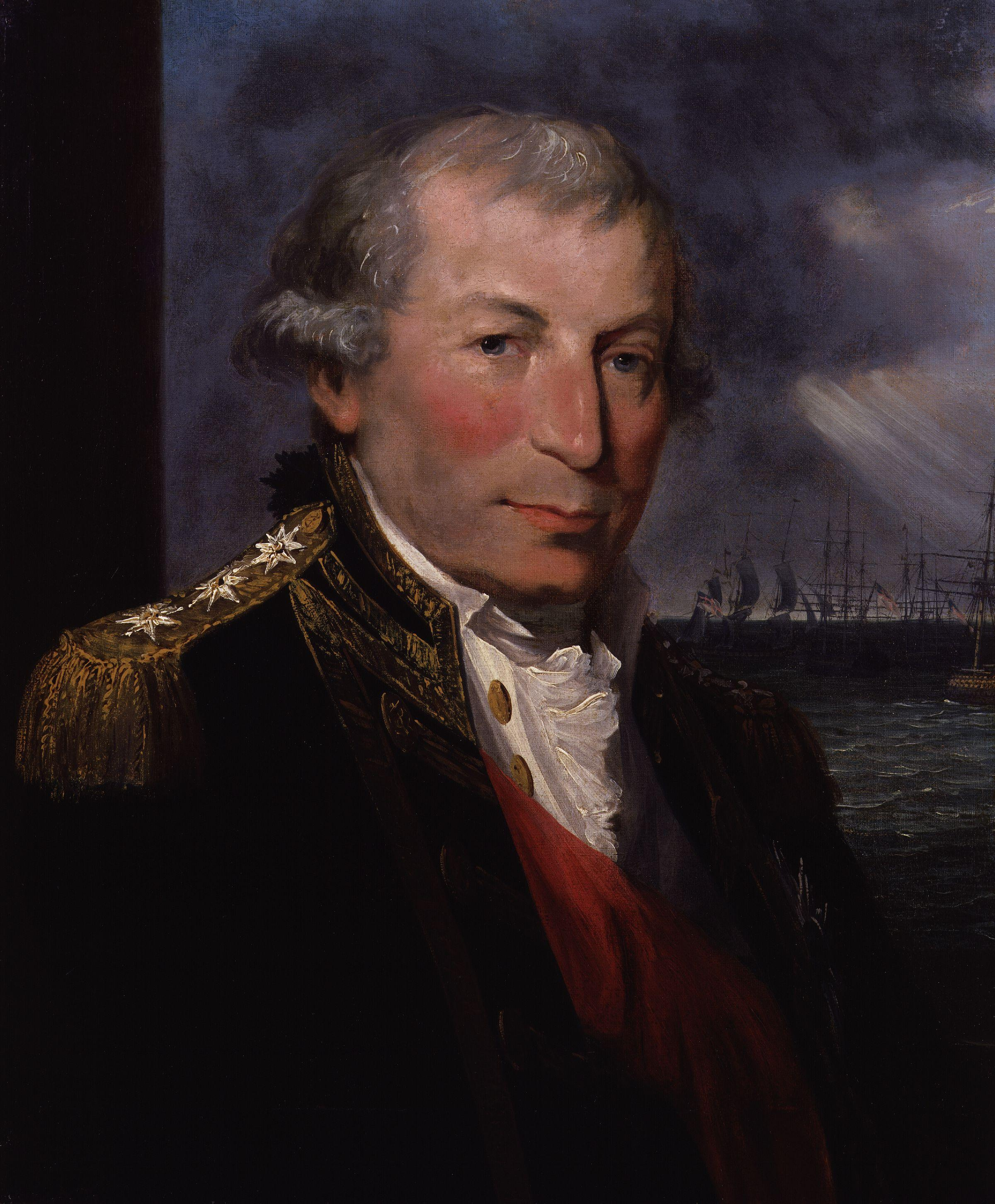
John Jervis

- Graham Bladon (1899-1967), RAF officer
- William Bottrill (1892-1971), RAF officer
- Thomas Byard (1743-1798), Royal Navy officer
- William Harold Coltman (1891–1974) recipient of the Victoria Cross
- Arthur William Hammond (1890-1959), RAF officer
- John Jervis, 1st Earl of St Vincent, (1735–1823) Admiral of the Fleet studied at Burton Grammar School from 1745 to 1749.
- Bob Plant (1915-2011) British Army officer
- Brigadier Mike Stone (born 1953) a retired British Army officer, former Director of Information of the British Army and former Chief Information Officer of the Ministry of Defence
- Thomas Erskine Wardle (1877-1944), Royal Navy officer

== Politicians ==
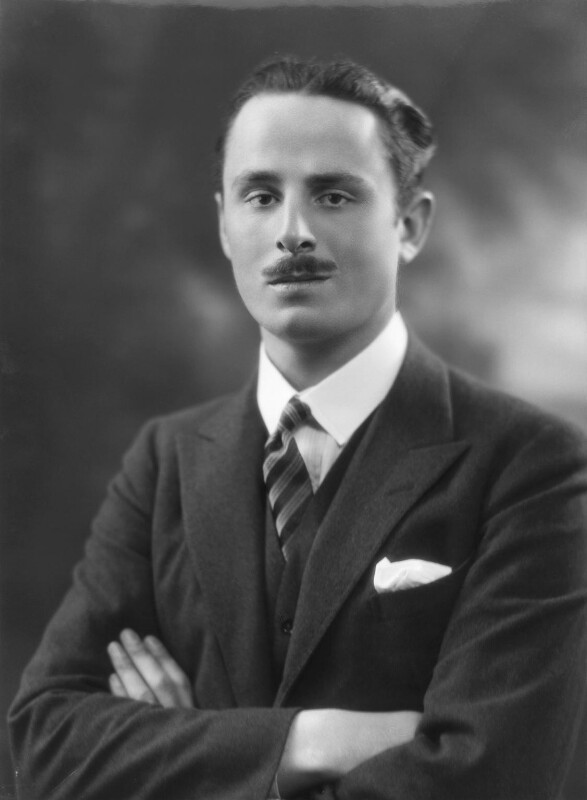
Oswald Mosley

- William Banfield (1875-1945) Labour MP for Wednesbury
- Andrew Bridgen MP (born 1964), Former Conservative Party and Reclaim Party MP for North West Leicestershire. Brexiteer.
- Jacob Collier (b. 1997), Labour MP for Burton and Uttoxeter
- David Curry (b. 1944) Conservative MP for Skipton and Ripon
- Christine Grahame MSP (born 1944), SNP politician and Deputy Presiding Officer of the Scottish Parliament
- John Gretton, 1st Baron Gretton (1867–1947) businessman, Conservative MP for Burton 1918–1943 and gold medallist at the 1900 Summer Olympics
- John Gretton, 2nd Baron Gretton (1902-1982), MP for Burton
- Kate Kniveton, (born 1971), Conservative MP for Burton from 2019–2024
- Harold Lawrence (1887-1953), member of Legislative Assembly of Manitoba
- Oswald Mosley (1896-1980), British far-right politician
- Alfred Newbould (1873-1952), Labour politician
- Thomas Swain (1911-1979), Labour MP for North East Derbyshire
- Henry Wardle (1832-1892), Liberal MP for Derbyshire SOuth
- Daniel Watson (c.1617–1683) an English lawyer and politician, a captain of dragoons in the Derbyshire cavalry, a J.P. and he acquired and lived in Nether Hall
- Judyth Watson (1940-2023), Member of the Western Australian Legislative Assembly
- Tom Wood, pseudonym of Tom Hinshelwood, fiction writer

== Religious figures ==
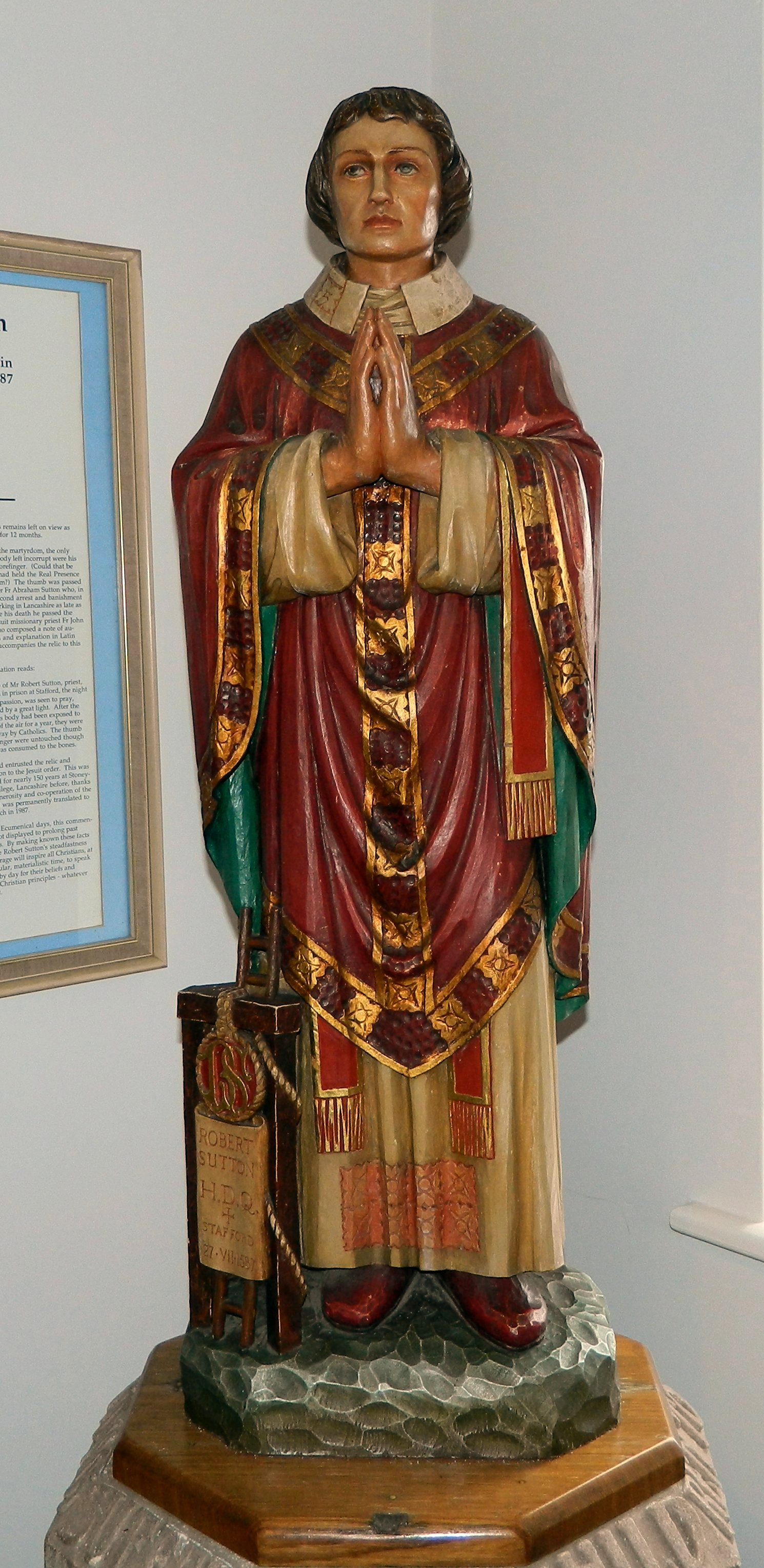
Statue of Blessed Robert Sutton

- Charles John Fynes Clinton (1799-1872), clergyman and classicist
- Anthony Emery (1918-1988), Catholic bishop
- Valpy French (1825-1891) Christian missionary
- Samuel Middleton (priest) (1884-1964), Anglican priest
- Katherine Stubbes (1570/71-1590), subject of the religious tract A Chrystall Glasse for Christian Women
- Robert Sutton (1544–1587 in Stafford) a Roman Catholic priest and martyr, beatified in 1987.
- Edward Wightman (c.1580–1612), a General Baptist, last religious martyr to be burnt at the stake for 'heresy' in England.

== Sports people ==
=== Cricket ===
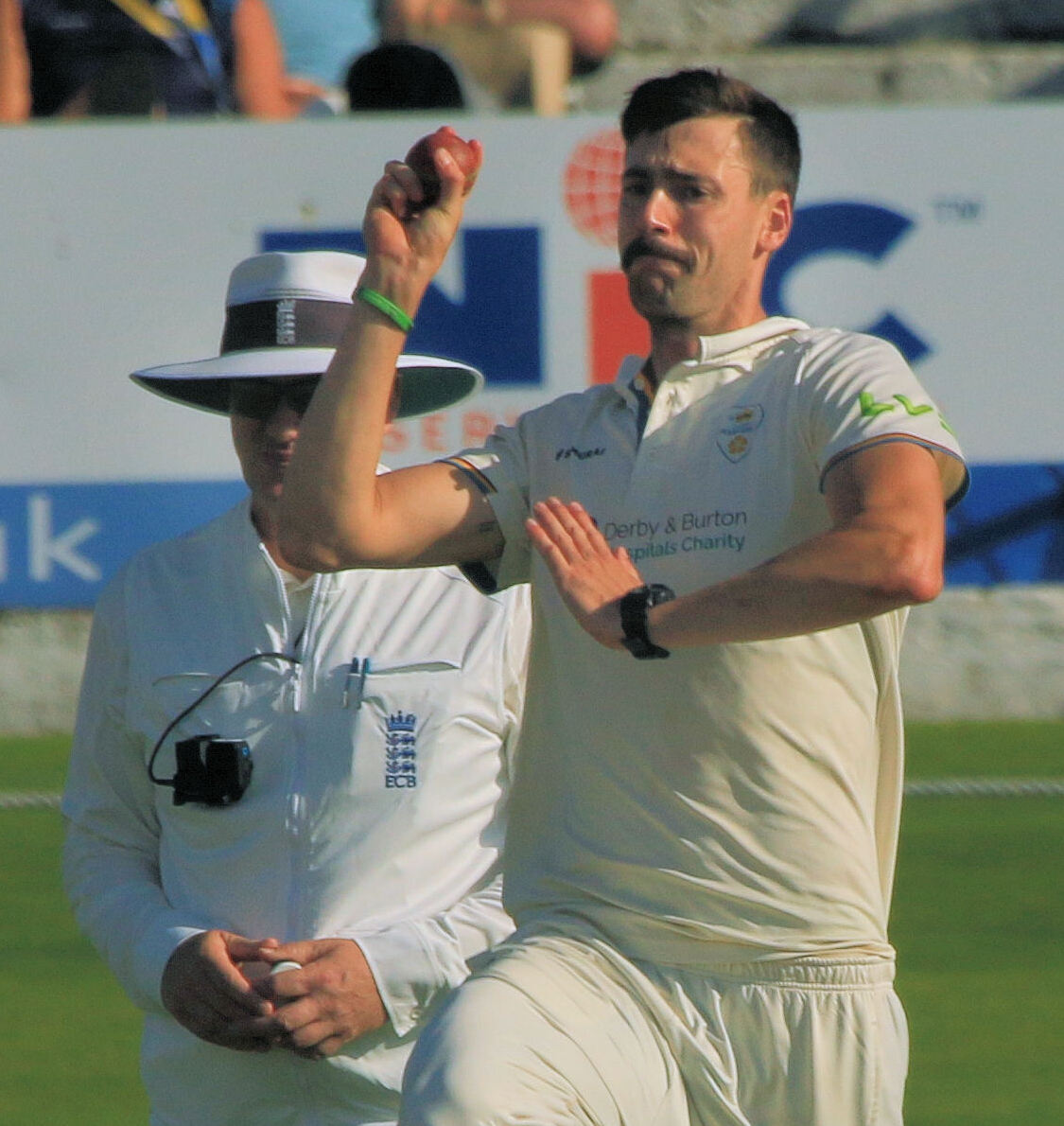
George Scrimshaw

- Abraham Bass (1804-1882), "the father of Midland cricket"
- Jamie Benstead (b. 1979), for Derbyshire and Staffordshire
- Callum Brodrick (b. 1998), for Derbyshire
- Mervyn Brooker (1954-2019), for Staffordshire and Cambridgeshire
- Charles Clarke (1910-1997), for Derbyshire and Sussex
- Charlie Dean (b. 2000) for Hampshire
- John Eadie (1861-1923) for Derbyshire
- James Ede (b. 1984) for Derbyshire
- Scott Elstone (b. 1990), for Nottinghamshire and Derbyshire
- Sydney Evershed (1861-1937) for Derbyshire
- Carl Eyden (born 1980) for Derbyshire
- Arthur Girling (1807–1849) for the North of England cricket team and Manchester
- Andrew Goodwin (b. 1982) for Derbyshire
- Edward Gothard (1904-1989) for Derbyshire
- David Green (1935-2020) for Derbyshire
- Ashleigh Lynch, (born 1990), for Loughborough University
- Peter McKay (b. 1994) for Warwickshire
- Nick Potts (b. 2002) for Derbyshire
- Thomas Poynton (b. 1989) for Derbyshire
- George Scrimshaw (b. 1998) for Worcestershire, Derbyshire, Northamptonshire and England
- Paul Shaw (b. 1967) for Staffordshire
- Henry Sugden (1859-1935) for Derbyshire

=== Football ===
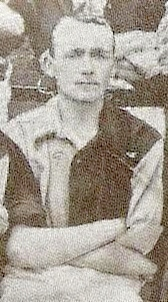
Adruan Capes

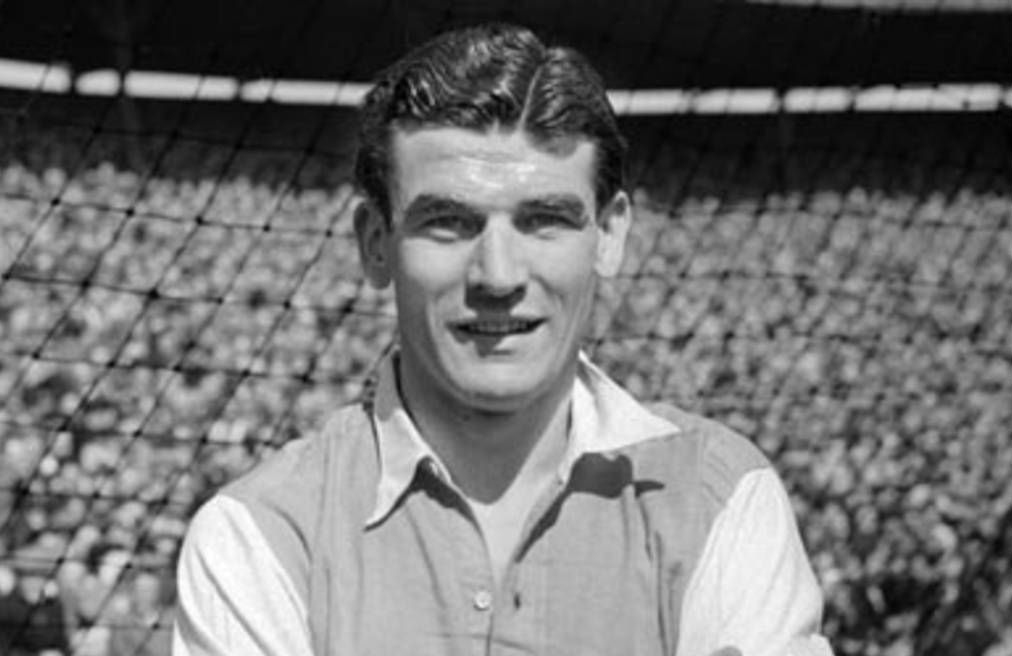
Joe North

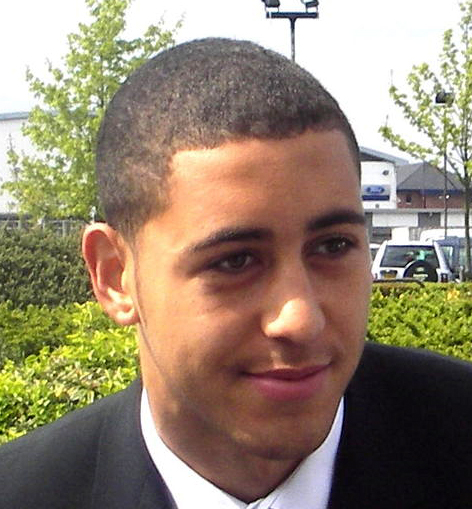
Lewin Nyatanga, 2006

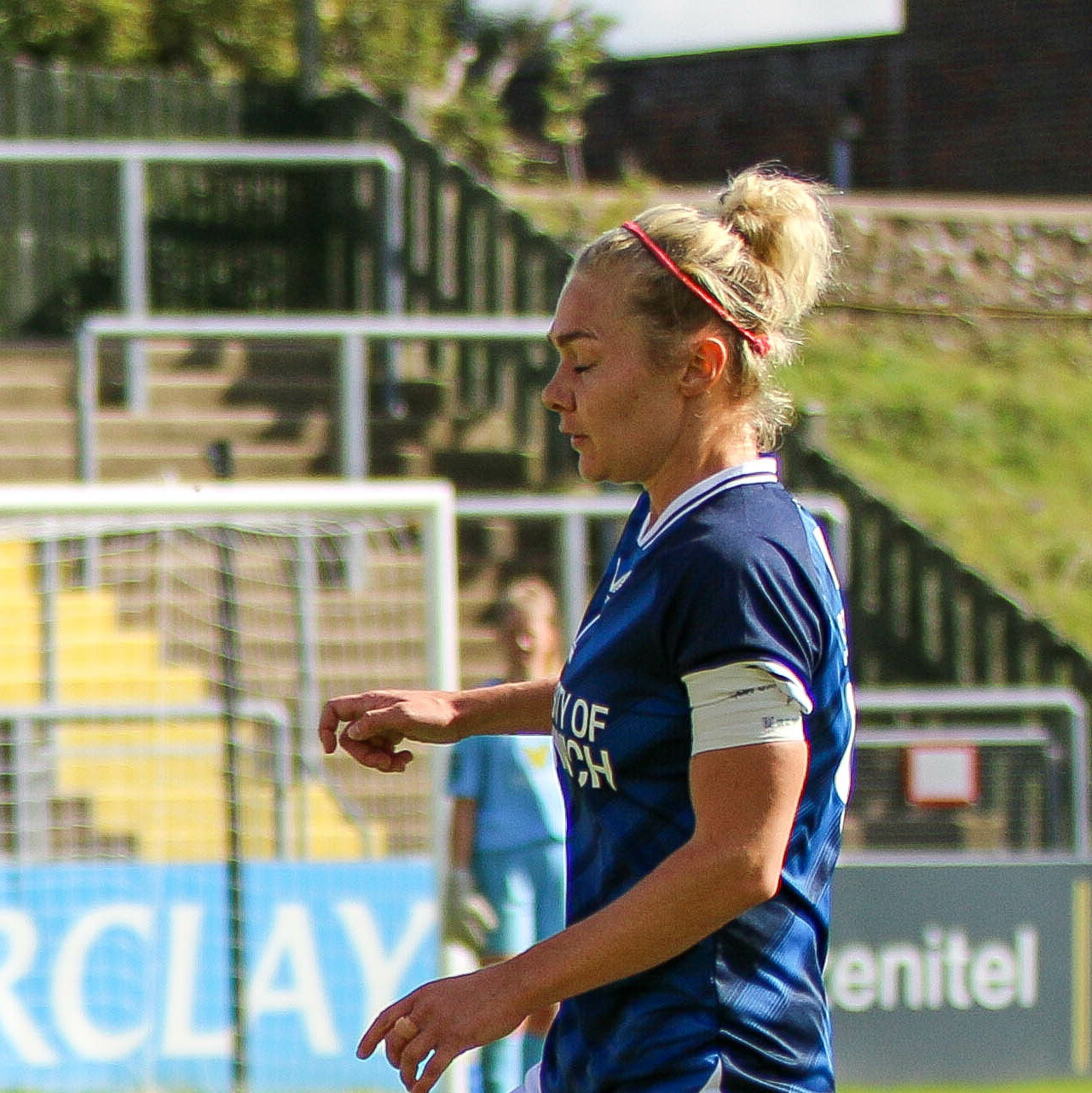
Emily Simpkins

- Ben Appleby (1876-?), for West Bromwich Albion and Bristol Rovers
- Tom Bailey (1888-?), most notably for Stoke.
- Charlie Bannister (1879-1952) for Manchester City, Lincoln City and Swindon Town
- Clem Beddow (1885-?) for Burton United, Manchester United and Burnley
- Dale Belford (b. 1967), played most notably with Hinckley United and Gresley Rovers, now in management
- Amari'i Bell (b. 1994), international caps with Jamaica
- Max Bird (born 2000), defensive midfielder for Derby County F.C. and Bristol City
- Bill Bradbury (1889-1963), for Oldham Athletic and Rochdale
- Harold Bridges (1915-1989) for Tranmere Rovers
- Louis Briscoe (b. 1988), most prolifically for Mansfield Town and Torquay United
- Oliver Brown (1908-1953), for Nottingham Forest, Norwich City and Brighton & Hove Albion
- Adrian Capes (1873–1955) and Arthur Capes (1875–1945) footballing brothers, over 640 pro appearances between them
- Bill Cartwright (1884-?), for Gainsborough Trinity, Chelsea and Tottenham Hotspur
- Sid Cavendish (1876-1954) for Southampton
- Jack Cowley (1877-1926), for Lincoln City and Swindon Town
- Leigh Cowlishaw (b. 1970) for Richmond Kickers
- Gary Croft (b. 1974) most notably at Grimsby Town, Blackburn Rovers and Cardiff City
- Ross Davidson (b. 1989), most notably at Port Vale, Trafford and Leek Town
- Craig Davies (b. 1986), most notably at Oxford United, Barnsley and Bolton Wanderers and for Wales
- Jack Fairbrother (1917-1999) FA Cup winner with Newcastle United
- George Fern (1874-1955), most notably for Lincoln City
- Rodney Fern (1948-2018) for Leicester City, Luton Town, Chesterfield and Rotherham United
- Ben Fox (born 1998), midfielder for Northampton Town F.C.
- Matthew Ghent (b. 1980) England youth team player
- Len Gilchrist (1881-1958) for Burton United and Derby County
- Kaide Gordon (born 2004) winger or attacking midfielder for Liverpool F.C.
- Willie Gould (1886-?) for Bradford City and Manchester City
- Grenville Hair (1931-1968), for Leeds United
- Vic Halom (born 1948) a former footballer, played 452 pro games and stood for Parliament in Sunderland North in 1992
- Jamie Hanson (b. 1995) most notably for Derby County and Oxford United
- Ben Hart (b. 2000) for Burton Albion, Tamworth and Coalville
- Shania Hayles (b. 1999( for Birmingham City, Aston Villa, Bristol City and Newcastle United
- Adam Haywood (1875-1932) most notably for WOolwich Arsenal, Wolverhampton Wanderers and West Bromwich Albion
- Kane Hemmings (born 1991), striker for Tranmere Rovers
- Tony Hemmings (b, 1967) most notably for Wycombe Wanderers and Macclesfield Town
- Bob Hodgkinson (1902-?), for Wrexham
- Ken Horne (1926-2015) for Brentford
- Dean Howell (b. 1980), most notably for Southport and Crawley Town
- John Joyce (1877-1956), most notably for Tottenham Hotspur
- George Kinsey (1866-1936), most notably for Wolverhampton Wanderers
- Thomas Knibbs (d. 1915) for Burton Swifts
- Richard Knight (b. 1979) most notably for Oxford United and Kettering Town
- Ryan Leak (b. 1998) most prolifically for Salford City and Ross County
- Tom Leak (b. 2000) for Walsall and Kidderminster Harriers
- Ike Marsh (1877-1949) most notably for Doncaster Rovers
- Craig McAughtrie (b. 1981) most notably for Carlisle United
- Tom Metcalf (1878-1938) for Burton United, Southampton and Wolverhampton Wanderers
- David Nish, (born 1947) former Leicester City and Derby County footballer who broke the British transfer record in 1972.
- Joe North (1895-1955) for Sheffield United, Arsenal, Reading, Gillingham, Norwich City, Watford and Northfleet United; also cricketer at Middlesex
- Lewin Nyatanga, (born 1988), for Northampton Town F.C. (on loan from Barnsley).
- Tony Parry (1945-2009) for Hartlepool United and Derby County
- Francis Pickering (1891–1966), professional footballer who played as a forward
- Bernard Port (1925-2007) for Chester
- Levi Redfern (1905-1976) for York City, Huddersfield Town and Bradford City
- Charlie Richards (1875-?) most notably for Grimsby Town and Nottingham Forest
- Steve Round (b. 1970 for Derby County and Nuneaton Borough, since in management
- Mark Sale (born 1972) an English former professional footballer who played 321 pro games, now a first team coach under Gary Rowett with Stoke City
- Louie Sibley (b. 2001), for Derby County, Oxford United and the England youth teams
- Emily Simpkins (born 1990) an English footballer who plays as a midfielder for Brighton & Hove Albion W.F.C.
- Fred Slater (1925-2002) most notably for Birmingham City and York City
- Gary Stanley (b. 1954) most notably for Chelsea, Everton and Swansea City
- Owen Story (b. 1984) most notably for Hinckley United
- Darren Stride (born 1975) a former professional footballer, captained Burton Albion for 12 years and played 654 games
- Harry Tufnell (1886-1959), most notably for Barnsley
- George Warren (1880-1917) most notably for Coventry City
- Fred Waterson (1877-1918) for Burton Swifts, Burton United, Fulham and Doncaster Rovers
- Paul Williams (b. 1971 most notably for Derby County and Coventry City, later in management

=== Other ===
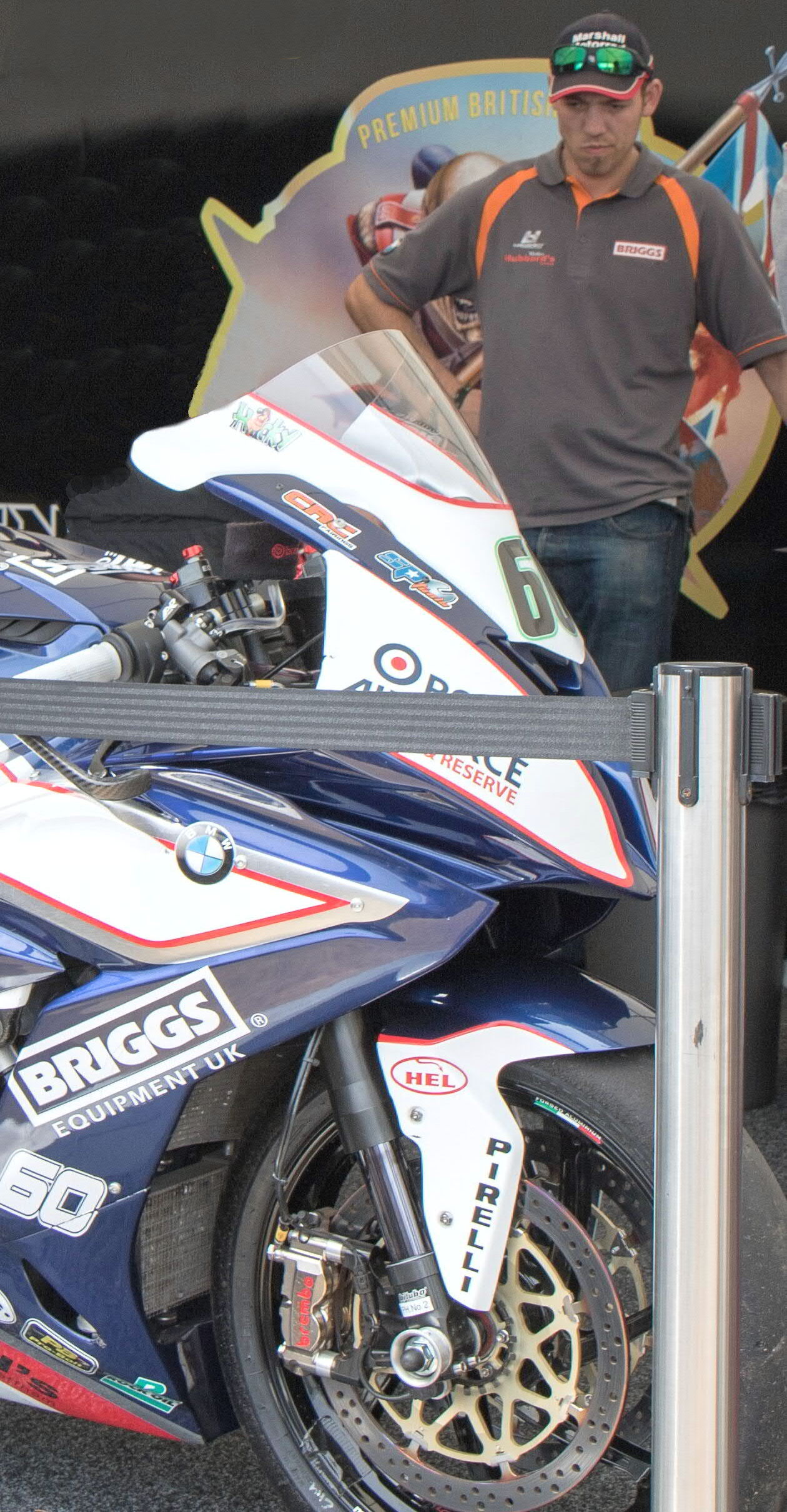
Peter Hickman, 2015

- Richard Bland (b. 1873), golfer
- Neville Brown (born 1966) boxer, British middleweight champion 1993–1998
- Frazer Clarke (born 1991) a British professional boxer who won a bronze medal at the 2020 Summer Olympics.
- Joe Gambles (b.1982), triathlete
- James Gibbons (b.1993), rugby union player
- Henry Gorton (1871-1900), rugby union player
- Tracey Hallam (born 1975) a former English badminton player, competed in the 2004 and 2008 Summer Olympics
- Matt Haywood (b. 1998), rower
- Peter Hickman, (born 1987) English professional motorcycle racer.
- Mark Holtom (born 1958) a retired English 110 m hurdler, who competed in the 1980 and 1984 Summer Olympics
- Andrew Morgan (b. 1934), cross-country skier
- Emily Nelson (b. 1996), racing cyclist
- Josie Nelson (b. 2002), racing cyclist
- George Newberry (1917–1978) a track cyclist, bronze medallist in the 4.000m team pursuit at the 1952 Summer Olympics
- John Robinson (1872-1959), rugby union player and cricketer
- Beth Rodford (born 1982) a British rower, she participated in the 2008 and 2012 Summer Olympics in London

== Miscellaneous ==
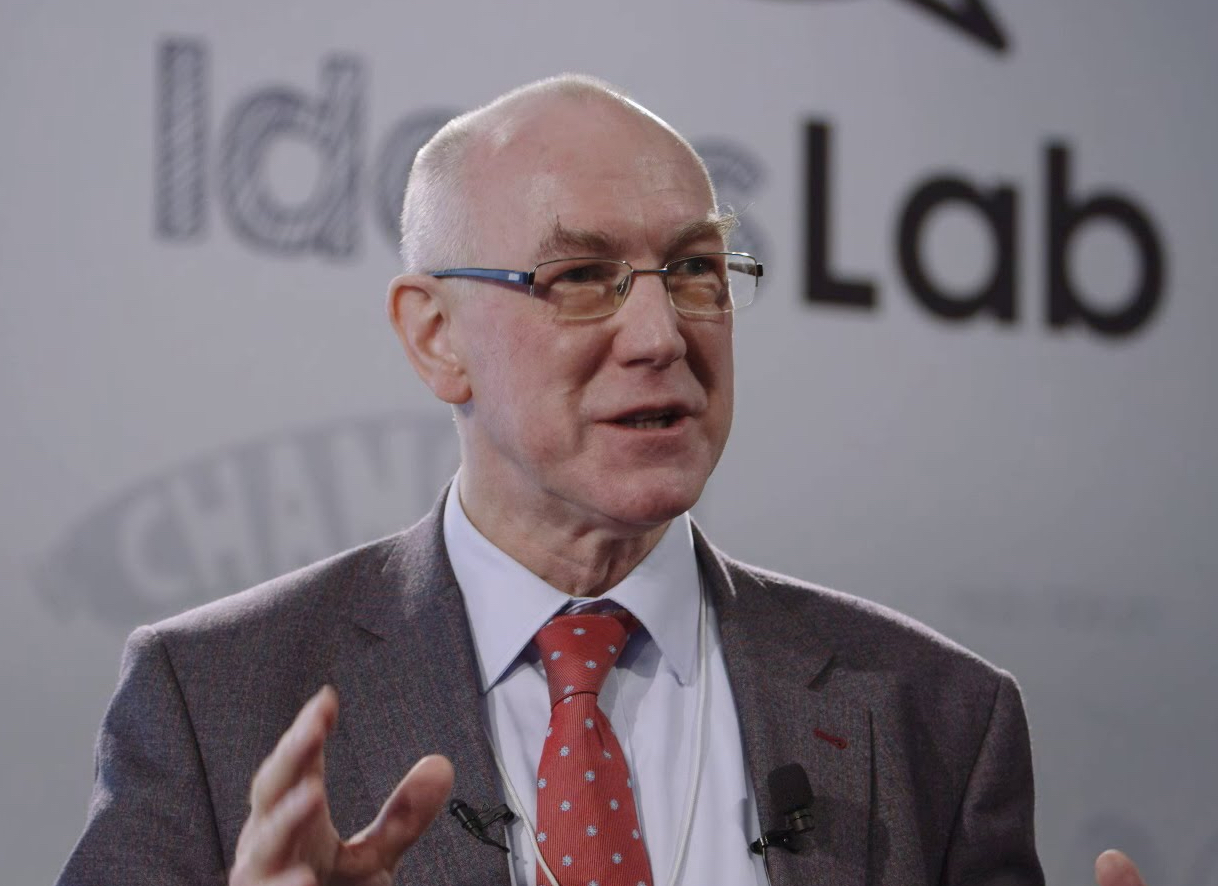
Alan Winfield

- Adrian John Brown (1852-1919) professor of malting and brewing
- Elizabeth Cockayne (1894-1988), nurse
- PC David Copperfield, pen name of police officer Stuart Davidson
- Herbert Willoughby Ellis (1869-1943), entomologist
- Robert W. Ford (1923-2013) British radio officer associated with Tibet.
- Anthony Hardy, (1951–2020) convicted serial murderer
- Frederick Hobday (1859-1969), veterinary surgeon
- Rob McElwee (b. 1961), weather forecaster
- Jose Shercliff (1902-1985), journalist
- Nicholas Whittaker, (born 1957), author, journalist and former pupil of Burton Grammar School
- Alan Winfield (b. 1956), engineer
- Alan Wolffe (1959-2001), biologist
- Alastair Yates (1952–2018) former Sky News and BBC News journalist
