= George Warren =

George Warren may refer to:

(in date order)

- Sir George Warren (MP) (1735–1801), British Member of Parliament
- George Warren (missionary) (fl. 1811), British missionary in Sierra Leone
- George Warren (East India Company officer) (1801–1884), British Army general
- George Warren, 2nd Baron de Tabley (1811–1887), British nobleman and politician
- George Washington Warren (1813–1883), Massachusetts attorney, jurist, and politician
- George Warren (Wisconsin politician) (1828–?), American politician in Wisconsin
- George Warren (prospector) (1835–1893), American copper prospector
- George T. Warren (c. 1842 – after 1916), U.S. politician in Michigan
- George T. Warren II (born 1937), member of the Georgia State Senate
- George Henry Warren (1823–1892), New York City lawyer
- George Henry Warren II (1855–1943), New York City stock broker and real estate developer
- George H. Warren (pilot boat), a 19th-century pilot boat
- George Frederick Warren Jr. (1874–1938), agricultural economist and author, adviser to president Franklin D. Roosevelt
- George M. Warren (1879–1956), American politician and lawyer from Virginia
- George Warren (footballer) (1880–1917), English footballer
- George Warren (South Carolina politician) (1887–1961), South Carolina attorney and politician
- George Warren (priest), Canadian Anglican priest
- George Earle Warren (died 1971), American investment banker
- George M. Warren Jr. (died 2010), American politician and judge from Virginia
