= Senator Warren =

Senator Warren may refer to:

== United States ==
=== Members of the U.S. Senate ===
- Elizabeth Warren (born 1949), senator from Massachusetts (2013-)
- Francis E. Warren (1844–1929), senator from Wyoming (1890–1893, 1895–1929)

=== U.S. state senate members ===
- Charles Henry Warren (1798–1874), Massachusetts State Senate
- Fitz Henry Warren (1816–1878), Iowa State Senate
- George Warren (South Carolina politician) (1887–1961), South Carolina State Senate
- George M. Warren (1879–1956), Virginia State Senate
- George M. Warren Jr. (1922–2010), Virginia State Senate
- George T. Warren II (1937–2025), Georgia State Senate
- George Washington Warren (1813–1883), Massachusetts State Senate
- Joe Warren (Kansas politician) (1912–2003), Kansas State Senate
- Kellie Warren (born 1969), Kansas State Senate
- Lindsay C. Warren (1889–1976), Virginia State Senate
- Lloyd Earl Warren (1896–1934), Virginia State Senate
- Lott Warren (1797–1861), Georgia State Senate
- Moses Warren (1779–1845), New York State Senate
- Rebekah Warren (born 1971), Michigan State Senate
- Robert D. Warren Sr. (1928–2013), North Carolina State Senate
- Robert W. Warren (1925–1998), Wisconsin State Senate
