= Bradley Roberts =

Bradley Roberts may refer to:

- Bradley Roberts (rugby union) (born 1996), Wales international rugby union player
- Bradley Roberts (American politician) (1908–1976), American lawyer and politician in Virginia
- Bradley Roberts (Bahamian politician) (1943–2018)
- Brad Roberts (born 1964), Canadian singer and songwriter
- Brad Roberts (American football) (born c. 2000), American football running back
