= Knibbs =

Knibbs is a surname. Notable people with the surname include:

- Bill Knibbs (1942–2006), Canadian ice hockey player
- Darrel Knibbs (born 1949), Canadian ice hockey player
- George Handley Knibbs (1858–1929), Australian scientist and statistician
- J. W. Knibbs (1880–1953), American football player
- Ralph Knibbs (born 1964), English rugby player
- Thomas Knibbs, English footballer
