= McAughtrie =

McAughtrie is a surname. Notable people with the surname include:

- Craig McAughtrie (born 1981), English footballer
- David McAughtrie (born 1963), Scottish footballer
- Sam McAughtry (1921-2014), Irish/British writer
