= Gallone =

Gallone is an Italian surname. Notable people with the surname include:

- Carmine Gallone (1885–1973), Italian film director
- Gianfranco Gallone (born 1963), Italian bishop and Vatican diplomat
- Luca Gallone (born 1996), British magician
- Maria Alessandra Gallone (born 1966), Italian politician
- Soava Gallone (1880–1957), Polish-born Italian actress, wife of Carmine

== See also ==
- Galloni, surname
- Specchia Gallone, town in Italy
