= Tallone (surname) =

Tallone is a surname. Notable people with the surname include:

- Cesare Tallone (1853–1919), Italian painter
- Filippo Tallone (1902–1962), Italian sculptor
- Guido Tallone (1894–1967), Italian painter, son of Cesare
- Gisele Tallone (1921–2007), French actress

== See also ==
- Gallone
