= Minervino di Lecce =

Minervino di Lecce Griko: Minèrvino tu Lecce
- Comune
- Comune di Minervino di Lecce
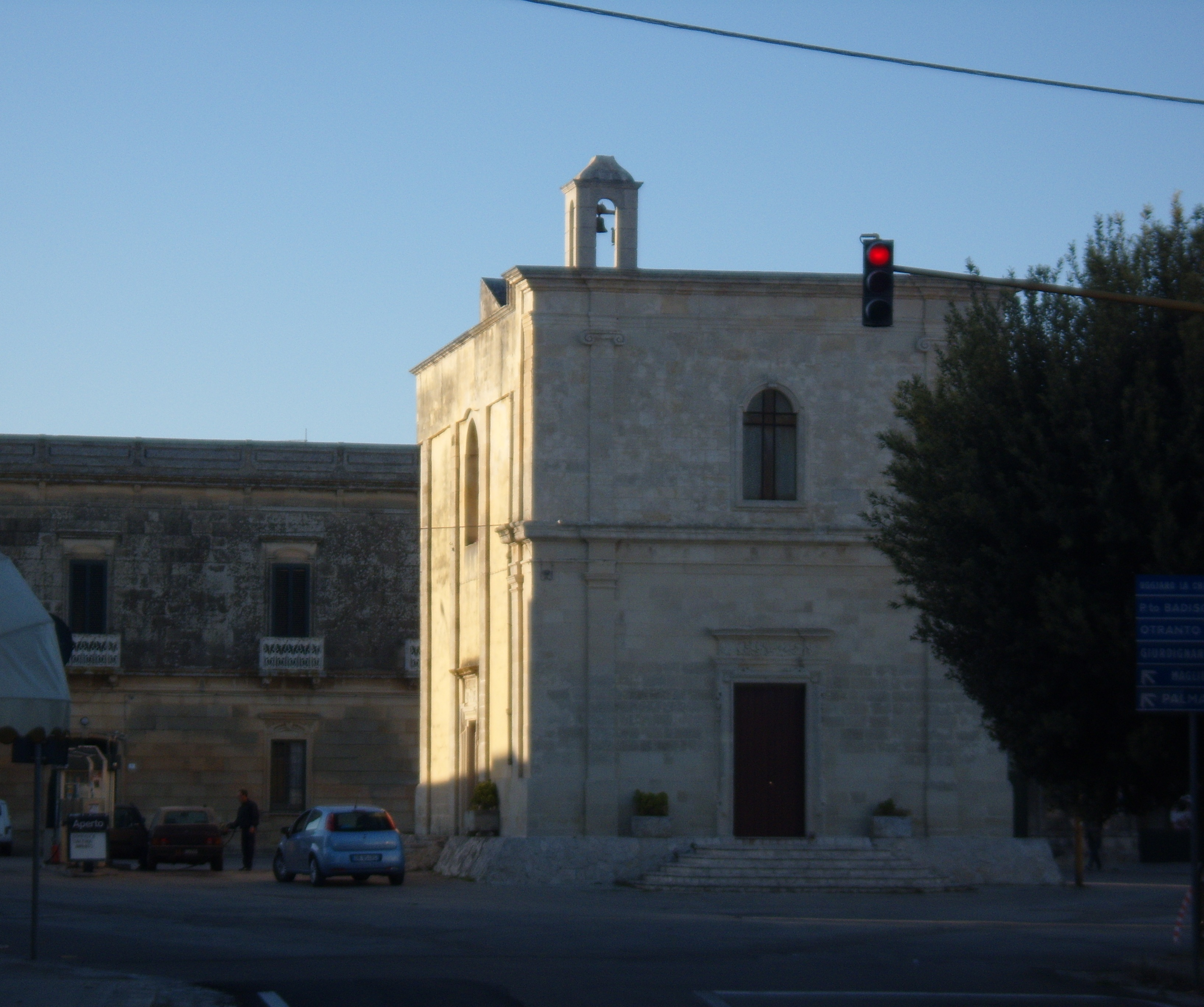

- Coat of arms

- Location within Italy Location within Apulia
- Coordinates: 40°6′N 18°26′E
- Country: Italy
- Region: Apulia
- Province: Lecce (LE)
- Frazioni: Cocumola, Specchia Gallone

Government
  - Mayor: Fausto De Giuseppe

Area
  - Total: 17 km^{2} (6.6 sq mi)
- Elevation: 98 m (322 ft)

Population (31 December 2017)
  - Total: 3,602
  - Density: 210/km^{2} (550/sq mi)
- Demonym: Minervinesi
- Time zone: UTC+1 (CET)
  - Summer (DST): UTC+2 (CEST)
- Postal code: 73027
- Dialing code: 0836
- ISTAT code: 075047
- Patron saint: St. Anthony
- Saint day: 13 June
- Website: Official website

Minervino di Lecce is a town and comune in the province of Lecce, Apulia, south-eastern Italy. It is situated in the eastern part of the Salento peninsula about 43 kilometres (27 mi) from Lecce, not far from Otranto.

== Main sights ==
- Mother church (mid-16th century), one of the most refined Renaissance churches in the Salento. It has carved portals, a richly decorated and wide rose window, large bronze bell and a decorated apse in local stone. One of the portal has a large statue of St. Michael Archangel.
- Church of Madonna delle Grazie
- Convent of St. Anthony (1624)

The Dolmen Li Scusi, in the town's countryside towards Uggiano La Chiesa, is the largest dolmen in Apulia after that of Bisceglie. The frazione of Cocumola is home to numerous Messapic granarys (locally known as fogge) and several menhirs.
