= Henry Stuart Carter =

American politician (1910–1985)

Member of the Virginia House of Delegates from the Washington and Bristol district
- In office January 14, 1948 – January 13, 1960
- Preceded by: George M. Warren
- Succeeded by: Bradley Roberts

Personal details
- Born: September 5, 1910 Big Stone Gap, Virginia, U.S.
- Died: September 17, 1985 (aged 75) Bristol, Tennessee, U.S.
- Resting place: Mountain View Cemetery
- Party: Democratic
- Education: University of Virginia (LLB)
- Occupation: Lawyer; politician

Military service
- Branch/service: United States Army
- Unit: Counterintelligence Corps
- Battles/wars: World War II

Henry Stuart Carter (September 5, 1910 – September 17, 1985) was a Virginia lawyer, who served part-time for a dozen years representing Bristol and Washington County in the Virginia House of Delegates. A member of the Byrd Organization, Carter participated in its Massive Resistance to racial integration.

== Early and family life ==
Henry Stuart Carter was born on September 5, 1910, on a farm in Big Stone Gap, Virginia, to Ida (née Spacht) and Charles Samuel Carter. His mother was originally from Pennsylvania. He was raised in Richmond, Wise County, Virginia with his older brother Charles and younger brother Dale. He attended Fishburne Military School and Bristol High School. He was educated at Emory and Henry College and then at the University of Virginia School of Law, receiving an LL.B. degree in 1935.

== Career ==
Upon graduating law school and being admitted to the bar, Carter practiced in Bristol, Virginia. Carter enlisted in the U.S. Army and served in the Counterintelligence Corps during World War II. After the war, he returned to practicing law.

Carter was a Democrat. He was elected to the Virginia House of Delegates in 1948, representing Washington County and Bristol together with J. Walter Gray, and replacing George M. Warren. He served until 1960. Keys S. Bordwine replaced Gray as the county's other representative in 1950, and was in turn replaced by Fred C. Buck in the 1955 election. During the Massive Resistance crisis in Virginia, Carter served in the Virginia House of Delegates and supported continued racial segregation, as did other members of the Byrd Organization. However, his cousin of similar name, Virginia State Senator Stuart B. Carter of Fincastle, Virginia, led the moderate faction that respected the Supreme Court's Brown decisions, and opposed closing of public schools which integrated because of it.

Bristol's Commonwealth Attorney for a dozen years, Bradley Roberts replaced Carter as Bristol's delegate beginning in January 1960, and served together with Buck until both were replaced after the 1963 elections. He was president of Commonwealth Coal Corporation and member of the board of visitors of Emory and Henry College.

== Personal life ==
Carter was a member of the American Legion and the Veterans of Foreign Wars, as well as both 40 and 8 Elks. He was a member of the State Street United Methodist Church. He lived on Euclid Avenue in Bristol.

Carter died on September 17, 1985, in Bristol Memorial Hospital in Bristol, Tennessee. He was buried in Mountain View Cemetery.
