= Galloni =

Galloni is an Italian surname. Notable people with the surname include:

- Alessandra Galloni (born 1974), Italian journalist
- Antonio Galloni, American wine critic
- Giovanni Galloni (1927–2018), Italian Minister of Education

== See also ==
- Gallone, surname
