= Stuart B. Carter =

American politician (1906–1983)

Member of the Virginia Senate from the 20th district
- In office January 11, 1956 – January 12, 1960
- Preceded by: James C. Carpenter Jr.
- Succeeded by: Hale Collins

Member of the Virginia House of Delegates from Botetourt and Craig Counties
- In office January 11, 1950 – 1955
- Preceded by: Elbert W. Dodd
- Succeeded by: John M. Peck, Jr

Personal details
- Born: April 25, 1906 Philadelphia, Pennsylvania, U.S.
- Died: June 12, 1983 (aged 77) Roanoke, Virginia, U.S.
- Spouse: Mary Shelley Sheridan
- Profession: Attorney

Stuart Barns Carter (April 25. 1906 – June 12, 1983) was a Virginia lawyer, farmer and businessmen who also served as the Democratic legislator representing Botetourt and Craig Counties: first as a delegate in the Virginia General Assembly and later as a State Senator from the 20th District. A lifelong Democrat, Carter helped lead his party's progressive faction, particularly as they opposed the Byrd Organization's policy of Massive Resistance to racial integration in Virginia's public schools.

== Early life and education ==
Carter was born in Philadelphia, Pennsylvania to Charles Dale Carter and his wife Sarah Barns. Widowed when Stuart was an infant, Sarah remarried John S. Pechin and moved to Buchanan, Virginia. He had a half-brother Richard S. Pechin, five years younger than himself. Stuart Carter studied at the Virginia Episcopal School in Lynchburg, Virginia, then at Western Reserve University in Cleveland, Ohio, and at the University of Virginia. He graduated from Cumberland University's law school (now the Cumberland Law School at Samford University) in Tennessee in 1934.

He married Mary Pechin Shelley Sheridan Carter (1901–1966) and they had several children.

== Career ==
After admission to the Virginia bar, Carter began his private legal practice in Fincastle, Virginia, county seat of Botetourt County in 1935. He held various county and state offices before 1950, when he began his formal part-time political career. Carter was a vestryman in his local Episcopal Church, as well as active in the Ruritans, Freemasons, and Virginia Bar Association. He also held a seat on the Democratic Central Committee and served as chairman of the 6th Congressional District Democratic Committee.

In 1959, Carter and his wife moved into Greyledge, a historic home they purchased from Bertha Pechin Jameson, his wife's aunt, in 1954.

In 1966 Carter served as President of the Virginia Association of Counties.

== Political career ==
Carter initially was affiliated with the Byrd Organization, but broke with the policies of U.S. Senator Harry F. Byrd over integration of Virginia's public schools. Carter and state senator Armistead Boothe of Alexandria, Virginia became leaders of what some called the "Young Turks", mostly moderates who had served in World War II and realized the economic and social cost of Massive Resistance. That had begun after the United States Supreme Court decision in Brown v. Board of Education (and companion cases including one from Prince Edward County, Virginia) in 1954 and 1955.

At the time Virginia's schools were in the lowest quartile in the nation both in funding and workforce educations (the typical white attended a year of high school; the typical African American Virginia received only an eighth grade education). Improving the schools and racial integration seemed inevitable to Carter. However, Southside Virginia and other conservative Byrd Democrats vehemently opposed racial integration, and preferred to close schools rather than allow integration anywhere in the state, even pursuant to a court order or where a local school board decision.

Though Virginia's official response to Brown was a commission under State Senator Garland Gray to study options, Gray and U.S. Senator Byrd (and others) became radicalized. When the legislature finally met in August 1956, it debated the a radicalized version of the Gray Commission plan, which became known as the Stanley Plan. That in part proposed to fund segregation academies through tuition grants, which Carter opposed, although it was sponsored by his cousin, H. Stuart Carter. As a lawyer, Carter respected the U.S. Supreme Court's authority to promulgate both decisions in Brown, and did not have ambitions for higher office and so did not feel a need to cater to either the segregationist nor integrationist wings of his party. Byrd Democrats proposed closing public schools to fight integration despite a provision of the state constitution requiring free public education (hence the January 1956 referendum to modify the state constitution which Carter was only one of four delegates to oppose). After both the Virginia Supreme Court and a three-judge federal panel announced on January 19, 1959 that the Stanley Plan was unconstitutional, Governor J. Lindsay Almond eventually reconsidered his opposition to Brown, and joined with the Perrow Commission plan. Meanwhile, Carter had been elected to the Virginia Senate, and although recovering from recent abdominal surgery, appeared to cast his crucial vote in favor of the Perrow Commission plan. Thus, it passed by a single vote.

After Carter's retirement, his senate district was represented by attorney Hale Collins of Covington, Virginia, who would hold it for two decades (although after the 1964 census redistricting, Allegheny, Bedford, Botetourt, Buena Vista, Clifton Forge, Covington, Craig and Rockbridge Counties were collectively placed in the 19th senatorial district).

== Death and legacy ==
Carter survived his beloved wife by more than a decade. He died in Roanoke, Virginia after complications from cancer surgery on June 12, 1983. He and Mary had deeded Greyledge to their children, who eventually sold it in 2001. It was placed on the National Register of Historic Places in 2011.

Virginia House of Delegates
Preceded by Elbert W. Dodd	Representing Botetourt County, Virginia; 1948–55	Succeeded by John M. Peck, Jr
Senate of Virginia
Preceded by James C. Carpenter Jr.	Virginia Senate; 1956–1960	Succeeded by Hale Collins
