= Greyledge =

Historic house in Virginia, United States

- U.S. National Register of Historic Places
- U.S. Historic district
- Virginia Landmarks Register
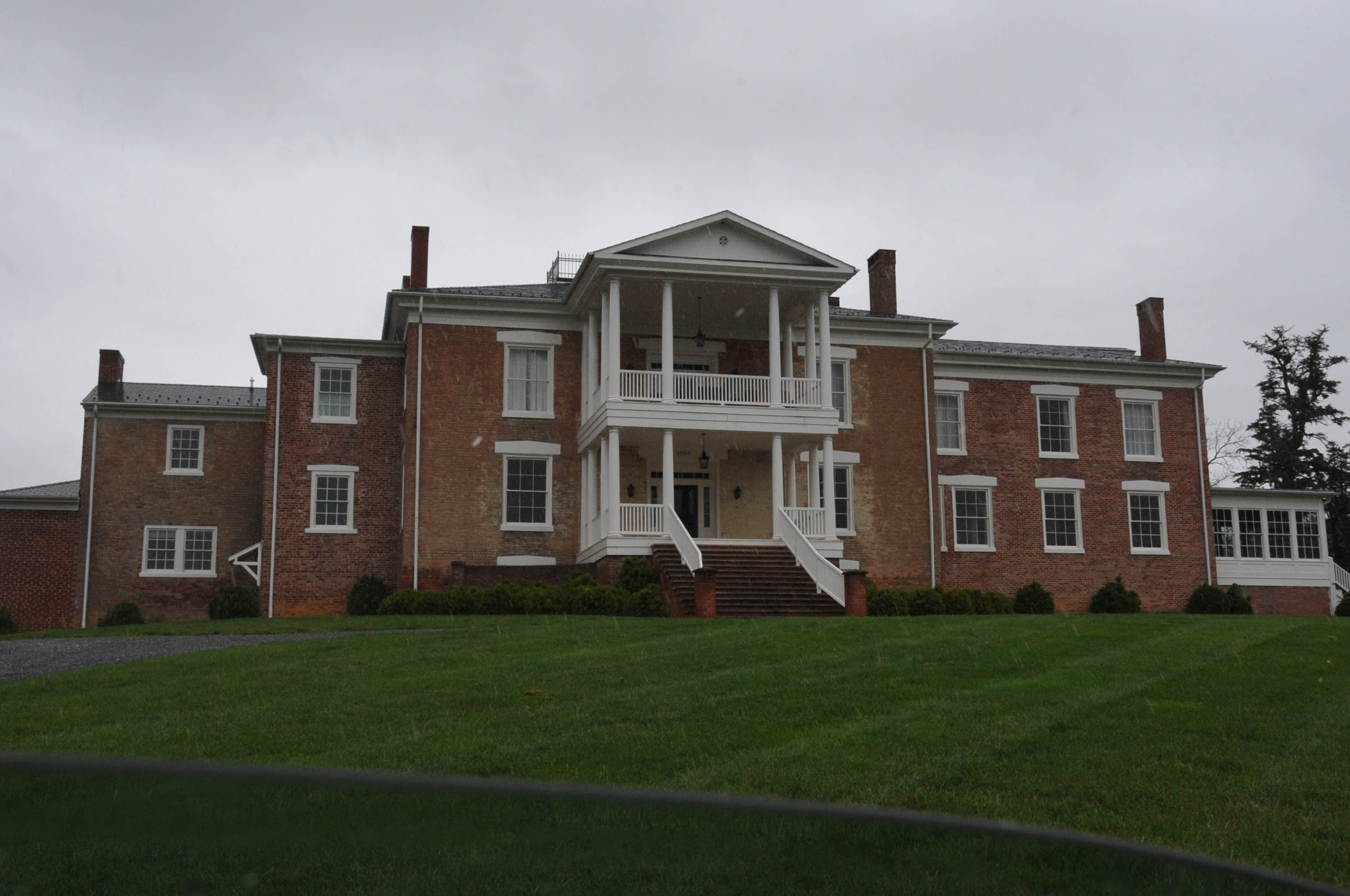

- Location within Virginia Location within the United States
- Location: 1066 Greyledge Rd., near Buchanan, Virginia
- Coordinates: 37°33′19″N 79°40′18″W
- Area: 800 acres (320 ha)
- Built: c. 1842, 1906
- Built by: Cartmill brothers
- Architectural style: Greek Revival
- NRHP reference No.: 01001571
- VLR No.: 011-0010

Significant dates
- Added to NRHP: February 5, 2002
- Designated VLR: September 12, 2001

Greyledge is a historic home and national historic district in Botetourt County, Virginia. It encompasses 13 contributing buildings, 2 contributing sites, and 2 contributing structures, as well as woods and cropland. Although less than a mile from Interstate 81, the house seated on a knob 1200 feet in altitude is not visible from the interstate highway, nor is the highway visible from the house. Purgatory Mountain is visible to the west of the house, which has views of the Blue Ridge Mountains to the south and east. Purgatory Creek drains much of the property and flows into the James River several miles south in the town of Buchanan.

== History ==
The main house was built beginning in 1842 by the Cartmill brothers for their orphaned cousin, Miss Ann Sisson, and finished circa 1855. Ann Sisson inherited the property, then married Charles Gorgas, Pennsylvania-born nephew of a Rockbridge county ironmaster. When Gorgas died of pneumonia in 1862, his wife inherited nearby Etna Furnace and about 7000 acres of iron-bearing land. She married Henry Hansborough in 1866, and died in 1885. In 1895, Edmund Cash Pechin Pennsylvania lawyer and mining expert associated with various railroads and the Virginia Development Company in Roanoke acquired the property from Ann Sisson Gorgas Hansborough's estate and developed it as an estate home. His wife Mary Cash Shelly Pechin headed nearby Buchanan's Village Improvement Society. Both died in the 1920s, and their daughter Bertha Pechin inherited the property. Stuart B. Carter, a Virginia lawyer and state delegate who played a key role in defeating the Byrd Organization's Massive Resistance policy, bought it from Bertha Pechin, his wife's aunt, and did further renovations and restorations. Their children also inherited the property, but the next phase of renovations and restoration began after the 2001 sale.

== Architecture ==
The symmetrical two-story, three-bay, two-room-deep, center-passage-plan main house is in brick and constructed in the Greek Revival style. Slave labor made all the original structure's bricks on the property; the front was built in the Flemish bond style, the sides and rear in stretcher bond style. In 1906, about a decade after the property was purchased by the Pechin family from near Cleveland, Ohio, a two-story east wing and front porch were added in American bond style and painted. The later rear wings (to attach the kitchen and ice house to the main structure) are of weatherboard painted white. Also in the main house complex are a contributing potato cellar/acetylene house, cistern (c. 1900), washhouse/apartment (c. 1900, c. 1940), garage and barn—all constructed around 1900. Around 1930 were added a machinery shed and chicken house. The area also includes a 20th-century pet cemetery and lake (1946). In the late 19th century, another set of buildings were erected around what was sometimes called the Gate House, along with another barn. That area also includes a well/gazebo and garage constructed in the 1930s and a modern shed. A third group of structures includes the Creek House and well constructed in the early 20th century, together with a late 20th century shed, pig pen and privy which are not considered contributing structures. A water tower was removed circa 1960.

It was listed as a Virginia Landmark in September 2001, and on the National Register of Historic Places in 2002.

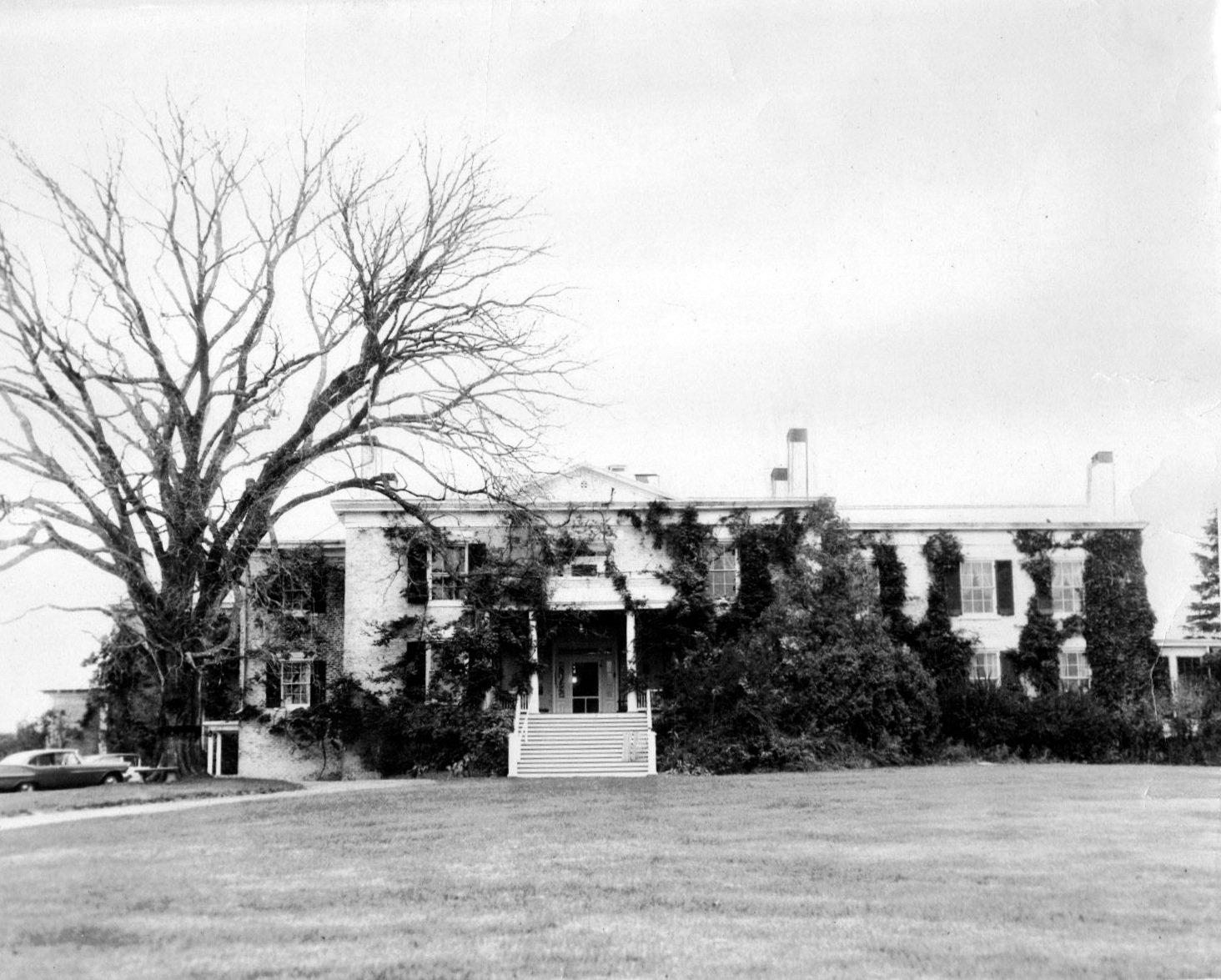
Greyledge c1960

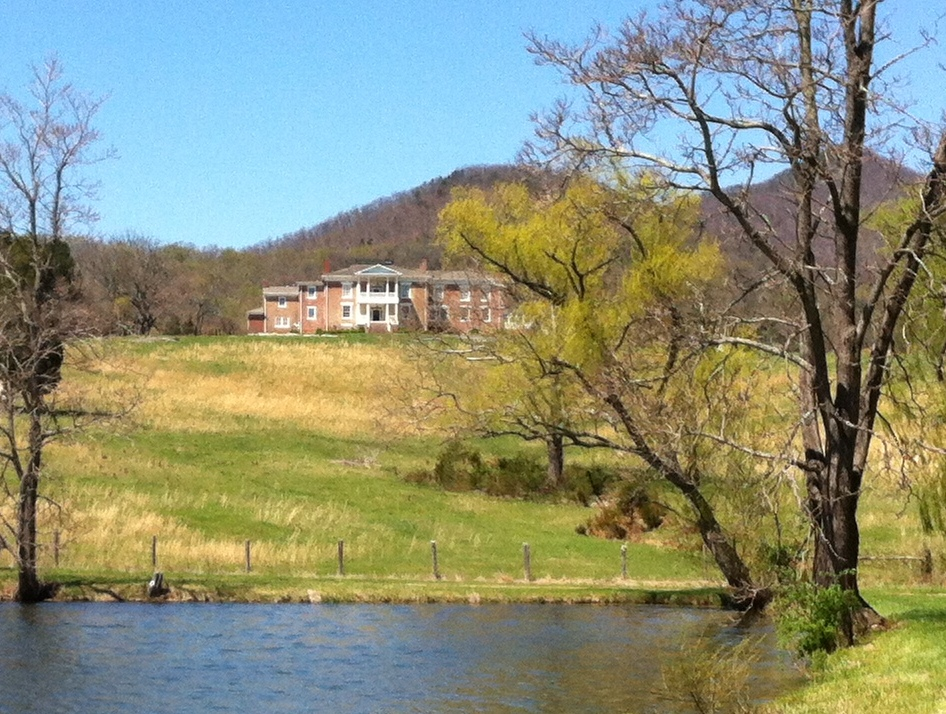
Greyledge c2014
