= Philip Stubbs =

Philip Stubbs (Stubbes) (c. 1555 – c. 1610) was an English pamphleteer.

== Life ==
Stubbs was born about 1555. He was from Cheshire, possibly the area near Congleton. According to Anthony Wood, he was educated at Cambridge and subsequently at Oxford, but did not take a degree and his name is not in university records. He is reputed to have been a brother or near relation of John Stubbs. He married Katherine Emmes (1570/71–1590) in 1586.

His first work was a broadside of 1581, and London literati came to see him as one of a group of ballad writers including also William Elderton and Thomas Deloney. In 1583 he published his best-known work, The Anatomie of Abuses. It consisted of a virulent attack on the manners, customs, amusements and fashions of the period including the theatre, sexual reproduction, gambling, alcohol and fashion. It is still read for its full information on the cultural attitudes of the time.

In 1591 Stubbs published A Christal Glass for Christian Women, for his wife who had died at age 19, of which at least seven editions were called for; it is an example of the ars moriendi in the Protestant tradition. He followed this book with other semi-devotional works. He died in about 1610, aged around 55.

== Written works ==
- 1581, Two Wunderfull and Rare Examples
- 1582, A View of Vanitie, and Allarum to England, or, Retrait from Sinne (now lost)
- 1583, The Anatomie of Abuses
- 1583, The Display of Corruptions (part 2 of The Anatomie of Abuses)
- 1583, The Rosarie of Christian Praiers and Meditations (now lost)
- 1585, The Intended Treason of Doctor Parrie
- 1585, The Theater of the Popes Monarchie
- 1591, A Christal Glasse for Christian Women—biography of his wife, Katherine Stubbes (née Emmes)
- 1592, A Perfect Pathway to Felicitie
- 1593, Motive to Good Workes
