= George Earle Warren =

American investment banker

George Earle Warren (died January 28, 1971) was an American investment banker who served as Vice President of Chase Manhattan Bank. He was also clerk of the Trustees of Columbia University in the City of New York.

== Biography ==
Warren graduated from Columbia College in 1903 and joined the Continental Trust Company, which became the New York Trust Company. In 1909, he moved to the Columbia Trust Company as trust officer, becoming Vice President in 1915. He continued to hold that office when Columbia Trust was merged in 1923 with the Irving Trust Bank. He joined Chase National Bank in 1925 and retired in 1947.

At Chase Manhattan, he was Vice President and concurrently served as director of Virginia-Carolina Chemical Company.

In 1935, he was elected life trustee of Columbia University, and associate clerk of the board of trustees in 1939.

After retiring from banking, he took on an unsalaried position at Columbia, becoming clerk in 1958.

He was also a trustee of the Tuskegee Institute, the New York Infirmary, the Andrew Freedman Home, and the Blue Cross Blue Shield Association of New York.

== Awards ==
Warren received the Order of the Star of Italian Solidarity in 1936 from the Italian government, in recognition of his restoration of the University of Bologna.

In 1937, he received an honorary degree of Master of Arts from Middlebury College.

== Personal life ==
Warren died on January 28, 1971, in Clearwater, Florida, after suffering a sudden illness.
