= Katherine Stubbes =

Katherine Stubbes, or Stubbs, (1570/71-14 December 1590) was an Englishwoman, best known for being the subject of a biography and memorial tract called A Chrystall Glasse for Christian Women, written and published by her husband Philip Stubbs after her death. Besides details about her parents, marriage, and conduct as a daughter and wife, the work also records the confessions of faith (supposedly verbatim) that she spoke before her death. It also includes her dying farewells to family and friends. The text ends with her dying greetings to Christ.

== Personal life ==
Katherine Stubbes was born Katherine Emmes in either 1570 or 1571, the second-youngest child, and only daughter, of seven. Her father, William Emmes, was a cordwainer and a zealous Puritan; her mother was Dutch and a Puritan as well, so Katherine was raised in a very religious household. Katherine was married to Philip Stubbs, an English pamphleteer and publisher, in 1586 at the age of fifteen. Katherine’s father had already died by that time. Mr. Stubbs had "recently gained some notoriety by rebuking the world, and England in particular, for its backsliding with his tract The Anatomy of Abuses," but, because of her father’s death, she most likely had to be married off quickly for financial reasons.

In A Chrystall Glasse, Katherine's husband praises her as being very pious, courteous and obedient. She was not prone to indulge in eating or drinking, saying "we should eate to live, & not live to eate." When asked why she had so little care for earthly things, she would say that to be "a friend unto this world…should be an enemie unto God." Katherine also never lied or quarreled, and even kept herself far from any unscrupulous behavior and talk, let alone speak as such herself. Her husband claims that no one ever spoke any bad words about her, for they would have no cause to, "so continently she lived." As a deeply religious and extremely pious woman, much of Katherine's short life revolved around religion and Scripture. Her husband mentions that one almost never saw her without a Bible (or another "good book") in her hands. If she was not actively reading the Bible, she was discussing and reasoning the word of God with her husband.

Katherine lived with her husband for almost four and a half years, at which time she became pregnant with a son. She would often say that this child would be her last, and that she would only "live but to bring that Childe into the world." Despite this, she had a very successful delivery—in fact, she reportedly was able to sit up and walk on her own only four or five days after the fact. Katherine’s saying "I have but a short time to live here [on Earth]", though it may have been added posthumously by her husband, turned out to be rather accurate. After she had seemed to have a full recovery, she fell seriously ill with ague and languished in her bed, not sleeping for more than an hour at a time, though she had "perfect understanding, sense, and memory to the last breath." She did not pray for her recovery, but to die so she could be with the Lord in Heaven; she constantly prayed for Jesus to take her out of her mortal body. During her final sickness, Katherine "requested that her neighbors be brought into her home so that she might confess publicly." Katherine died on 14 December 1590, a few weeks after her son was born, in Burton upon Trent in Staffordshire. She was only 19 years old.

== A Chrystall Glasse for Christian Women ==
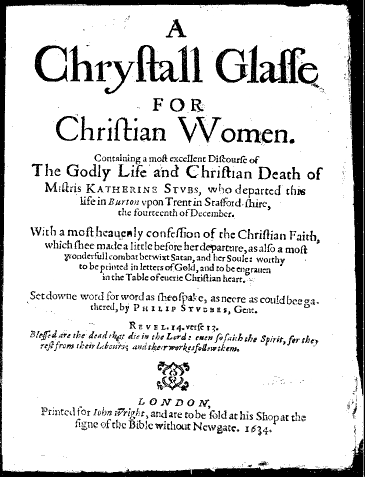
The title page of A Chrystall Glasse

Katherine’s husband first published A Chrystall Glasse in 1592, two years after her death. The biography praises Katherine quite highly: according to Mr. Stubbs, she was a very good, pious woman, and should be held up as a mirror of womanhood, hence the title of the work. The full text on the title page is as follows:

A Chrystall Glasse for Christian Women.

Containing a most excellent Discourse of the Godly Life and Christian Death of Mistris Katherine Stubs, who departed this life in Burton upon Trent in Stafford-shire, the fourteenth of December.

With a most heavenly confession of the Christian Faith, which shee made a little before her departure, as also a most wonderfull combat betwixt Satan, and her Soule: worthy to be printed in letters of Gold, and to be engraven in the Table of everie Christian heart.

Set downe word for word as she spake, as neere as could bee gathered, by Philip Stubbes, Gent.

Revel.14.verse 13. Blessed are the dead that die in the Lord: even so saith the Spirit, for they rest from their labours, and their workes follow them.

After a brief few pages about Katherine’s life, the text goes into detail about her death: that and her confessions of faith soon before her death make up the bulk of A Chrystall Glasse. The section of Katherine’s confession of faith, entitled “A moste heavenly confession of the Christian faith, made by the blessed servant of God Mistris Katherine Stubbes, a little before she dyed” represents Katherine’s own religious creed, which mirrors the doctrine of the Elizabethan church. After that, in “A most wonderfull conflict betwixt Sathan and her soule, and of her valiant conquest in the same, by the power of Christ,” she argues with Satan, who seemed to have appeared before her, and she eventually vanquishes him. In her dying moments, she sings a psalm and asks her husband not to mourn her—then, “her breath stayed, and so moving neither hand nor foot she slept sweetly in the Lord.”

=== Criticism ===
Although A Chrystall Glasse is a biography, numerous scholars and critics agree that it is not one that is completely unbiased and without motives. Insight into the text can be obtained by reading from economic, religious, and feminist perspectives. Philip Stubbs, as the author of the work, sets himself up as the narrator, giving the feel of objectivity. However, even though it claims to have copied her work verbatim, we cannot know that for sure, since the text is not written down by the woman herself: she is merely represented by her husband. The work is seen as an exaggerated portrayal of Katherine, which indicates that her husband had further motivation for publishing the work than simply as a dedication to her memory—Katherine was meant to be a model of the ideal early modern Protestant woman. From an economic perspective, in the age of emergent capitalism, Katherine was also held up by her husband as a contrast and critique of the “bourgeois women consumers who offered her a world of goods—fine food, prideful apparel, and plays.”

Primarily, godly and pious women were meant to emulate Katherine’s strong religious faith and piety, which included the practice of “obsessive Bible reading.” As a public speaker, she also places herself as an active member of the religious community. Religion, of course, also has strong ties to death, and Katherine’s confessions and discussion of death were not uncommon themes in the discourse of early modern women. Stubbes’ speeches have been compared with Rachel Speght’s Mortalities Memorandum, with A Dream Prefixed (1621) and Alice Sutcliffe’s Meditations of Man’s Mortalitie (1634), since all three give rise to discussion about the question of the woman’s voice.

When reading A Chrystall Glasse from a feminist perspective, one way the text can be seen is as evidence of Katherine’s “internalisation of the ideology of womanhood.” As the ‘mirror of womanhood’ from an early modern European perspective, the text suggests that Katherine seemed to live vicariously through her husband: everything he felt, she felt as well. Despite the fact that Katherine seems the perfect model of Christian womanhood, one can also see gaps between the various descriptions of her in A Chrystall Glasse. For example, she is described as an “active and intelligent disputer against Catholics and atheists: ‘she would not yield a jot, nor give place to them at all, but would most mightily justify the truth of God against their blasphemous untruths, and convince them.’” Despite this, Mr. Stubbs goes on to say that Katherine was the very model of the ‘silent woman,’ and would engage in “theological questioning only in private at home…‘she obeyed the commandment of the apostle who biddeth women be silent, and to learn of their husbands at home.’” She also showed assertion in other ways: on her deathbed, she specifically expresses to her husband her wishes for her child’s education. The apparent disparity between the descriptions and rhetoric of Katherine Stubbs causes A Chrystall Glasse to become a text where “women can find not just a model of the ideal woman, but also ways of, and places for, articulating specific roles and powers which are not explicitly part of the dominant ideology.” Even so, others argue that the text can be seen not simply a struggle against “restrictive masculine discourses…but as an affirmation of more numerous…discursive options for early modern women.” In any case, considering that A Chrystall Glasse had 34 editions from 1591 to 1700, it must have resonated strongly with society throughout the early modern period.

== Secondary sources ==
Aughterson, Kate. Renaissance Woman: a sourcebook: constructions of femininity in England. New York: Routledge, 1995.

Banerjee, Pompa. Burning Women: widows, witches, and early modern European travelers in India. Early Modern Cultural Studies, 1500-1700. New York: Palgrave Macmillan, 2003.

Brayman Hackel, Heidi & Kelly, Catherine E. Reading Women: literacy, authorship, and culture in the Atlantic world, 1500-1800. Philadelphia: University of Pennsylvania Press, 2008.

Lamb, Mary Ellen, "Inventing the Early Modern Woman Reader through the World of Goods: Lyly's Gentlewoman Reader and Katherine Stubbes," in Heidi Brayman Hackel and Catherine E. Kelly, editors. Reading Women: Literacy, Authorship, and Culture in the Atlantic World, 1500–1800 (Philadelphia: University of Pennsylvania Press, 2008) (Material Texts).

Lamb, Mary Ellen, Travitsky, Betty S., & Cullen, Patrick. Brief Confessional Writings: Grey, Stubbes, Livingstone and Clarksone. Printed Writings, 1500-1640: Part 2, v. 2. Aldershot: Ashgate Publishing Ltd., 2001.

Lemon, Rebecca, Mason, Emma, Roberts, Jonathan, & Rowland, Christopher. The Blackwell Companion to the Bible in English literature. Chichester: Blackwell Publishing Ltd., 2009.

Malcolmson, Cristina, and Suzuki, Mihoko. Debating Gender in Early Modern England, 1500-1700. Early Modern Cultural Studies, 1500-1700. New York: Palgrave Macmillan, 2002.

Mascuch, Michael. Origins of the Individualist Self: autobiography and self-identity in England, 1591-1791. Palo Alto: Stanford University Press, 1997.

Stubbes, Philip. “A chrystall glasse for Christian women". ProQuest. https://www.amazon.com/chrystall-Christian-Containing-excellent-fourteenth/dp/1240943350

Travitsky, Betty. The Paradise of Women: Writings by Englishwomen of the Renaissance. New York: Columbia University Press, 1989.
