= Francis Pickering (footballer) =

English footballer

Personal information
- Full name: Francis Guy Pickering
- Date of birth: 1891
- Place of birth: Burton-upon-Trent, England
- Date of death: 22 December 1966 (aged 74–75)
- Height: 6 ft 1 in (1.85 m)
- Position: Forward

Senior career*
Years	Team	Apps	(Gls)
1912–1913	Sutton Town		
1913	Grimsby Town	2	(0)
1913–191?	Sutton Town		
- * Club domestic league appearances and goals

Francis Guy Pickering (1891 – 22 December 1966) was an English professional footballer who played as a forward.
