= Specchia Gallone =

Town in Lecce, Apulia, Italy

Coordinates: 40°07′N 18°25′E

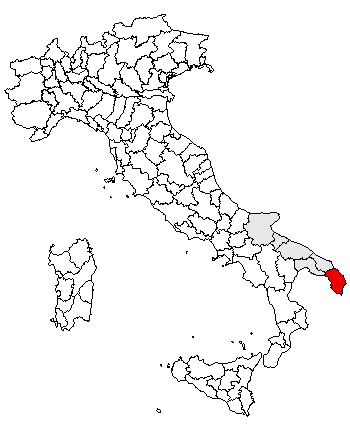
Location of the province of Lecce in Italy

Specchia Gallone is a small Italian town close to the Adriatic coast and about 40 km distant from Lecce. Administratively it counts as a frazione of the commune of Minervino di Lecce, and falls within the province of Lecce in the Apulia region of south-east Italy.
