= George Warren (priest) =

Canadian Anglican priest

George Warren was a Canadian Anglican priest in the late 19th and early 20th Centuries.

Davidson was educated at Trinity College, Toronto and ordained in 1888. After a curacy in Bowmanville he was the incumbent at Lakefield, ON from 1889 to 1905. He was Archdeacon of Peterborough from 1905 to 1920.
