= Calvert Worthington =

English brewer

Calvert Worthington (29 August 1830 – 17 November 1871) was an English brewer.

Born at Burton-upon-Trent in 1830 and educated at Repton School, he was the son of William Worthington (1799–1871), of the Worthington brewing family, and his wife Mary Anne Calvert. He died at Burton upon Trent in 1871, the same year as his father, at the age of 41.
