= Bradley Roberts (American politician) =

American lawyer and politician (1908–1976)

Commonwealth's Attorney for Bristol
- In office February 1974 – August 8, 1976
- Preceded by: Dick Rouse
- Succeeded by: George M. Warren Jr.
- In office January 1, 1942 – December 31, 1957
- Preceded by: Love B. Rouse
- Succeeded by: Dick Rouse

Member of the Virginia House of Delegates from the Washington and Bristol district
- In office January 13, 1960 – January 8, 1964
- Preceded by: Henry Stuart Carter
- Succeeded by: J. Russell Moore

Personal details
- Born: August 10, 1908 Bristol, Virginia, U.S.
- Died: August 8, 1976 (aged 67) Moscow, Soviet Union
- Party: Democratic
- Spouse: Irene Woods
- Parent: Floyd H. Roberts (father)
- Education: King College (AB); University of Virginia (LLB)
- Occupation: Lawyer; politician

Military service
- Branch/service: United States Navy; Naval Reserve
- Rank: Lieutenant commander
- Battles/wars: World War II; American theater; Pacific theater

Bradley Roberts (August 10, 1908 – August 8, 1976) was an American lawyer and Democratic Party politician, who served as the commonwealth's attorney of the independent city of Bristol, Virginia and as a member of the Virginia House of Delegates. He was the son of prominent lawyer Floyd H. Roberts, a recess appointment of Franklin D. Roosevelt for a seat on the United States District Court for the Western District of Virginia.

He died on a trip to Moscow on August 8, 1976.
