= Tom Metcalf (footballer) =

English footballer

Personal information
- Full name: Thomas Clark Metcalf
- Date of birth: October qtr. 1878
- Place of birth: Burton upon Trent, England
- Date of death: May 1938 (aged 59)
- Place of death: Burton upon Trent, England
- Position: Left-half

Senior career*
Years	Team	Apps	(Gls)
1903–1904	Burton United	0	(0)
1904–1906	Southampton	1	(0)
1906–1908	Salisbury City		
1908–1909	Wolverhampton Wanderers	9	(0)
- * Club domestic league appearances and goals

Thomas Clark Metcalf (1878 – May 1938) was an English professional footballer who played as a half-back for Southampton and Wolverhampton Wanderers in the 1900s.

== Football career ==
Metcalf was born in Burton upon Trent and started his football career with Burton United, then playing in the Football League Second Division, in January 1903. He failed to break into the first team, and in March 1904 he moved to the south coast to join Southern League champions, Southampton.

Most of his time with the "Saints" was spent in the reserves who he helped win the Hampshire Senior Cup in 1905. His first-team debut came on 23 September 1905 when he took the place of Samuel Meston at left-half, with Meston moving to the right in the absence of Bert Lee, for the Southern League match at Northampton Town, won 2–1. With Meston and England international Bert Houlker vying for the left-half berth, there were no further first-team opportunities for Metcalf and in the 1906 close season he joined Salisbury City, who had just joined the Second Division of the Southern League.

In February 1908, Metcalf returned to the Football League to join Wolverhampton Wanderers for whom he played nine league matches before retiring in 1909.

== Later career ==
Following his retirement from football, Metcalf returned to Burton upon Trent where he was employed by the Allsopp brewery.
