= Luca Gallone =

British magician and Internet personality

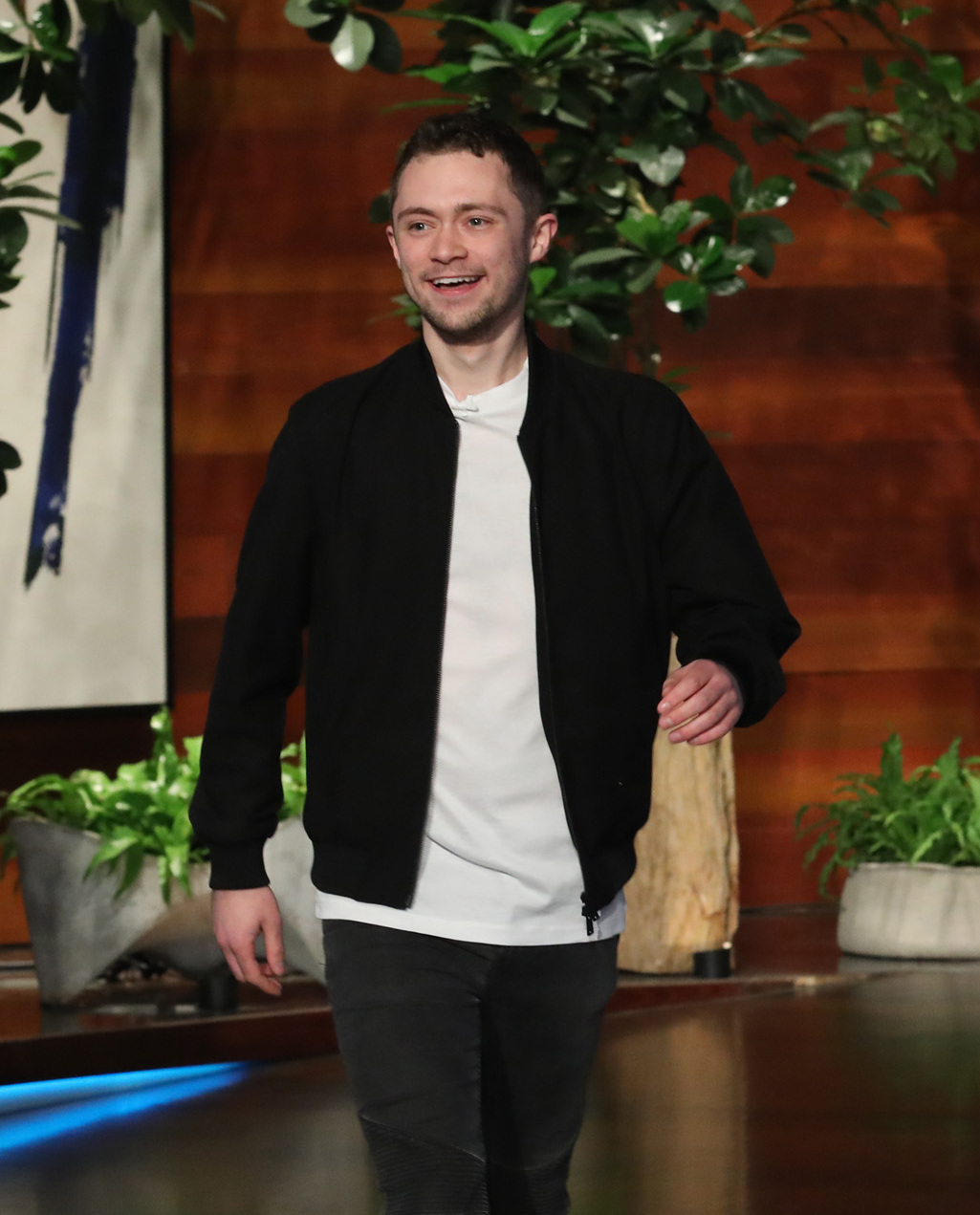
- Gallone on The Ellen DeGeneres Show in 2019
- Born: 14 March 1996 (age 29); Burton-on-Trent, Staffordshire, England, United Kingdom
- Occupation: Magician
- Years active: 2014–present
- Website: lucagallone.com

Luca Gallone (born 14 March 1996) is an English magician.

== Early life and education ==
Luca Gallone was born in Burton-on-Trent, Staffordshire on 14 March 1996. Gallone attended Abbot Beyne School and Sixth form in East Staffordshire, where he also spent two years performing at weddings and private events alongside his studies. He dropped out from University of Derby to pursue his career as a professional Magician.

== Career ==
At 18, Gallone launched his business as a magician with help from The Princes Trust. A year later, in 2016, he was invited to appear on Britain's Got Talent where he won over all four judges. Following his success on Britain’s Got Talent, in 2018 Gallone began to create online viral videos and has since built an audience of over 10 million followers across social media. He performed in several countries including performance for Prince Charles’ 70th Birthday event at The London Palladium.

In 2019, Gallone was signed to United Talent Agency. Later that year, after one of his viral videos appeared on American TV show Right This Minute. he appeared on The Ellen DeGeneres Show where he performed some magic tricks for the TV host and a member of the audience.

The Daily Mirror published an article featuring Gallone performing a viral magic trick that involved a marriage proposal.

Gallone has Italian roots and featured in the Italian TV shows including an article in GQ Italian edition.

After several years of building his online presence, in March 2020 the BBC listed Gallone as the third biggest TikTok Star in the UK, whilst the Evening Standard referred to him as "the biggest magician on the app".
