= George M. Warren Jr. =

American politician and judge (1922–2010)

Commonwealth's Attorney for Bristol
- In office August 23, 1976 – December 31, 2001
- Preceded by: Bradley Roberts
- Succeeded by: Larry Kirksey

Member of the Virginia Senate
- In office January 8, 1964 – September 11, 1975
- Preceded by: Thomas C. Phillips
- Succeeded by: Rick Boucher
- Constituency: 15th district (1964‍–‍1966); 14th district (1966‍–‍1972); 39th district (1972‍–‍1973)

Personal details
- Born: George Marvin Warren Jr. August 19, 1922 Bristol, Virginia, U.S.
- Died: January 12, 2010 (aged 87) Bristol, Virginia, U.S.
- Resting place: Emory, Virginia, U.S.
- Party: Democratic
- Spouse: Musser Watkins
- Children: 3
- Parent: George M. Warren (father)
- Education: Emory and Henry College; University of Virginia
- Occupation: Politician; lawyer; judge

Military service
- Branch/service: United States Navy
- Rank: Lieutenant
- Battles/wars: World War II; Pacific theater

George Marvin Warren Jr. (August 19, 1922 – January 12, 2010) was an American politician and judge from Virginia. He served as a member of the Virginia Senate from 1964 to 1973.

== Early life and education ==
George M. Warren Jr. was born to George M. Warren in Bristol, Virginia. He graduated from Emory and Henry College. He was a member of Sigma Iota. He was a naval officer and served during World War II in the Pacific for three years. He attained the rank of lieutenant. He later graduated from the University of Virginia School of Law in 1948.

== Career ==
Warren was a lawyer and practiced law with his father. In 1949, he served briefly as commonwealth's attorney for the city of Bristol, Virginia. In April 1950, he was appointed as U.S. Commissioner of the Western District of Virginia by judge John Paul.

Warren was elected to the Virginia Senate in 1963. He served from 1964 to 1975, representing the counties of Lee, Scott, Washington, Smyth, a portion of Russell, and Bristol. He was a member of the committees on courts of justice, finance, privileges and elections, and roads and internal navigation. He was a staff member for three governors and was a member of the State Crime Commission for 12 years. He was also a member of the Election Laws Study Commission. He supported legislation for the School of Veterinary Medicine at Virginia Tech and was chairman of the study commission that created the school. He introduced legislation for the design of the Natural Tunnel and the Bristol–Washington County Industrial Park.

Warren served as commonwealth's attorney of Bristol from 1976 to January 2002. He then continued his private law practice. He also served for eight years on the Virginia State Council for Higher Education. He was appointed on August 1, 2002, as pro tempore judge of the 28th judicial district. He left the bench in January 2003.

== Personal life ==
Warren married Musser Watkins. They had two sons and a daughter, George M. III, James Watkins and Merle. He lived in Bristol.

Warren died on January 12, 2010, aged 87, at Wellmont Hospice House in Bristol. He was buried in Emory.

== Awards ==
In 1998, Warren was presented the Tradition of Excellence Award by the Virginia State Bar for his 55-year law career.
