= George M. Warren =

American politician and lawyer (1879–1956)

Member of the Virginia Senate from the 15th district
- In office January 14, 1948 – November 15, 1956
- Preceded by: William N. Neff
- Succeeded by: Thomas C. Phillips

Member of the Virginia House of Delegates from the Washington and Bristol district
- In office January 10, 1940 – January 14, 1948
- Preceded by: Donald Stant
- Succeeded by: Henry Stuart Carter
- In office March 16, 1927 – January 13, 1932
- Preceded by: S. Bruce Jones
- Succeeded by: William N. Neff

Mayor of Bristol, Virginia
- In office September 1, 1923 – March 1, 1927
- Preceded by: W. H. Rouse
- Succeeded by: P. A. Goodwyn
- In office September 1, 1912 – September 1, 1919
- Preceded by: William Rice
- Succeeded by: W. H. Rouse

Personal details
- Born: George Marvin Warren; May 6, 1879 Emory, Virginia, U.S.
- Died: November 15, 1956 (aged 77) Bristol, Virginia, U.S.
- Resting place: Emory Cemetery
- Party: Democratic
- Spouse: Ruba Litton
- Children: 3, including George Jr.
- Education: Emory & Henry College (BA); University of Virginia
- Occupation: Politician; lawyer

George Marvin Warren (May 6, 1879 – November 15, 1956) was an American politician and lawyer from Virginia. He served in the Virginia House of Delegates from 1927 to 1930 and from 1940 to 1947. He also served in the Virginia Senate from 1947 to his death.

== Early life ==
George Marvin Warren was born on May 6, 1879, in Emory, Virginia. He graduated from Emory and Henry College with a Bachelor of Arts and graduated with a degree from the University of Virginia School of Law.

== Career ==
In 1910, Warren began practicing law in Bristol. He practiced law for 46 years. From 1912 to 1919 and from 1923 to 1927, he served as mayor of Bristol. While mayor, the city installed its first electric streetlights, purchase of the first fire engine and the covering of Beaver Creek.

A Democrat, Warren was his party's nominee for Virginia's 1st Senate district in 1919, losing to Republican John H. Hassinger. He served in the Virginia House of Delegates from 1927 to 1930. He dropped out and was re-elected in 1940. He continued serving until 1947. He then served in the Virginia Senate, representing the 15th district, from 1947 to his death. He was a member of the privileges and elections, courts of justice, roads and internal navigation, and the fish and game committees. Around 1952, along with Emory Widener Sr., he defended 168 United Mine Workers of America charged for mob violence in the Buchanan County circuit court.

== Personal life ==
Warren married Ruba Litton of Lee County. They had one son and two daughters, George Jr., Mrs. Ralph English and Mrs. Hamilton Gemmell. His son was also a state delegate. He was a member of the Central Presbyterian Church.

Warren died on November 15, 1956, at his home on Solar Street in Bristol. He was buried in Emory Cemetery.
