= Thomas Knibbs =

English footballer

Personal information
- Full name: Thomas Henry Knibbs
- Place of birth: Burton upon Trent, England
- Date of death: 21 August 1915
- Place of death: Gallipoli, Turkey
- Position: Outside left

Senior career*
Years	Team	Apps	(Gls)
1898–1899	Burton Swifts	29	(5)
1904	Preston North End	0	(0)
- * Club domestic league appearances and goals

Thomas Henry Knibbs (died 21 August 1915) was an English amateur footballer who played in the Football League for Burton Swifts as an outside left.

== Personal life ==
Knibbs worked as an engine fitter and served as a private in the York and Lancaster Regiment during the First World War. He was killed during the Gallipoli Campaign on 21 August 1915 and is commemorated on the Helles Memorial.
