= George Warren (footballer) =

English footballer

Personal information
- Full name: George Warren
- Date of birth: 1880
- Place of birth: Burton upon Trent, England
- Date of death: 16 May 1917 (aged 36–37)
- Place of death: Loos-en-Gohelle, France
- Position: Forward

Senior career*
Years	Team	Apps	(Gls)
1897–1898	Rangermoor Albion		
1898–1899	Burton Swifts	2	(0)
1899–1900	Sheppey United		
1900–1903	Hinckley Town		
1903–1904	Leicester Fosse	21	(7)
1904–1905	Gresley Rovers	27	(11)
1905–1906	Hinckley United		
1906–1907	Nuneaton Town		(22)
1907–1911	Coventry City	73	(31)
1911	Willenhall Swifts		
1911	Stockport County	3	(0)
1911–1912	Dudley		
1912–1913	Nuneaton Town		(12)
- Hinckley United
- * Club domestic league appearances and goals

George Warren (1880 – 16 May 1917) was an English professional footballer who played in the Football League for Leicester Fosse, Burton Swifts and Stockport County as a forward. He also played in the Southern League for Coventry City and was nicknamed "Tubby". He was described as "a great centre-forward" who possessed "an invaluable capacity for keeping opposing defences guessing".

== Personal life ==
As of 1901, Warren was working as a plumber in Hinckley. He married in 1903 and had two children before his wife died in 1915. At the outbreak of the First World War in 1914, Warren was the licensed victualler of the Three Tuns Inn, Hinckley. In December 1915, 18 months after the outbreak of the war, he enlisted in the Army Reserve and remarried in 1916 and had another child. In April 1917, Warren was posted to the Western Front as a private in the Army Service Corps and was killed just one month later in the Loos Salient, while serving with the York and Lancaster Regiment. He was buried in Philosophe British Cemetery, Mazingarbe.

== Career statistics ==
Appearances and goals by club, season and competition
Club	Season	League			FA Cup		Total	
Club	Season	Division	Apps	Goals	Apps	Goals	Apps	Goals
Leicester Fosse	1903–04	Second Division	21	7	0	0	21	7
Coventry City	1907–08	Southern League First Division	6	6	0	0	6	6
Coventry City	1908–09	Southern League First Division	31	15	2	1	33	16
Coventry City	1909–10	Southern League First Division	17	9	5	2	22	11
Coventry City	1910–11	Southern League First Division	25	7	0	0	25	7
Coventry City	Total		73	31	7	3	80	34
Stockport County	1911–12	Second Division	3	0	0	0	3	0
Career total			97	38	7	3	104	41

== Honours ==
Nuneaton Town

- Atherstone Nursing Cup: 1912–13
