= Craig McAughtrie =

English footballer (born 1981)

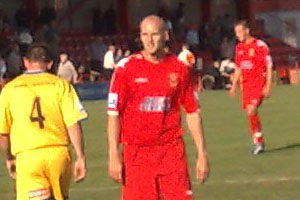

Personal information
- Full name: Craig James McAughtrie
- Date of birth: 3 March 1981 (age 45)
- Place of birth: Burton upon Trent, England
- Height: 6 ft 2 in (1.88 m)
- Position: Defender

Youth career
- 1997–2000: Sheffield United

Senior career*
Years	Team	Apps	(Gls)
2000–2002	Carlisle United	10	(1)
2002–2007	Stafford Rangers	176	(16)
2007–2009	Tamworth	68	(3)
2009	King's Lynn	4	(0)
2009–2010	Eastwood Town	7	(1)
2010	→ Stafford Rangers (loan)	15	(1)
2010–2011	Stafford Rangers		
2011–2012	Hinckley United	4	(0)
2011–2012	→ Mickleover Sports (loan)		
- * Club domestic league appearances and goals

Craig James McAughtrie (born 3 March 1981) is an English former footballer who played as a defender for Sheffield United, Carlisle United, Stafford Rangers, Tamworth, King's Lynn, Eastwood Town, Hinckley United and Mickleover Sports.

== Career ==
=== Sheffield United ===
Born in Burton upon Trent, Staffordshire, McAughtrie began his professional career as a trainee with Sheffield United; he joined the club on 1 August 1997, but failed to force his way into the first team. He spent three seasons on the books at United. However, McAughtrie left at the end of the 1999–2000 season, without making a first team appearance.

=== Carlisle United ===
On 5 August 2000, McAughtrie joined Carlisle United. He was not a regular with Carlisle, and during a two-year stint he made 10 appearances and scored once. His only goal for Carlisle was a 90th-minute winner in a 3–2 home win against Macclesfield Town on 1 April 2002 in a Third Division match. McAughtrie was released Carlisle at the end of the 2001–02 season.

=== Stafford Rangers ===
In the summer of 2002, McAughtrie made a move to Stafford Rangers of the Southern Football League Premier Division. He made his debut on 17 August and during the season formed a great partnership at the heart of the Stafford defence with captain Wayne Daniel.

McAughtrie marked his 200th appearance for the club on 24 March 2007 with a goal against Grays Athletic in a 4–2 home win. Since the arrival of former Northampton Town defender Fred Murray on 28 August, McAughtrie found first team chances hard to come by.

=== Tamworth ===
On 13 September 2007, McAughtrie signed for Conference North side Tamworth for an undisclosed fee. On 18 May 2009, McAughtrie was released by Tamworth, along with teammates Dean Lea and Callum Burgess.

=== Later career ===
After leaving Tamworth, McAughtrie had a spell at King's Lynn and Eastwood Town before returning to Stafford Rangers in 2010.

=== Hinckley United ===
After Stafford were relegated, McAughtrie signed for Hinckley United in June 2011. But after failing to establish himself at the club he was loaned out to lower league Mickleover Sports for the remainder of the season.

== Personal life ==
McAughtrie is a policeman, and it was suggested that he would struggle with the extra commitments and travelling following the club's promotion to the Conference National.

== Honours ==
Stafford Rangers

- Conference North play-offs: 2005–06

Tamworth

- Conference North: 2008–09
